= Littoral Region (Cameroon) =

Region of Cameroon

Littoral Region Région du Littoral
- Region
- Location of Littoral Region within Cameroon
- Coordinates: 4°00′N 10°00′E
- Country: Cameroon
- Capital: Douala
- Departments: Moungo, Nkam, Sanaga-Maritime, Wouri

Government
  - Governor: Samuel Ivaha Diboua (2015– )

Area
  - Total: 36,452 km^{2} (14,074 sq mi)

Population (2015)
  - Total: 3,354,978
  - Density: 92.038/km^{2} (238.38/sq mi)
- ISO 3166 code: CM-LT
- HDI (2022): 0.706 high · 1st of 10

The Littoral Region (French: Région du Littoral) is a region of Cameroon. Its capital is Douala. As of 2004, its population was 3,174,437. Its name is due to the region being largely littoral, and associated with the sea coast.

The Douala Edéa Wildlife Reserve is in the region.

== Demographics ==
Historical population
Year	Pop.	±% p.a.
1976	935,166	—
1987	1,352,833	+3.41%
2005	2,510,263	+3.49%
2015	3,354,978	+2.94%

== Divisions ==
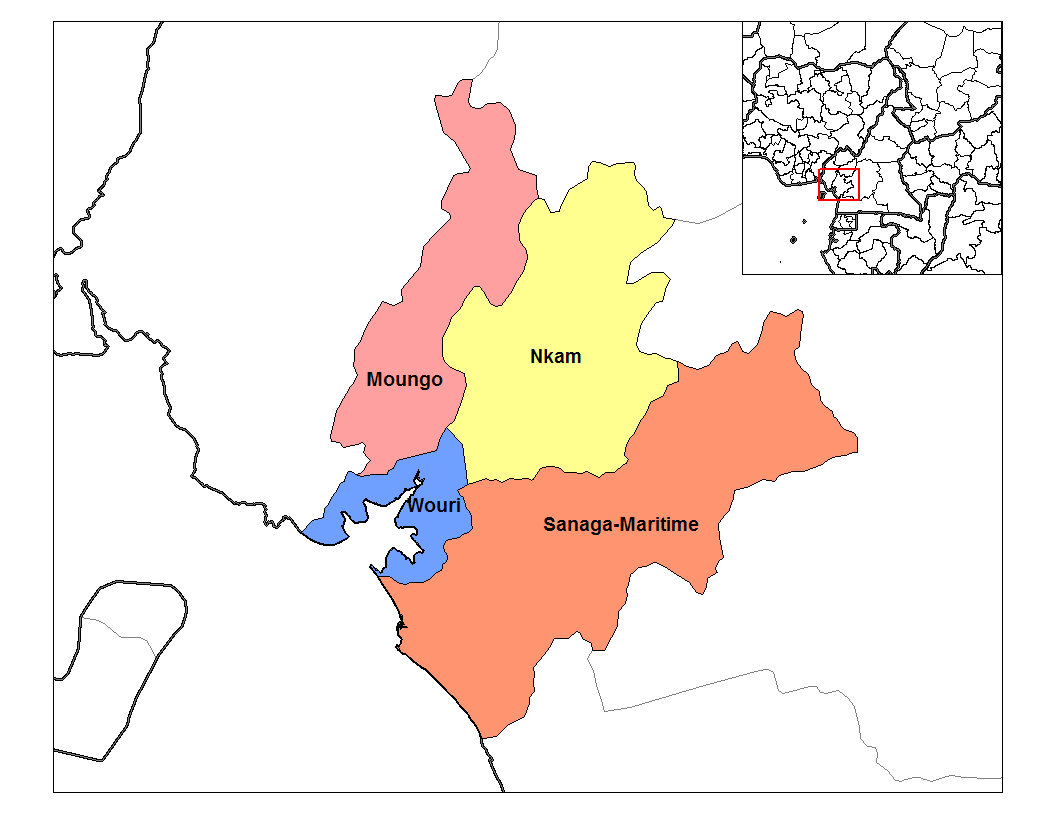
Departments of Littoral

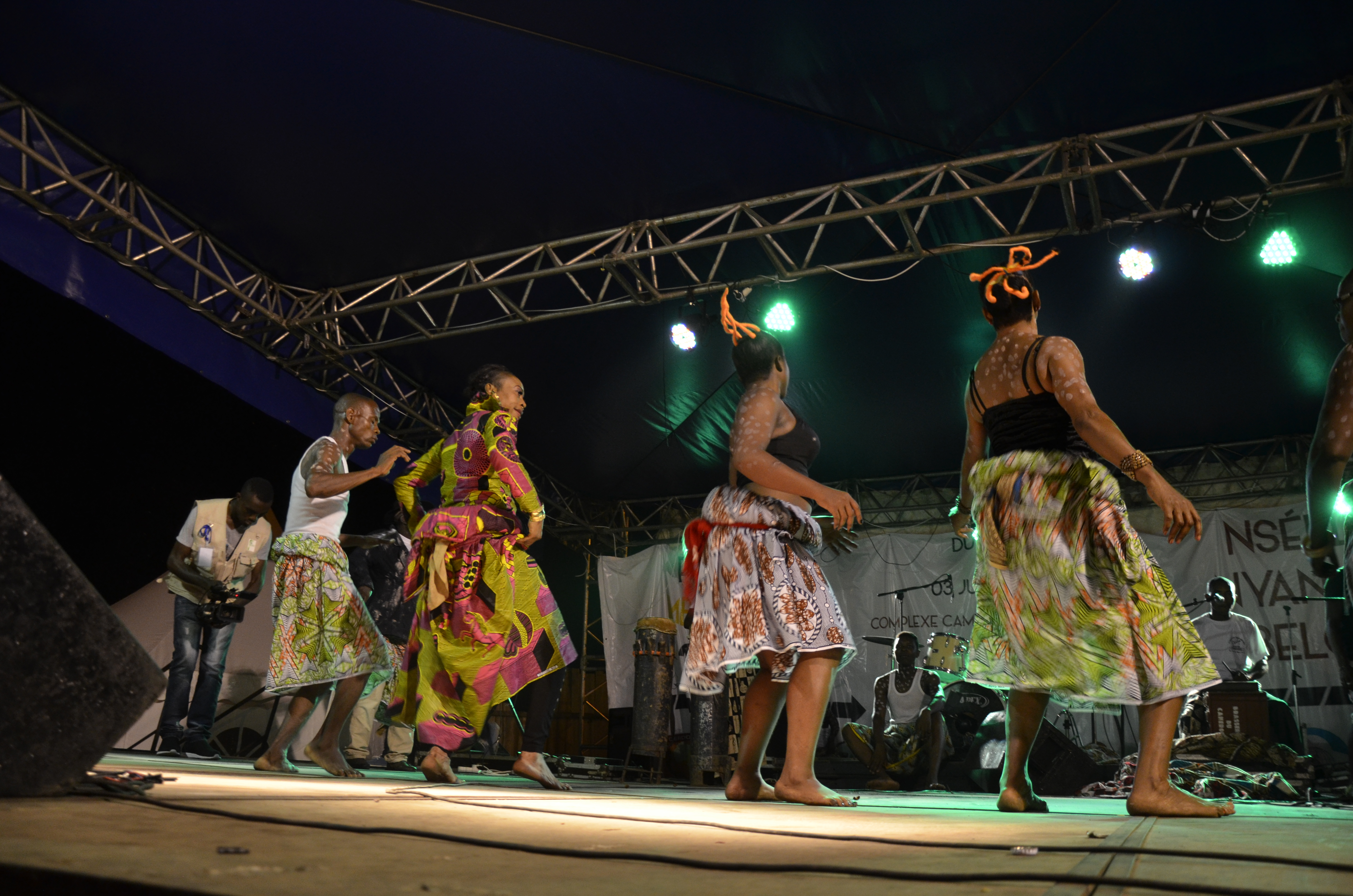
Assiko at Festival Mbog Liaa

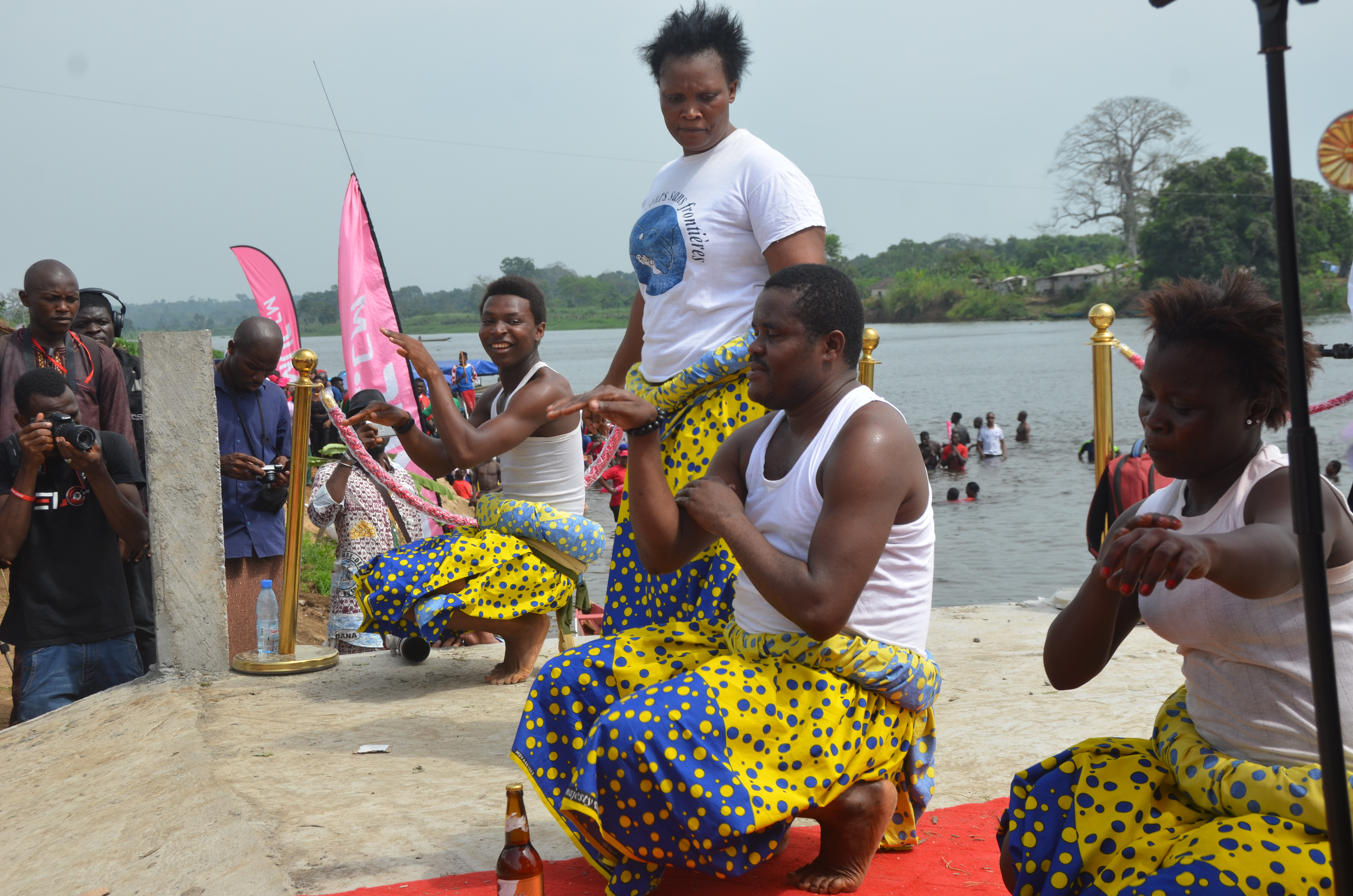
Assiko at du Ngondo

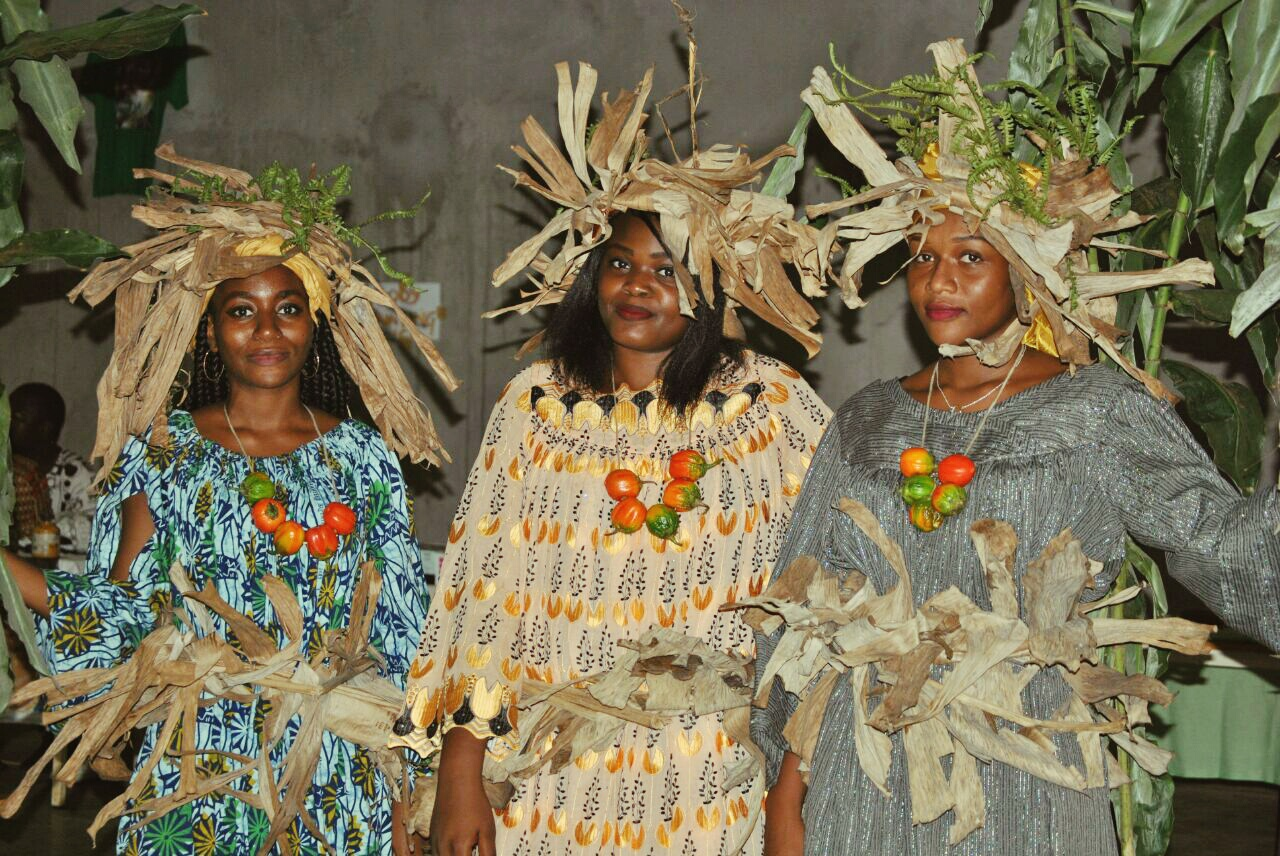
Sawa Princess

The region is divided into four departments (départements):

1. Nkam, with its capital at Yabassi.
2. Moungo, with its capital at Nkongsamba.
3. Sanaga-Maritime, with its capital at Édéa.
4. Wouri, forming the area around the major city of Douala.

These are in turn broken down into subdivisions. Presidentially appointed senior divisional officers (préfets) and subdivisional officers (sous-préfets) govern each. Traditional leaders, usually referred to as chiefs in English, often preside over particular ethnic groups or villages; nevertheless, many of these wield very little power today.

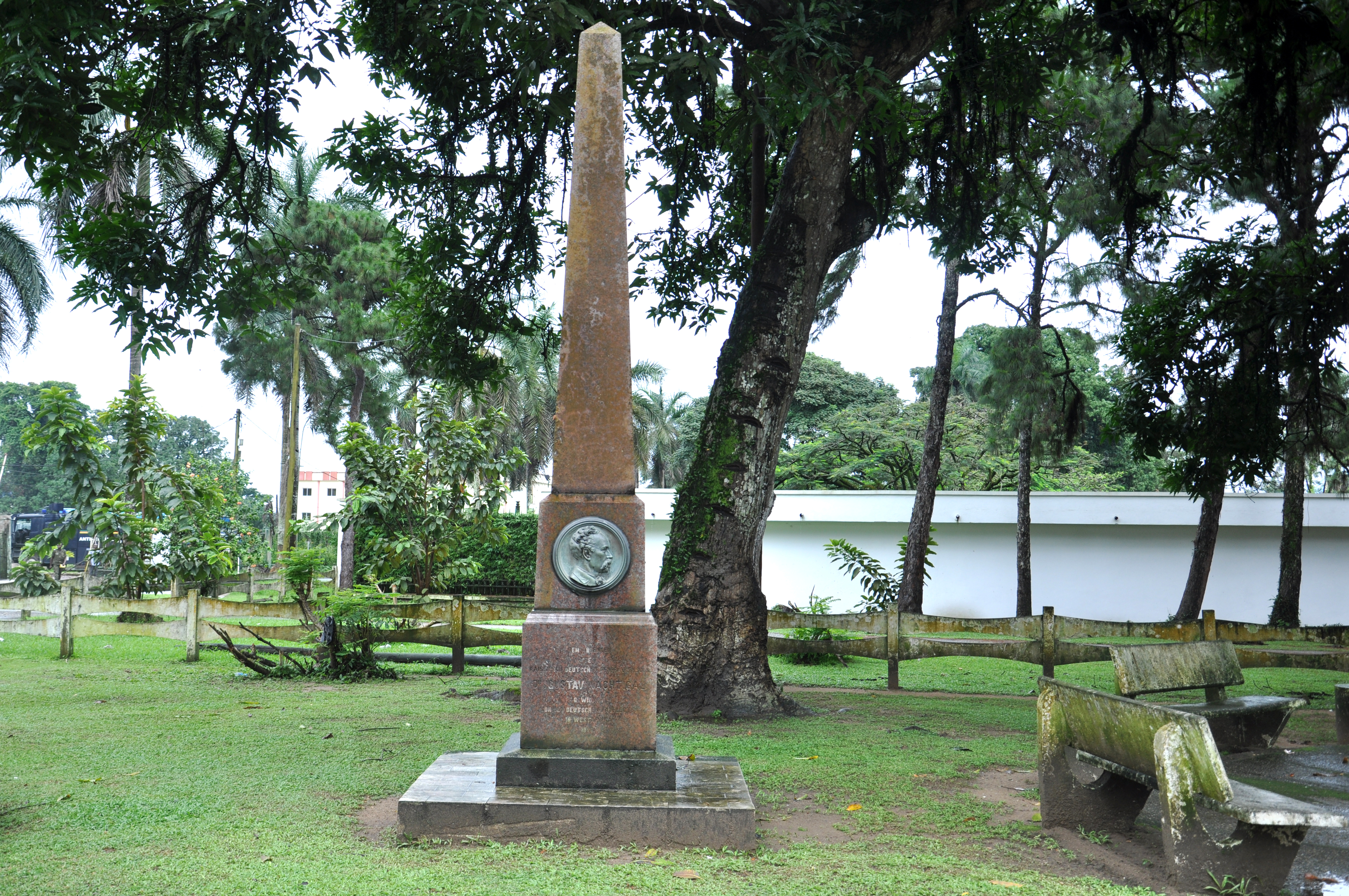
Memorial of GUSTAV NACHTIGAL

== Culture ==
=== Traditional Dance ===
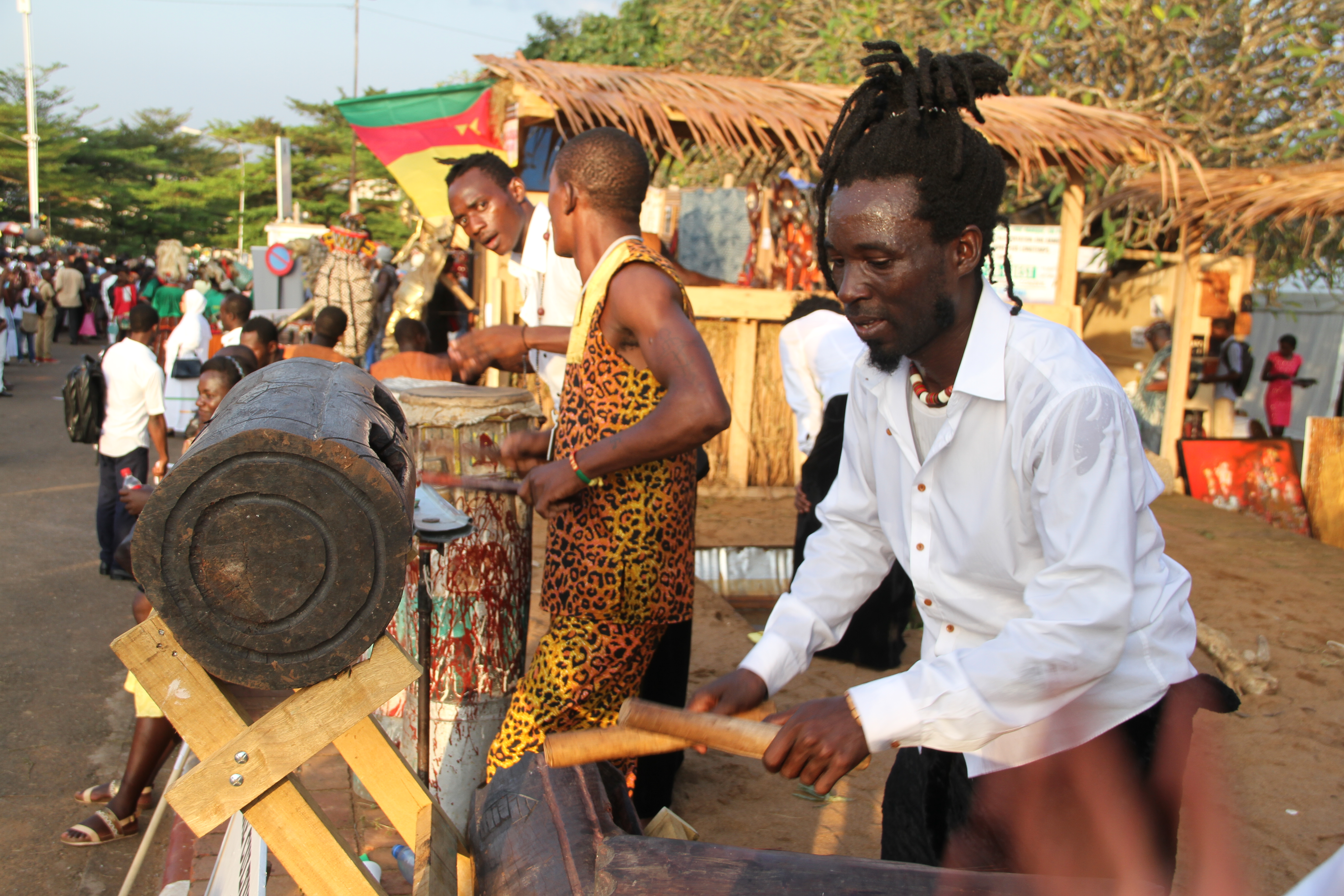

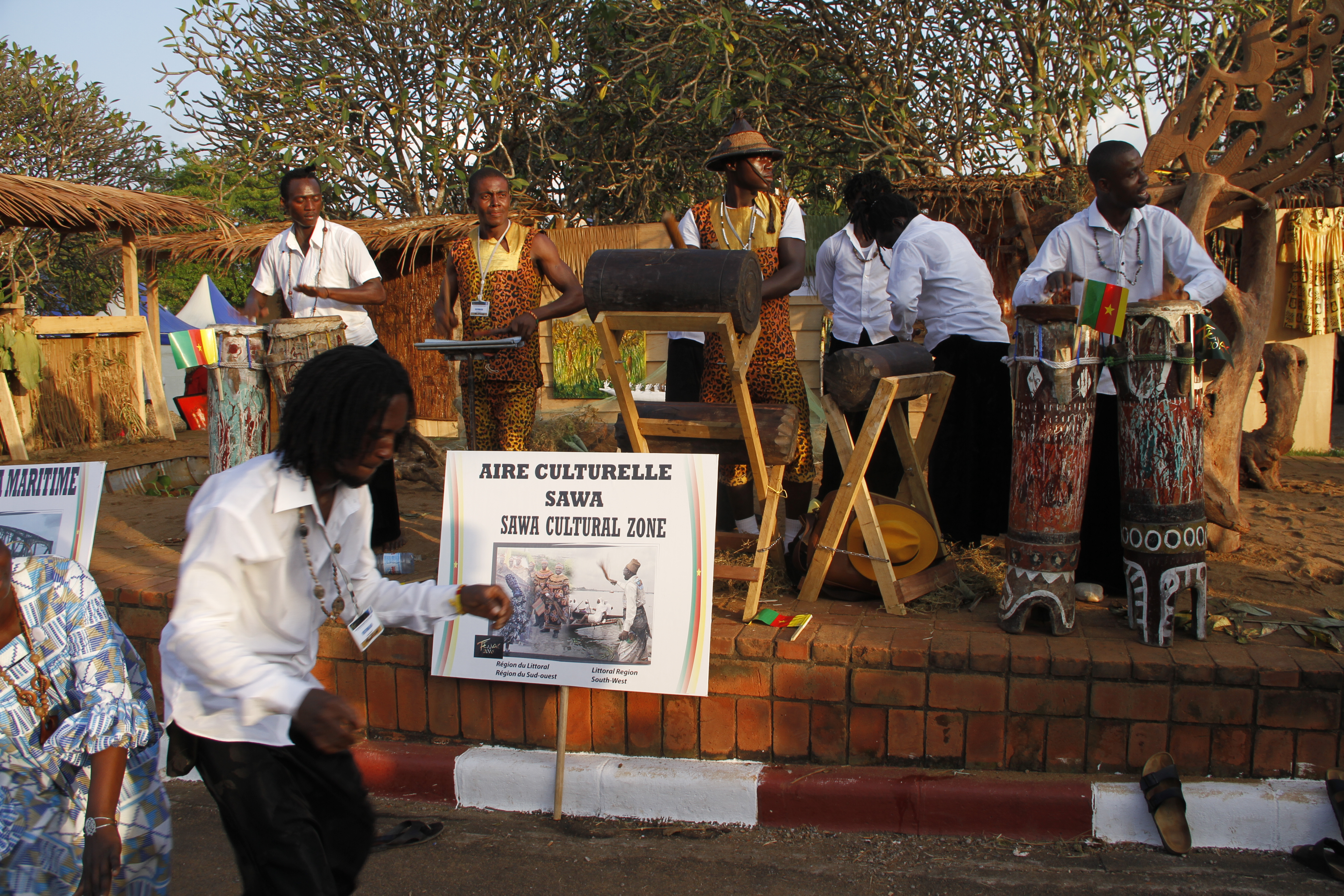

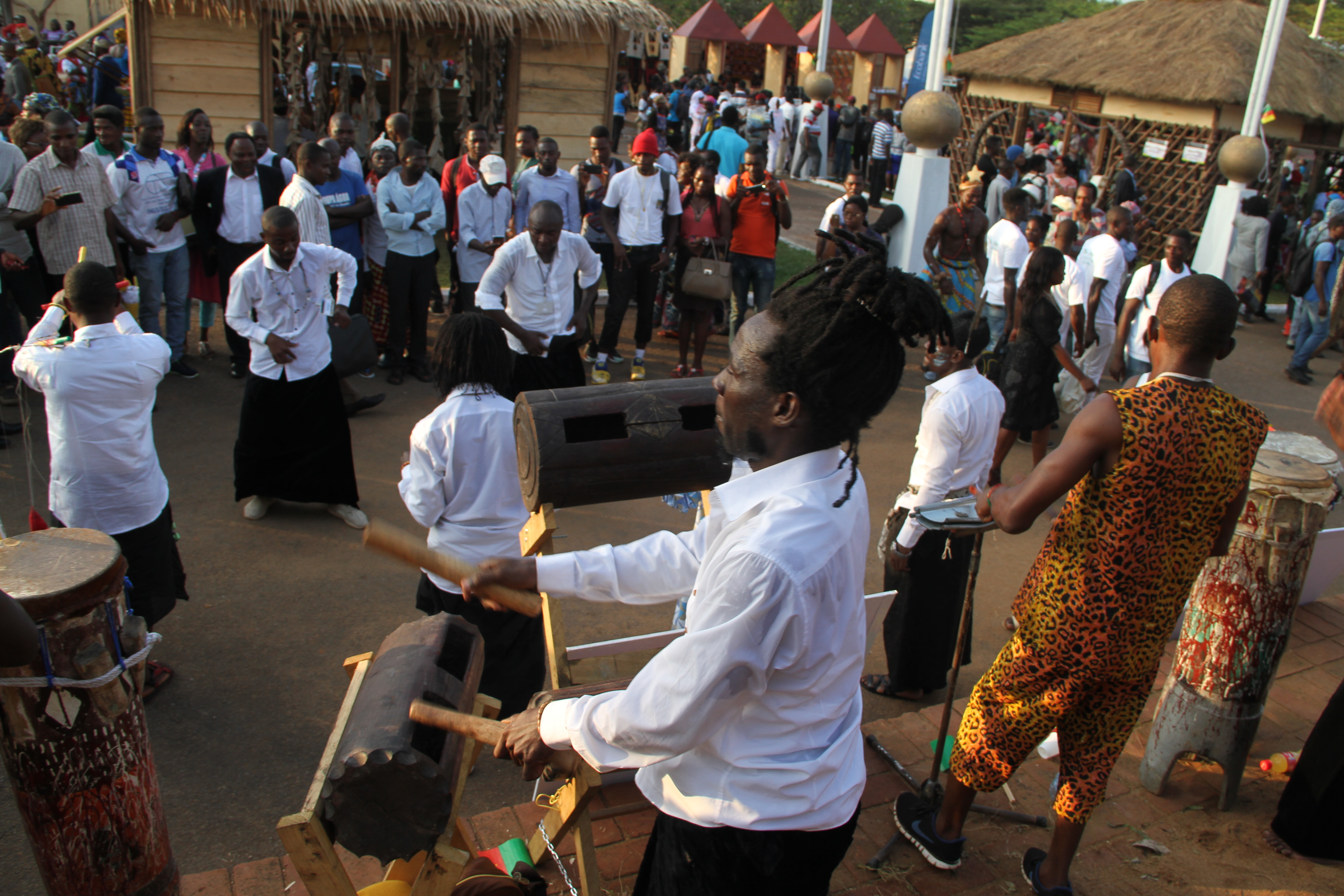

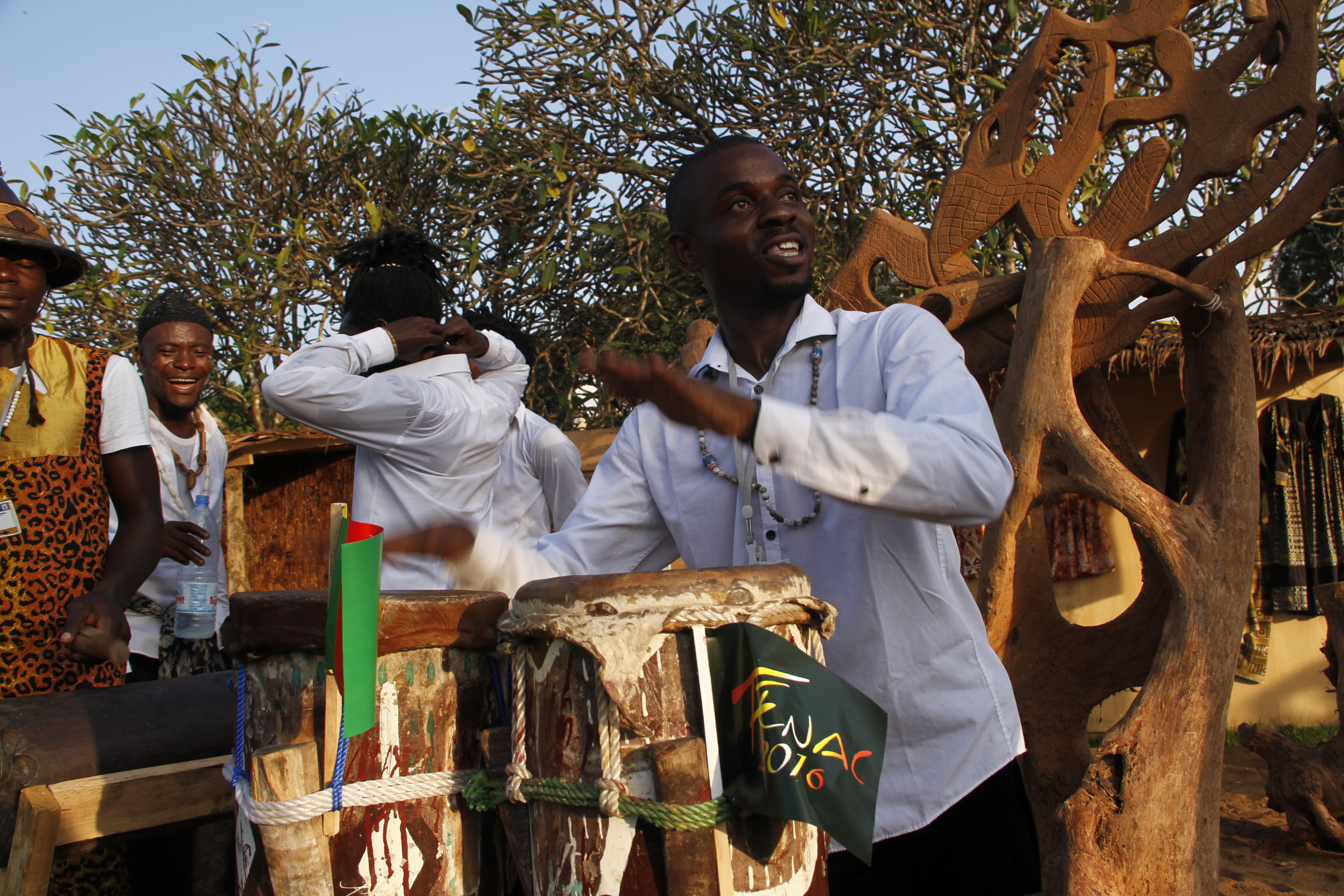

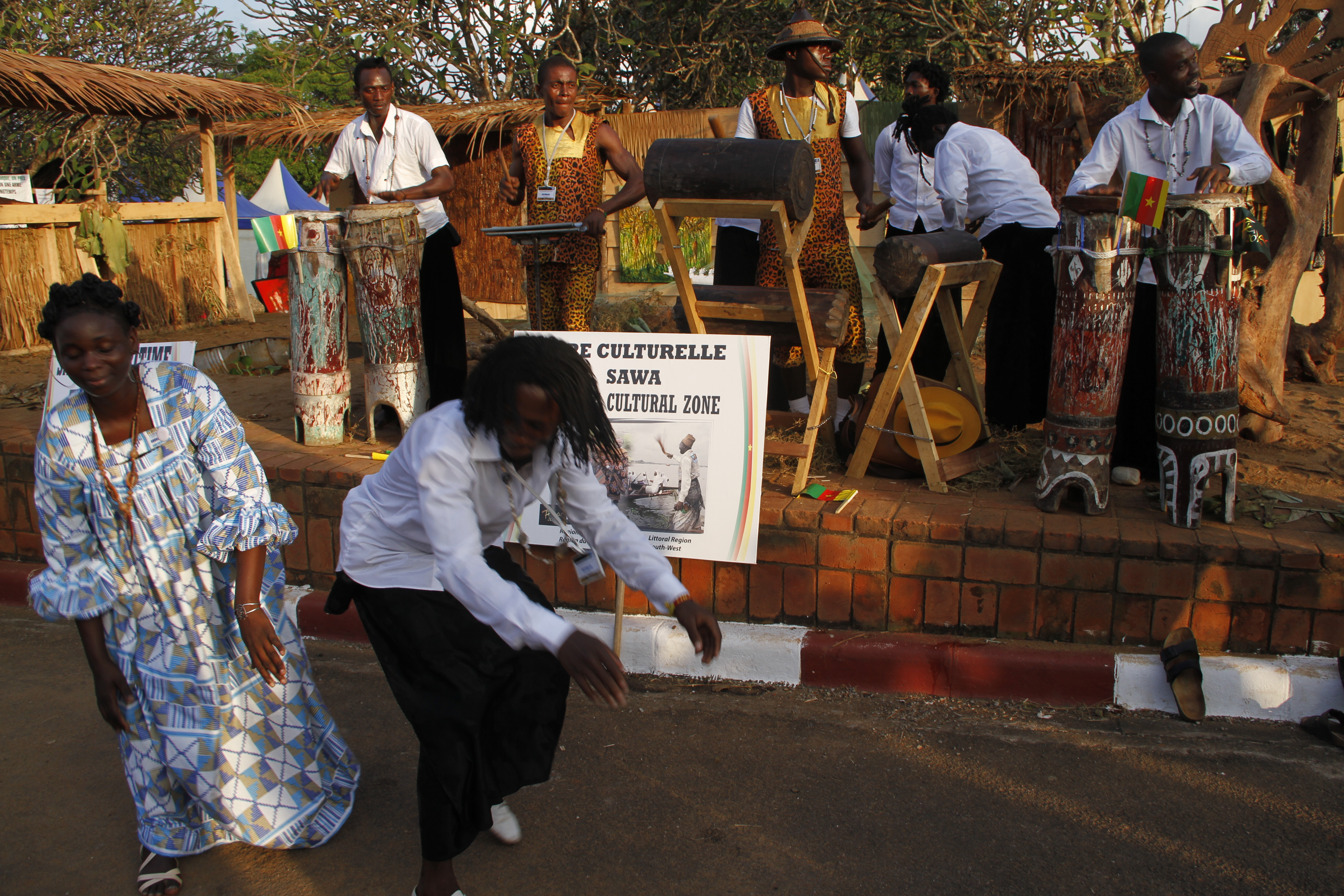

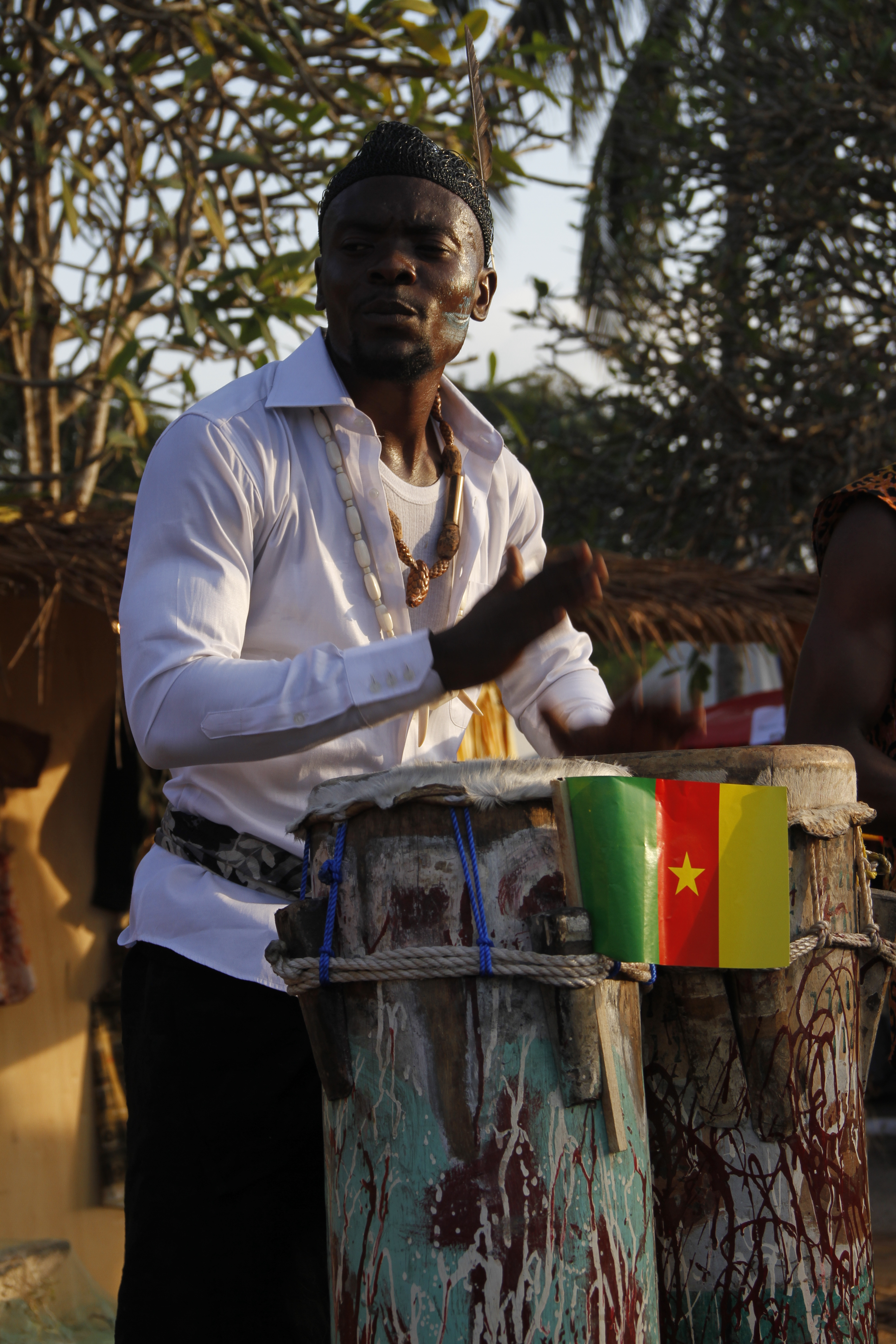

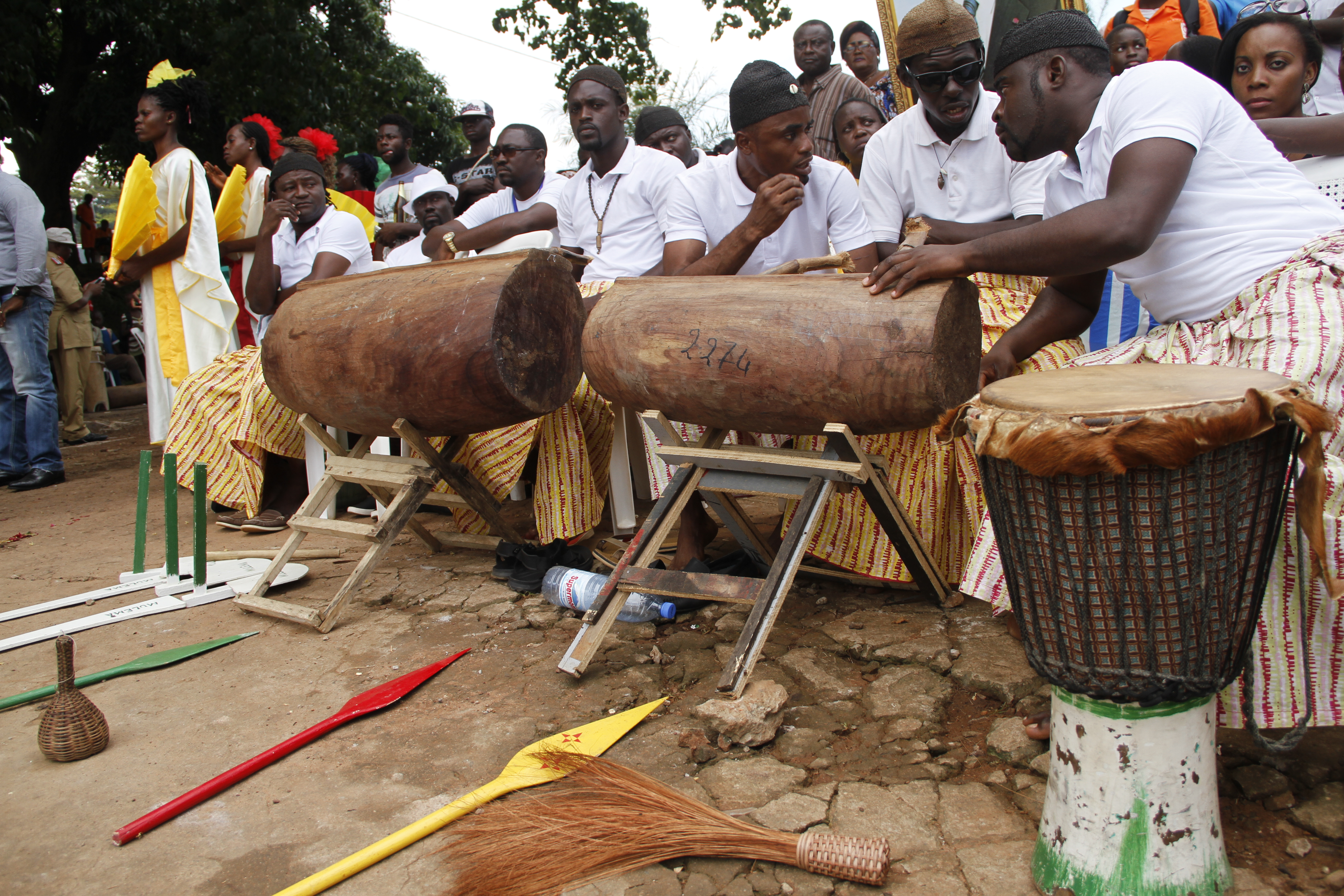

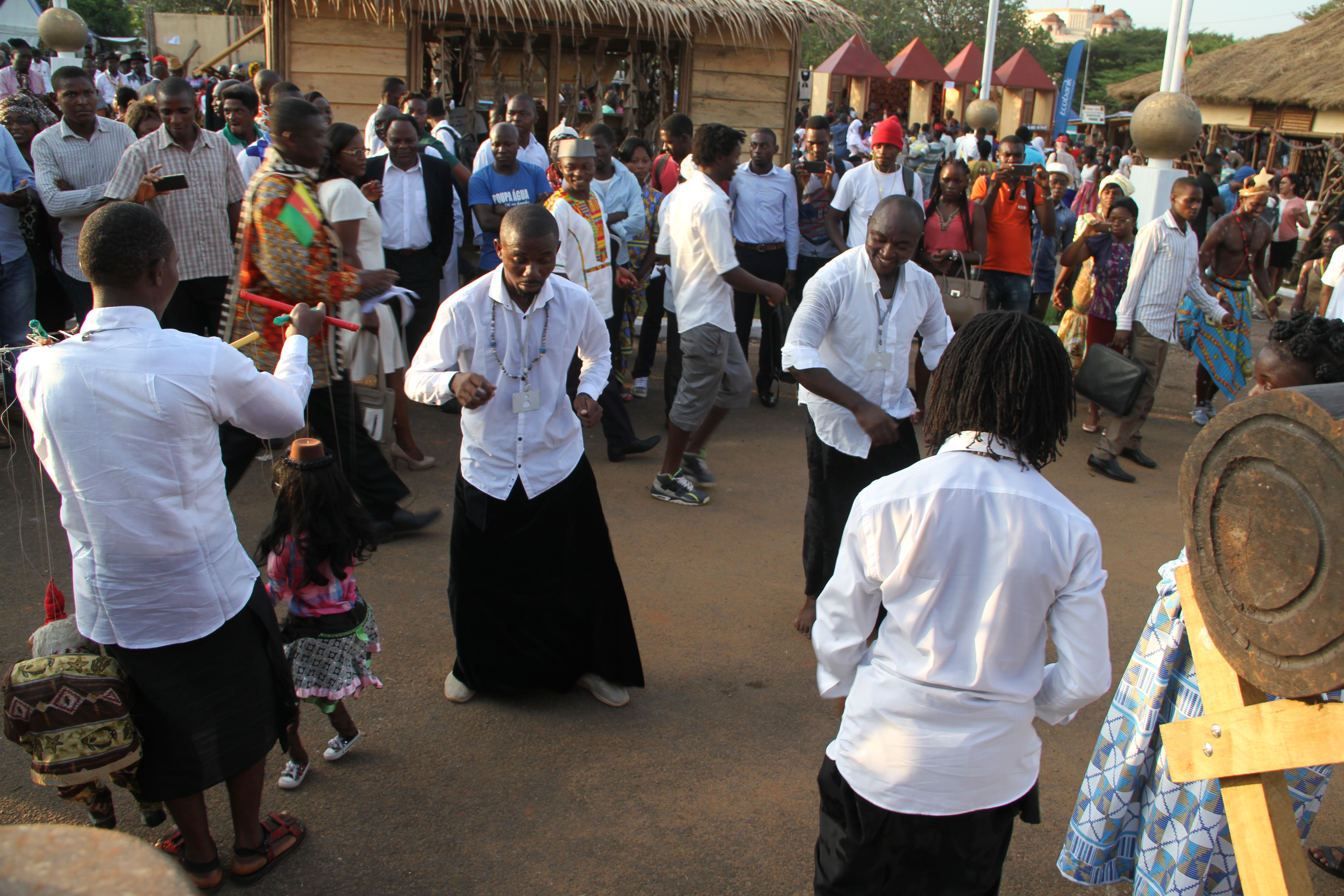

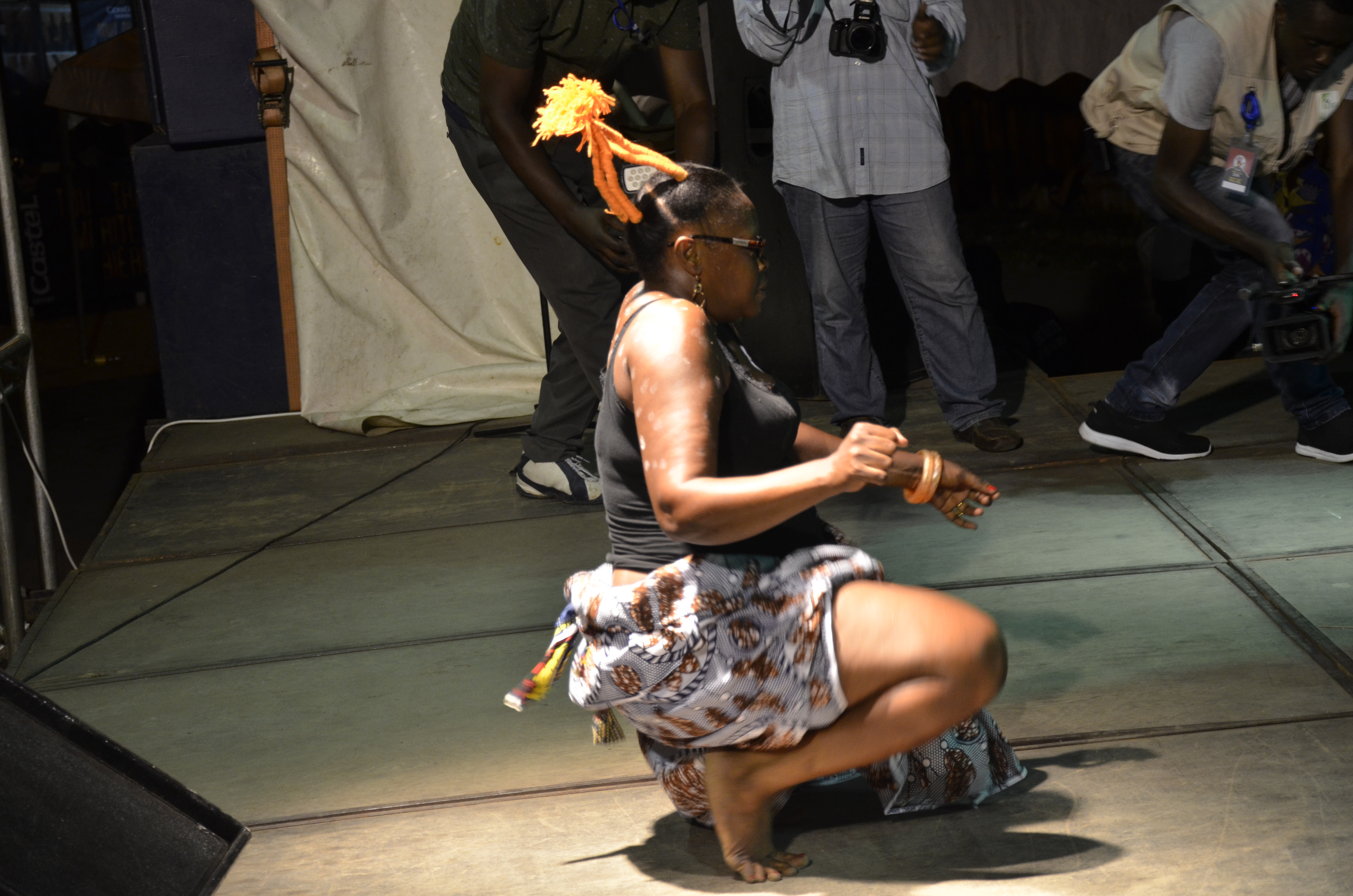

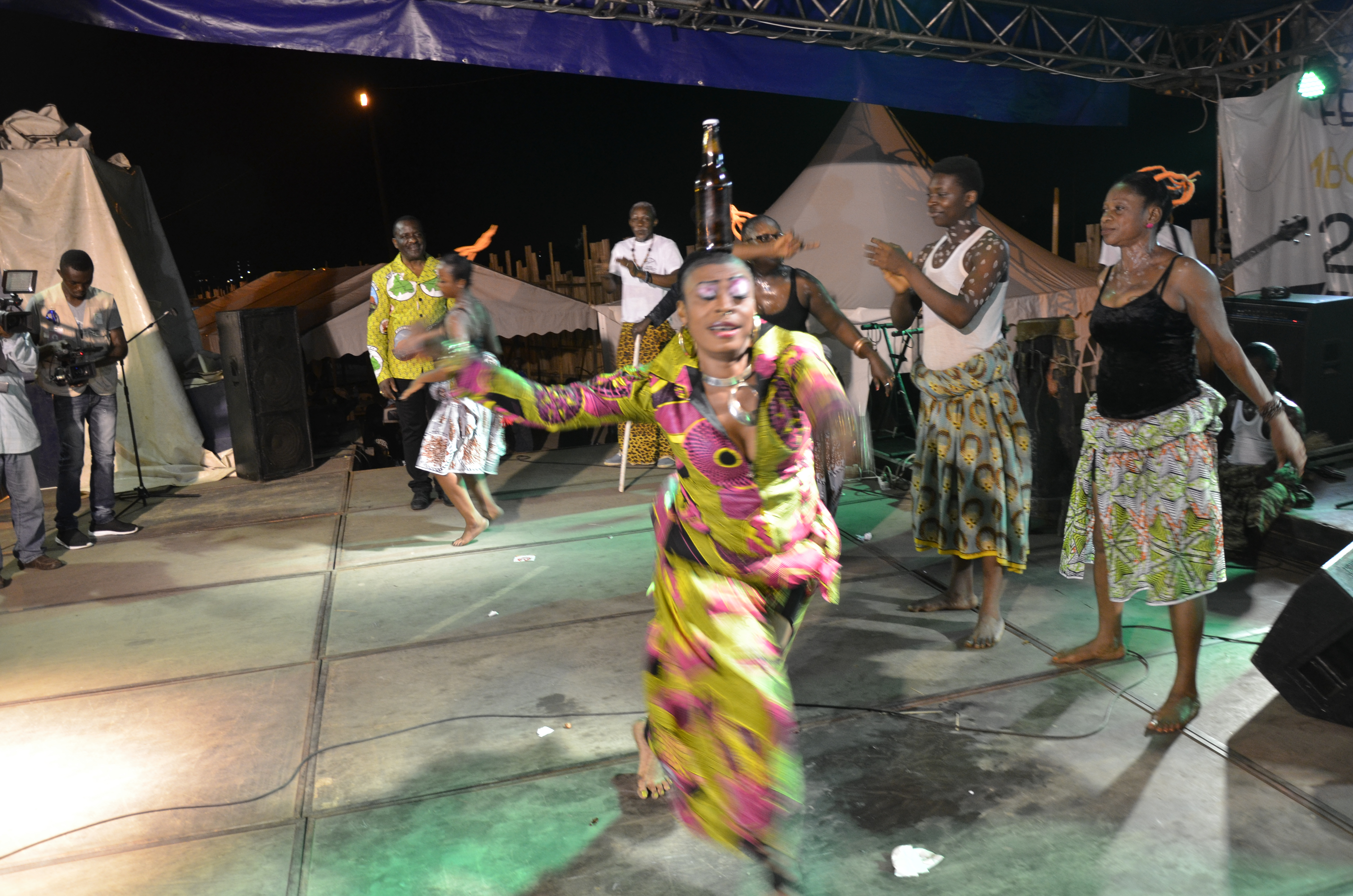

=== Traditional musical instruments ===
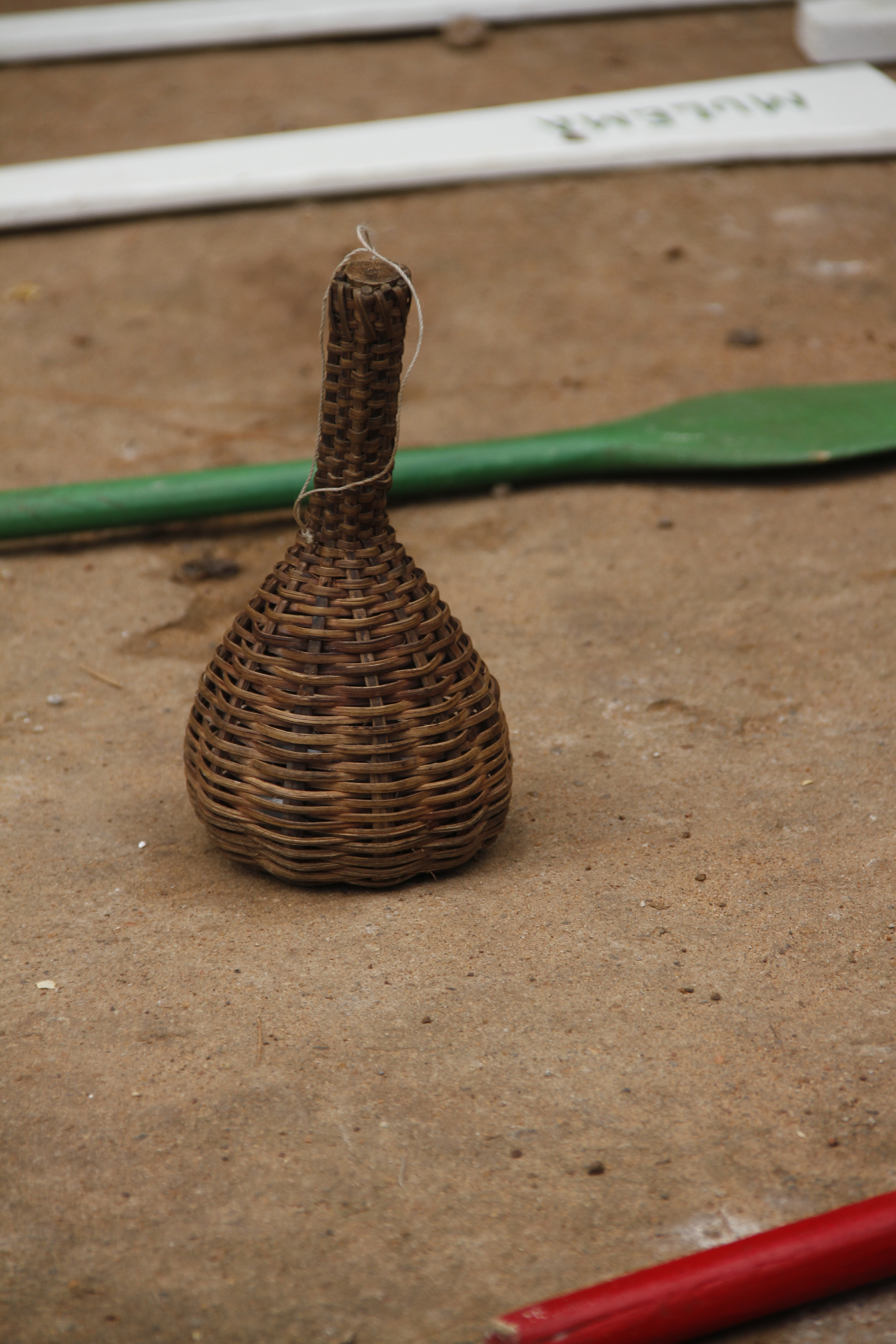

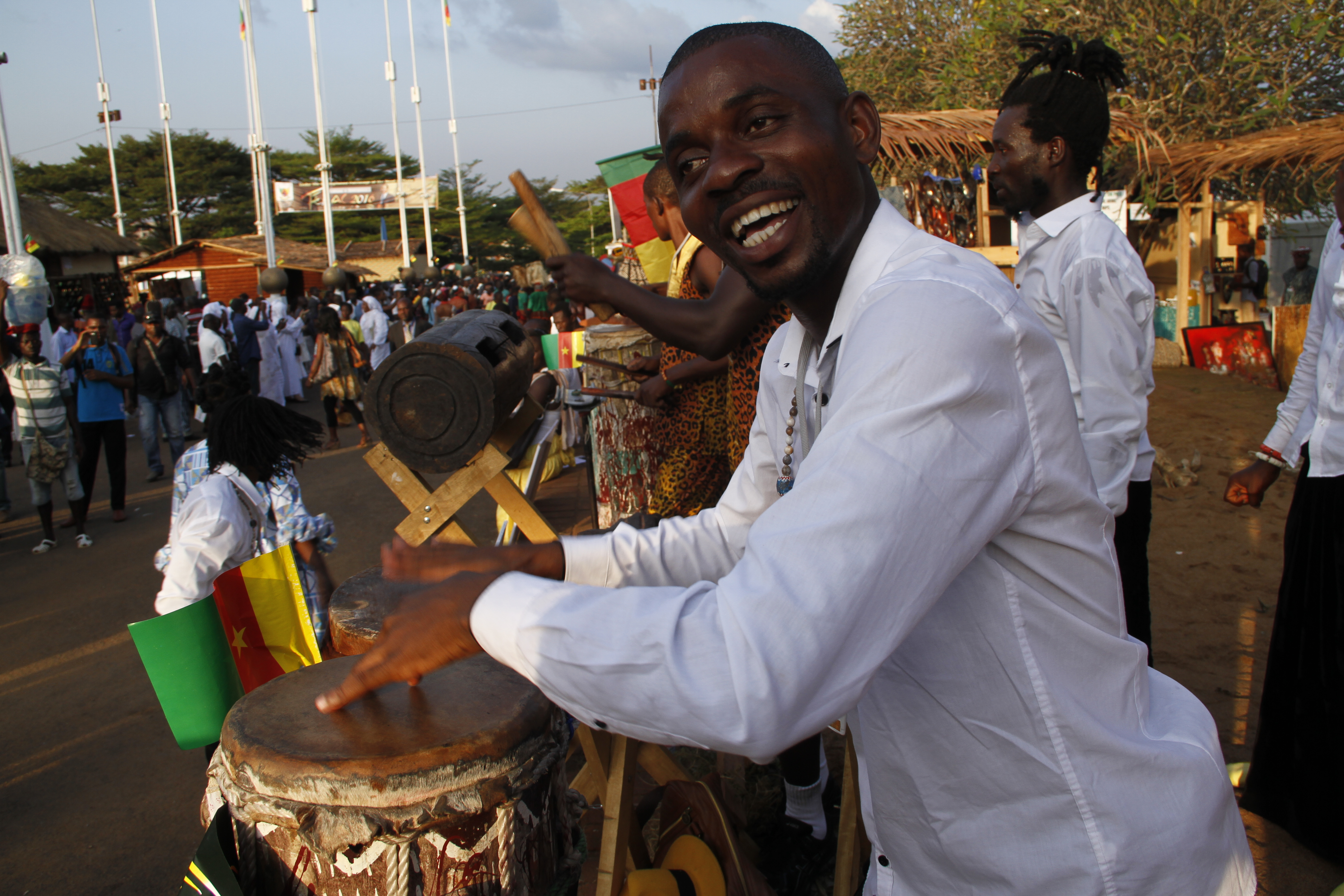

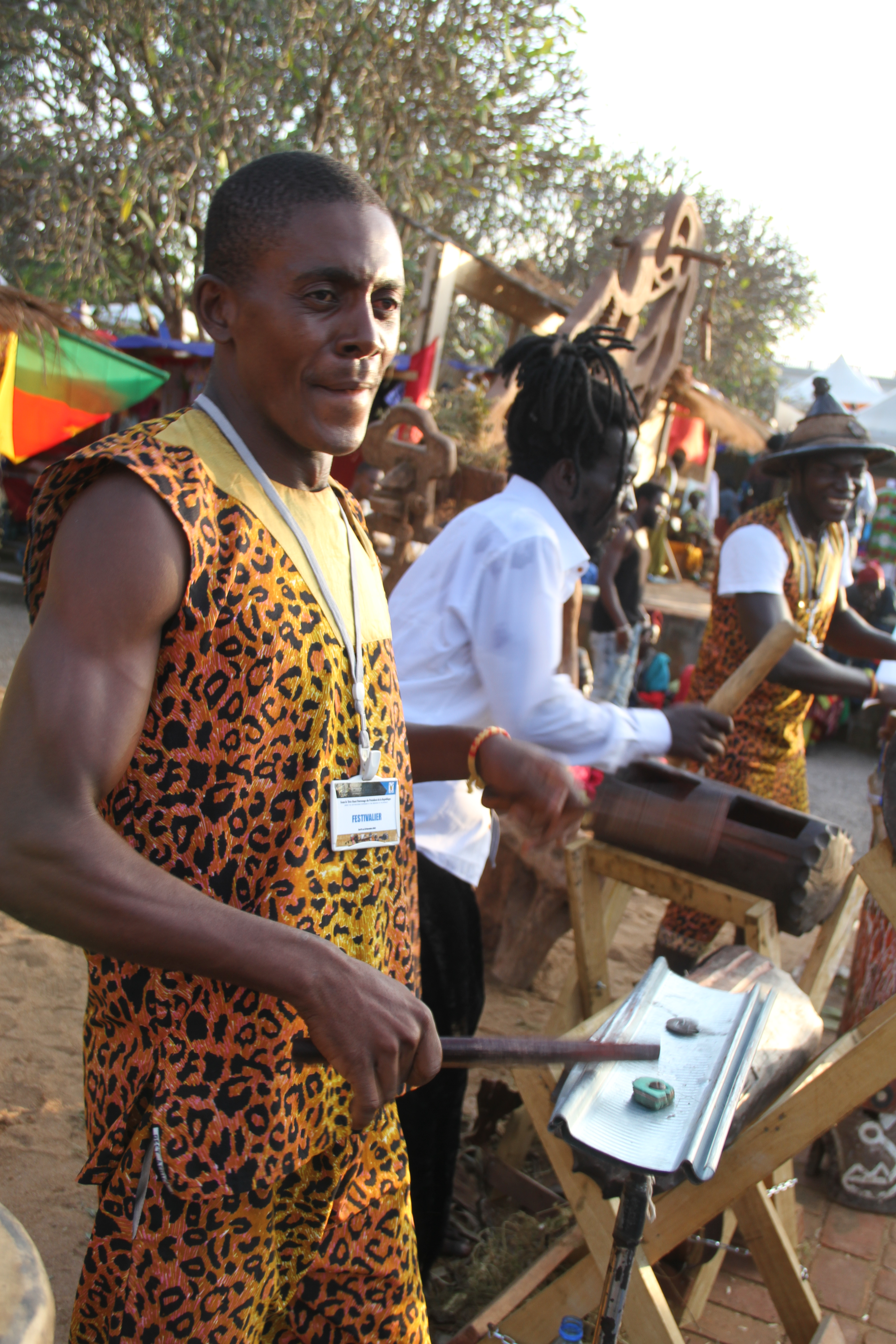

=== Traditional dance accessories ===
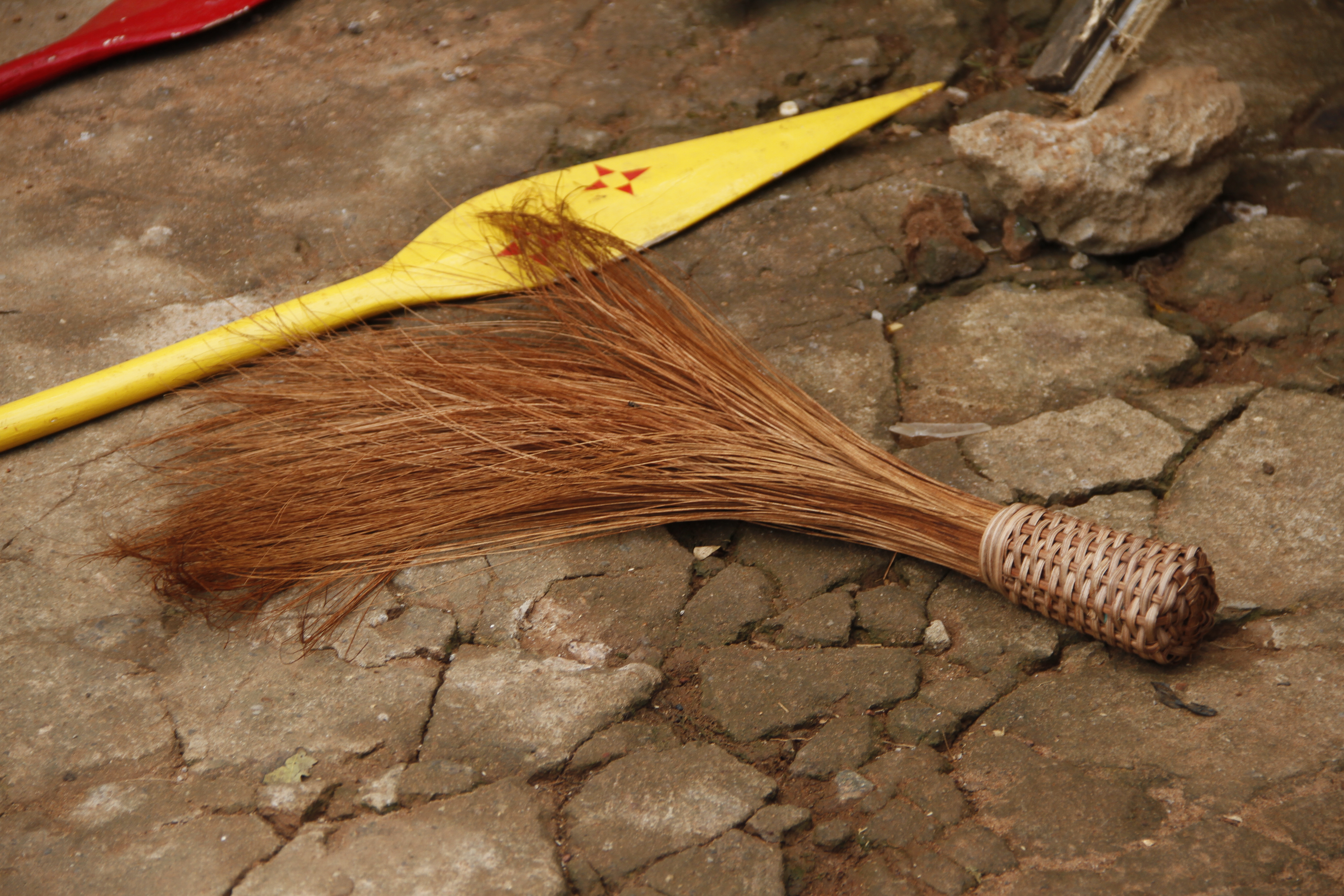

=== Traditional clothes ===
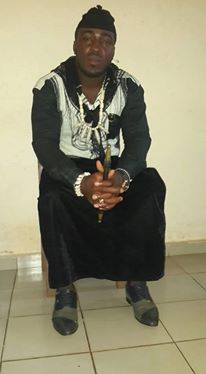
Sanja wear by King Kum Prosper III

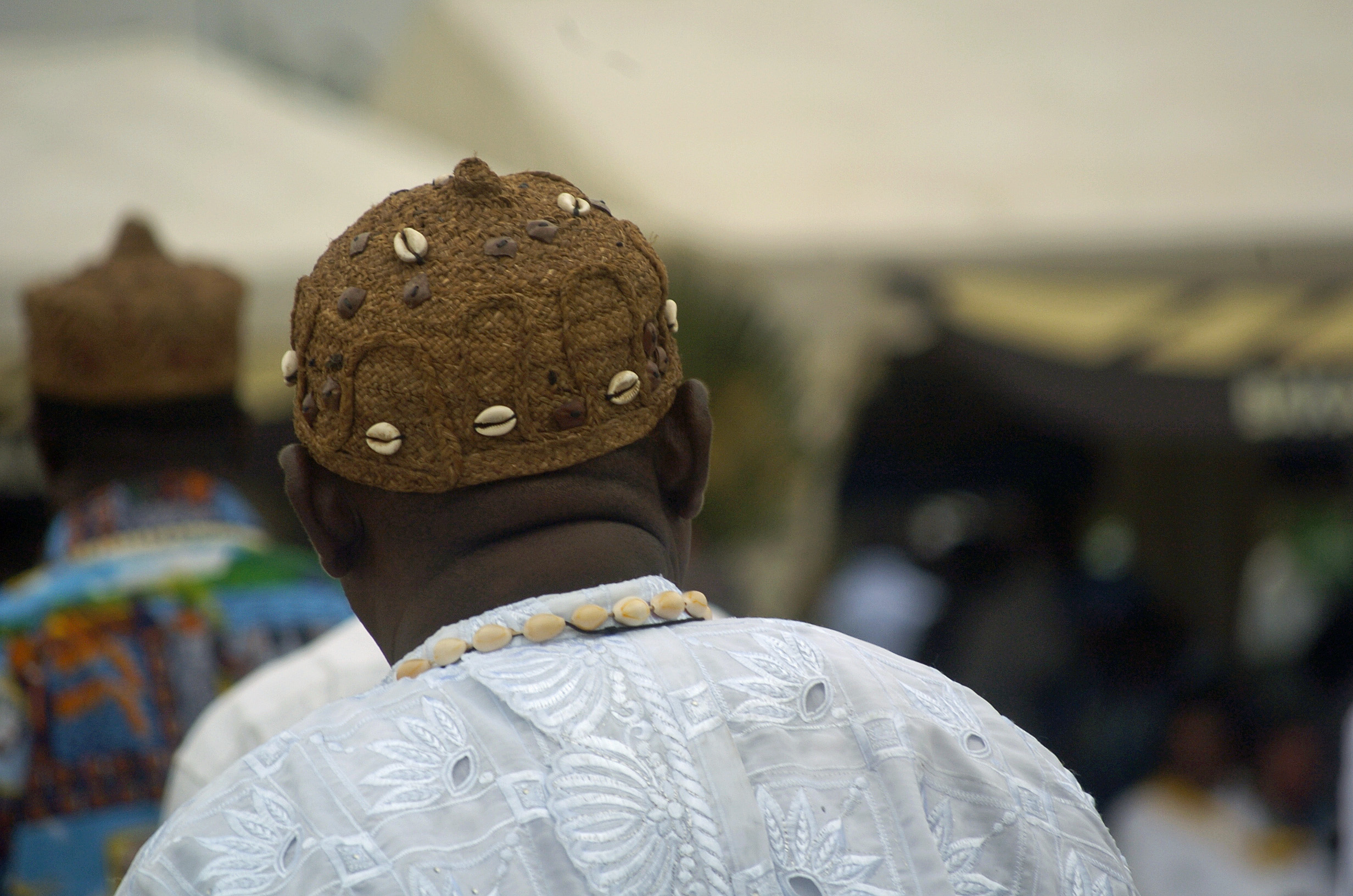
Traditional hat

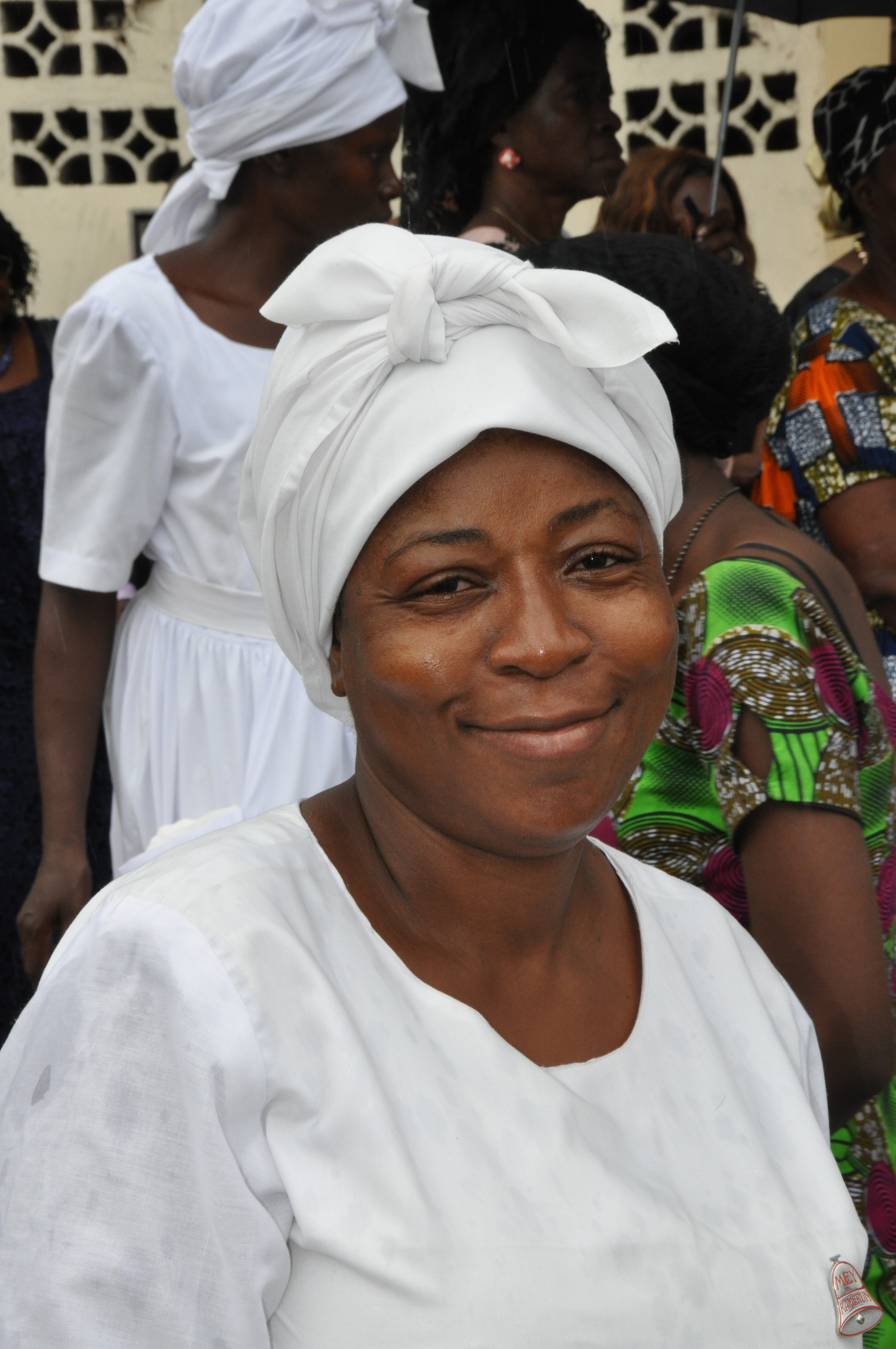
Kaba Ngondo scarf

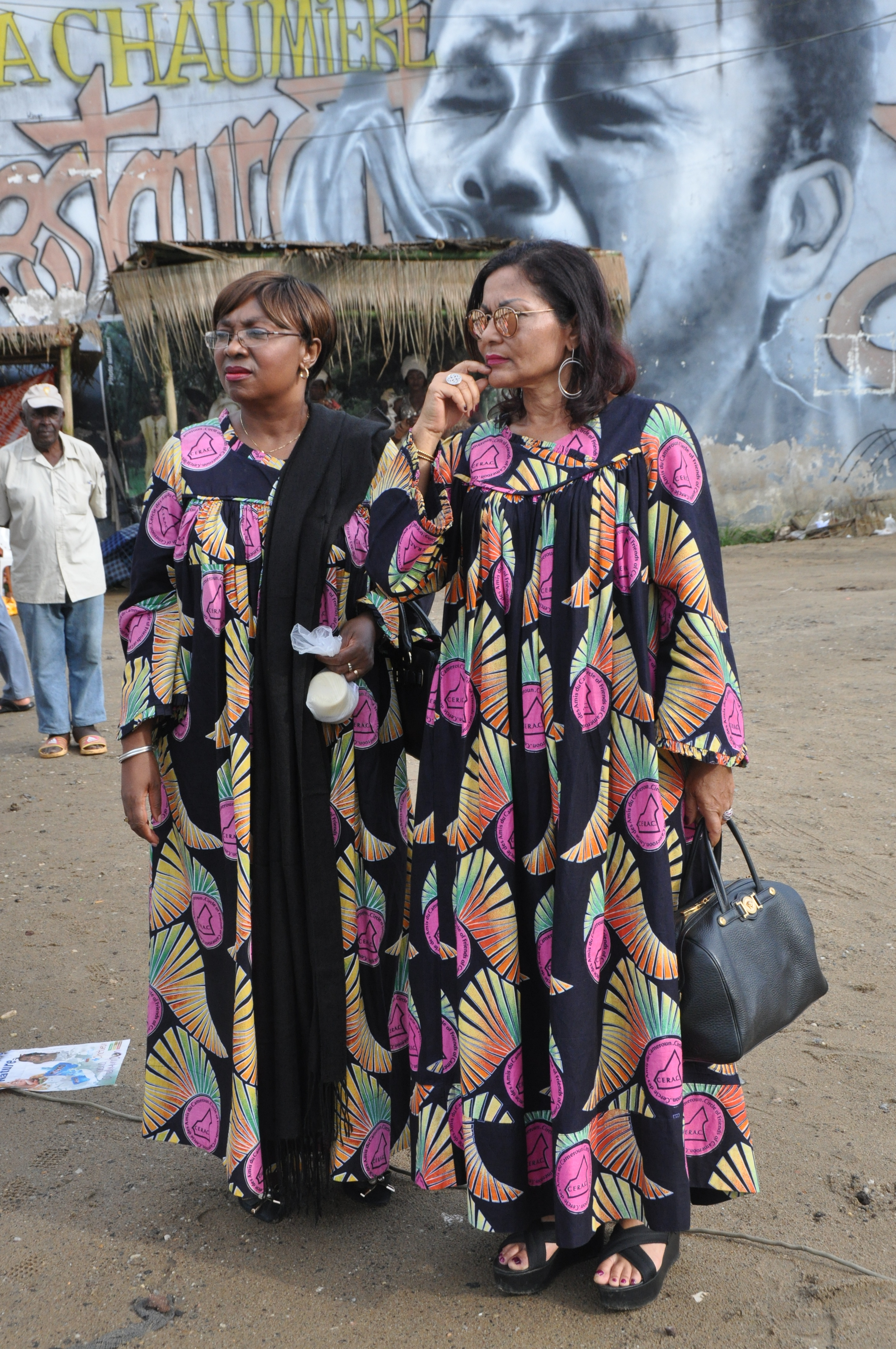
Women with Kaba Ngondo

Hair style and head covers

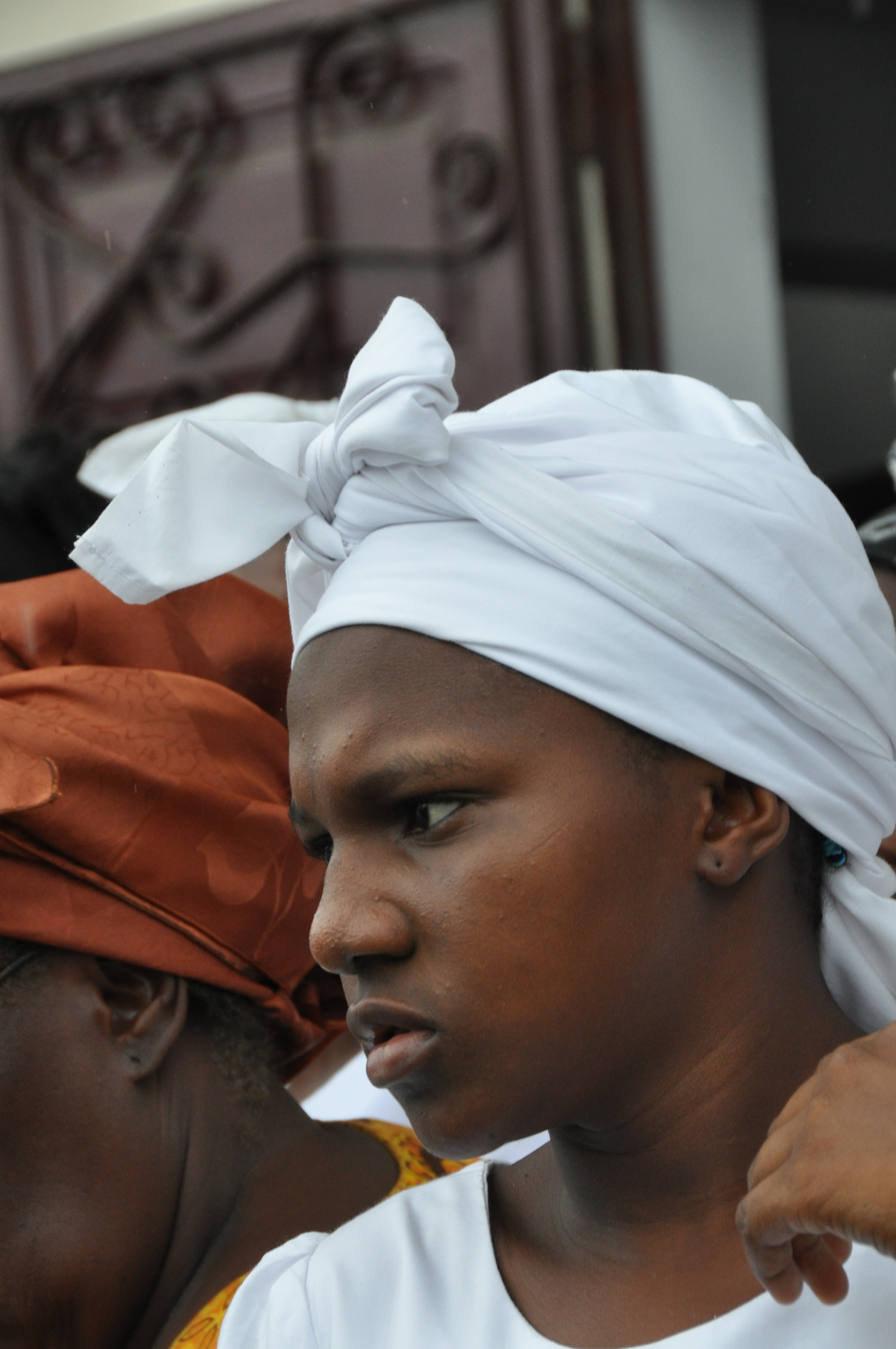

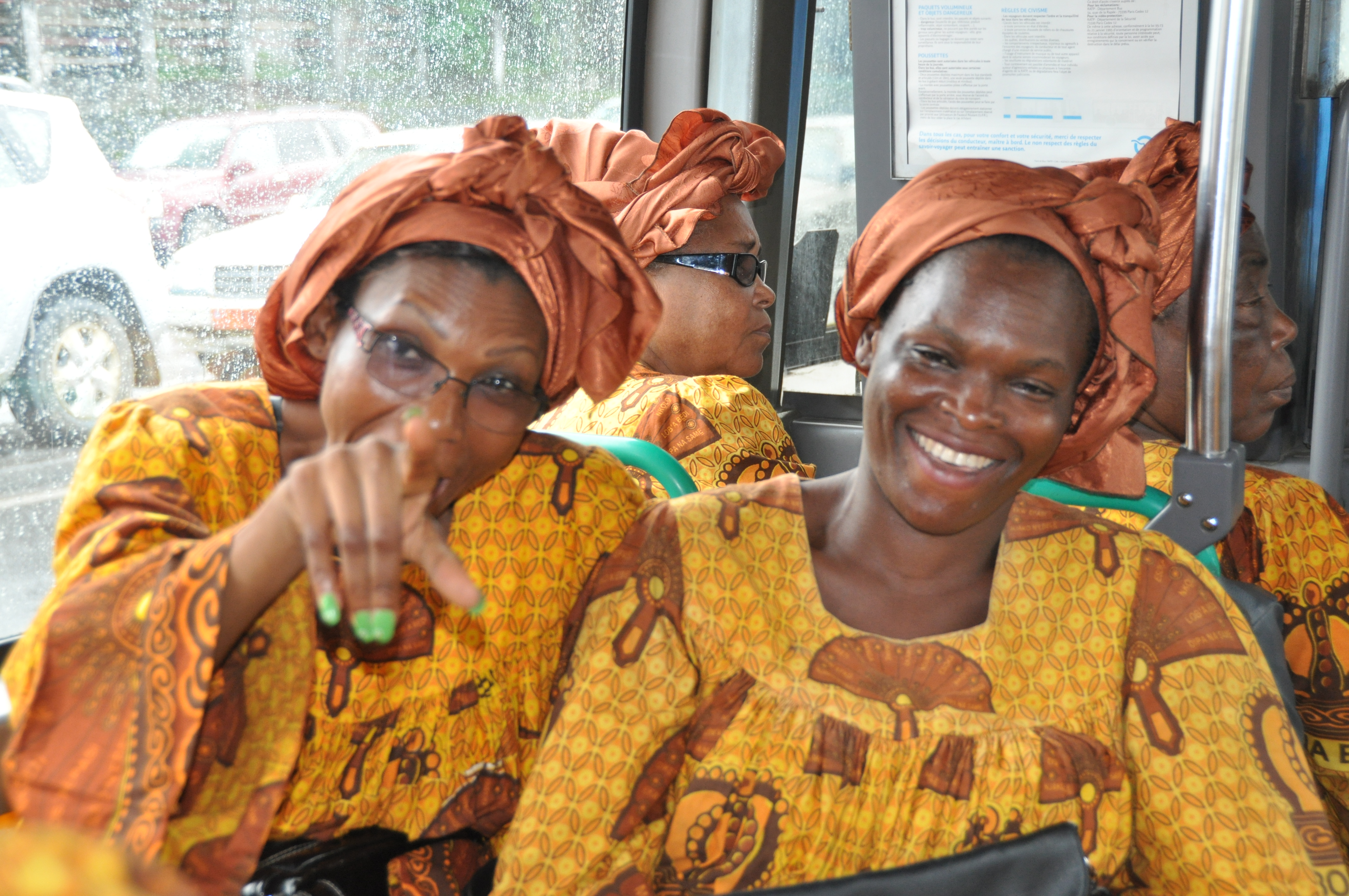

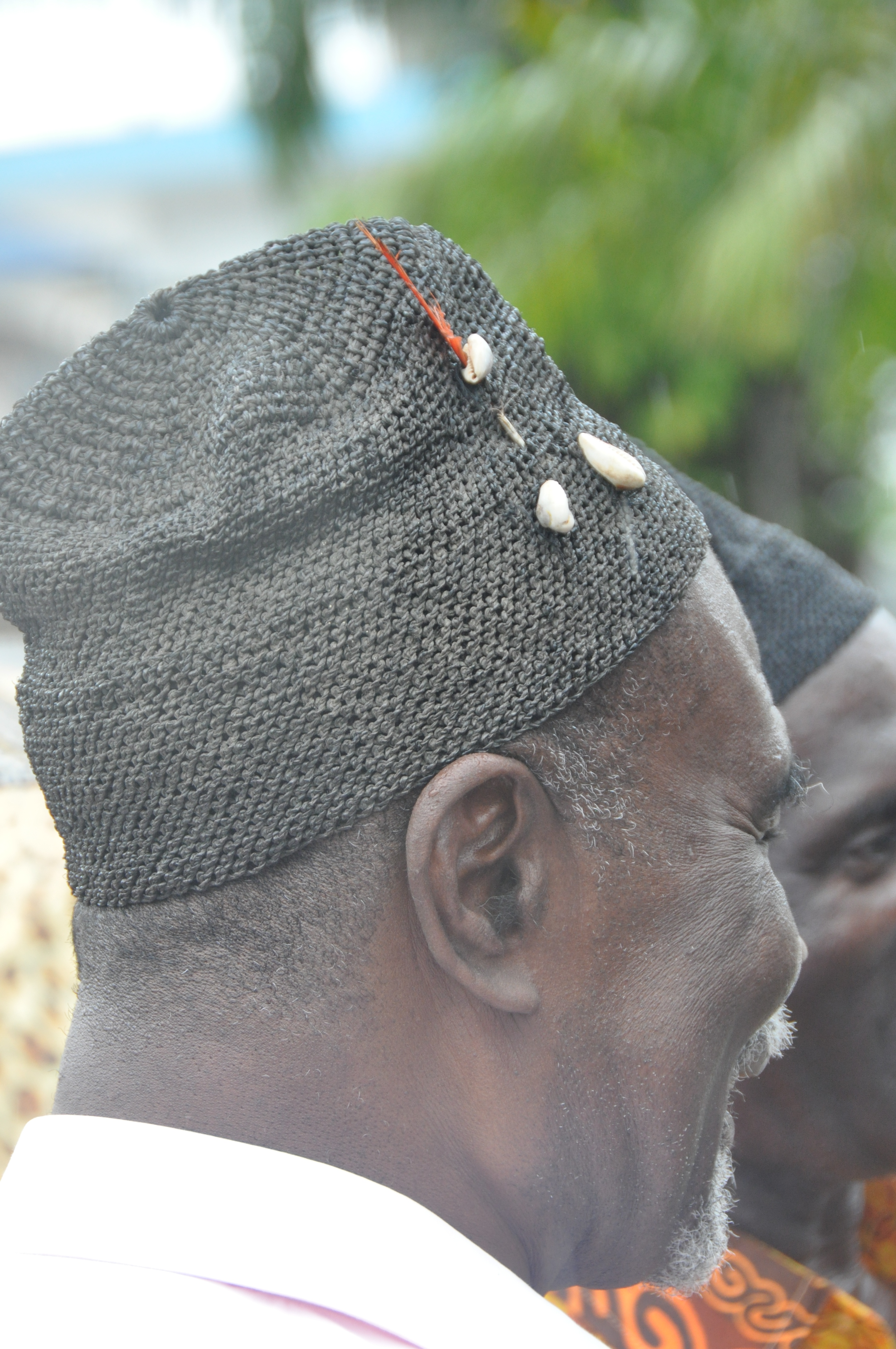

Monuments in the Region

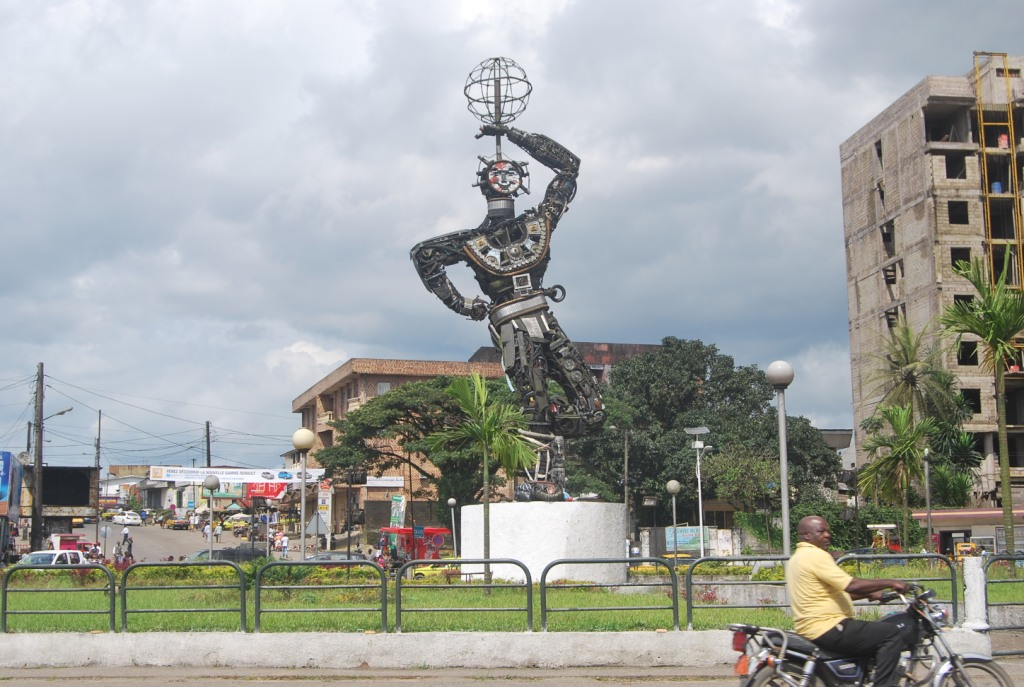
Statue of Liberty, Douala

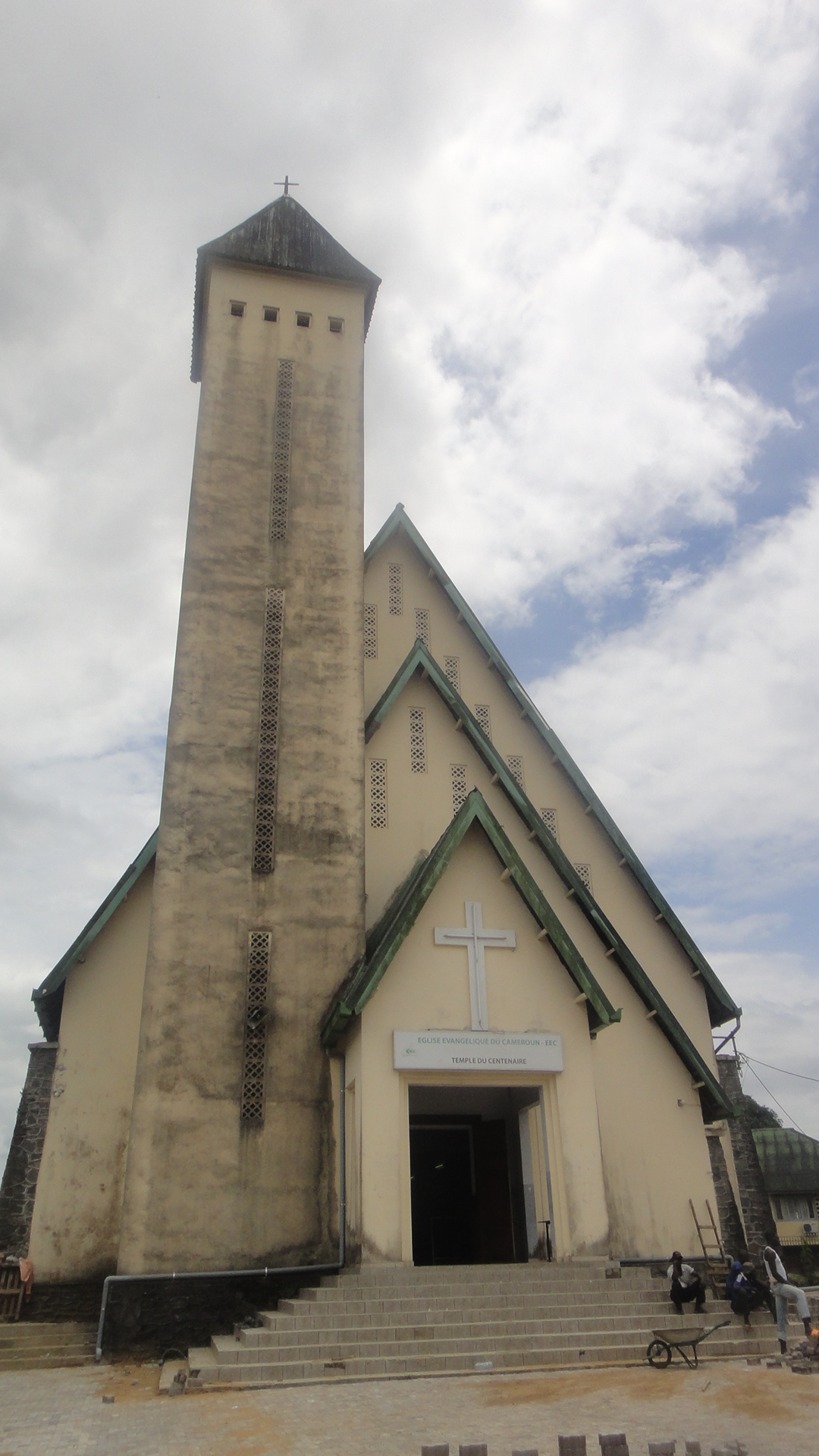
Temple du Centenaire, Douala

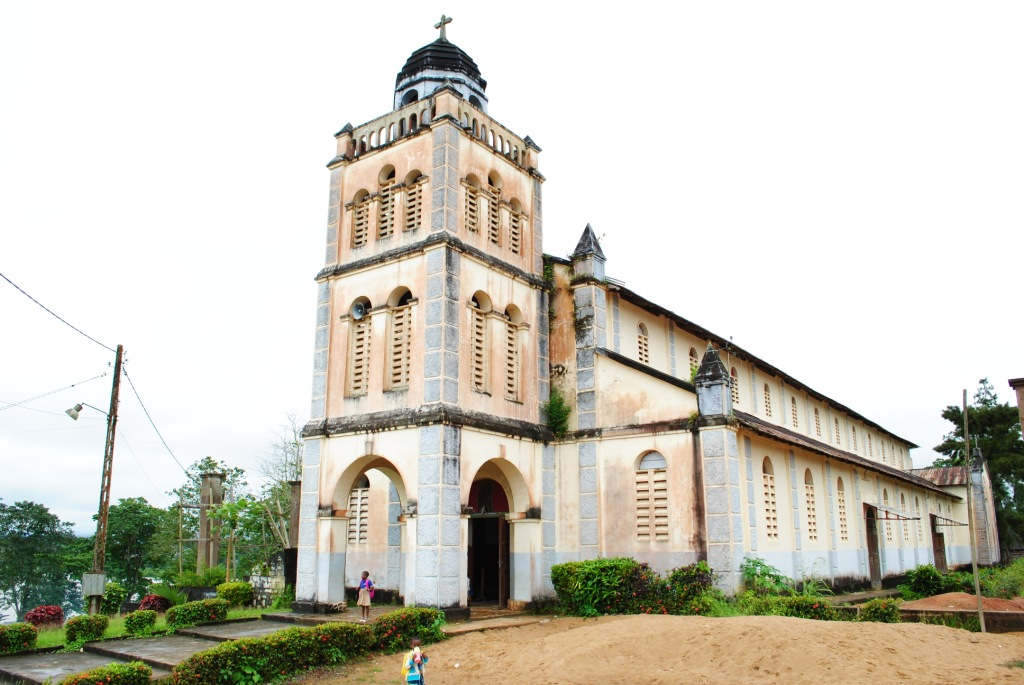
Cathedral in Edea

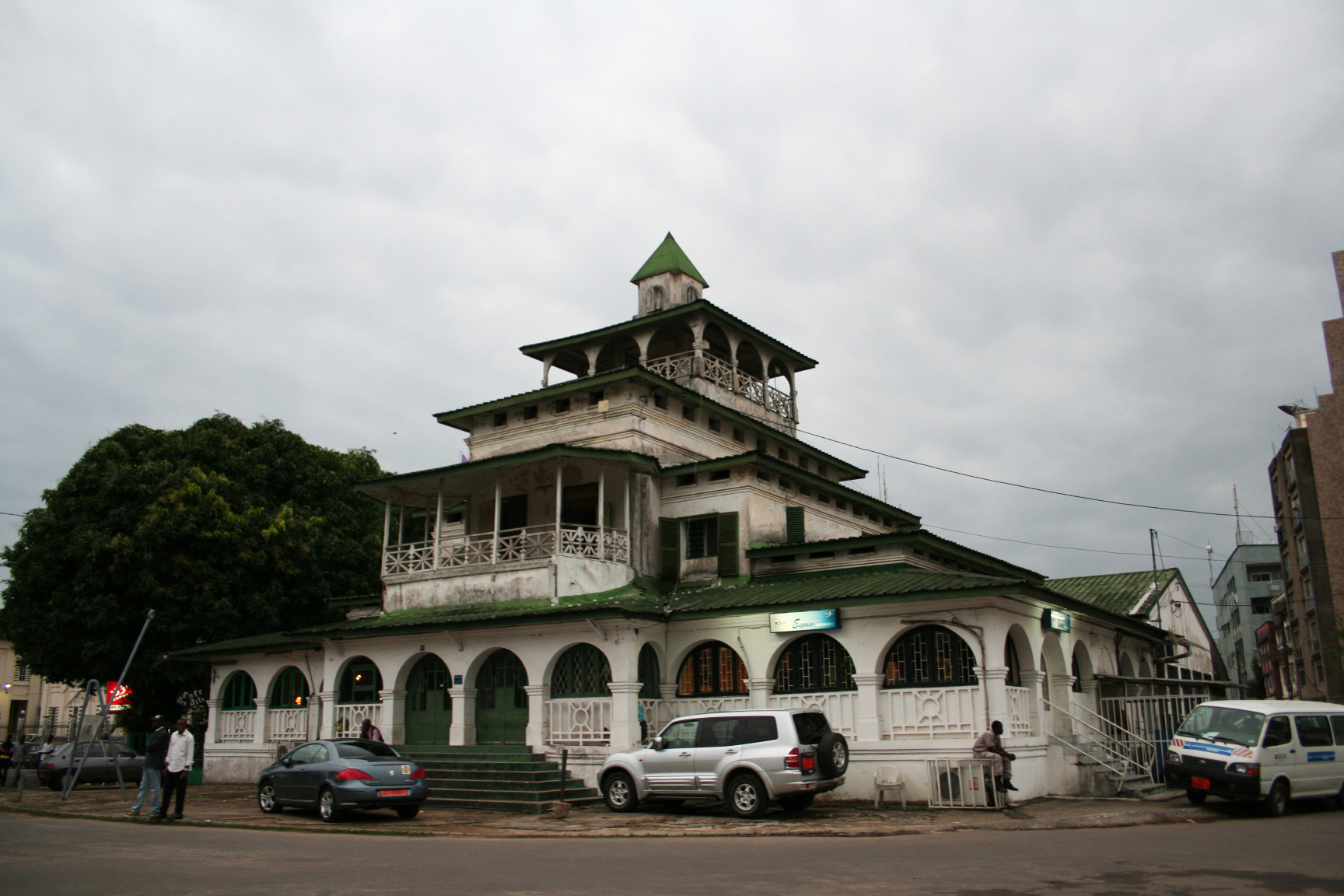
Kings Bell Palace, Douala

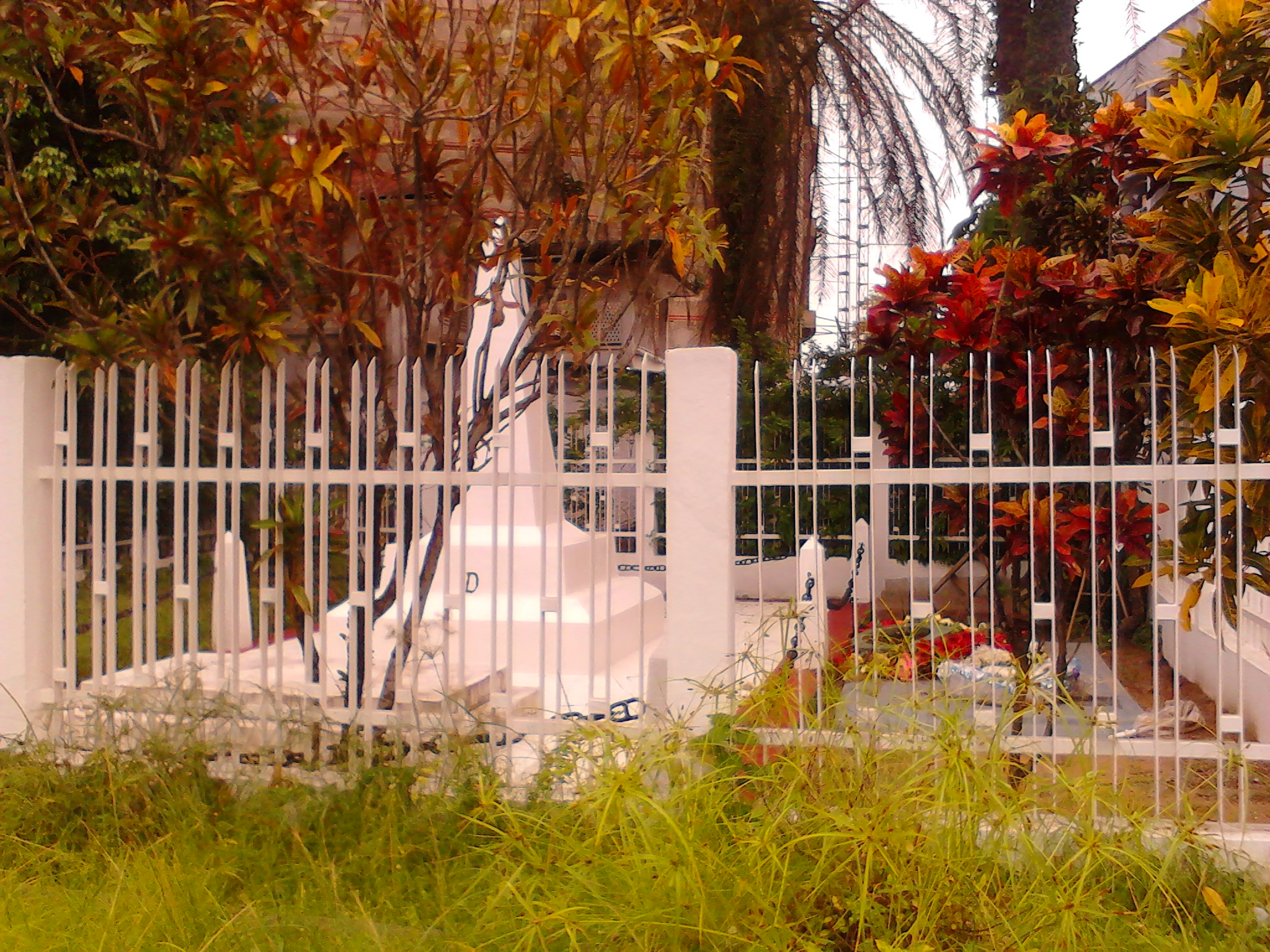
King Bell's Monument

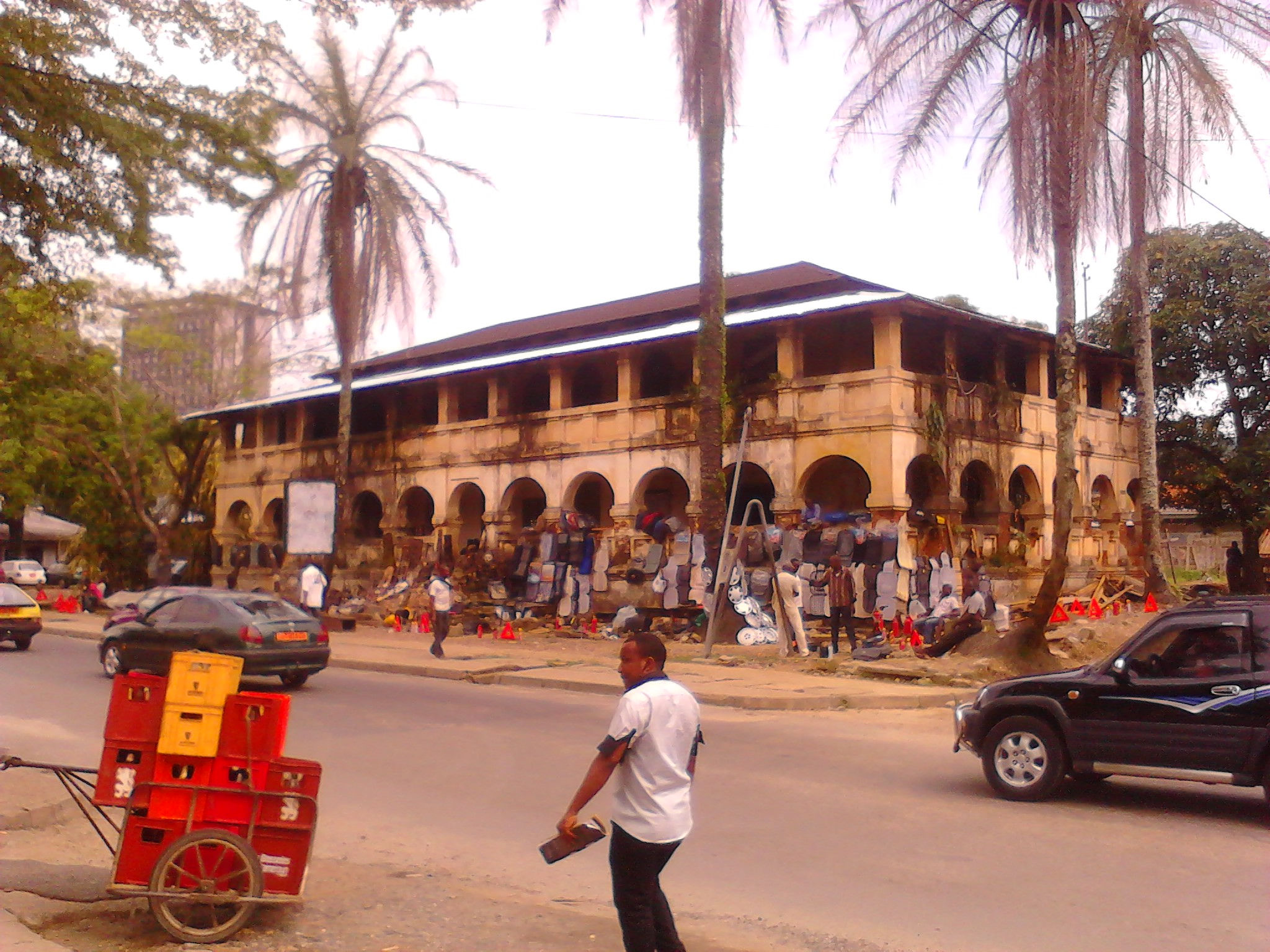
Villa Mandessi

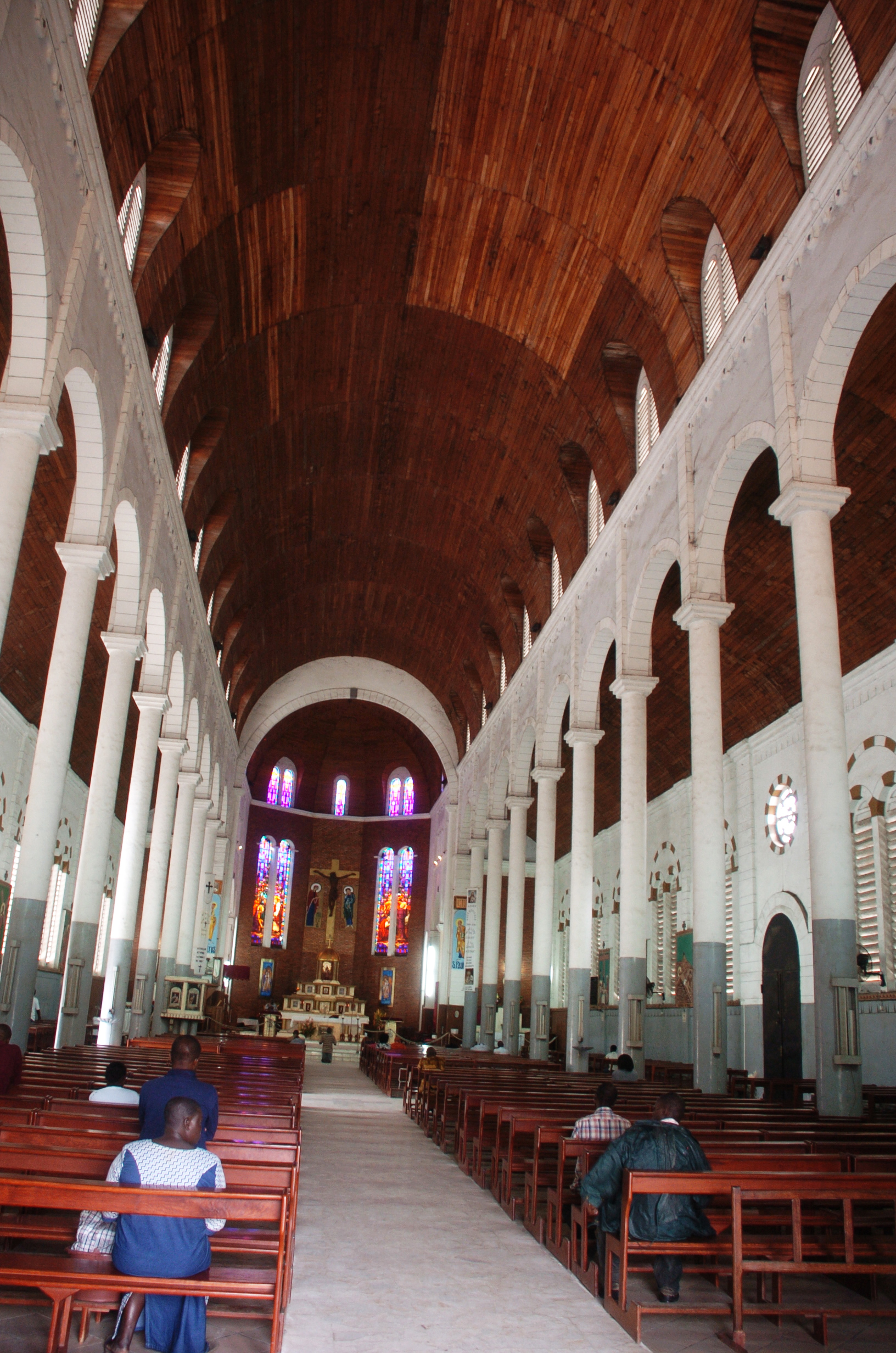
Inner view of the St Peter & Paul Cathedral in Douala

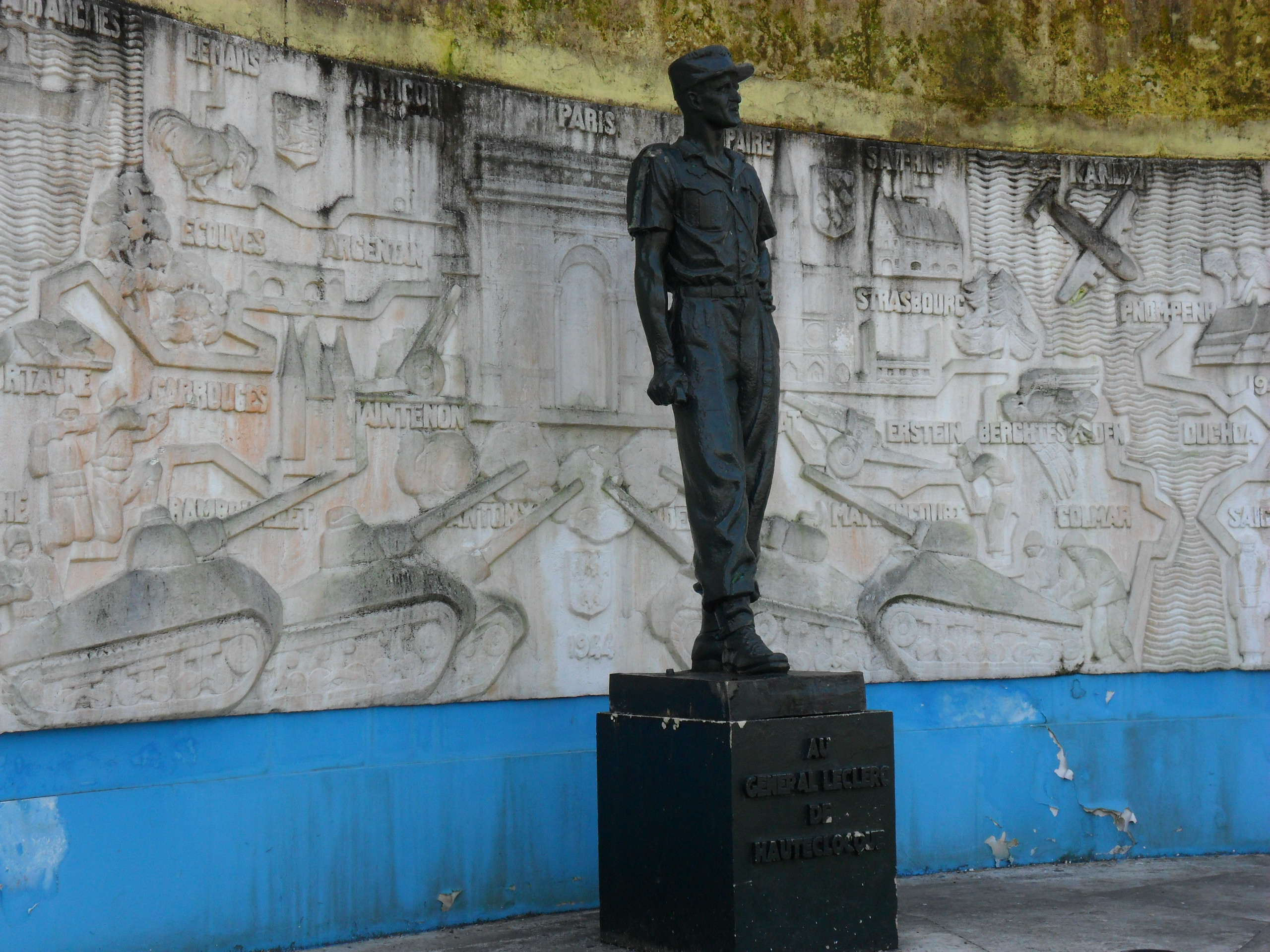
Monument of General Leclerc in Douala

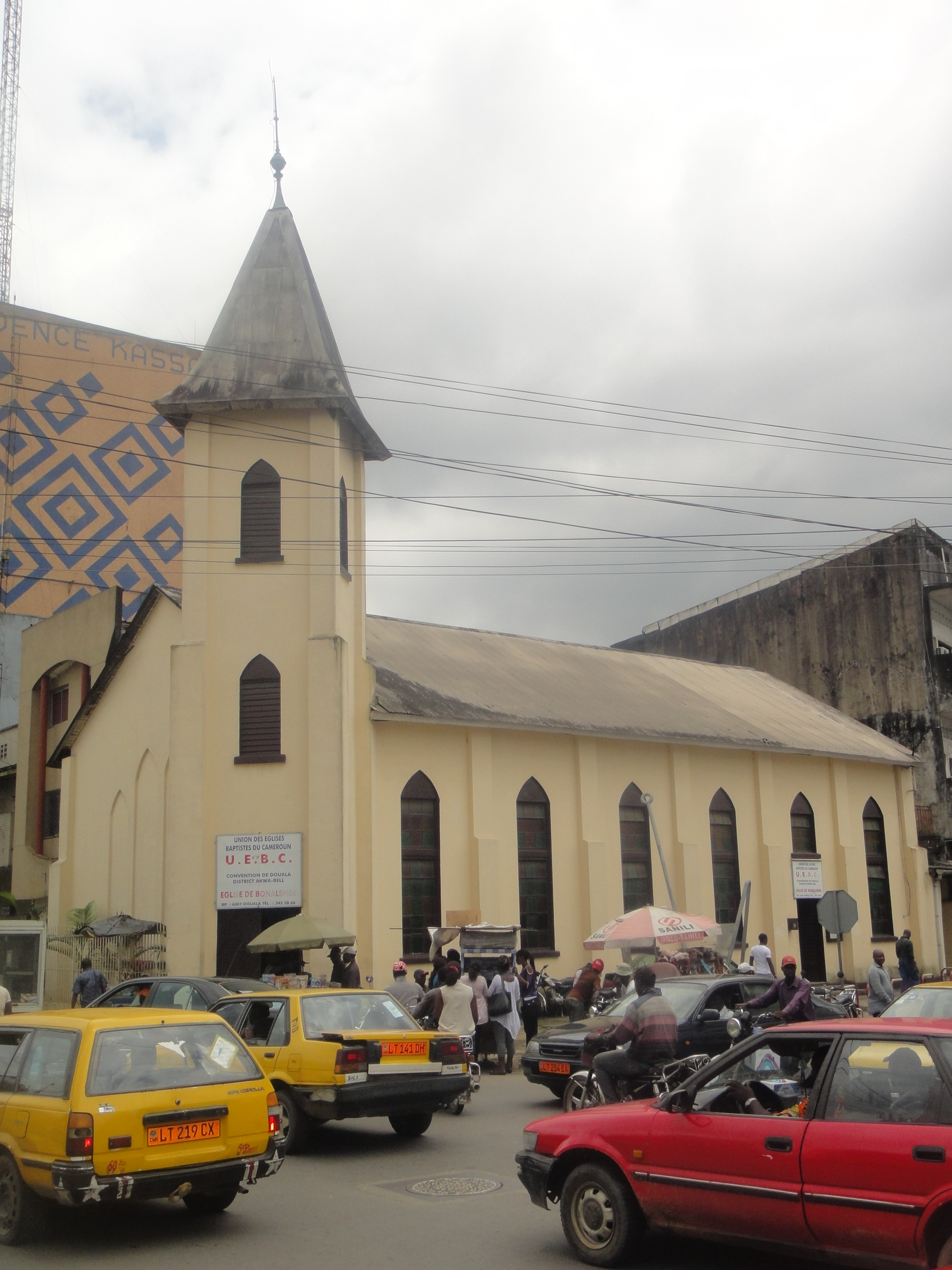
Bonalembe Temple, Douala

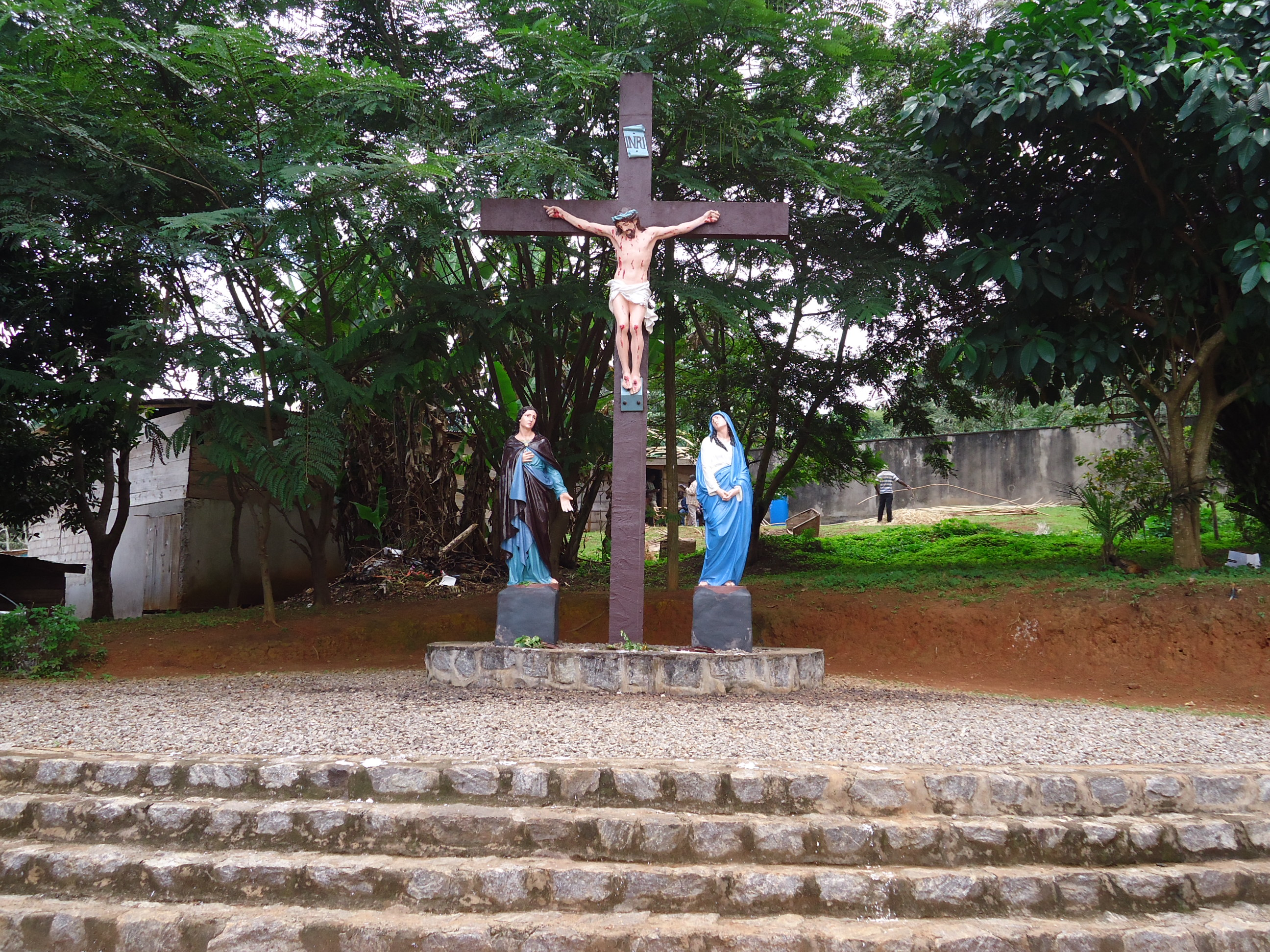
The Benedictine

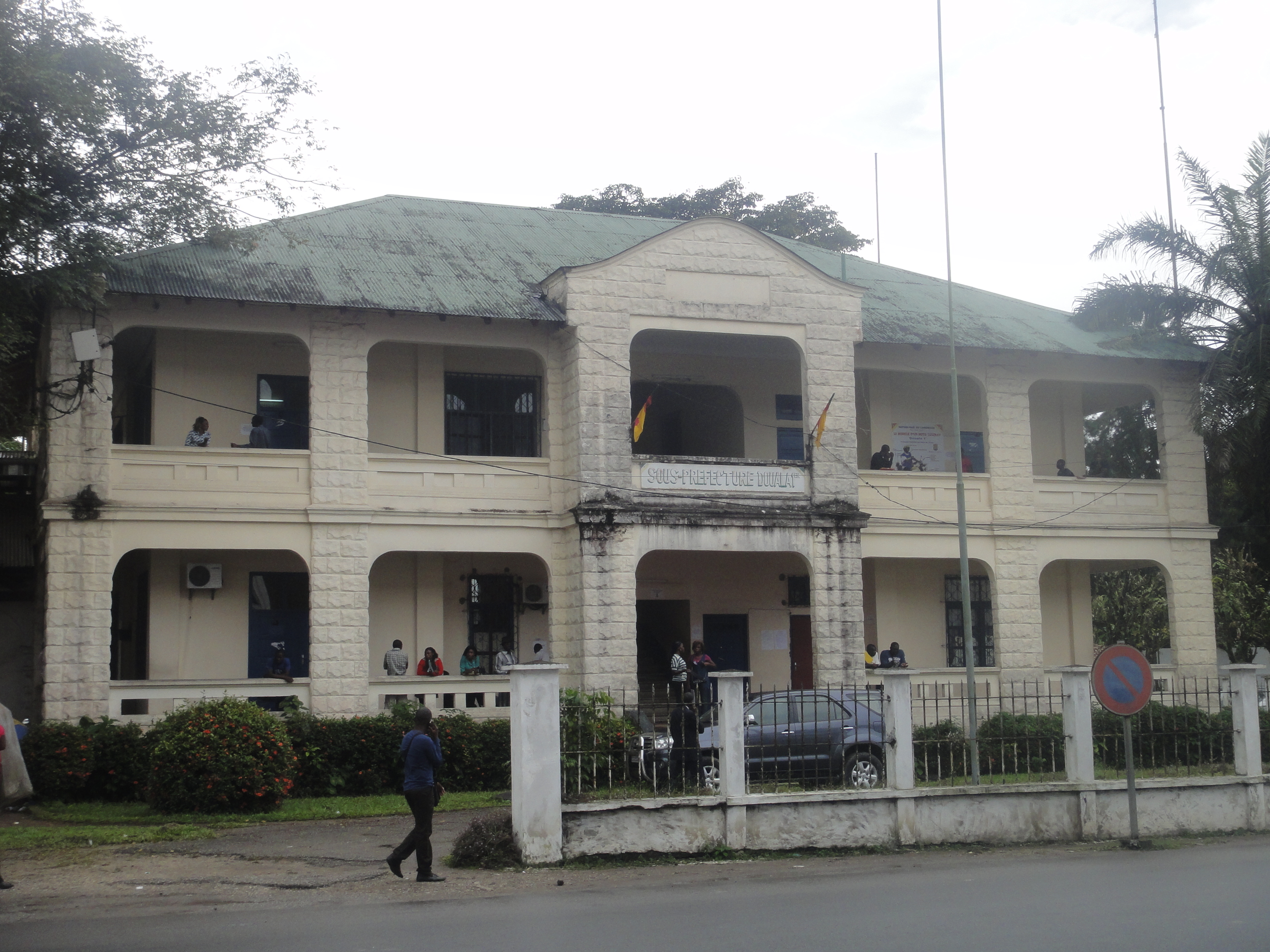
Ancient Residence of the District Chief in Douala

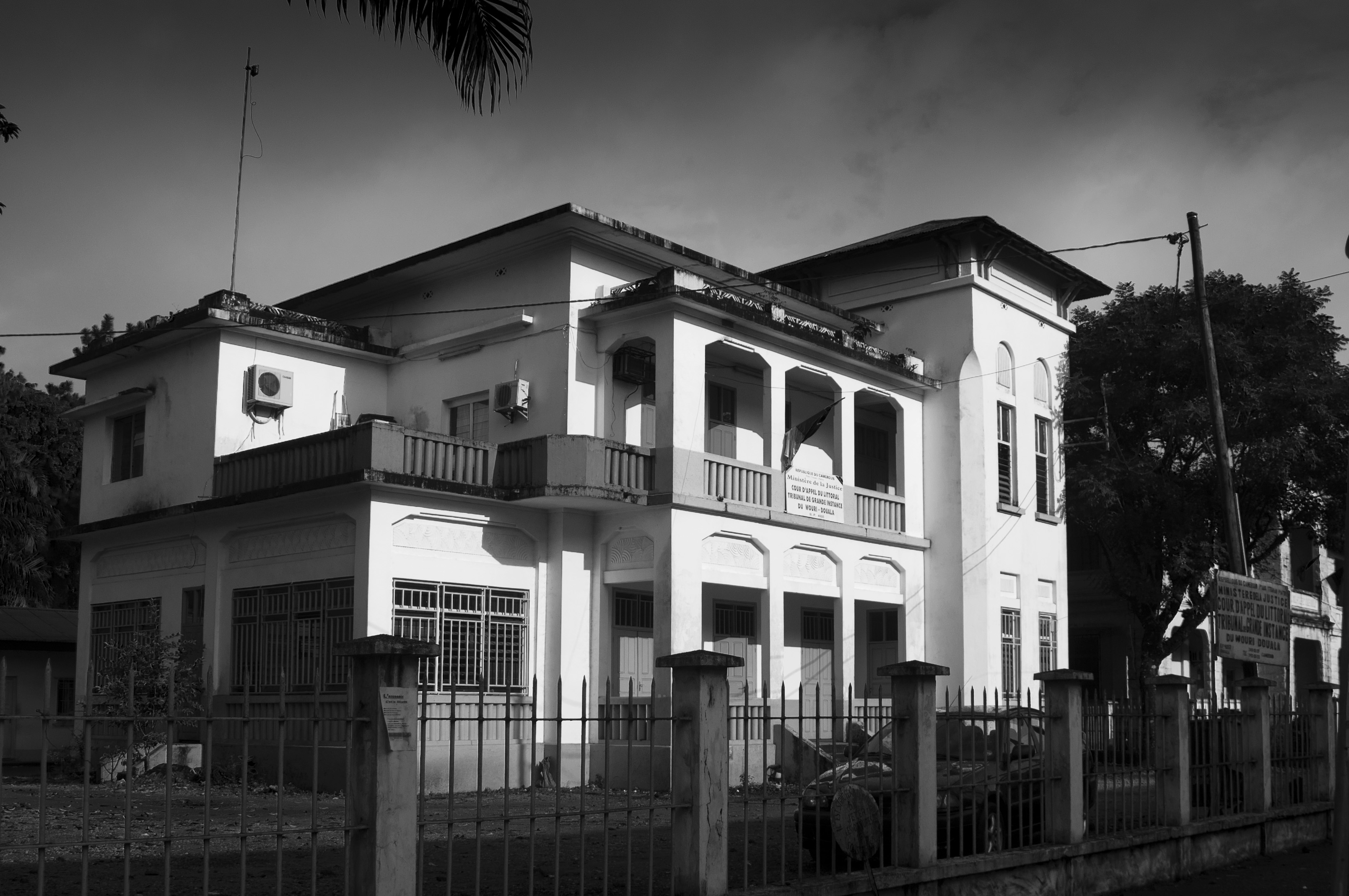
Former residence of the head of constituency

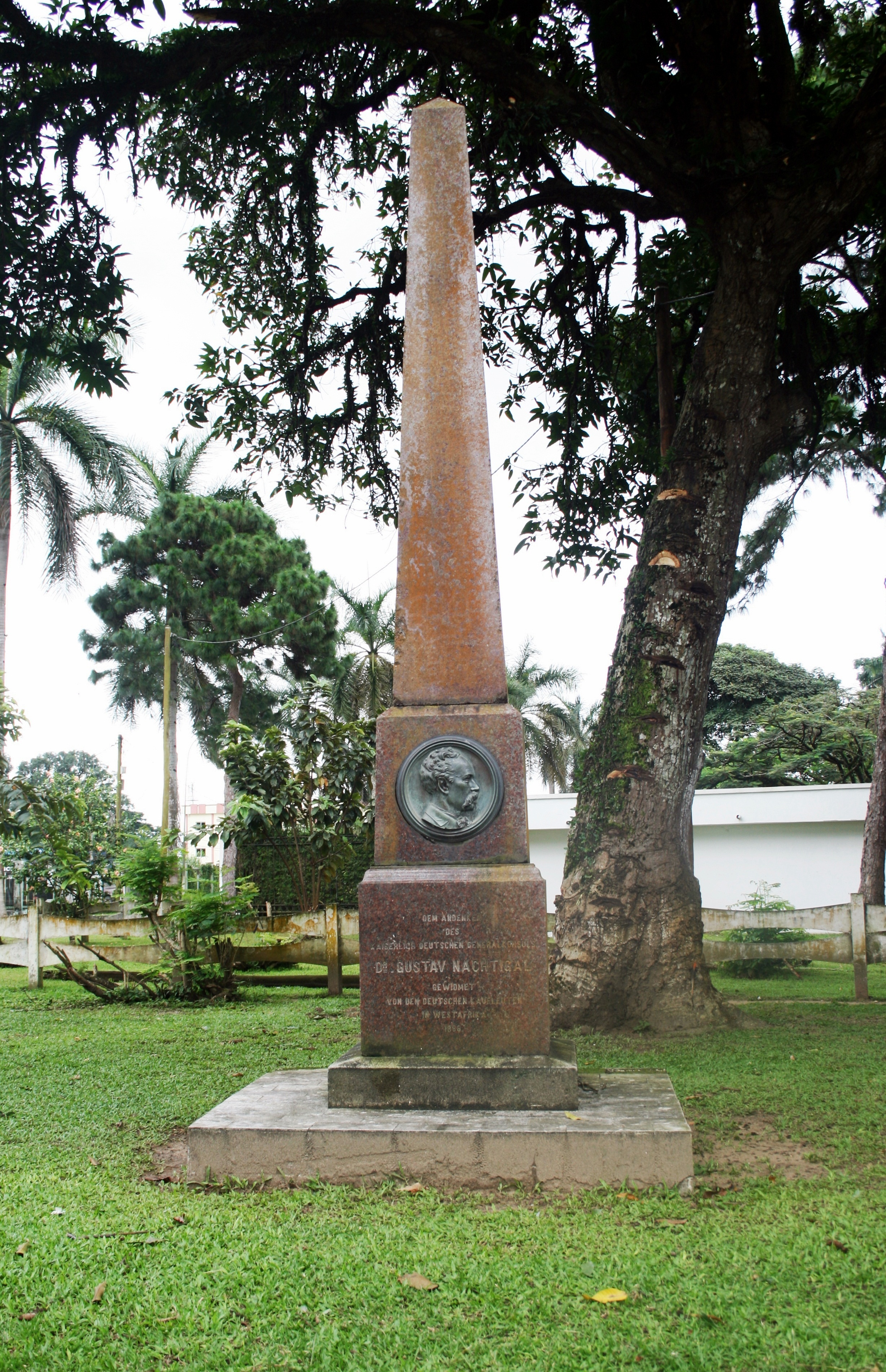
Monument of Gustav Nachtigal, Douala

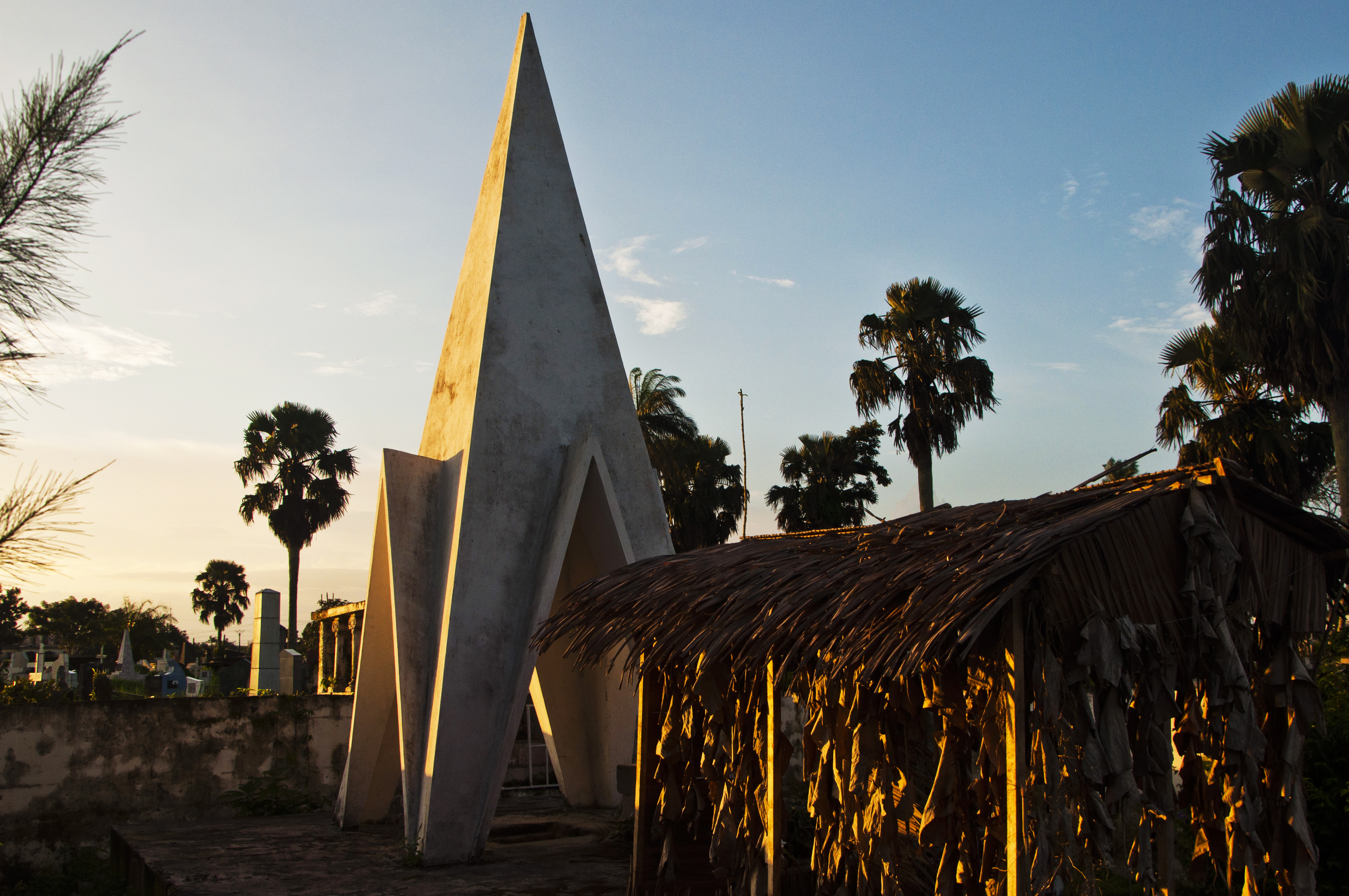
Monument of Ngosso Din, Douala

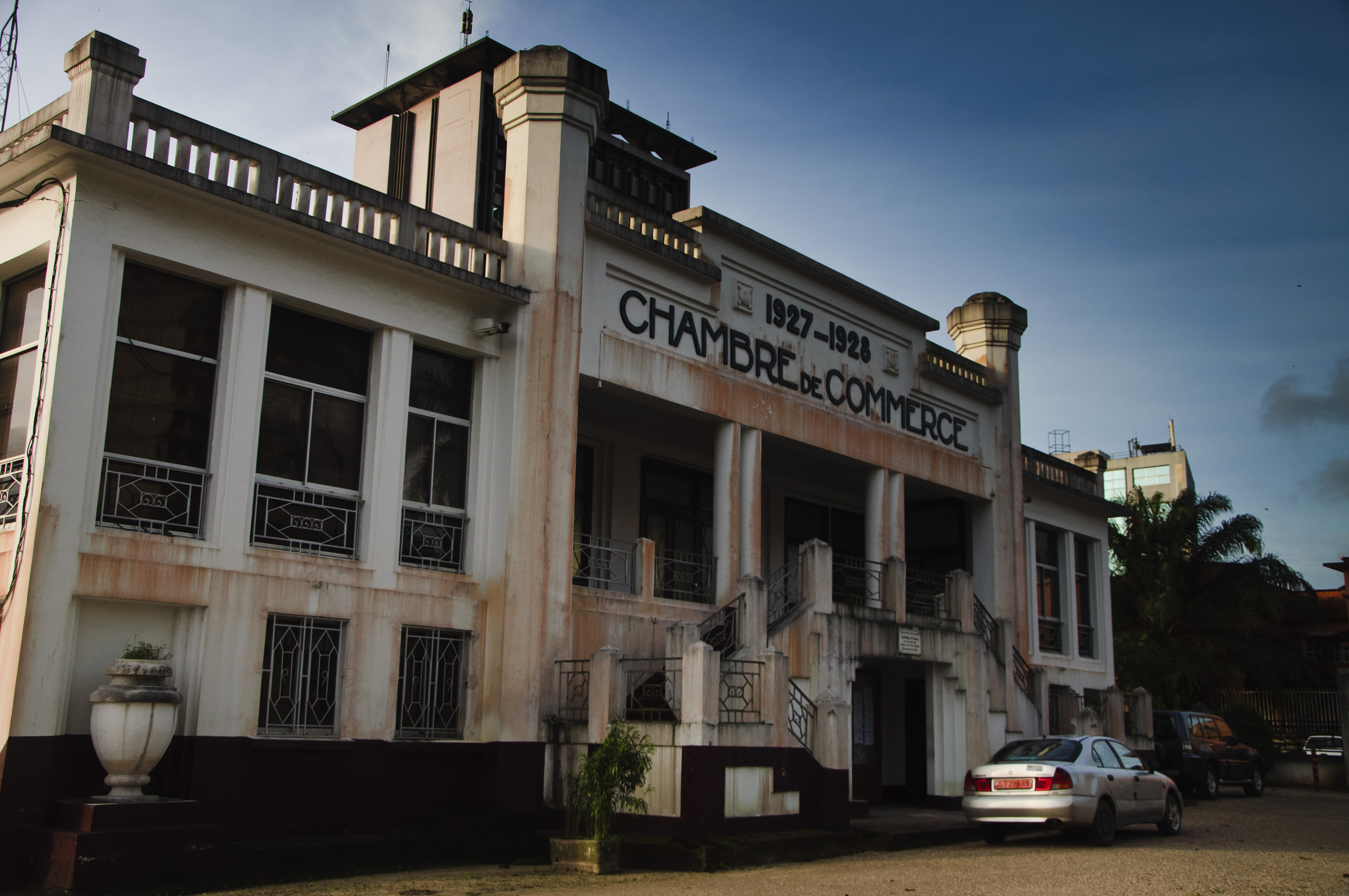
Chamber of Commerce, Douala

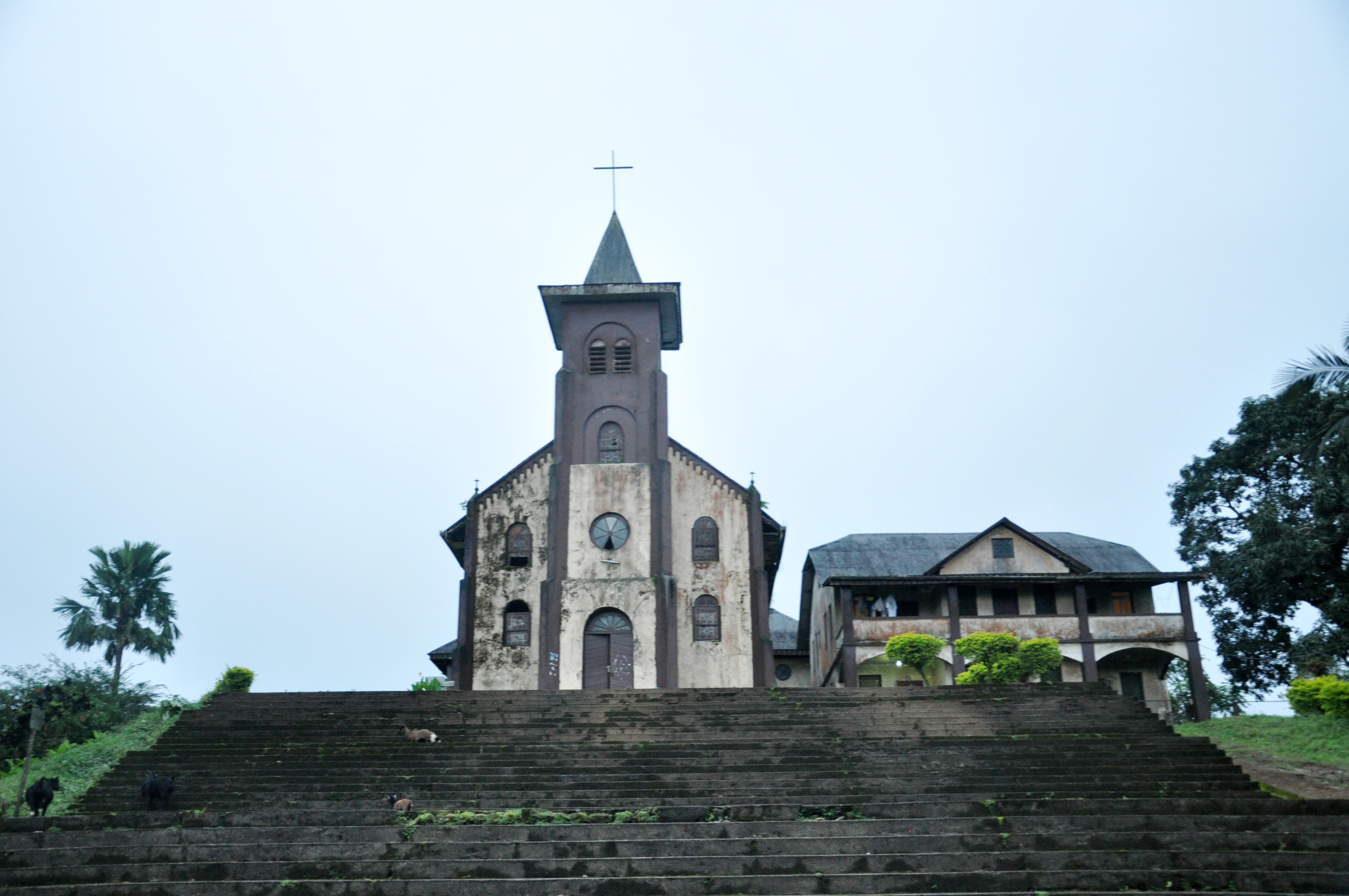
St Engelbert Cathedral

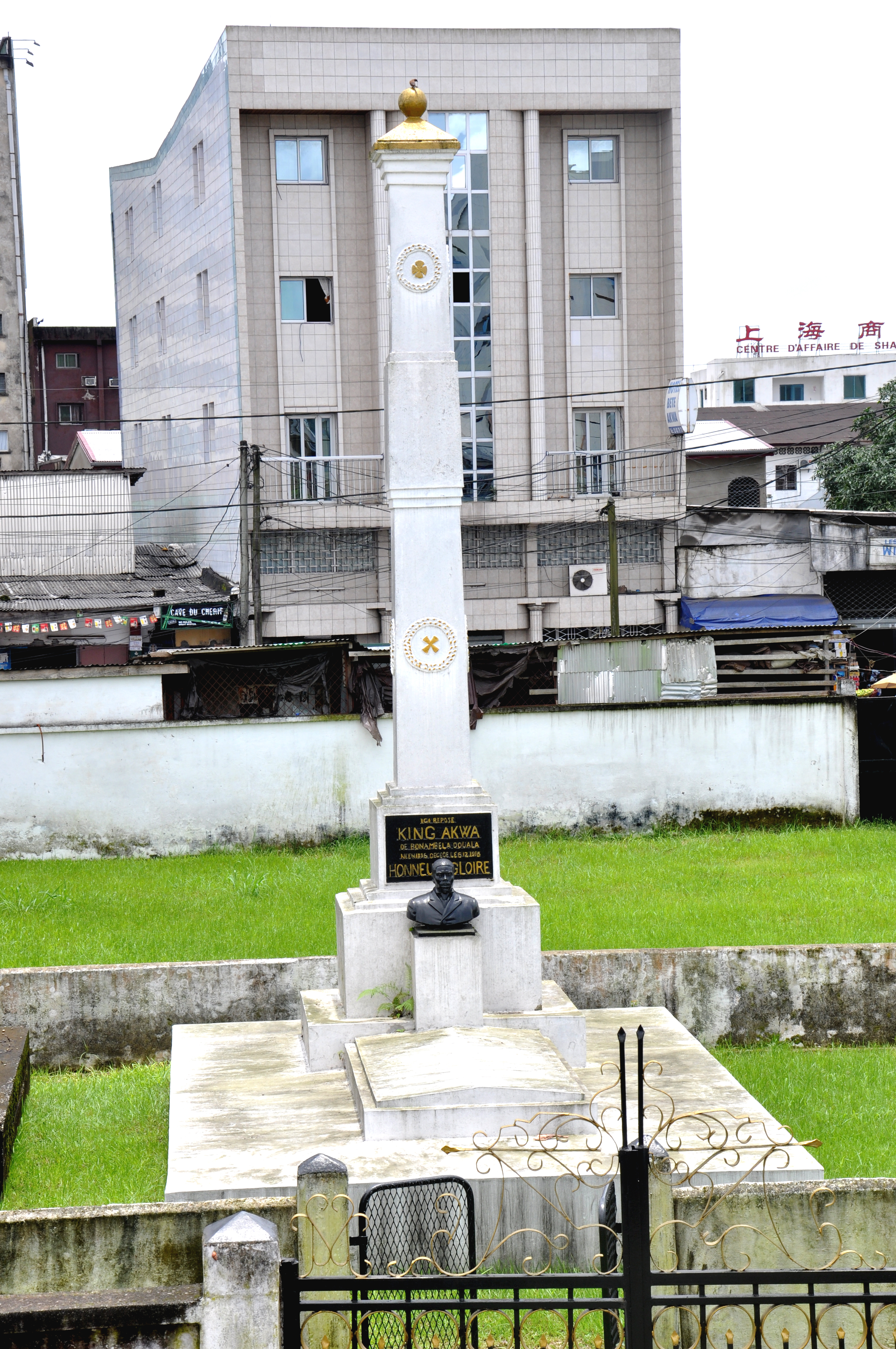
Tomb of King Akwa in Douala

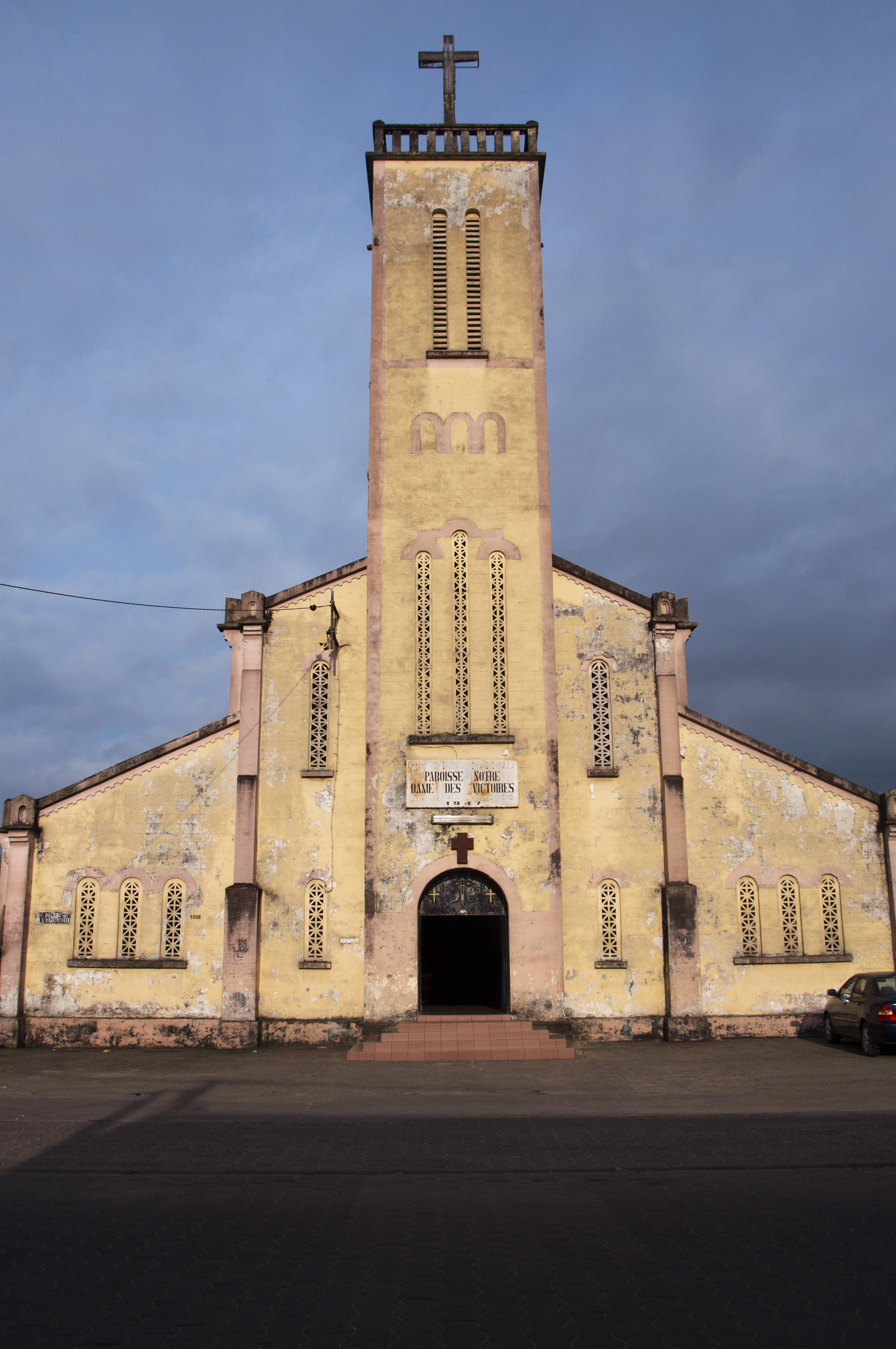
Our Lady Victories in New Bell, Douala

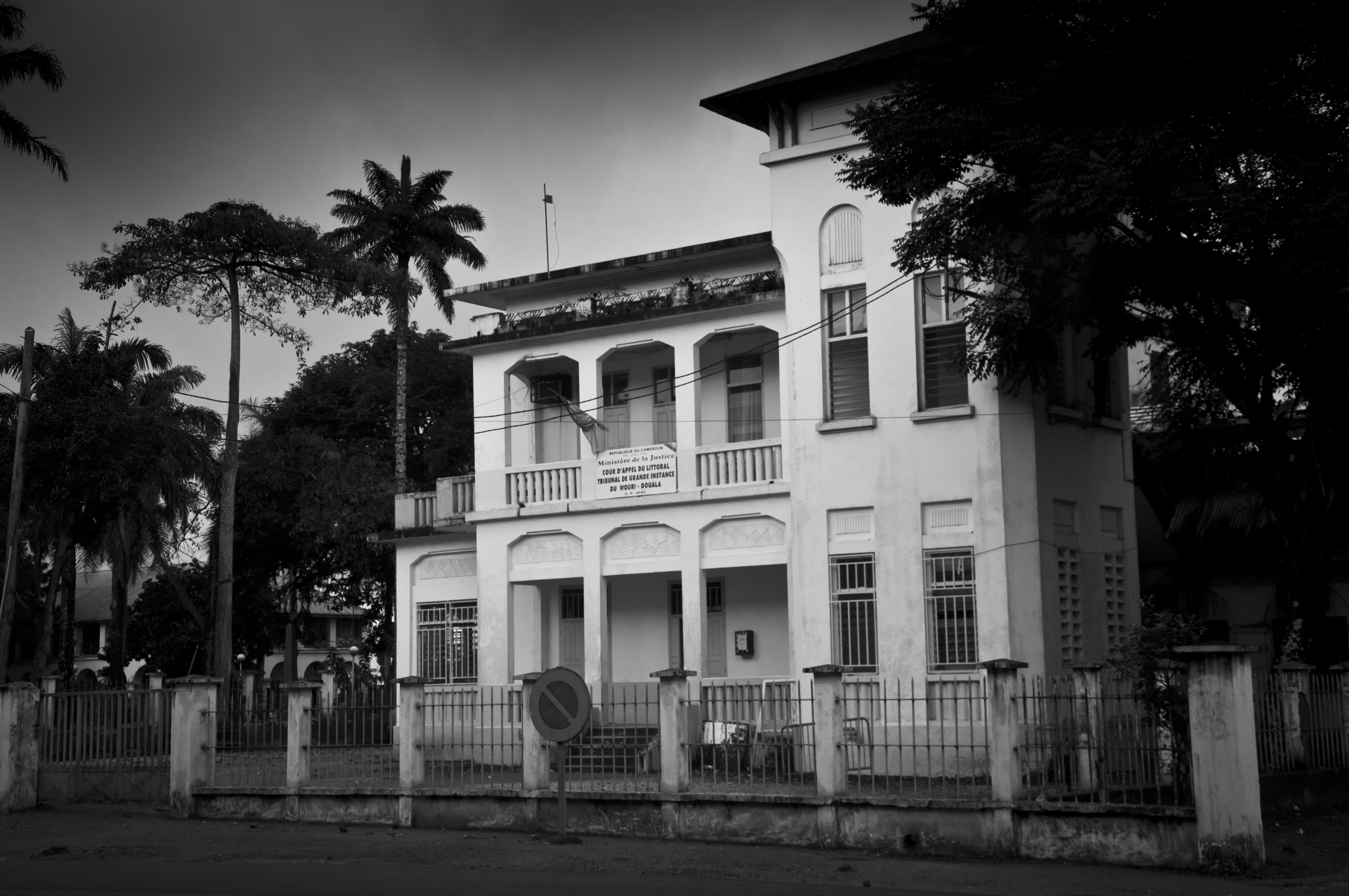
Former residence of the head of constituency

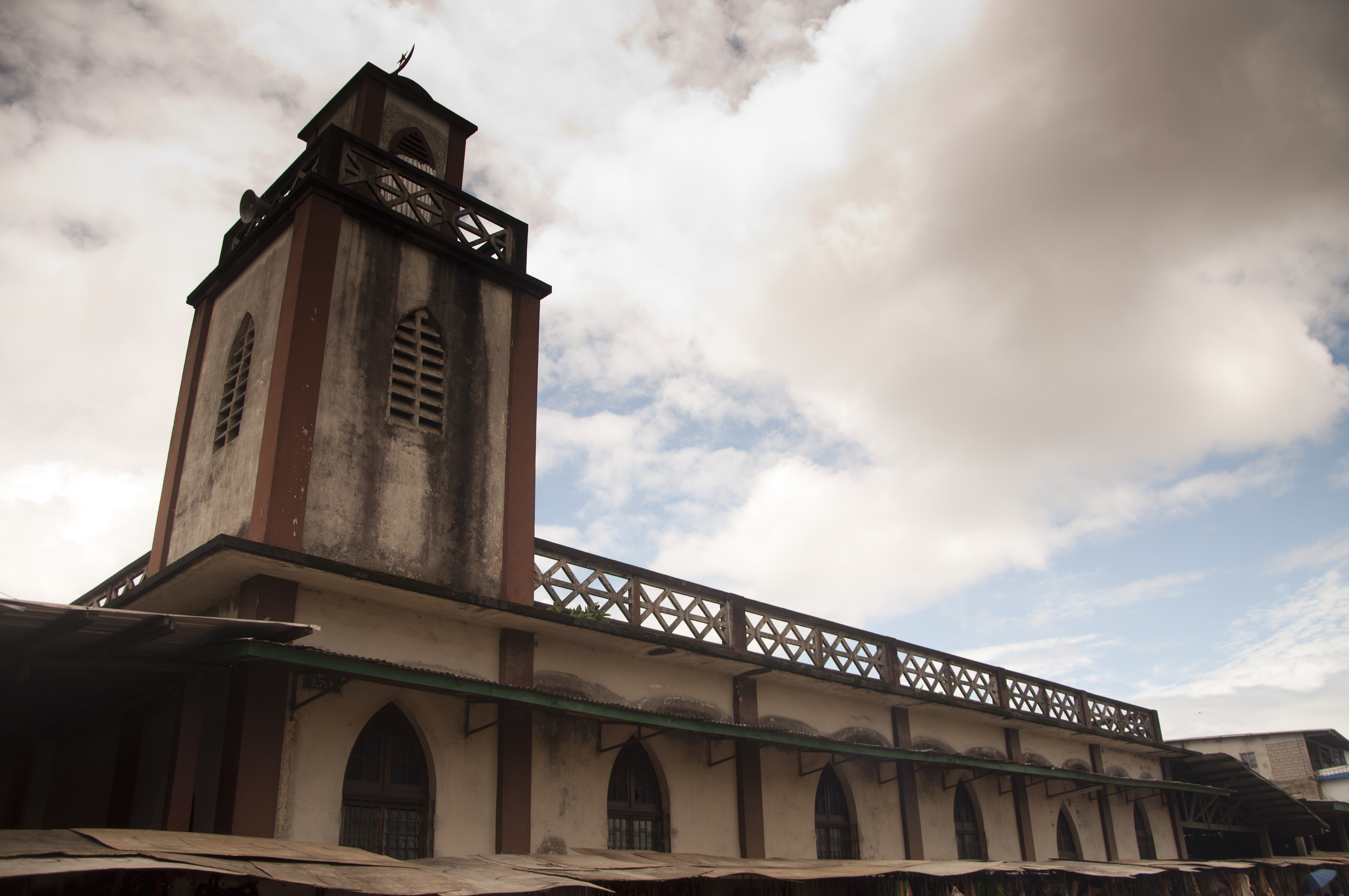
New Bell Central Mosque

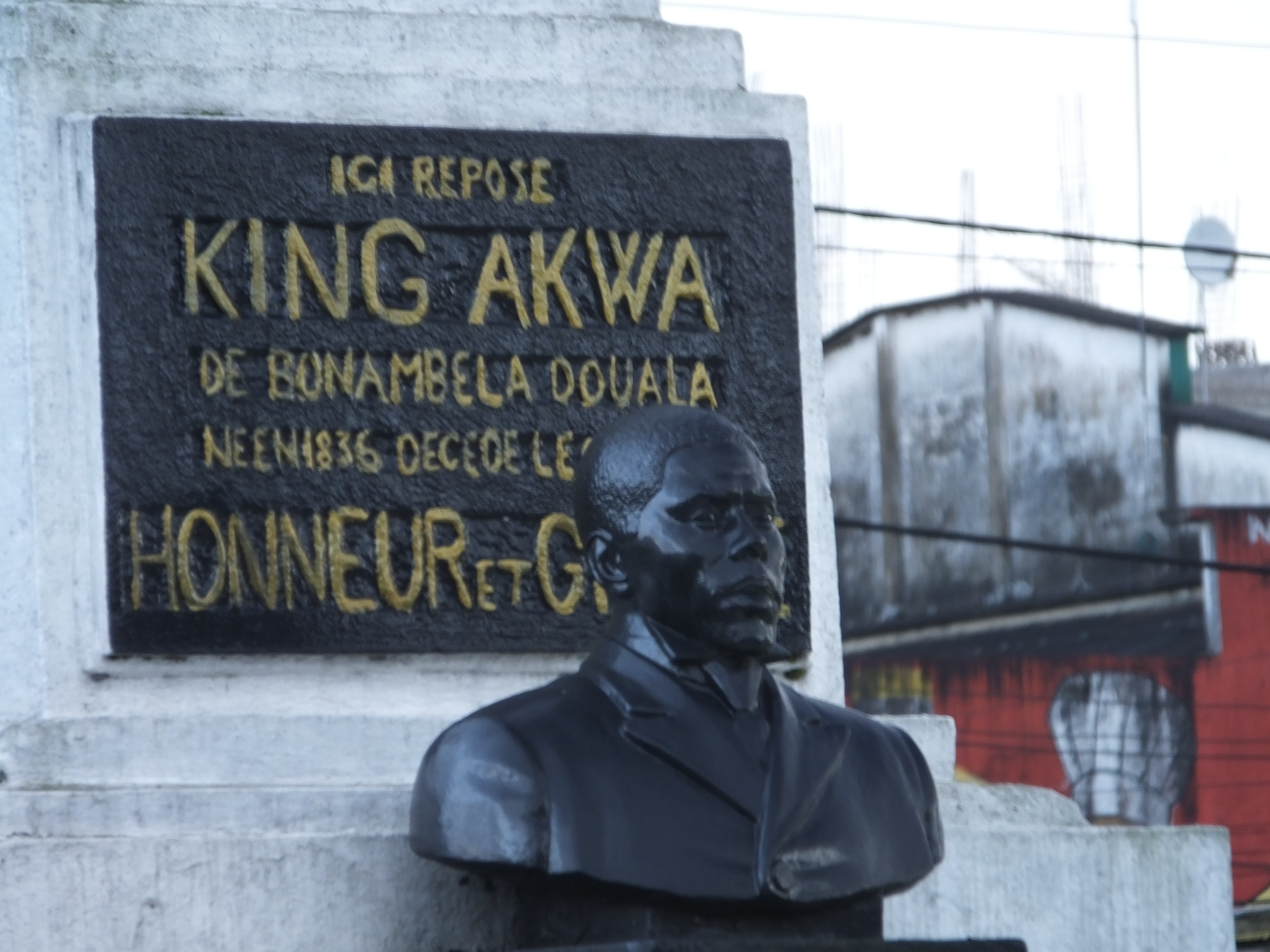
Monument of King Akwa in Douala

Common Dishes in the Region

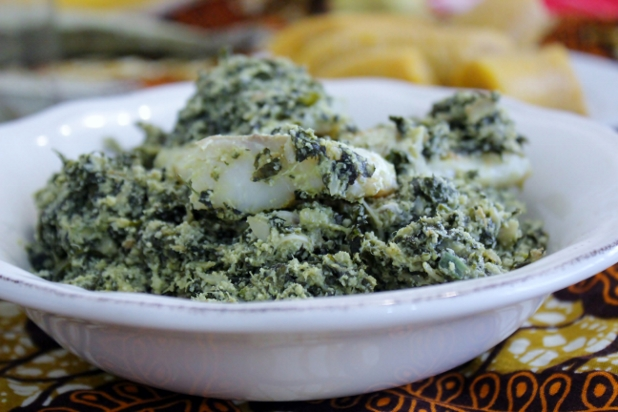
Ndole

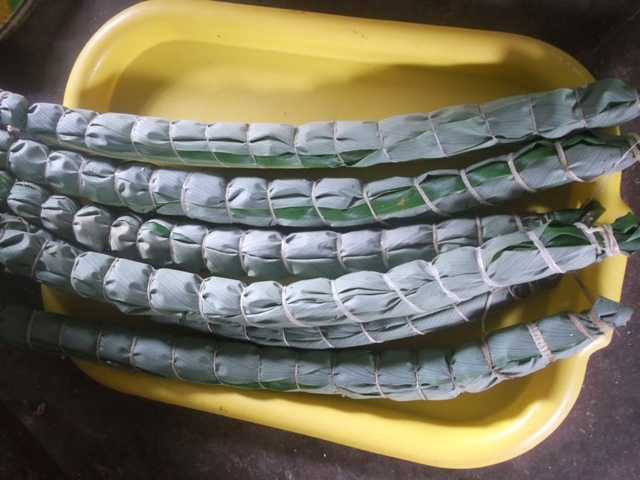
Soaked cassava flour (Bobolo)

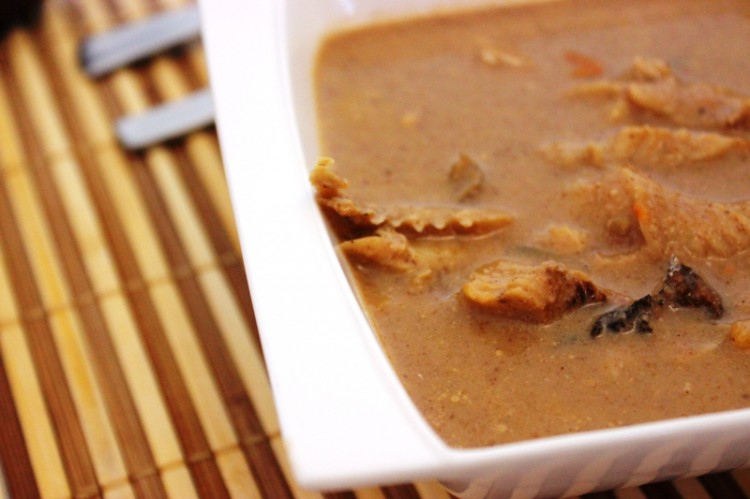
Groundnut soup

=== Wildlife ===
Animals in the Douala Edea Wildlife Reserve

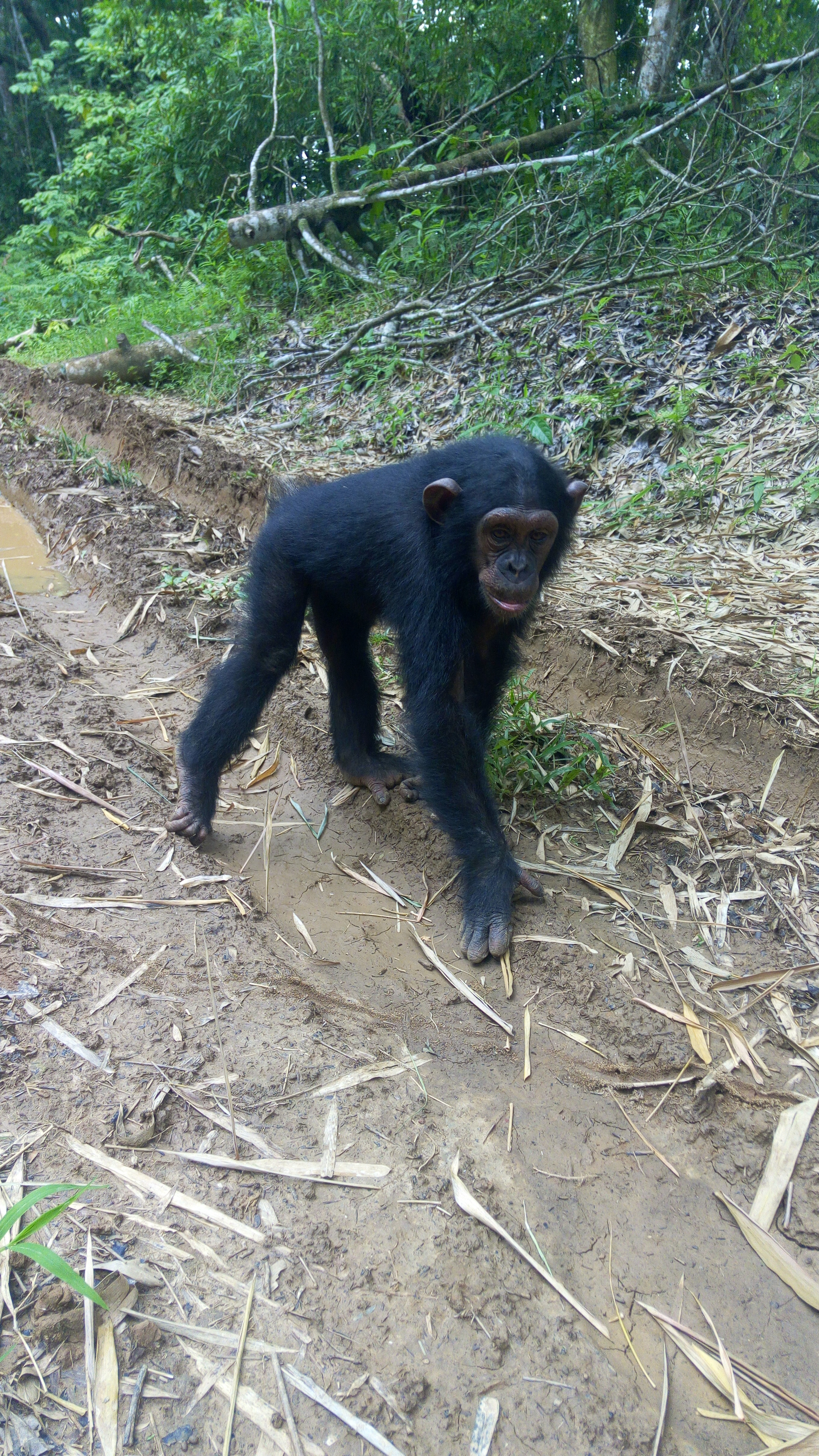
Chimpanzee

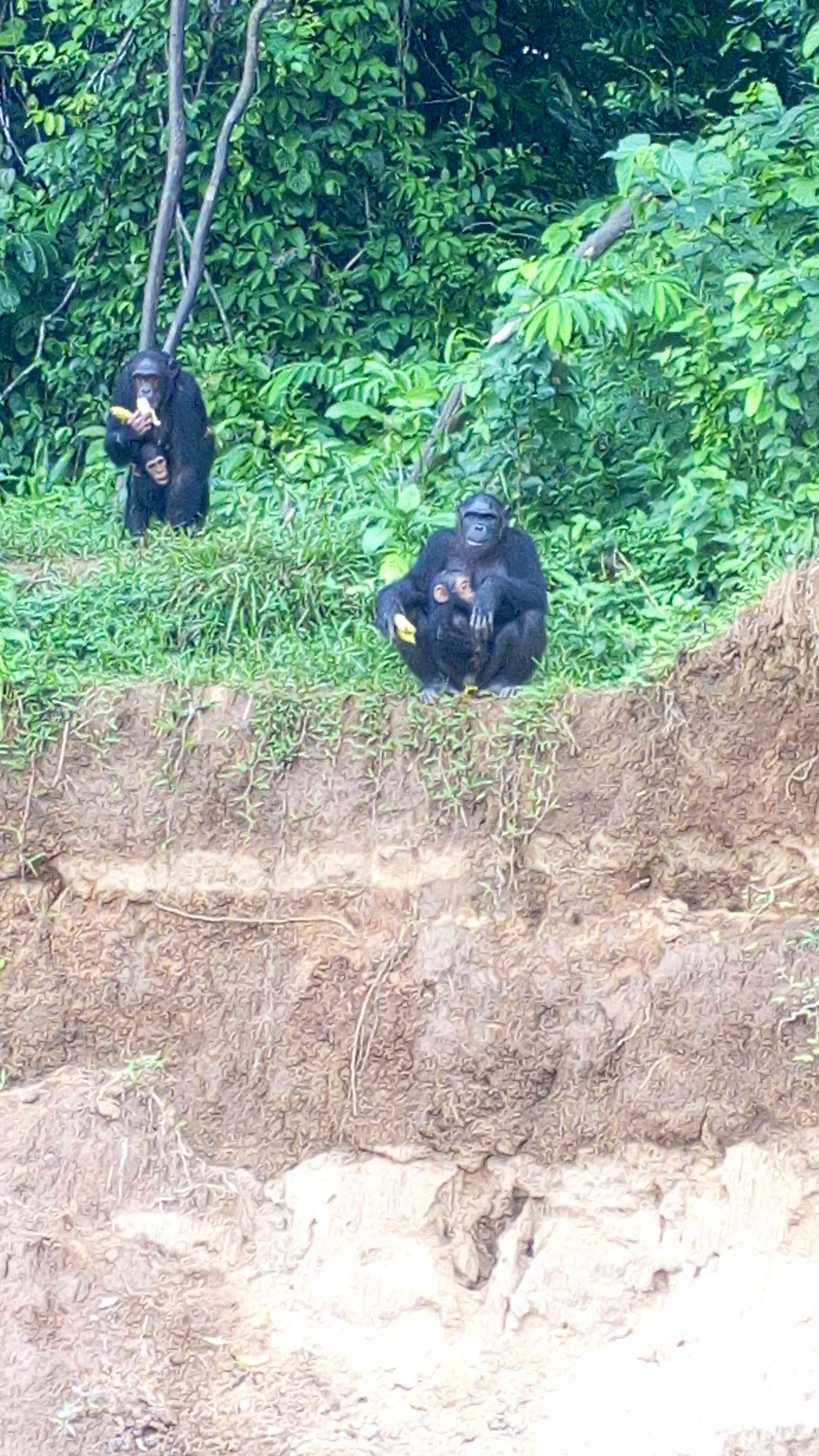
Chimpanzees

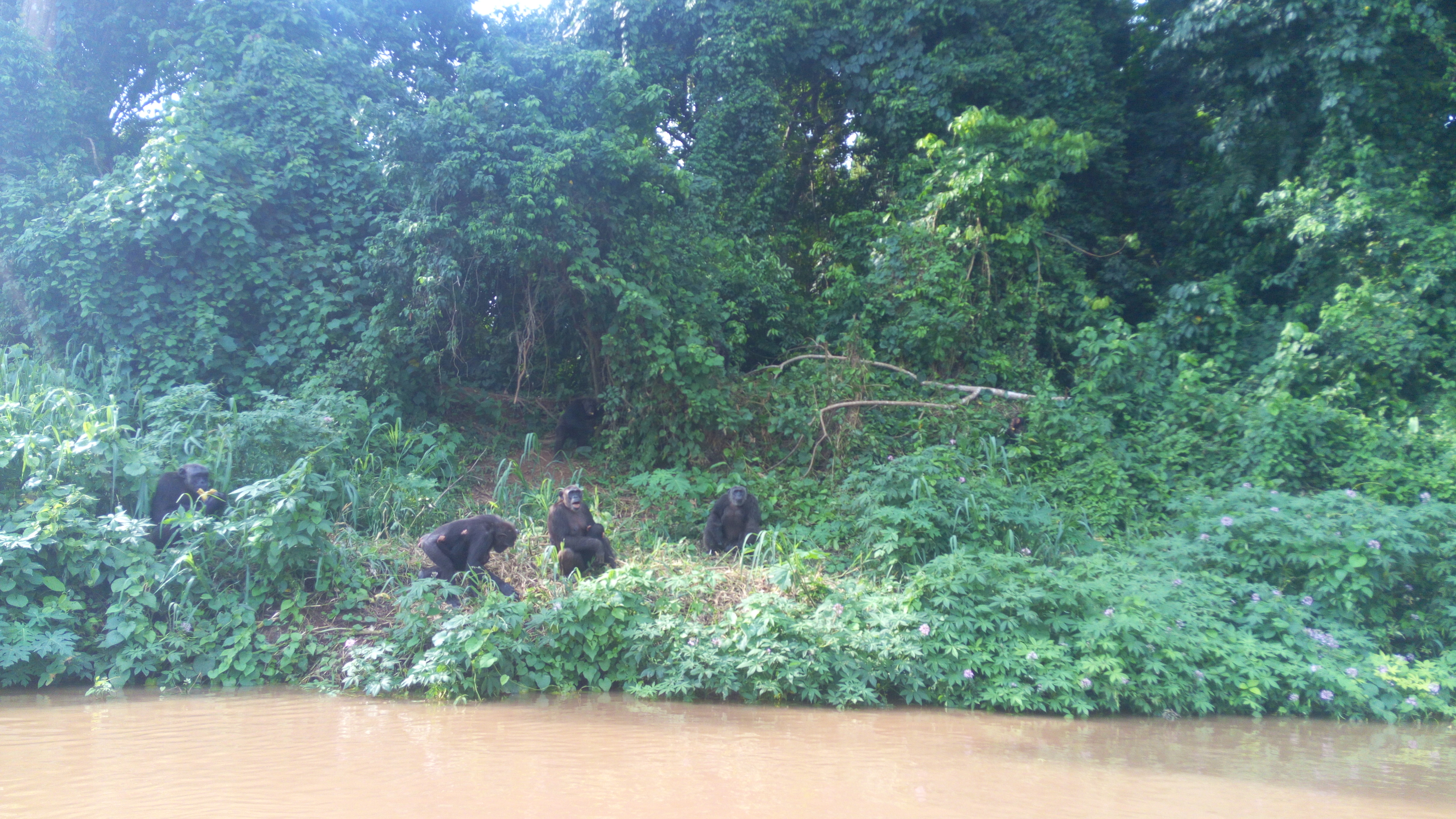
Chimpanzees

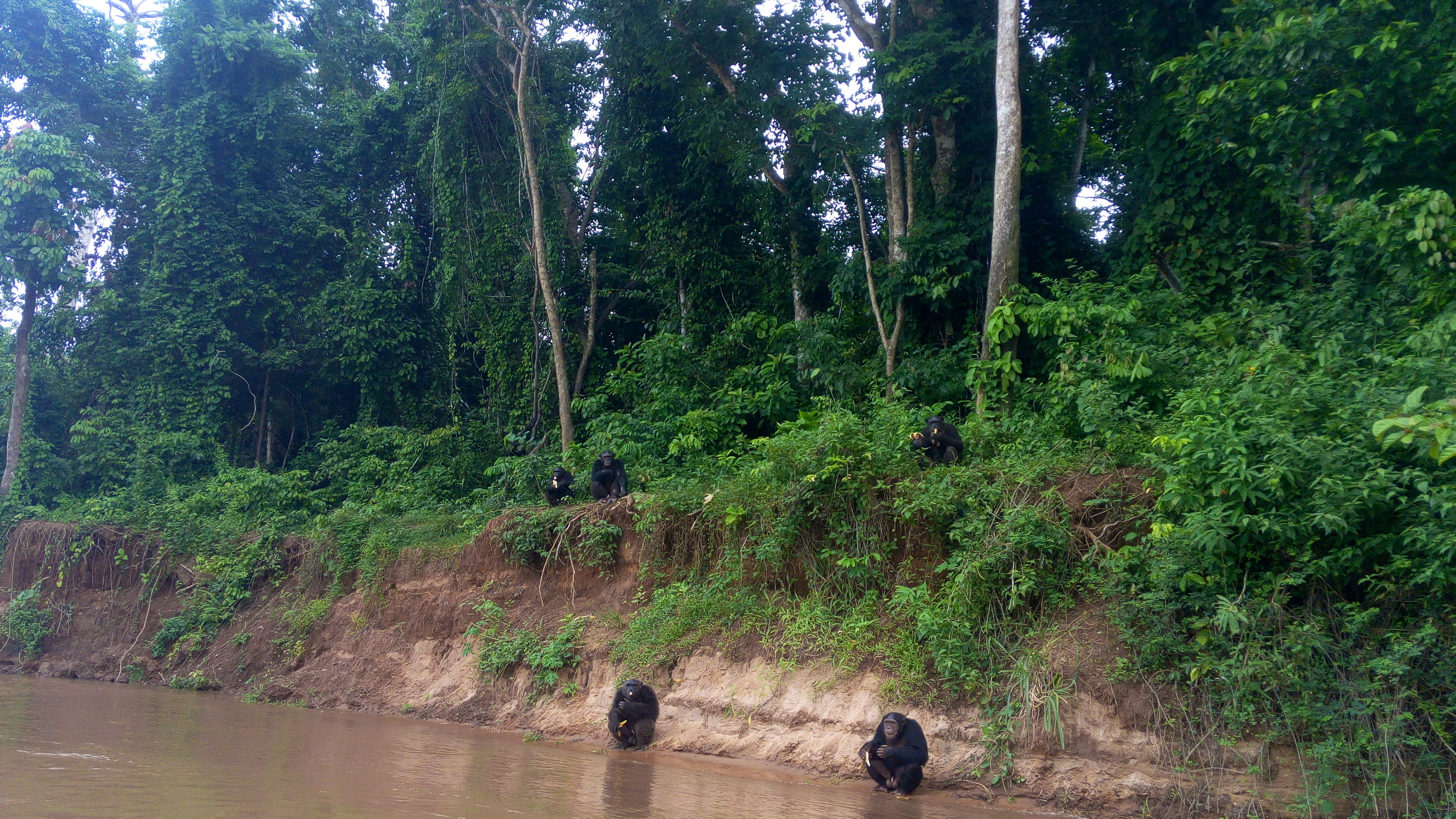
Chimpanzees

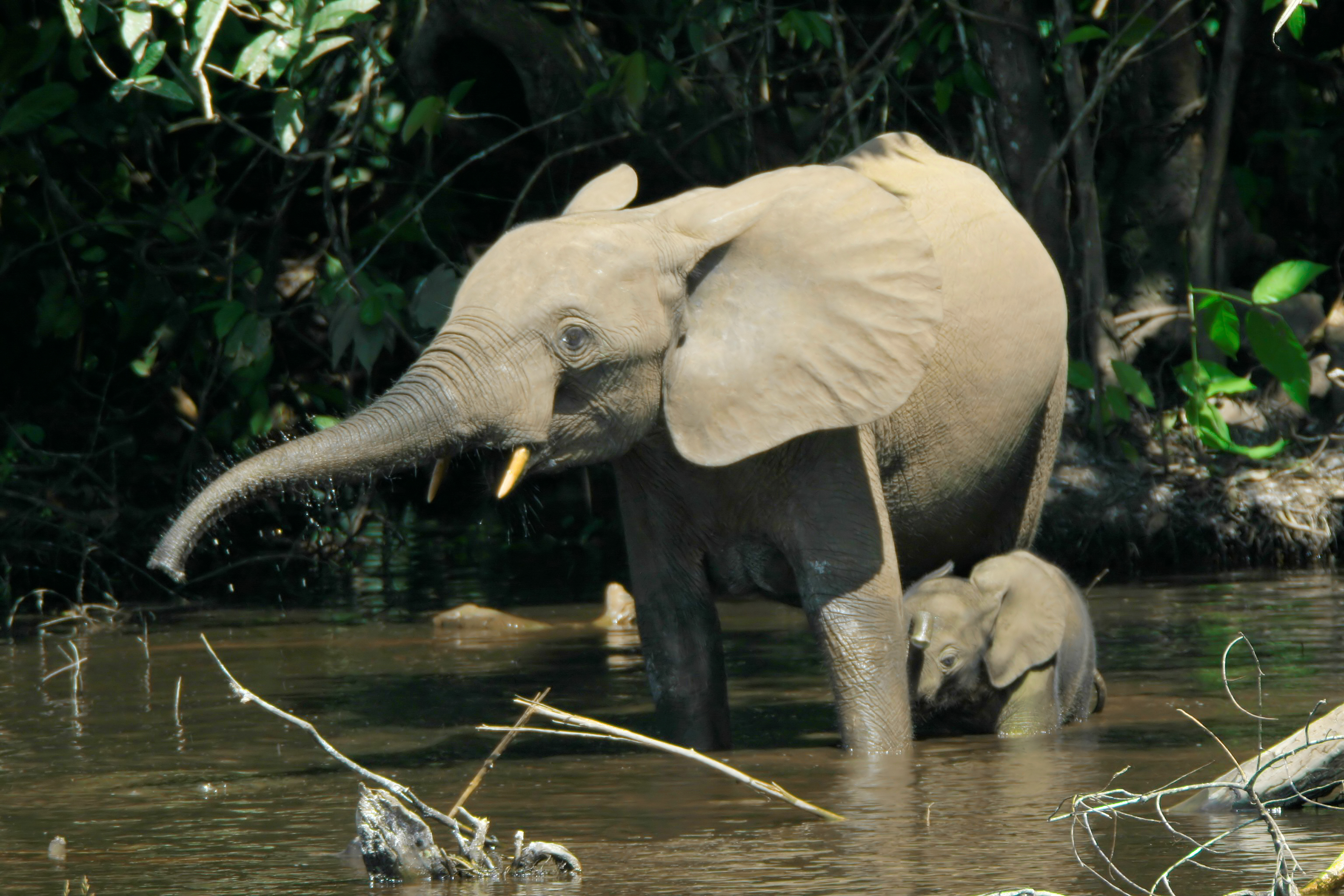
Adult and young elephants

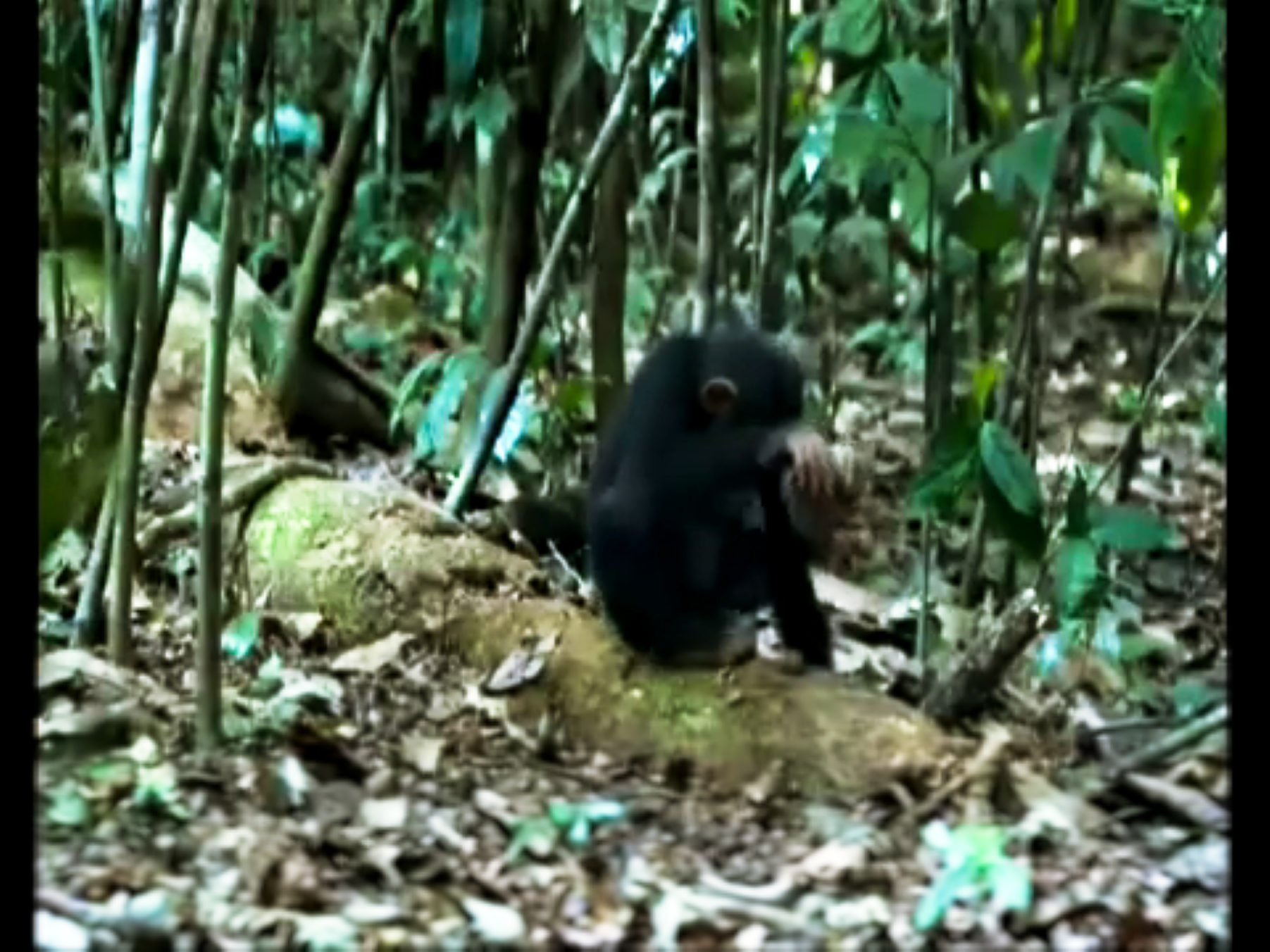
Chimpanzee
