= Dao (surname) =

Vietnamese surname

Dao is a surname in Canada, India, the Philippines, Hong Kong, mainland China, Singapore, the UK, Portugal, the US and Vietnam.

== Notable people ==
- Chloe Dao, Vietnamese-American fashion designer
- David Dao, passenger involved on United Express Flight 3411 incident
- Đào Duy Anh, Vietnamese historian
- Đào Duy Khánh, Vietnamese footballer
- Đào Duy Từ, Vietnamese poet
- Fanta Dao, Malian sprinter
- Issoumaïla Dao, Ivorian footballer
- Joseph Dao, Burkinabé bishop
- Julie C. Dao, Vietnamese-American author
- Khoi Dao, Vietnamese-American voice actor
- Lassina Dao, Ivorian footballer
- Macoura Dao, Ivorian politician
- Moussa Dao, Burkinabé footballer
- Đào Nhật Minh, Vietnamese footballer
- Outsana Dao, Laotian boxer
- Đào Thiên Hải, Vietnamese chess player
- Thomas Dao, Chinese-American physician
- Đào Văn Nam, Vietnamese footballer
- Đào Văn Phong, Vietnamese footballer
- Vince Dao, American political commentator
- Youssouf Dao, Ivorian footballer
- Dao Zheng, Taiwanese Buddhist nun
