= Cavayé Yéguié Djibril =

President of the National Assembly of Cameroon from 1992 to 2026

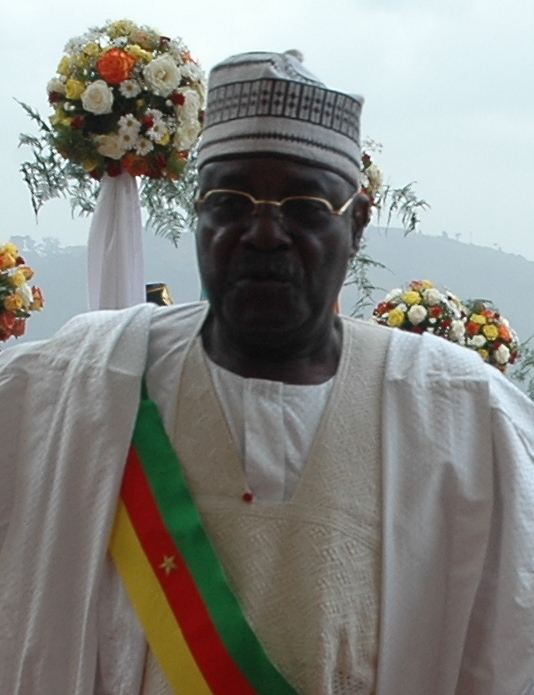
- Cavayé in 2012

4th President of the National Assembly of Cameroon
- In office 31 March 1992 – 17 March 2026
- Preceded by: Lawrence Fonka Shang
- Succeeded by: Théodore Datouo

Member of the National Assembly of Cameroon for Mayo-Sava
- In office 29 May 1983 – 6 May 2026
- Preceded by: Constituency established
- Succeeded by: TBD

Member of the National Assembly of East Cameroon
- In office 7 June 1970 – 2 June 1972

Personal details
- Born: 1 February 1940 Mada, French Cameroon
- Died: 6 May 2026 (aged 86) Mada, Cameroon
- Party: CPDM

Cavayé Yéguié Djibril (1 February 1940 – 6 May 2026) was a Cameroonian politician who was the fourth president of the National Assembly of Cameroon from 1992 to 2026. He was the longest-serving person to hold the position. A member of the Cameroon People's Democratic Movement (CPDM), he was the Member of the National Assembly for Mayo-Sava from 1983 until his death.

== Background and early political career ==
Born in Mada, located in the Tokombéré arrondissement of Mayo-Sava Department in the Far North Region, Cavayé was a member of the Mada ethnic group. He studied at the regional center for physical and sports education from 1960 to 1963 and subsequently worked as a teacher in Maroua. He was then appointed Interdepartmental Inspector of the Far North in 1965, and he entered the Legislative Assembly of East Cameroon in April 1970; he also became the traditional chief of the Mada in 1971. Following the creation of a unitary state, Cavayé was elected to the National Assembly of Cameroon in 1973 and obtained the position of Questor in the Bureau of the National Assembly. In 1975, he was included in the Central Committee of the Cameroon National Union (CNU) ruling party.

== Political career in the 1980s and 1990s ==
After ten years in the National Assembly, Cavayé was elected as its Second Vice-President in 1983. In 1985, when President Paul Biya transformed the CNU into the CPDM, Cavayé was retained as a member of the CPDM Central Committee. He served as Second Vice-President of the National Assembly for five years, departing the legislature at the end of the parliamentary term in 1988 and instead becoming Prefectoral Assistant of Diamaré. He returned to the National Assembly in the March 1992 parliamentary election and was then elected as President of the National Assembly.

Cavayé was re-elected to the National Assembly in the May 1997 parliamentary election and was then re-elected for a second term as President of the National Assembly in mid-1997. After Paul Biya was re-elected in the October 1997 presidential election amidst an opposition boycott, Cavayé said at the opening of a parliamentary session on 1 November 1997 that deputies should "respect the institutions of the Republic" and "be worthy representatives of the sovereign people", but the opposition deputies ignored his admonition and boycotted Biya's swearing-in ceremony on 3 November.

== Political career from 2000 ==
At the opening of a parliamentary session on 8 November 2001, Cavayé strongly criticized secessionist tendencies among the Anglophone population, saying that secessionism threatened national stability and that the National Assembly would not tolerate it. Following the 2002 parliamentary election, the CPDM Political Bureau again selected Cavayé as the party's candidate for the post of President of the National Assembly, with Mary Muyali Meboka as his deputy. He was then re-elected in August 2002; there were no other candidates for the position, and Cavayé received 132 votes in favor and 27 against, while four deputies abstained from the vote. In November 2005, he urged deputies to take an active role in the fight against corruption.

Explaining his decision to run again in the July 2007 parliamentary election, Cavayé said that he was passionate about his parliamentary duties and that he wanted to "help President Paul Biya honour his electoral pledge of major changes to the Cameroonian people during the 2004 presidential polls". Cavayé was again re-elected to the National Assembly as a CPDM candidate in the Mayo-Sava Constituency of Far North Province.

Following the 2007 election, CPDM Parliamentary Group President Jean-Bernard Ndongo Essomba presented Cavayé as the party's candidate for another term as President of the National Assembly on 31 August 2007; the vote was considered a mere formality, as Cavayé was President Biya's choice for the position. However, another CPDM Deputy, Adama Modi, caused a stir by presenting himself as a candidate for the position, in opposition to Cavayé. Party leaders asked Modi not to do so, but he insisted that he was within his rights and that he did not care about the consequences; ultimately he exited the chamber, refusing to participate in the vote. Cavayé sat quietly during the heated episode and did not react. As the only candidate, he was easily re-elected; he received 130 votes, with 143 deputies participating. After taking his seat as President of the National Assembly, Cavayé said that he would enforce an atmosphere of discipline in the chamber. Modi's challenge to Cavayé was considered a remarkable and severe act of indiscipline, and a CPDM disciplinary committee was subsequently formed to review Modi's conduct.

In the years following his re-election in 2007, Cavayé successively dismissed four secretaries-general of the National Assembly. In a routine vote, he was re-elected as President of the National Assembly on 4 March 2010. He was the only candidate and received 141 votes, while 16 deputies spoiled their votes.

As the traditional chief (Lamido) of Mada, Cavayé attended the National Forum of Traditional Rulers of Cameroon in March 2010. He was designated as Honorary President of the Forum and presided over its opening and closing ceremonies. At the Forum, which resulted in the creation of the National Council of Traditional Rulers of Cameroon, Cavayé discussed the venerable and enduring role of traditional chiefs and stressed that they worked cooperatively with the state administration, recognizing the authority of the state's laws. Cavayé said that the National Council was not a political organization and should never act as a parallel authority alongside the state; instead, he defined the Council as an institution dedicated to cooperation, promoting traditional culture, and assisting the state administration in its work for the benefit of the population. The Council subsequently issued a statement calling on President Biya to stand for re-election in the 2011 presidential election and vowing to support Biya's work in developing the country.

In the September 2013 parliamentary election, Cavayé was re-elected to the National Assembly. When the National Assembly began meeting for its new parliamentary term, he was re-elected as President of the National Assembly on 4 November 2013. Cavayé received the votes of 150 deputies, while 23 deputies cast invalid votes. In 2024, he was re-elected president of the National Assembly for the 32nd time successively. He stood down from the position in 2026 and was replaced by Théodore Datouo.

Cavayé was a member of the CPDM Political Bureau.

== Personal life and death ==
Cavayé had four wives and 15 children. He died on 6 May 2026 in Mada, where he had retired after being replaced as speaker of the National Assembly 50 days before. He was 86.
