= Monique Ouli Ndongo =

Cameroonian politician (born 1958)

Member of the Constitutional Council in Cameroon
- Incumbent
- Assumed office 8 April 2025

Member of the Senate of Cameroon for East Region
- In office 14 May 2013 – 11 April 2023

Personal details
- Born: 1958 (age 67–68)
- Party: Cameroon People's Democratic Movement
- Education: University of Dschang

Monique Ouli Ndongo (born 1958) is a Cameroonian politician, member of the Cameroon People's Democratic Movement (CPDM). During two legislatures, she was elected senator for the East region of Cameroon. She was appointed member of the Constitutional Council of Cameroon in April 2025 by the President of Cameroon.

== Biography ==
=== Education and early career ===
She is from the Kadey department in the East. A graduate of the Faculty of Agronomy and Agricultural Sciences (FASA) of the University of Dschang in 1985, she is an Agricultural Works Engineer. She began her career at the Ministry of Livestock, Fisheries and Animal Industries (MINEPIA). An administrative executive, she held the position of Secretary General of this ministerial department from 2006 to 2015.

=== Political career ===
A full member elected to the central committee of the CPDM in 2011, she is one of the women who work for the political emancipation of women in Cameroon and particularly in the East. In 2013, she was included in the list of CPDM candidates for the 2013 Cameroonian senatorial election and was elected full Senator for the East Cameroon. In 2018, she returned to the electoral race and retained her senatorial functions during the second legislature.

On Tuesday, 5 July 2022, during the installation of the Executive Bureau of the Cameroon Parliamentary Alliance for Food and Nutrition Security (APCASAN), she was appointed Deputy General Rapporteur. She was also part of the Diaspora-Decentralized Cooperation Parliamentarians Network (REP-COD) which aims to provide solutions to municipalities in various areas related to decentralized, cross-border cooperation and inter-municipal cooperation. The same year, she joined forces with another senator from the East, Jean Mboubjo, to help facilitate the collection of municipal revenues in the Kadey department. Together, they offered the seven municipalities of this department seven motorcycles and financial envelopes intended to accelerate the establishment of birth certificates through the organization of mobile hearings.

In the 2023 Cameroonian senatorial election, her senatorial career came to an end leaving room for new political figures in the Eastern region. On 8 April 2025, she was appointed member of the Constitutional Council of Cameroon by President of Cameroon Paul Biya.

== See also ==
- List of Cameroonian women senators
- Senators of the 1st legislature of Cameroon
- Senators of the 2nd legislature of Cameroon
- 2013 Cameroonian senatorial election
- 2018 Cameroonian senatorial election
