= Delphine Medjo =

Cameroonian politician (1941–2016)

The Senate
- In office 14 April 2013 – 22 September 2016

Personal details
- Born: 9 March 1941 Douala, Cameroon
- Died: 22 September 2016 (aged 75) Yaoundé University Hospital, Yaoundé, Cameroon
- Party: Cameroon People's Democratic Movement (from 1985)
- Other political affiliations: Cameroonian Union (1962–1966)
- Children: 7
- Education: Nkongsamba Teacher Training College
- Awards: Order of Merit; Order of Valor x3

Delphine Medjo (9 March 1941 – 22 September 2016) was a Cameroonian politician and educator. A member of the Cameroon People's Democratic Movement, she was elected to the Senate in 2013.

== Early life ==
Medjo was born on 9 March 1941 in Douala, Cameroon, to Mvelle Martin and Louisa Douala. She had two brothers and a sister. She studied at Nkongsamba Teacher Training College.

== Career ==
Medjo entered politics in 1962 with the Cameroonian Union. She met the Prime Minister of East Cameroon, Charles Assalé, while teaching at New-Bell Bassa public school, which helped her political career. Assalé offered Medjo a job in Ebolowa in Adoum public school.

In 1969, she was elected the head of the Cameroon National Union Women's Organization, which included Ntem and Mvila. In 1985, Medjo joined the Cameroon People's Democratic Movement and became municipal councilor of Ebolowa. She also founded the Association of Women Responsible for the Cameroon People's Democratic Movement. In 1988, she joined the Central Committee of the party. On 14 April 2013, she was elected senator in Cameroon's first senatorial election.

== Personal life and death ==
Medjo had 7 children. She died on 22 September 2016 at the age of 75 in Yaoundé University Hospital.

== Awards ==
Medjo received several awards, including:

- Knight and Officer of the Cameroonian National Order of Merit Grand Cordon of the Cameroonian National Order of Merit (posthumous)
- Knight and Officer of the National Order of Valor
- Commander of the National Order of Valor
- Grand Dignity of the National Order of Valor
