= Ndongo (surname) =

Ndongo is a surname of African origin; specifically Cameroon and Equatorial Guinea,

== List of people with the surname ==
- Atanasio Ndongo Miyone, Equatoguinean musician, writer and political figure
- Bertrand Ndongo (born 1990), Cameroonian activist in Spain
- Cyrille Ndongo-Keller (born 1974), Cameroonian football coach and former football player
- Donato Ndongo-Bidyogo (born 1950), Equatoguinean journalist and writer
- Franck Ndongo (born 1988), Cameroonian basketball player
- Jacques Fame Ndongo (born 1950), Cameroonian politician
- Martin Ndongo-Ebanga (born 1966), Cameroonian retired boxer
- Monique Ouli Ndongo (born 1958), Cameroonian politician
- Ndongo Serge Philippe (born 1994), Cameroonian footballer
- Vicenta Ndongo (born 1968), Spanish actress of Equatoguinean descent
- Vicente Ndongo (born 1992), Equatoguinean retired futsal player
- Robson Ndongo (born 1995), Artist
- Gerson Ndongo (born 1995), Artist

== See also ==
- Kingdom of Ndongo
