= Françoise Foning =

Cameroonian politician (1949–2015)

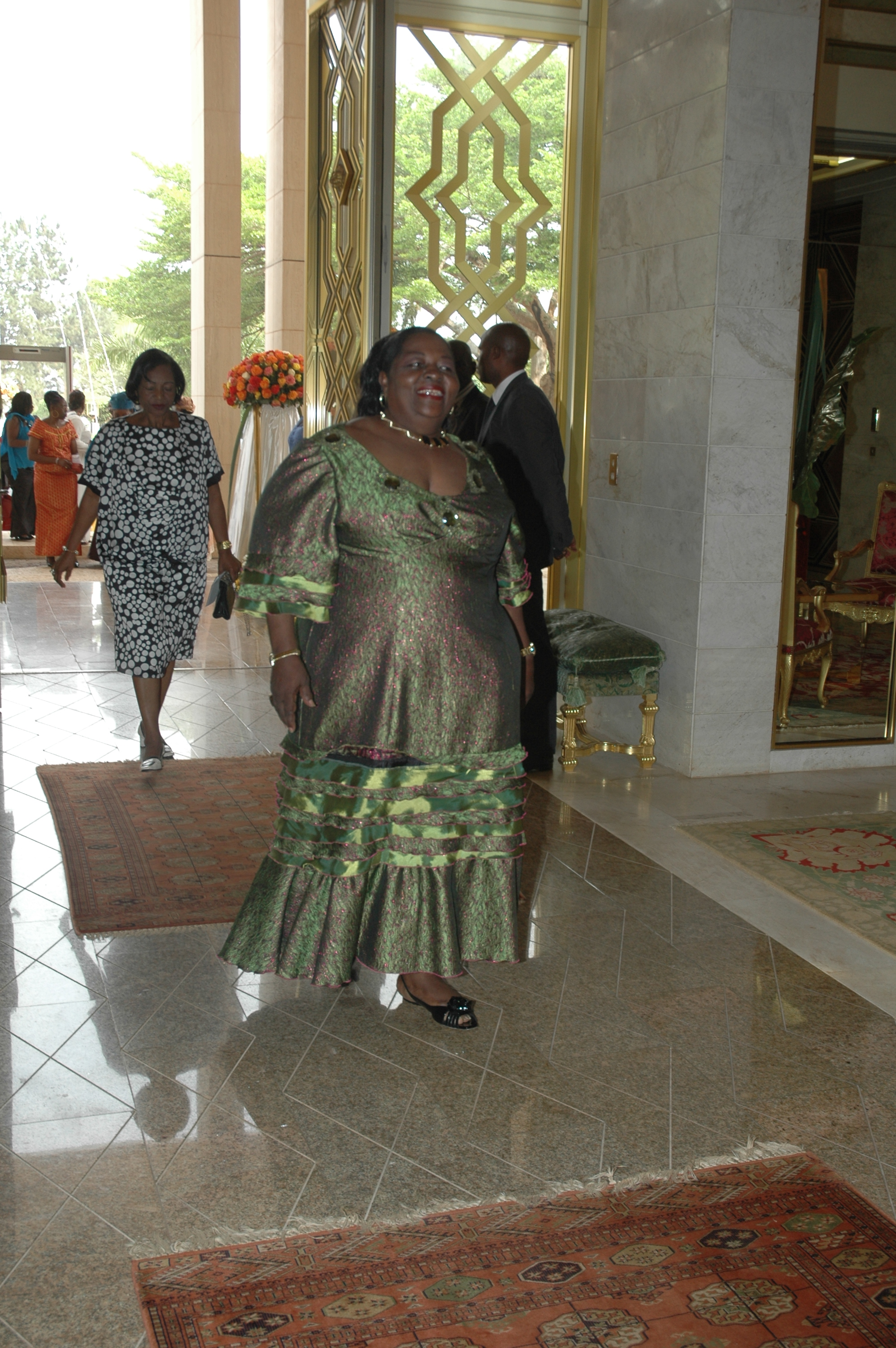

Mayor of Douala V
- In office 2002–2015
- Monarch: Paul Biya
- Prime Minister: Peter Mafany Musonge (2002–2004); Ephraïm Inoni (2004–2009); Philémon Yang (2009–2015)

National Assembly member
- In office 2002–2007
- In office 2009–2015

Personal details
- Born: 1949 Menoua, Cameroon
- Died: January 23, 2015 (aged 65–66) Yaoundé, Cameroon
- Cause of death: Automobile accident
- Party: Cameroon People's Democratic Movement
- Children: 6
- Profession: Businessperson

Françoise Foning (1949 – 23 January 2015) was a Cameroonian businessperson and politician for the Cameroon People's Democratic Movement (CPDM). She began a career in business at age 12, opening a restaurant before entering into the tourism, transportation, food, medical and education sectors. Foning became president of CPDM's women's division in 1992 and was appointed the party's leader in Douala and the national committee five years later. In 2002, she was elected deputy mayor of Douala II and began serving in the National Assembly that same year. Foning led the African Network and Cameroonian Businesswomen and consulted The World Bank, the African Development Bank along with several international agencies. She was founding president of the Association of Cameroonian Businesswomen and the NGO World Female Company Managers. A street in Douala was named in her memory.

== Biography ==
Foning was born in 1949 to a modest Bamileke family in Cameroon's western region of Menoua. She did not have a proper background, and did not enroll at university but learnt English and French. After encouragement from her family to work, she went into tourism at age 12 in Douala, the Southern Cameroonian port city. In 1966, Foning began a business career by establishing the restaurant New Style to earn extra money. She diversified into the transportation industry by purchasing 2 taxis from the Japanese car manufacturer Toyota, expanding to 150 by 2005. Foning added the gravel company Les Graviers Unis, and the Socamac food and Ovicam export-import companies and the Anflo furniture company to export to Europe and the United States.

She joined the Cameroonian Ministry of Tourism as a civil servant in the 1970s before deciding to focus on her business career. Foning brought a medical clinic in Dschang and established the school Collége de la Faternité in the city. This led the government of Cameroon and the local authorities of Foning's home region to award her with honours for her activities. The kingdom of Bamun granted her the title of Nijh and Menoua's Bafou community crowned her as its queen. Foning also received the Grand Officer Order of Merit. At Douala in 1992, she was appointed president of the women's wing of the Cameroon People's Democratic Movement (CPDM). Foning became president of the CPDM in Douala and its national central committee in 1997, following a 1996 reform by the political party to allow women to lead sections of the party. She was close to Chantal Biya, the wife of Paul Biya, the president of Cameroon, and the two worked at the Foundation Chantal Biya.

In 2002, Foning was elected the deputy mayor of Douala II, and began serving in the National Assembly that year. She focused on helping the young, building power lines, health centres, roads, schools, eliminating illness and organising funeral services. In June 2003, she was involved in the signing of a "partnership convention" to train Douala's "bendskin drivers" at professional driving schools. Foning was involved in a car accident a month later. which fractured both her legs on the Douala-Bafoussam road in Nomayos I in Cameroon's Centre region, and caused her to be flown to France for medical attention on the orders of Paul Biya. The accident meant she walked with a limp. She was named African manager of the year in 2004. In 2005, Foning was elected president of the World Association of Women Entrepreneurs, having been its vice-president since 1996. Later that year in October, she became the first black woman president of the NGO World Female Company Managers (WFCL).

Foning lost her seat in the 2007 Cameroonian parliamentary election by securing 41 per cent of the vote over the winning candidate's who garnered 48 per cent of votes. Although she was accused of embezzling money from the municipal government, she was re-elected to the National Assembly in 2009. Foning left her role as president of the WFCL in 2012. She was the Association of Cameroonian Businesswomen's founding president, led the African Network for the Support for Female Entrepreneurship and consulted The World Bank, the African Development Bank and several international agencies. Foning took part in several international conferences and meetings, including the USA/Africa summit in Washington, D.C. She was also international vice-president of the Francophone Business Forum, permanent secretary Africa of the AGOA training centre (African Growth Opportunity Act), and was president of the Chamber of Commerce's Industry Department.

== Personal life and death ==
Foning praised the Cameroonian presidential couple at official ceremonies and her fellow citizens called her "national leader" as a result. She had been married three times, and had six children. On 18 January 2015, Foning attended a meeting of the 4th assembly of the United Cities and Councils of Cameroon in the Cameroonian capital of Yaoundé. After leaving the meeting, the driver of her car carrying her and her bodyguard lost control on the Yaoundé Bafoussam road in Ebebda after attempting to avoid a motorcycle passing a lorry holding sand in the opposite direction at high speed, causing the car to roll several times. Foning broke her legs and ribs, and was immediately transported to the emergency unit at Central Hospital of Yaoundé. Foning died from a sudden spike of blood pressure and hypertension on the morning of 23 January, with the news made public by hospital officials about midday.

== Funeral ==
On 18 March, Paul Biya signed a decree instituting the official funeral service for Foning to be held five days later. A vigil and masses were held in her honor before the funeral. Work on the burial site by companies in Douala was completed on 20 March. The brief ecumenical service was held in the palace of Johny Baleng in Menoua with members of her family and government officials in attendance on 21 March. Foning was interred at the family home afterwards.

== Legacy ==
She was posthumously conferred the Grand Condor of the Order of Merit by Philémon Yang, the Prime Minister, and the foundation of the Francoise Foning Foundation to help retain the memory of her work in the public was announced by her son. Foning was replaced as president of Association of Cameroonian Businesswomen by Agnès Ntube Ndode, and the contest to take her place as mayor of Douala 5 ended with Carlos Ngoualem winning the election on 5 August. At the request of her family, a 3.5 km (2.2 mi) street in the Douala 5 district linking the Akwa-Nord Pharmacy to the Makepe Roundabout bearing the name Rue Françoise Foning was renamed from No 5.508 to honour her in late 2016. An accompanying plaque was installed at both ends of the street and a monograph on the life and works of Foning was published in 2017.
