= Jean-Bernard Ndongo Essomba =

Cameroonian politician (died 2023)

President of the Parliamentary Group of the Cameroon People's Democratic Movement (RDPC) in the National Assembly of Cameroon
- In office 2002 – 17 March 2023

Jean-Bernard Ndongo Essomba (died 17 March 2023) was a Cameroonian business man and politician. He was president of the Parliamentary Group of the Cameroon People's Democratic Movement (RDPC) in the National Assembly of Cameroon from 1992 to 1997, and he has held that post again since 2002.

== Political career before 2007 ==
Ndongo Essomba, a businessman, was the third vice-president of the Chamber of Commerce, Industry, and Mines (Chambre de commerce, d'industrie et des mines, CCIM) as of 1984. He was appointed to the Central Committee of the Cameroon National Union (UNC) by President Paul Biya (acting in his capacity as president of the UNC) in May 1984. When the UNC was transformed into the RDPC at the March 1985 party congress in Bamenda, Ndongo Essomba was retained as one of the 65 full members of the RDPC Central Committee; he was also designated as Second Deputy Secretary for Trade Unions.

Local elections were held in October 1987; they were notable for the fact that multiple RDPC lists were allowed to run in the same constituencies, thus providing a measure of political competition within the context of the single-party system. Ndongo Essomba headed a list in the rural commune of Sa'a, located in the Centre Province.

In the March 1992 parliamentary election, he was elected to the National Assembly as an RDPC candidate in the Lekié constituency of Centre Province; following that election, he was president of the RDPC Parliamentary Group from 1992 to 1997. He sought to be nominated again as an RDPC candidate in Lekié for the 1997 parliamentary election, but he was defeated in an RDPC party primary by a list headed by Antoine-Louis Ntsimi.

Prior to the June 2002 parliamentary election, Ndongo Essomba again participated in the RDPC party primary in Lekié. In the primary, held on 9–10 May 2002, the list headed by Ndongo Essomba narrowly defeated the list led by Ntsimi; it received 2,587 votes against 2,505 for Ntsimi's list. After winning a seat in the National Assembly, Ndongo Essomba was elected as president of the RDPC Parliamentary Group when the National Assembly began meeting for its new term in August 2002.

== 2007 election and subsequent events ==
In the July 2007 parliamentary election, Ndongo Essomba was re-elected to the National Assembly as an RDPC candidate in Lekié East constituency. He was retained in his post as president of the RDPC Parliamentary Group when the National Assembly began meeting for the new parliamentary term.

In April 2008, when the National Assembly approved changes to the constitution that eliminated term limits on the presidency, thereby allowing President Biya to run for re-election in 2011, Ndongo Essomba said that the changes deserved "the enthusiastic support of all Cameroonians of good faith". He argued that they would "enhance democracy, maintain political stability, national unity and territorial integrity" and that they were "in tune with international accepted standards as practised in old democracies such as France and the United Kingdom". The constitutional changes were furiously denounced by the opposition.

In the September 2013 parliamentary election, Ndongo Essomba was re-elected to the National Assembly.

Ndongo Essomba was a member of the RDPC Political Bureau.
