= Cameroonian Party of Democrats =

Political party in Cameroon

Cameroonian Party of Democrats Parti des Démocrates Camerounais
- Abbreviation: PCD (French); CPD (English)
- President: Simon Pierre Omgba Mbida
- Secretary-General: Claude Abé
- Founder: André-Marie Mbida
- Founded: 12 January 1958; 68 years ago
- Headquarters: Yaoundé, Cameroon
- Ideology: Liberal democracy
- Colors: Yellow; Green
- Slogan: God - Fatherland - Justice - Equality (French: Dieu - Patrie - Justice - Égalité)
- Senate: 0 / 100
- National Assembly: 0 / 180

The Cameroonian Party of Democrats (French: Parti des Démocrates Camerounais, PDC or CPD) is a political party in Cameroon. Founded in 1958 by André-Marie Mbida, Cameroon's first prime minister, the party was initially associated with the country's early parliamentary politics and drew much of its support from the Ewondo, Bulu, and Eton communities.

After ceasing to operate in the mid-1960s, the PDC was re-established following the restoration of multiparty politics in Cameroon in the early 1990s. It contested the 1992 and 1997 parliamentary elections but failed to win a seat in either election.

After a prolonged period of limited political activity, the PDC began a process of revitalization in 2026. In June 2026, the party held a national congress in Yaoundé, at which Simon Pierre Omgba Mbida was elected president-general, succeeding Louis-Tobie Mbida. The congress adopted a series of resolutions aimed at reorganizing the party and preparing it for participation in future elections.

== History ==
The PDC initially emerged as a loose alliance of candidates that contested the 1956 Territorial Assembly election. It received 20.9% of the vote and won 20 of the assembly's 70 seats.

The party was formally established in 1958 under the leadership of André-Marie Mbida. It drew much of its support from the Ewondo, Bulu, and Eton communities. In the 1960 parliamentary election, the PDC received 10.4% of the vote and won 12 of the 100 seats. In the 1964 parliamentary election, it received 6.4% of the vote in West Cameroon but failed to win a seat. The party subsequently ceased to operate in the mid-1960s.

Following the restoration of multiparty politics, the PDC was re-established in the early 1990s, with Louis-Tobie Mbida becoming its leader. The party contested the 1992 parliamentary election, receiving 1.8% of the vote and winning no seats. In the 1997 elections, its vote share fell to 0.1%, and it again failed to win a seat.

After years of limited activity, the PDC began a process of organizational revival in early 2026. In January, Louis-Tobie Mbida established an ad hoc committee to restructure the party and prepare for legislative and municipal elections. Claude Abé was appointed to coordinate the committee, working with Simon Pierre Omgba Mbida, who served as the president's representative and supervisor of the initiative.

On 13 June 2026, the PDC held an ordinary national congress in Yaoundé focused on renewing its leadership and preparing for future elections. Simon Pierre Omgba Mbida was elected president-general, succeeding Louis-Tobie Mbida, while Claude Abé became secretary-general. The congress adopted 22 resolutions concerning the party's reorganization and political strategy.

The renewed PDC leadership has announced its intention to participate in the legislative and municipal elections scheduled for 2027.

== Election results ==
=== National Assembly elections ===
Election	Leader	Votes	%	Seats	+/–	Position	Status
1956	André-Marie Mbida	152,000	20.91	20 / 69	New	2nd	Governing majority (1957–1958)
1956	André-Marie Mbida	152,000	20.91	20 / 69	New	2nd	Opposition (1958–1960)
1960	André-Marie Mbida	139,780	10.36	12 / 100	▼8	▼4th	Opposition
1964	André-Marie Mbida	60,485	2.69	0 / 100	▼12	▼3rd	Opposition
1992	Louis-Tobie Mbida	37,131	1.74	0 / 180	0	5th	Extra-parliamentary
1997	Louis-Tobie Mbida	3,460	0.12	0 / 180	0	▼10th	Extra-parliamentary
2002	Louis-Tobie Mbida	Did not participate		0 / 180	—	—	Extra-parliamentary
2007	Louis-Tobie Mbida	Did not participate		0 / 180	—	—	Opposition
2013	Louis-Tobie Mbida	Did not participate		0 / 180	—	—	Extra-parliamentary
2020	Louis-Tobie Mbida	Did not participate		0 / 180	—	—	Extra-parliamentary
