= Parfait Martial Eloundou‑Enyegue =

Cameroonian demographer and sociologist

- Born: Cameroon
- Education: University of Dschang (Ingénieur agroéconomiste, 1985); Pennsylvania State University (M.S., 1988; PhD, 1997)
- Known for: Demographic dividend, population dynamics, inequality research
- Awards: Dorothy S. Thomas Award (1994); Innovative Teacher Award (2006); Marilyn Emmons Williams Award (2008); Distinguished Alumni Award (2020)
- Scientific career
- Fields: Demography, Sociology
- Institutions: Cornell University; RAND Corporation
- Thesis: Demographic Responses to Economic Crisis in Cameroon: Fertility, Child Schooling and the Quantity/quality Tradeoff (1997)

Parfait Martial Eloundou‑Enyegue is a demographer and sociologist whose research examines how population dynamics intersect with education, inequality and sustainable development. He is section head of Global Development at Cornell University, where he holds joint appointments in Global Development and the Jeb E. Brooks School of Public Policy. Eloundou‑Enyegue has taught and carried out fieldwork in Africa, North America and Asia, and he has used decomposition methods to study large‑scale social change. In 2016, he was appointed to the United Nations Independent Group of Scientists that prepared the Global Sustainable Development Report 2019. He is a member of the United Nations High‑Level Advisory Board on Economic and Social Affairs (2025–2027) and joined the Population Council's Board of Trustees in 2024.

== Early life and education ==
Eloundou‑Enyegue was born and raised in Cameroon. He studied agricultural economics and rural sociology at the University of Dschang, earning an Ingénieur agroéconomiste degree in 1985. He later moved to the United States for graduate studies in demography at Pennsylvania State University, where he completed a M.S. in 1988 and a Ph.D. in 1997. In a 2023 interview, he discussed early experiences related to inequality.

== Academic career ==
After completing his doctorate, Eloundou‑Enyegue worked at the RAND Corporation in Los Angeles before joining Cornell University's Department of Development Sociology (now Global Development) in July 2000. He was appointed chair of the department in 2016 and later returned to lead the Global Development section after its reorganisation. He also served as interim director of the Institute for African Studies and is associate director of the Cornell Population Center. Outside Cornell, he has held visiting appointments at Korea University’s summer programme (2007–2019), is chair of INED's Evaluation Committee, and has taught short courses in Africa, Asia and Europe.

From 2008 to 2017, he directed a network supported by the Hewlett Foundation and the International Union for the Scientific Study of Population (IUSSP) that offered training, fellowships and research opportunities to Francophone demographers. He has served on the boards of the Population Association of America (PAA), Population Reference Bureau (PRB), Guttmacher Institute and IUSSP, and has been a consultant for the United Nations, the World Bank and USAID. During a sabbatical, he was a senior fellow at PRB, where he worked on population and development policy.

== Research ==
Eloundou‑Enyegue’s research focuses on how demographic change shapes social structures and development outcomes. Work on the demographic dividend examines the economic implications of declining fertility and a growing working‑age population, particularly in relation to inequality, education, youth employment, health, food security and conflict. Earlier studies explored links between fertility patterns and schooling, including "Demographic Transitions and Children's Resources" (2007) and "Pregnancy‑Related Dropouts and Gender Inequality in Education" (2004).

In later work, his research turned to broader questions of sustainable development. He has used decomposition methods to examine patterns of social change. With collaborators Sarah Giroux and Michel Tenikue, he has studied historical shifts in global inequality. This research examines links between demographic factors and progress toward SDG targets, the possible benefits of fertility transitions in Africa, and associated risks such as widening inequality, an "uneven demographic dividend," and social tension. By 2100, more than half of the world’s children are projected to be in Africa. In the 2019 GSDR, he and colleagues at IGS emphasised the need for evidence‑based policy and noted that improving the quality of science is important for understanding how SDGs interact.

=== Population projections and policy model ===
In 2024, the Cornell Chronicle reported a project led by Eloundou‑Enyegue and student collaborators at the Cornell Population Center to develop a comparative data model for assessing countries undergoing similar demographic transitions. The report described analysis of how declining birth rates and large youth cohorts relate to employment, inequality and other socioeconomic outcomes.

== Publications and editorships ==
Eloundou‑Enyegue has written on demographic transitions, inequality and education in journal articles and book chapters. He co‑edited Population and Development in the 21st Century: Between the Anthropocene and Anthropocentrism (2024). He contributed a chapter on the political economy of youth to the Oxford Handbook of the Economy of Cameroon. He is also a coordinating lead author for the United Nations Environment Programme's Global Environment Outlook 7.

== PICHNET and youth development ==
In 2016, Eloundou‑Enyegue co‑founded PICHNET, a nonprofit organisation in Cameroon. The name is derived from a Cameroonian French term meaning "a clever and helpful trick." According to the organisation, it focuses on youth mentoring as well as research, capacity development and policy communication. The initiative was created in response to demographic trends in Africa, particularly the growing youth population. Initial funding was provided by the U.S. Department of Defense, which supported a randomised trial with 5,000 high‑school graduates to test interventions such as mentoring, site visits, training programmes and internships. The trial’s curriculum included professional skills, personal planning, household responsibilities and community service.

Every year since 2016, PICHNET has organised a two‑month summer programme in Cameroon for recent high‑school graduates. The programme covers topics such as personal planning, financial literacy and goal‑setting, and has involved more than 2,000 participants. In interviews, Eloundou‑Enyegue has observed that unemployment can limit young people's social recognition as adults and argued that insufficient investment in youth transitions may contribute to insecurity and the loss of development opportunities.

== Global policy and advisory roles ==
=== Independent Group of Scientists and High‑Level Advisory Board ===
In 2017, Eloundou‑Enyegue was appointed by the United Nations to an independent group of 15 scientists responsible for preparing the Global Sustainable Development Report 2019. The report, titled The Future is Now, reviewed evidence across disciplines and proposed approaches for meeting the Sustainable Development Goals. His contribution focused on demographic change and human capital formation.

In 2024, he became a member of the Population Council's Board of Trustees, advising on research and policy related to population dynamics, social change and inequality. In 2025, the United Nations Department of Economic and Social Affairs appointed him to the High‑Level Advisory Board on Economic and Social Affairs (HLAB) for the 2025–2027 term. In this role, he takes part in international discussions on economic and social issues.

== Awards and honours ==
In 1994 he received the Dorothy S. Thomas Award from the Population Association of America for graduate research. At Cornell University he received the Innovative Teacher Award in 2006 and the Marilyn Emmons Williams Award for Undergraduate Research Advising in 2008. In 2020 he received the Distinguished Alumni Award from Penn State's College of Agricultural Sciences. Cornell's College of Agriculture and Life Sciences recognised his public engagement with the Outstanding Accomplishments in Science and Policy Award in 2018. He chairs France's Institut national d'études démographiques (INED) Evaluation Committee and has served as an external reviewer for Canada's Social Sciences and Humanities Research Council.
