= Dakolé Daïssala =

Cameroonian politician (1943–2022)

Senator of Cameroon for the Far North Region
- In office 10 May 2013 – 9 August 2022
- Appointed by: Paul Biya

Minister of Transport
- In office 8 December 2004 – 7 September 2007
- Prime Minister: Ephraïm Inoni
- Preceded by: Charles Salé
- Succeeded by: Gounoko Haounaye

Member of the National Assembly for Mayo-Kani
- In office 1997–2002

Minister of State for Posts and Telecommunications
- In office 9 April 1992 – 7 December 1997
- Prime Minister: Simon Achidi Achu; Peter Mafany Musonge
- Preceded by: Sanda Oumarou
- Succeeded by: Mounchipou Seidou

President of the Movement for the Defence of the Republic
- In office 1991 – 9 August 2022
- Preceded by: Party established
- Succeeded by: Paulin Djorwé

Personal details
- Born: 15 April 1943 Kaélé, French Cameroon
- Died: 9 August 2022 (aged 79) Yaoundé, Cameroon
- Party: MDR

Dakole Daïssala (15 April 1943 – 9 August 2022) was a Cameroonian politician and the President of the Movement for the Defence of the Republic (MDR), a political party based in Cameroon's Far North Region. He served in the government of Cameroon as Minister of State for Posts and Telecommunications from 1992 to 1997; subsequently he was a Deputy in the National Assembly from 1997 to 2002 and then Minister of Transport from 2004 to 2007. He served in the Senate from 2013 until his death.

== Political career ==
Daïssala was a Kirdi and was born in Goundye (Kaélé) in the Far North Province, on 15 April 1943. In 1967, he became first deputy prefect in Ngaoundéré; subsequently, he was Deputy Director of General Administration at the Ministry of Finance from 1969 to 1970 and Director of Transport from 1970 to 1973. He served as Deputy Director-General of the Cameroon Urban Transport Authority (Société de Transports Urbains du Cameroun, SOTUC) from 1973 to 1975, and then as Director-General of SOTUC from 1975 until 1984.

Daïssala was arrested following the failed April 1984 coup attempt against President Paul Biya. After spending seven years in prison without ever being tried or even charged, he was released in 1991. He wrote a book about his experience in prison called Libre derrière les barreaux (Free Behind Bars).

Once released, he founded the Movement for the Defence of the Republic (MDR), an opposition party; some have suspected that the party was actually created by the authorities as part of a strategy of diluting meaningful opposition. The MDR won six seats in the National Assembly in the March 1992 parliamentary election (all of them in the Far North Province) and afterwards it allied with the ruling Cameroon People's Democratic Movement (RDPC); the two parties thus constituted a narrow parliamentary majority with 94 out of 180 seats. Daïssala was appointed to the government as Minister of State for Posts and Telecommunications on 9 April 1992; four other members of the MDR also received positions in the government at the same time.

Daïssala was a member of the Consultative Constitutional Council in 1995, prior to the adoption of the new constitution in January 1996. He was elected to the National Assembly from the Mayo-Kani South constituency of Far North Province in the 1997 parliamentary election and was the only MDR candidate to win a seat, serving in the National Assembly from 1997 to 2002. In the October 1997 presidential election, he supported Movement for Democracy and Progress candidate Samuel Eboua rather than President Biya; following the latter's victory, he was notably absent from Biya's swearing in ceremony on 3 November 1997. After more than five years as Minister of State for Posts and Telecommunications, Daïssala was excluded from the government that was appointed on 7 December 1997. According to Daïssala, his departure from the government was voluntary, based on his desire to serve as a Deputy in the National Assembly.

In May 1998, Daïssala was barred from leaving the country to travel to France for a private visit and his passport was withdrawn. He described this as a violation of human rights. Subsequently, he was said to have regained his passport and was able to travel again. Along with four other opposition parties, including the Social Democratic Front (SDF), the MDR signed a statement on 23 November 2000 calling for the creation of an independent electoral commission and denouncing the government's "contemptuous indifference with respect to the requirement of free, fair and transparent elections".

On 13 January 2001, Daïssala and various other party leaders participated in an unauthorised protest in Yaoundé against the National Election Observatory, believing that it would not be an impartial body. The protest was dispersed by security forces, and Daïssala, along with the other party leaders, was detained for five hours. Following the June 2002 parliamentary election, Daïssala and four other notable northern politicians released a statement in July, in which they alleged electoral fraud and announced the formation of a "resistance front". They warned that the RDPC was moving the country back to single-party rule and called on politicians "to transcend any divergence, selfishness and personal ambition in order to create a movement capable of saving Cameroon from collapse". He also joined other northern politicians in signing a September 2002 memo decrying the government's alleged marginalization and neglect of the north and urging that more attention be paid to addressing the north's problems.

Daïssala supported President Biya in the October 2004 presidential election, and subsequently, after seven years out of the government, he was appointed as Minister of Transport in the government named on 8 December 2004. As Minister of Transport, Daïssala signed an open skies agreement with United States Assistant Secretary for African Affairs Jendayi Frazer on 16 February 2006, thereby permitting mutual unrestricted air travel between the two countries.

Daïssala ran again for a parliamentary seat in the July 2007 parliamentary election, saying that he believed that a minister in the government should stand for election; he also said that if the MDR ever obtained a parliamentary majority, it would immediately pass a law requiring ministers to stand as parliamentary candidates. However, the MDR failed to win any National Assembly seats in the 2007 election, and Daïssala was defeated in Mayo-Kani South constituency. The MDR list in Mayo-Kani South narrowly lost with 48.67% of the vote against 51.33% for the RDPC list. Although Daïssala said that he was willing to stay in the government despite his electoral defeat, he was excluded from the government that was appointed on 7 September 2007. In addition to the dwindling of the MDR's support, another factor in Daïssala's dismissal was thought to be his lackluster response to the crash of Kenya Airways Flight 507 at Douala in May 2007; he had been criticized for inactivity following the crash and failing to visit the crash site.

Daïssala and the MDR supported the 2008 constitutional revision that removed the presidential two-term limit, thereby permitting Biya to run for another term in 2011. However, Daïssala also said that he favored other constitutional changes, such as the creation of a two-round voting system and compulsory voting.

In May 2013, President Biya appointed Daïssala to the Senate of Cameroon. He was one of 30 senators to receive their seats by presidential appointment; the other 70 senators were indirectly elected. Biya appointed three senators for each region, and Daïssala was one of the three to come from the Far North Region. When the Bureau of the Senate was elected on 12 June 2013, Daïssala received the post of Secretary.
