= Paulette Bisseck =

Senator, South Region (Cameroon)
- In office 8 May 2013 – 29 June 2023

Personal details
- Born: Paulette Mengue Ajomo; 25 July 1953 Ebolowa, South Region, Cameroon
- Died: 29 June 2023 (aged 69) Paris, France
- Resting place: Nsélang, Biwong-Bulu, Mvila Division, South Region, Cameroon
- Party: Cameroon People's Democratic Movement (RDPC / CPDM)
- Education: University of Yaoundé
- Occupation: Chemist; University lecturer; Politician; Senator

Paulette Bisseck (née Paulette Mengue Ajomo; 25 July 1953 – 29 June 2023) was a Cameroonian chemist, academic, politician, and Senator of the South Region of Cameroon. She served multiple terms in the Senate and was Questeur of the Senate Bureau.

== Early life and education ==
Bisseck was born on 25 July 1953 in Ebolowa, South Region, and was the eldest of four children.

She completed a Baccalauréat in Experimental Sciences (series D) at Lycée Joss, Douala, in 1971. She obtained a Licence in Chemistry in 1975 and a DEA in Organic Chemistry in 1978. She later earned her doctorate in “Chemistry of Natural Substances” in 1984 from the University of Yaoundé, in partnership with the CNRS (France) and the University of Glasgow (UK).

From 1979 to 1985 she was an Assistant Lecturer in the Department of Organic Chemistry and later became a permanent lecturer at the University of Yaoundé I. She was a researcher at the University of Yaounde and the Higher Teachers Training College Yaounde.

== Professional and institutional career ==
From 2001 to 2 April 2007, Bisseck was chair of the board of directors of the Foundation for Environment and Development in Cameroon (FEDEC), a nonprofit trust recognized as a public-interest organization in Cameroon.

Since 2019, Paulette Bisseck has provided support to young girls through her Honorable Paulette Bisseck Award for Academic Excellence for girls who passed the Primary School Leaving Certificate (CEP) and the entrance exam for 6th grade or the first year of technical education in the Biwung Bulu District.

== Political career ==
Bisseck was a member of the Cameroon People's Democratic Movement (RDPC). Her political engagement began in 1985 when she was elected Deputy Secretary of the National Bureau of the RDPC Women's Wing. She became an alternate member of the Central Committee in 1996 and a full member in 2011. Paulette Bisseck was also a member of the National Bureau of the CPDM Women's organization ( OFRDPC) where she was assigned as the Delegate of Education and Culture and Delegate for Program Development. She was later appointed to the National Secretariat of the Central Committee and the General Secretariat of the Central committee where she served as a Special Advisor responsible for women and youth issues. .

She was an advocate for good governance with several organizations she belonged which includes the Trust Foundation for compensation and Mitigation of the Environmental and Socio-economic Impacts of the Chad-Cameroon pipeline, the Tripartite Convention Word Bank-State of Cameroon (SNH)- cotco ExxonMobil, the National Commission for Human Rights and Freedom and Camnafaw IPPF.

=== Senate career ===
She was first appointed as Senator for the South Region by the president of the Republic through Decree No. 2013/149 of 8 May 2013. During the inaugural legislature, she served as Quaestor within the very first bureau of the Cameroonian Senate, led by Marcel Niat Njifenji and elected on 12 June 2013. The president renewed his trust in her when she was again included in the second Senate legislature, following Decree No. 2018/242 of 12 April 2018 appointing Senators. Her mandate continued into the third legislature as a full Senator for the South Region, pursuant to Decree No. 2023/188 of 31 March 2023.

== Death and funeral ==
Paulette Bisseck died on 29 June 2023 in Paris after a long illness, a fact officially announced by the president of the Senate. Her remains returned to Cameroon on 15 July 2023, followed by a parliamentary homage, a religious service, and her burial on 22 July 2023 in her native village Nsélang, Biwong-Bulu.

A Senate homage ceremony was held in Yaoundé in the presence of Senate President Marcel Niat Njifenji.

== Legacy ==
Colleagues and political leaders remembered her as a committed academic, community advocate, and public servant. The President of the Republic described her as a “seasoned academic and an enterprising woman committed to youth mentoring.” An annual “Paulette Bisseck Excellence Award” was created to support young girls preparing for key academic examinations.
