= Mariam Iddrisu =

Ghanaian politician

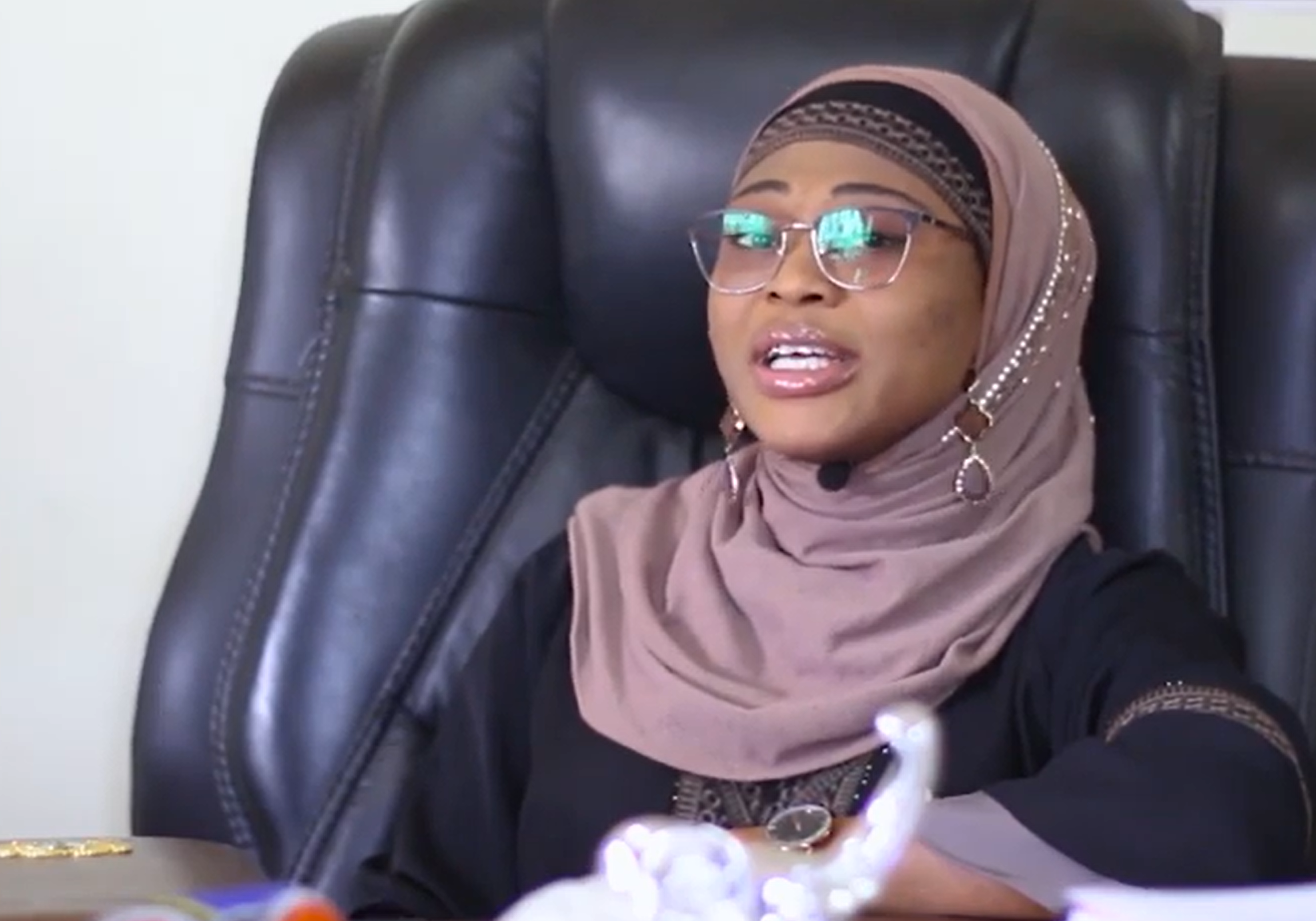

Mayor (Municipal Chief Executive) Sagnarigu Municipality

Personal details
- Party: New Patriotic Party
- Education: Tamale Technical University

Mariam Iddrisu is the Mayor (Municipal Chief Executive) of Sagnarigu Municipality in Ghana's Northern Region.

== Education ==
Mariam Iddrisu attended the Ghana Senior High School, in Tamale from 1997 to 1999. She was subsequently enrolled at the Tamale Technical University (formerly known as the Tamale Polytechnic) where she obtained HND in Secretaryship and Management from 2001 to 2003. Then to University of Cape Coast with bachelor's degree in Management Studies 2007 -2009. She later obtained a Master of Philosophy degree in Community Health and Development from the University for Development Studies, Tamale from 2012 - 2014. In 2014 she and Mahama Saaka published "Patterns and determinants of essential newborn care practices in rural areas of northern Ghana" which recommended that the country's newborn care should be extended from medical centre into wider community.

== Career ==
She was a former Senior Executive Officer of Ghana Health Service in 2005. She was appointed as the youngest mayor in Ghana for the Sagnarigu Municipality in 2017. Over 260 people have similar positions in Ghana but only 36 of them are women. In 2019 she was one of the Vice Presidents of the Network for Locally Elected Women of Africa (REFELA - West Africa), which seeks to increase women's leadership in local communities across Africa. Prior to being elected as a Mayor, she worked as administrative staff and later Public Health Officer with the Ghana Health Service, and has authored research on women's health in local communities.

She was also elected as the National Women Caucus President of NALAG( National Association of Local Authorities of Ghana) from 2019 to 2021.

In 2019 as vice-president of the Network of Locally Elected Women of Africa and as Mayor she went to eThekwini in South Africa to attend the World Congress of United Cities and Local Governments and World Summit of Local and Regional Leaders. She presented on the subject of intergenerational peace and solidarity.

She is a member of the New Patriotic Party.

== Family life ==
She is married to Alhaji Engr. Mohammed Habib Abdallah with six children.
