= Vanessa Tchatchou case =

- Date: 20 August 2011
- Location: Yaoundé, Cameroon
- Type: Child abduction
- Perpetrator: Jocelyne Ngbwa (Note: Ngbwa was convicted in connection with the theft and murder of the baby.)
- Outcome: Jocelyne Ngbwa convicted in October 2012
- Convictions: Theft and murder of Vanessa Tchatchou's baby

Vanessa Tchatchou case is a case involving a stolen baby in Cameroon.

== Context and course of events ==
Vanessa's baby disappeared shortly after she gave birth on August 20, 2011, at a hospital in Yaoundé. Vanessa Tchatchou was 17 years old at the time and was a secondary-school student from a disadvantaged background. Her daughter disappeared mysteriously between the delivery room and the incubator where she was supposed to be placed.

Convinced that she was the victim of a child-trafficking ring, she referred the matter to the public prosecutor.

The case took on a political dimension when Issa Tchiroma Bakary stated in early February 2012 that the child had died, effectively bringing the case to a close. According to the government, the newborn had been kidnapped by a couple and, because of the infant's fragile health, she subsequently died and been buried by the couple.

Vincent-Sosthène Fouda, whose candidacy for the presidency had been rejected in the October 2011 election, was detained after participating in a demonstration in support of Vanessa on 10 February 2012.

== Sequels ==
In October 2012, Jocelyne Ngbwa was convicted of the theft and murder of Vanessa's baby. Other mothers have also reported the disappearance of their babies in Cameroon.

Vanessa decides to pursue legal studies at the University of Dschang and becomes a lawyer in Cameroon.

In November 2024, appearing on the Equinoxe Television channel, she accused a woman named Caroline Mendjang Tikum Eteh (wife of Atangana) of being the person who stole her child.
