= 2018 Cameroonian Senate election =

- 25 March 2018
- 70 of 100 seats in the Senate; 51 seats needed for a majority
- Turnout: 97.92% (▼1.03pp)
Party	Leader	Vote %	Seats	+/–
RDPC	Paul Biya	81.13	63	+7
SDF	John Fru Ndi	8.61	7	−6
This lists parties that won seats. See the complete results below.
President of the Senate before	President of the Senate after
Marcel Niat Njifenji; RDPC	Marcel Niat Njifenji; RDPC

Elections to the Senate of Cameroon were held on 25 March 2018.

== Electoral system ==
The Senate has 100 seats, of which 70 are elected and 30 appointed by the President, with each region having 10 Senators. The elected seats are elected by the 10,636 members of the 360 municipal councils.

Elections to the Senate were held for the first time on 14 April 2013. Marcel Niat Njifenji was elected as President of the Senate on 12 June 2013. The President of the Senate is the constitutionally designated successor to the President of the Republic in case of a vacancy in the latter office.

== See also ==
- Politics of Cameroon
