= Aboubakary Abdoulaye =

Cameroonian politician and traditional ruler (born 1961)

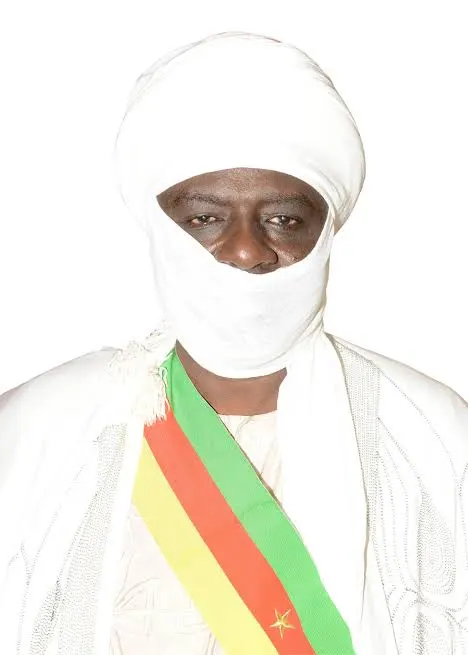

President of the Senate of Cameroon
- Incumbent
- Assumed office 17 March 2026
- Preceded by: Marcel Niat Njifenji

Member of the Senate of Cameroon for the North Region
- Incumbent
- Assumed office 14 May 2013

Lamido of Rey Bouba
- Incumbent
- Assumed office 2006
- Preceded by: Moustapha Abdoulaye

Personal details
- Born: 21 December 1961 (age 64) Lamidate of Rey-Bouba
- Party: CPDM
- Education: National School of Administration and Magistracy

Aboubakary Abdoulaye (born 21 December 1961) is a Cameroonian politician and traditional ruler who has served as President of the Senate of Cameroon since 2026. A member of the Cameroon People's Democratic Movement, he is also the lamido of Rey Bouba in the North Region. He previously served as First Vice-President of the Senate from 2013 to 2026.

== Biography ==
=== Early life and education ===
Aboubakary Abdoulaye was born on 21 December 1961 in the department of Mayo-Rey. He is the son of Abdoulaye Ahmadou, the former lamido of Rey Bouba. He became lamido of Rey Bouba in 2006 following the death of his elder brother, Moustapha Abdoulaye.

Abdoulaye studied at the National School of Administration and Magistracy (ENAM) in Yaoundé and trained as a civil administrator.

=== Career ===
Abdoulaye began his career in the Cameroonian civil service. From 1987 to 1991, he was head of the records and archives service in the Directorate of Presidential Correspondence. From 1991 to 1994, he served as a studies officer in the Directorate of Legislative and Regulatory Affairs attached to the Office of the Prime Minister, before becoming an attaché in the Civil Cabinet of the Presidency.

In 1995, Abdoulaye was appointed Secretary of State for Agriculture. He subsequently held several positions as chairman of boards of directors, including that of the Mission for the Development and Equipment of Urban and Rural Territories (MAETUR). He also chaired the management committee for FAO and World Food Programme interventions and the board of the International Institute for Water and Environmental Engineering (2iE) in Ouagadougou.

Abdoulaye is a member of the RDPC and has served as head of the party's permanent regional delegation in the North Region. He was appointed senator for the North Region in 2013 and became First Vice-President of the Senate following the establishment of the chamber. He retained the position through successive Senate legislatures from 2013 to 2026 and frequently presided over Senate proceedings in the absence of President Marcel Niat Njifenji.

On 17 March 2026, Abdoulaye was elected President of the Senate, succeeding Niat Njifenji. He was the sole candidate and received all 84 votes cast.
