= 2023 Cameroonian Senate election =

- 12 March 2023
- 70 of 100 seats in the Senate; 51 seats needed for a majority
- Turnout: 98.11% (▲0.19pp)
Party	Leader	Vote %	Seats	+/–
RDPC	Paul Biya	86.56	70	+7
This lists parties that won seats. See the complete results below.
President of the Senate before	President of the Senate after
Marcel Niat Njifenji; RDPC	Marcel Niat Njifenji; RDPC

The 2023 Cameroonian senatorial elections took place on 12 March 2023 in order to elect 70 of the 100 members of the Cameroonian Senate.

With the support of a large majority of municipal and regional councillors, the ruling Cameroon People's Democratic Rally won all the seats.

== Electoral system ==
The Senate is the upper house of the bicameral parliament of Cameroon. It is composed of 100 senators who are fully renewed every five years. Each of the 10 regions of Cameroon is represented by ten senators, seven of whom are elected by an electoral college composed of members of the municipal and regional councils, i.e. 70 elected senators. The three remaining senators from each region are appointed by the President of the Republic, i.e. thirty senators.

In each region, the seats of the seven elected senators are filled according to a mixed system with a majority purpose: this is a multi-member proportional vote combined with a majority bonus awarded to the list that comes first. Voters vote for a closed list of candidates, without mixing or preferential voting . The list that obtained the absolute majority of votes cast wins all seven seats to be filled in the region. If none of them achieves this majority, the list that comes first wins a bonus of four seats, and the three remaining seats are distributed proportionally according to the rule of the largest remainder between all the lists that have crossed the regional electoral thresholdof 5% of the votes cast, including the list that comes first. In the event of a tie in the votes of the two leading lists, the latter receive half of the bonus, i.e. two seats each.

The vote of the grand electors takes place in the chief towns of the departments, by secret ballot. It is obligatory, under penalty of forfeiture of the mandate of municipal or regional councilor. In return, the State covers the travel expenses and allows voting by proxy via another member of the electoral college, at the rate of only one proxy per member. Candidates must be at least forty years of age, have Cameroonian nationality by birth, reside in the region where they are running and belong to a political party.

== See also ==
- Politics of Cameroon
