= Lawrence Fonka Shang =

Cameroonian politician

3rd President of the National Assembly of Cameroon
- In office 8 April 1988 – 31 March 1992
- Preceded by: Salomon Tandeng Muna
- Succeeded by: Cavayé Yéguié Djibril

Personal details
- Died: 1992
- Party: Cameroon People's Democratic Movement

Lawrence Fonka Shang was President of the National Assembly of Cameroon from 1988 to 1992. He succeeded Salomon Tandeng Muna and was succeeded by Cavayé Yéguié Djibril. He was Anglophone Cameroonian.
