= Movement for the Defence of the Republic =

Political party in Cameroon

Movement for the Defence of the Republic Mouvement pour la Défense de la République
- President: Paulin Djorwé
- Founder: Dakolé Daïssala
- Founded: 9 October 1991; 34 years ago
- Headquarters: Yaoundé, Cameroon
- Ideology: Republicanism
- Colors: Ice Blue
- Slogan: Peace - Harmony - Liberty (French: Paix - Concorde - Liberté)
- Senate: 1 / 100
- National Assembly: 2 / 180

The Movement for the Defence of the Republic (French: Mouvement pour la Défense de la République, MDR) is a political party in Cameroon. It was founded in 1991 by Dakolé Daïssala, who led the party until his death in 2022.

== History ==
The Movement for the Defence of the Republic first contested national elections in 1992, when it won six seats in the parliamentary elections. In the 1997 elections, the party was reduced to a single seat, which it lost in the 2002 elections. The MDR did not win a seat in the 2007 parliamentary election.

The party returned to the National Assembly in the 2013 parliamentary election, winning one seat. In the 2020 parliamentary elections, it won two seats, both in the Mayo-Kani South constituency in the Far North Region. The elected deputies were Guiswe Badoma and Aïcha Blanche Jacqueline Dague. The party also won control of three municipalities in the 2020 municipal elections.

Daïssala died on 9 August 2022. Following his death, Paulin Djorwé, a long-standing party spokesman, was chosen to lead a transitional leadership structure. An extraordinary national convention held in Maroua on 5–6 October 2024 elected Djorwé as national president and adopted revised party statutes and a renewed central committee.

Following Daïssala's death, a leadership dispute emerged within the party.

The party subsequently became the subject of a leadership dispute involving Tigana Tassi Daïssala, a son of the party's founder. On 17 December 2023, an extraordinary national convention held in Yaoundé designated him as national president. The convention and Tigana Tassi's leadership were contested by Djorwé. The dispute subsequently went before the courts and, on 10 July 2025, the Mfoundi High Court invalidated the 2023 convention.

The MDR formally endorsed Paul Biya for the 2004 and 2025 presidential elections, rather than putting forward its own candidate.

== Election results ==
=== Presidential elections ===
Election	Candidate	Votes	'%	Result
1992	Did not participate			
1997	Samuel Eboua	83,506	2.44%	Lost ✗
2004	Did not participate			
2011	Did not participate			
2018	Did not participate			
2025	Did not participate			

=== National Assembly elections ===
Election	Leader	Votes	%	Seats	+/–	Position	Status
1992	Dakolé Daïssala	87,440	4.09	6 / 180	▲6	▲4th	Opposition
1997	Dakolé Daïssala	71,762	2.48	1 / 180	▼5	▼6th	Opposition
2002	Dakolé Daïssala			0 / 180	▼1		Extra-parliamentary
2007	Dakolé Daïssala	47,992	1.53	0 / 180	Steady	▲4th	Extra-parliamentary
2013	Dakolé Daïssala			1 / 180	▲1	▼7th	Opposition
2020	Dakolé Daïssala			2 / 180	▲2	7th	Opposition
