= Geneviève Tjoues =

Cameroonian politician

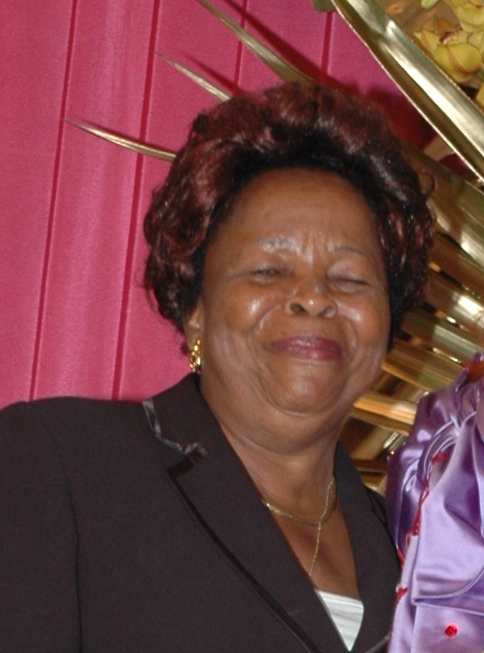
- Tjoues in 2012
- Born: 31 January 1944 (age 82); Niel, Cameroon
- Died: France
- Citizenship: Cameroonian
- Education: certificate of higher education in social economics and in textile and clothing
- Occupations: Teacher, Politician
- Organization: Rainbow Foundation
- Title: Vice Senate President
- Political party: Cameroon People's Democratic Movement
- Children: 3

Geneviève Hanlong Tjoues (born 31 January 1944) is a Cameroonian politician who is currently a Vice President of the Senate.

== Early life and education ==
Geneviève Hanlong was born in Niel in the Littoral region of Cameroon on 31 January 1944. She was orphaned at a young age and grew up under the authority of Catholic nuns in Edéa. She has a certificate of higher education in social economics and in textile and clothing. She studied in France.

== Career ==
Tjoues was a high school teacher from 1979 until 1997, running the Notre Dame d'Edéa school.

In 1978, Tjoues founded the Rainbow Foundation which provides vocational training for young single mothers, and she is considered the "godmother of single mothers" in Edea. In 1995, she founding the company Alpha Lumière Sarl.

Tjoues is a member of the Cameroon People's Democratic Movement and president of the women's organisation. She was vice president of the party congress in 2011 and a deputy and vice president of the party in the National Assembly from 1997 until 2010.

In 2013, she was one of five women elected in the country's first Senate elections and was appointed a Vice-President of the Senate by President Paul Biya.

== Personal life ==
Tjoues, a Christian, is married and has three children.
