= Orders, decorations, and medals of Cameroon =

Orders, decorations, and medals of Cameroon include:

- Order of Valour (Ordre de la Valeur; seven grades)
- Cameroon Order of Merit (Ordre du Mérite Camerounais; four grades)
- Agricultural Order of Merit (Ordre du Mérite Agricole; three grades)
- Sports Order of Merit (Ordre du Mérite Sportif; three grades)
- Cameroon Cross of Military Valour (Croix de la Valeur Militaire du Cameroun)
- Medal of Valiancy (Médaille de la Vaillance)
- Medal of Merit of the Forces of Law and Order (Médaille de la Force Publique)
- Labour Medal of Honour (Médaille d’Honneur du Travail)
