= Macoura Dao =

Ivorian politician

Macoura Dao, born Macoura Coulibaly, is an Ivorian local politician. She is mayor of Foumbolo. In 2019 she succeeded Célestine Ketcha Courtès as President of the Network for Locally Elected Women of Africa (REFELA).

== Career ==
In the 2013 Ivorian local elections Macoura Dao stood for the RDR party, receiving 35.22% of the mayoral vote in Foumbolo.

In 2017 she won an Excellence Award from the Ministry of the Interior and Security, taking second place prize for the best locally elected official. Macoura Dao was appointed President of REFELA at a meeting in Cairo on June 17, 2019.
