= Liberty Movement of Cameroon Youth =

Cameroonian political party

The Liberty Movement of Cameroon Youth (French: Mouvement pour la Libération de la Jeunesse Camerounaise) was a political party in Cameroon led by Dieudonné Tina.

== History ==
The party was established in August 1993 by Dieudonné Tina and was officially registered on 5 August. It contested the May 1997 parliamentary elections, receiving 0.4% of the vote and winning a single seat. It supported incumbent President Paul Biya in the October 1997 presidential elections; which led to a split in the party as Marcel Yando led a group that seceded from the party to establish the Movement for the Liberation and Development of Cameroon in 1998.

The party lost its seat in the 2002 parliamentary elections.
