= Célestine Ketcha Courtès =

Cameroonian businesswoman and politician (born 1964)

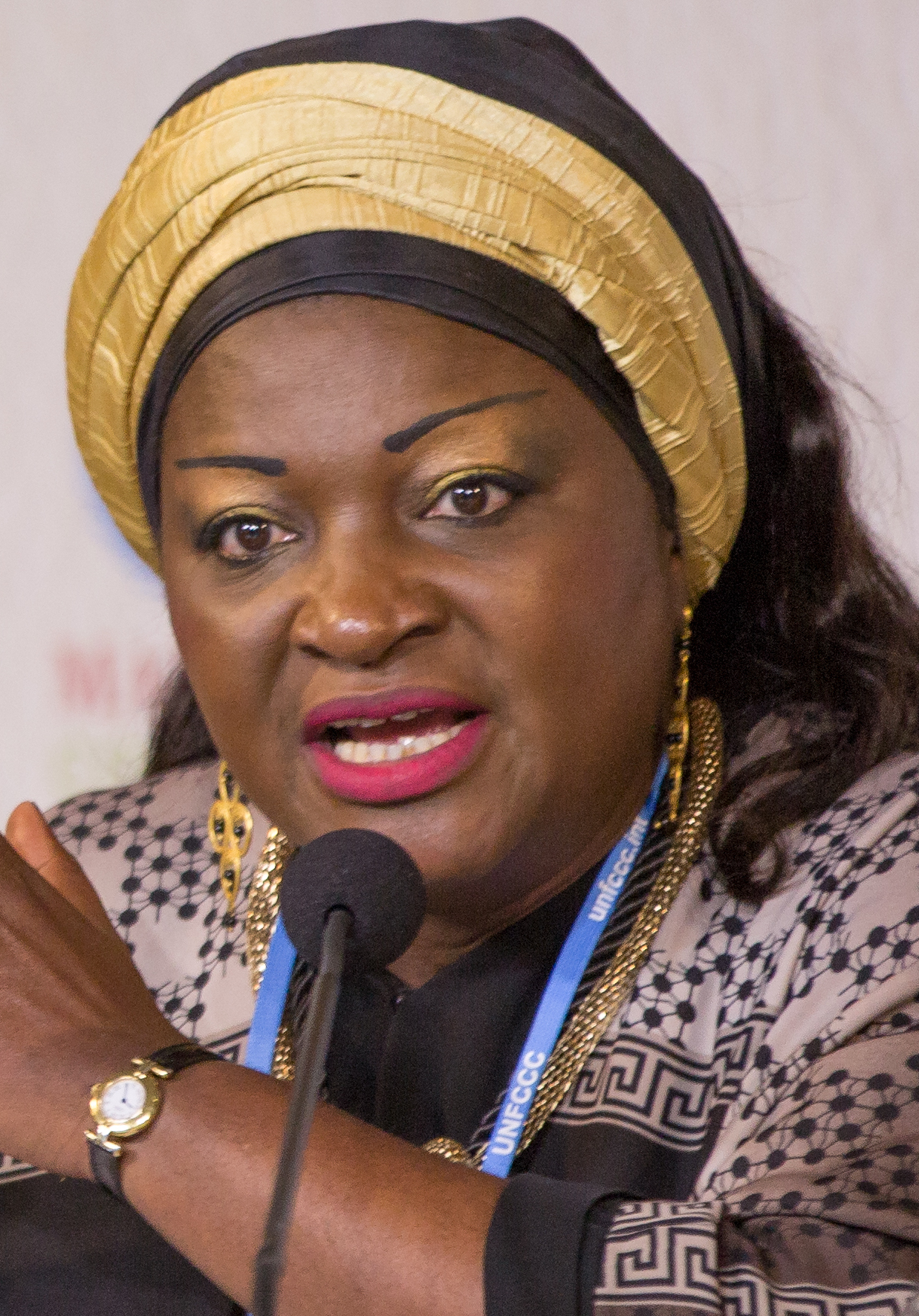
- Courtès in 2016

Minister of Housing and Urban Development
- Incumbent
- Assumed office 4 January 2019
- Prime Minister: Joseph Ngute
- Preceded by: Jean-Claude Mbwentchou

Mayor of Bangangté
- In office 1 July 2007 – 4 January 2019
- Preceded by: Marcel Niat Njifenji
- Succeeded by: Jonas Kouamouo

Personal details
- Born: 13 October 1964 (age 61) Maroua, Cameroon
- Citizenship: Cameroon; France
- Party: CPDM
- Children: 2

Célestine Ketcha Courtès (born 13 October 1964) is a Cameroonian businesswoman and politician who served as mayor of Bangangté and is president of the Network for Locally Elected Women of Africa (in French, Réseau des Femmes Elues Locales d’Afrique, often called REFELA).

== Early life and education ==
Courtès was born on 13 October 1964 in Maroua in the northern region of Cameroon. Her father, who she is named after, was the Chief Superior of Bangangté from 1912 to 1943. He died when she was 14. In order to escape a marriage her grandfather, King Franćois Njiki, had arranged, she moved to Foumban high school before returning to Manengouba high school where she completed a German A4 Baccalaureat. She has a diploma of Higher Education in Commercial Techniques and a Diploma of Higher Studies in Commerce and Economy from the ESSEC in Douala. She has dual nationality (France and Cameroon), which earned her criticism from political opponents.

== Career ==
Courtès worked as a sales and marketing executive for the Dimenteries du Cameroun. She joined the Cameroon People's Democratic Movement due to her admiration of President Paul Biya, and became president of its women's organisation OFRDPC.

Courtès was elected mayor of the commune of Bangangté in the Ndé division of the West Region in 2007. She is Queen mother of Bangangté and Bangoulap. She also served as Vice President of the Association for Municipal Help and Development, President of Panthère du Ndé, Ambassador of French-speaking Africa in the European Union Working Groups on Dialogue Structure on Aid.

Courtès set up a business called Queen Fish Cameroon, which sought to break the monopoly of Congelcam. After her mother's death, she set up a charitable foundation in her memory called "La Case à la Table Ouverte de Maman Pauline." In June 2014, she received a United Nations Public Service Award in a ceremony in Seoul for her humanitarian work for a project aimed to provide potable water to all inhabitants of Bangangté, meeting the Millennium Development Goals.

In July 2011, a lawsuit was brought by Courtès' cousin, a shareholder of a similar company, alleging irregularities in her business. She was sentenced to one year imprisonment with a three-year pardon by the District Court of Wouri after being found guilty of forgery and the abuse of social assets and credits. She was also ordered to pay a fine of 15 million CFA franc. On 8 January 2015, the Court of Appeal upheld the award of the district court but reduced the sentence to a 167,100 Cfa fine and nine-month detention. The case is being appealed to the Supreme Court.

At the end of her mayoral term in 2013, Courtès was a candidate for the National Assembly and was criticised for holding dual citizenship in a country that does not recognise it and for voting in French elections. She was re-elected as mayor in September 2013 for another term until 2018, but has faced criticism of her leadership, as well as praise as a model of leadership in Africa in the fight for equality. In April 2015, she was one of three nominees for the José Eduardo dos Santos Prize for the African Mayor Awards, small cities category.

On 1 December 2015, Courtès became President of the Network of Locally Elected Women of African, representing the Central African region, replacing Mauritian Fatimatou Abdel Malick. The network, formed in Tangier in March 2011, brings together women elected in local government positions. She had previously presided over the subregion of Central Africa and created country structures in Chad, Gabon, Democratic Republic of Congo and Central African Republic.

Courtès is a close friend of Anne Hidalgo, mayor of Paris. In January 2016, she received a U.S. Embassy delegation led by Cultural Affairs Officer Merlyn Schultz, who congratulated her on her "exemplary leadership". Later in 2016, Courtès was one of a hundred mayors invited by United Nations Secretary-General Ban Ki-moon to contribute to a new urban agenda ahead of the Habitat III Summit in Quito. She also participated in 2016 United Nations Climate Change Conference in Morocco.

== Awards and honours ==
- Knight of the National Order of Sports Merit (one of only two women to receive this award along with Françoise Mbango Etone
- Knight of the National Order of Valour, 2015
- United Nations Public Service Awards, 2014

== Personal life ==
Courtès is married and has two daughters. She speaks French, English and German.
