= List of presidents of the National Assembly of Cameroon =

List of presidents of the National Assembly of Cameroon.

== Presidents of the Representative Assembly of Cameroon (ARCAM) ==
Name	Entered office	Left office	Notes
Jean Grassard	1946	1950	
Léon Fouletier	1950	1951	

== Presidents of the Territorial Assembly of Cameroon (ATCAM) ==
Name	Entered office	Left office	Notes
Paul Soppo Priso	1952	1956	

== Presidents of the Legislative Assembly of Cameroon ==
Name	Entered office	Left office	Party	Notes
Ahmadou Ahidjo	January 28, 1957	May 10, 1957		
Jules Ninine	May 10, 1957	October 13, 1958		
Daniel Kemajou	October 13, 1958	October 13, 1959		
Jean Baptiste Mabaya	October 13, 1959	May 17, 1960		
Louis Kemayou	May 17, 1960	October 10, 1961	UC	

== Presidents of the National Assembly of Cameroon ==
Name	Entered office	Left office	Party	Notes
Marcel Marigoh Mboua	May 11, 1962	1973	UC/UNC	
Salomon Tandeng Muna	June 14, 1973	1988	UNC/RDPC	
Lawrence Fonka Shang	1988	1992	RDPC	
Cavayé Yéguié Djibril	1992	2026	RDPC	
Théodore Datouo	2026	Present	RDPC	

== Sub-national Legislative Assemblies within the Federal Republic of Cameroon (1961-1972) ==
=== President of the Legislative Assembly of East Cameroon ===
Name	Entered office	Left office
Louis Kemayou	1961	1970
Sanda Oumarou	1970	1972

=== President of the Legislative Assembly of West Cameroon ===
Name	Entered office	Left office
Paul Monyonge Kale	January 10, 1962	August 1966
Willie Ndep Orock Effiom	1968	1972
