= Jean-Baptiste Baskouda =

Cameroonian politician

- Born: 24 August 1957; Cameroon
- Occupation: politician

Jean-Baptiste Baskouda (born 24 August 1957) is a Cameroonian politician who has served in the Senate of Cameroon since 2013. He was Secretary of State for Territorial Administration from 1985 to 1988 and subsequently served as Deputy Director of the Civil Cabinet of the Presidency. Later, he was appointed as Secretary-General of the Ministry of Labor and Social Security on 26 January 2005.

In May 2013, President Biya appointed Baskouda to the newly established Senate. He was one of 30 senators to receive their seats by presidential appointment; the other 70 senators were indirectly elected. Biya appointed three senators for each region, and Baskouda was one of the three to come from the Far North Region. When the Bureau of the Senate was elected on 12 June 2013, Baskouda received the post of Quaestor.
