= Order of Merit (Cameroon) =

Order of Merit Ordre du Mérite Camerounais
- Type: Order
- Awarded for: High services to the State
- Presented by: Cameroon
- Ribbon bar of the order

Precedence
- Next (higher): Order of Valour
- Next (lower): Order of Agricultural Merit

The Order of Merit is an order of knighthood of the Cameroon.

== History ==
It is regulated by the ordonnance N° 72/24 of 30 November 1972. It is one of the four orders of Cameroon:

- Order of Valour
- Order of Merit
- Order of Agricultural Merit
- Order of Sports Merit

== Insignia ==
The ribbon of the order is yellow since 1972. It was made of red, yellow and green stripes earlier.

== Grades ==
The Order of Merit is subdivided into four grades of merit:

- Grand Cordon
- Commander
- Officer
- Knight

== Recipients ==
- Ulric Cross
- Cyprien Katsaris
- Henri Romans-Petit
- Ahmadou Tidjani
- Rheinhold Efufa Becke

=== Grand Cordons ===
- Françoise Foning
- Princess Margriet of the Netherlands
- Josip Broz Tito
- Pieter van Vollenhoven

== See also ==
- Orders, decorations, and medals of Cameroon
