= Madeleine Haoua =

Cameroonian politician

- Born: 1971/03/20; Ngaoubela, Adamaoua region of Cameroon
- Citizenship: Cameroon
- Education: University Degree, PhD
- Alma mater: University of Yaounde
- Occupations: Teacher, Politician
- Style: Activist
- Title: Senator
- Political party: Social Democratic Front
- Awards: Gold medal

Madeleine Haoua (born 20 March 1971) is a Cameroonian politician. She has been a member of the Senate of Cameroon since the 2013 election, representing the opposition Social Democratic Front.

== Early life and professional career ==
Haoua was born in Ngaoubela in the Adamaoua region of Cameroon. She holds a degree in botany and ecology from the University of Yaounde and a PhD from the University of Ngaoundere. She was a teacher at various levels before entering politics. She also won a gold medal in handball in the Organisation du Sport Scolaire et Universitaire du Cameroun (OSSUC).

== Senate career ==
Haoua is a Social Democratic Front activist who has been a member of the Senate since 2013.
