= Ahmadou Tidjani =

Cameroonian politician and civil administrator

Member of the [[Senator of Adamaoua 2013 Senate]]

Member of the Constitutional Council of Cameroon
- Incumbent
- Assumed office 7 February 2018
- President: Paul Biya
- Governor: Governor of the Far North Region (2004–2010)
- Deputy: Deputy Prefect of Diamaré (1982–1984)
- Preceded by: Position established
- Governor: Governor of the West Region (1998–2004)

Personal details
- Born: March 12, 1954 (age 72) Doualayel-Tignère, Adamawa Region, Cameroon
- Party: Social Democratic Front (Cameroon)
- Education: National School of Administration and Magistracy (Cameroon)
- Occupation: Senior civil servant: Prefect of Mayo-Louti (1995–1998); Prefect of Mifi (1992–1995); Prefect of Nkam (1990–1992); Prefect of Mayo-Sava (1984–1990)
- Awards: Grand Officer of the National Order of Valour; Grand Officer of the Order of Malta

Ahmadou Tidjani is a Cameroonian politician and civil administrator known for his career in territorial administration and his role as a senator. Originating from the Adamawa Region of Cameroon, he served in multiple prefect and governor roles before retiring in 2010. Since then, he has been active in the Senate representing the Adamaoua region and serves as a member of the Constitutional Council of Cameroon.

== Early life and education ==
Ahmadou Tidjani was born in Doualayel, located in the Faro-et-Déo department of the Adamawa Region in Cameroon. He is of Muslim faith and attended the Mazenod college during his formative years. Later, he graduated from the National School of Administration and Magistracy (ENAM) in Cameroon, which prepared him for a career in civil administration.

== Administrative and political career ==
Beginning his career in 1981 at the State Inspection General, Ahmadou Tidjani held several prefect positions across Cameroon in regions such as Mayo-Sava, Nkam, Mayo-Louti, and Mifi, serving for about 15 years. He then advanced to governor roles in the West and Far North regions. After retiring from territorial administration in 2010, he settled in Ngaoundéré, the capital of the Adamaoua region. In 2013, he was elected senator representing the Adamaoua region alongside members of the Social Democratic Front (SDF). In 2018, he ended his retirement when appointed as a member of Cameroon's newly formed Constitutional Council, an institution tasked with overseeing the regularity of electoral processes in the country.

== Role in the Constitutional Council ==
As a member of the Constitutional Council since 2018, Ahmadou Tidjani participates in adjudicating electoral disputes and constitutionality issues in Cameroon. His appointment reflects recognition of his extensive experience in public administration and governance. Tidjani has expressed gratitude for the trust placed in him for this highly responsible role.
