= Théodore Datouo =

Cameroonian businessman and politician (born 1960)

President of the National Assembly of Cameroon
- Incumbent
- Assumed office 26 July 2026
- Preceded by: Cavayé Yéguié Djibril

Member of the National Assembly for Hauts-Plateaux
- Incumbent
- Assumed office 22 July 2007

Personal details
- Born: 5 July 1960 (age 66) Bangou, Cameroon
- Party: CPDM
- Education: University of Yaoundé

Théodore Datouo (born 5 July 1960) is a Cameroonian businessman and politician who has served as President of the National Assembly since 2026. A member of the Cameroon People's Democratic Movement, he has been a member of the National Assembly since 2007 and served as one of its vice-presidents from 2013 to 2026.

== Biography ==
Datouo was born on 5 July 1960 in Nkongsamba, Littoral Region. He is from Bangou, in the Hauts-Plateaux Department of the West Region.

He attended Collège Sainte-Jeanne d'Arc in Nkongsamba and obtained a degree in economics at the University of Yaoundé, specializing in business management. He subsequently undertook professional training in areas including multimodal transport, mineral-resource management and project management. In 1981, Datouo became president of the Union of Pupils and Students of Bangou. In 1987, he became secretary-general of the Bangou Development Committee.

Datouo began his professional career in the private sector. In 1987, he took charge of EDA, an import and representation company. In 1989, he moved to Libreville, Gabon, where he headed the Comptoir Commercial d'Afrique. He later became involved with the Big Shop group and, in 2000, became head of Société Équatoriale du Bois, a company within the group. The group's logistics and transport activities subsequently participated as a subcontractor in the Chad–Cameroon Pipeline project. Datouo has also served on the boards of several companies in Cameroon and Central Africa.

Datouo entered parliamentary politics as an alternate deputy in 2002. He was subsequently elected as a titular member of the National Assembly in the 2007 parliamentary election, representing the Hauts-Plateaux constituency in the West Region for the Cameroon People's Democratic Movement. He was elected to the National Assembly again in subsequent legislative elections and, in 2011, he became a member of the Central Committee of the ruling party. In 2013, he was elected one of the vice-presidents of the National Assembly, a position he held until 2026.

On 17 March 2026, Datouo was elected President of the National Assembly, succeeding Cavayé Yéguié Djibril, who had held the position since 1992. He was the sole candidate and received 133 of the 147 votes cast, with 14 abstentions.
