= Isabelle Tokpanou =

Cameroonian politician

- Born: 27 November 1936 (age 89); Kribi
- Citizenship: Cameroonian
- Education: PhD
- Known for: Activism
- Title: Senator
- Political party: Cameroon People's Democratic Movement

Isabelle Marie Ndjole Assouho (born 27 November 1936, in Kribi) is a Cameroonian politician. She was elected senator for the East Region during the first senatorial elections held on 14 April 2013.As a university professor, she was chairman of the board of Yaounde and was replaced by Aminatou Ahidjo on 29 June 2016.

For five years, she was State Secretary at the Ministry of National Education (now the Ministry of Secondary Education). She is married and has four children.

== Education and career ==
Holder of a Baccalaureate obtained in 1957, Tokpanou pursued graduate studies in France where she graduated with a degree in natural sciences in 1963, a DEA in animal physiology in 1975 and a PhD in animal physiology in 1978, all obtained at the University of Poitiers.

In 1963, she began her professional career teaching high schools in Benin, Ivory Coast and France until 1975, when she became an assistant in animal physiology at the University of Benin, today University of Lome in Togo.

In 1978, she entered the University of Yaounde and in 1980, she became a lecturer at the Faculty of Sciences. Thereafter, she became president of the National Assembly for ten years after having been Secretary of State at the Ministry of Education.

== Politics ==
Isabelle Tokpanou is an activist for the CPDM where she is an alternate member of the central committee. She was elected senator of the Eastern Region at the 2013 Cameroonian senatorial Election.
