= International Institute for Water and Environmental Engineering =

Organization in Ouagadougou, Burkina Faso

2iE - International Institute for Water and Environmental Engineering
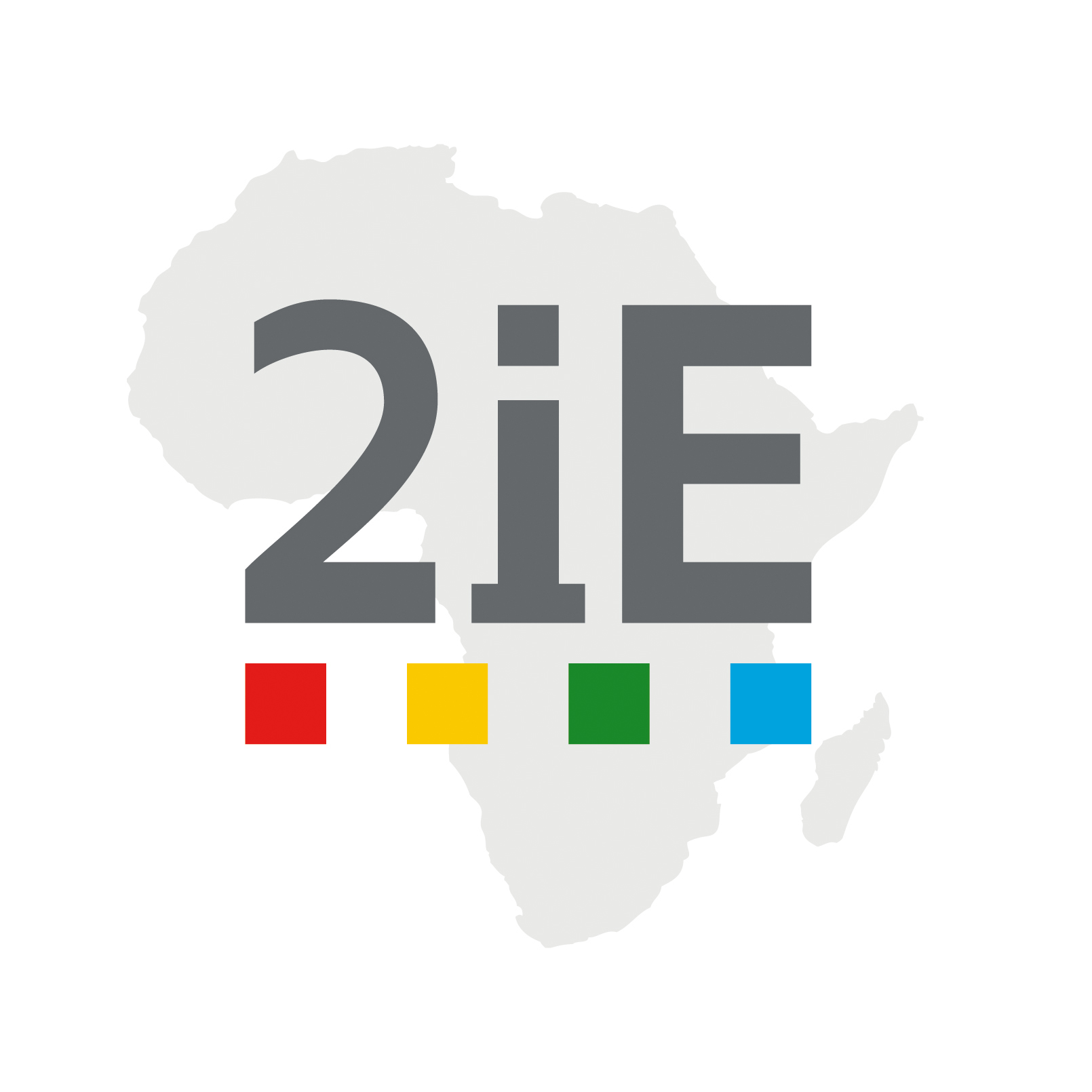
- Type: Higher education and research institute
- Established: 2006; 20 years ago
- Affiliations: CTI, CGE, Campus France, AUF
- Director: El Hadji Bamba Diaw
- Academic staff: 130 researchers and teachers
- Students: 2,000 in initial training, over 1,500 professionals in online training
- Location: Rue de la science, Ouagadougou, 01 BP 594, Burkina Faso; 12.3793°N 1.5032°W
- Language: French, English
- Levels: Bachelor (Bac+3), Master (Bac+5), Specialized Master (Bac+6), MBA, Doctorate (Bac+8), CPGE
- Website: 2iE – Le site officiel

The International Institute for Water and Environmental Engineering (2iE) is a higher education and research institute, a member of the Conférence des grandes écoles (CGE), based in Burkina Faso. Specializing in water, energy, environment, civil engineering, and mining, its engineering degrees have been accredited by the French Commission des Titres d'Ingénieur (CTI), granting them European recognition through the EUR-ACE label. (Note: The EUR-ACE label (EUR-ACE framework) certifies conformity of the training to European standards.)

2iE was established in 2007, resulting from the merger and restructuring of the former inter-state schools EIER (École d'Ingénieurs de l'Equipement Rural) and ETSHER (École des Techniciens de l'Hydraulique et de l'Equipement Rural), created respectively in 1968 and 1970 by 14 West and Central African states.

== History ==
=== Origins: Early African Emancipation ===
The origin of 2iE is linked to the collective political commitment of fourteen West and Central African states (Note: The fourteen states: Mauritania, Mali, Senegal, Guinea, Côte d'Ivoire, Burkina Faso, Togo, Benin, Niger, Chad, Cameroon, the Central African Republic, Gabon, and the Democratic Republic of the Congo (DRC).) determined to equip their new government structures, resulting from independence, with cadres trained on their own continent. The governments invested in several inter-state engineering schools aimed at training the elite of their administrations.

The École d'Ingénieurs de l'Équipement Rural (EIER) was established in 1968 in Ouagadougou, tasked with training and perfecting engineers capable of promoting and implementing the infrastructure and actions necessary for the development of member states, as well as supporting development actions.

Two years later, in 1970, the École des Techniciens de l'Hydraulique et de l'Équipement Rural (ETSHER) was also established in the same spirit.

=== From 1968 to 2005 ===
Over 37 years, from 1968 to 2006, EIER and ETSHER trained more than 3,000 engineers and senior technicians in the fields of hydraulic engineering and rural engineering.

In 2001, the institution became the EIER-ETSHER group, embodying the emergence of a new Africa, ready to meet the challenges of population growth, urbanization, and economic development.

To meet these challenges, EIER-ETSHER reformed and became the International Institute for Water and Environmental Engineering (2iE). The foundation stone was laid in 2006 in the presence of the President of Burkina Faso, Blaise Compaoré, and Paul Ginies, Director-General of 2iE.

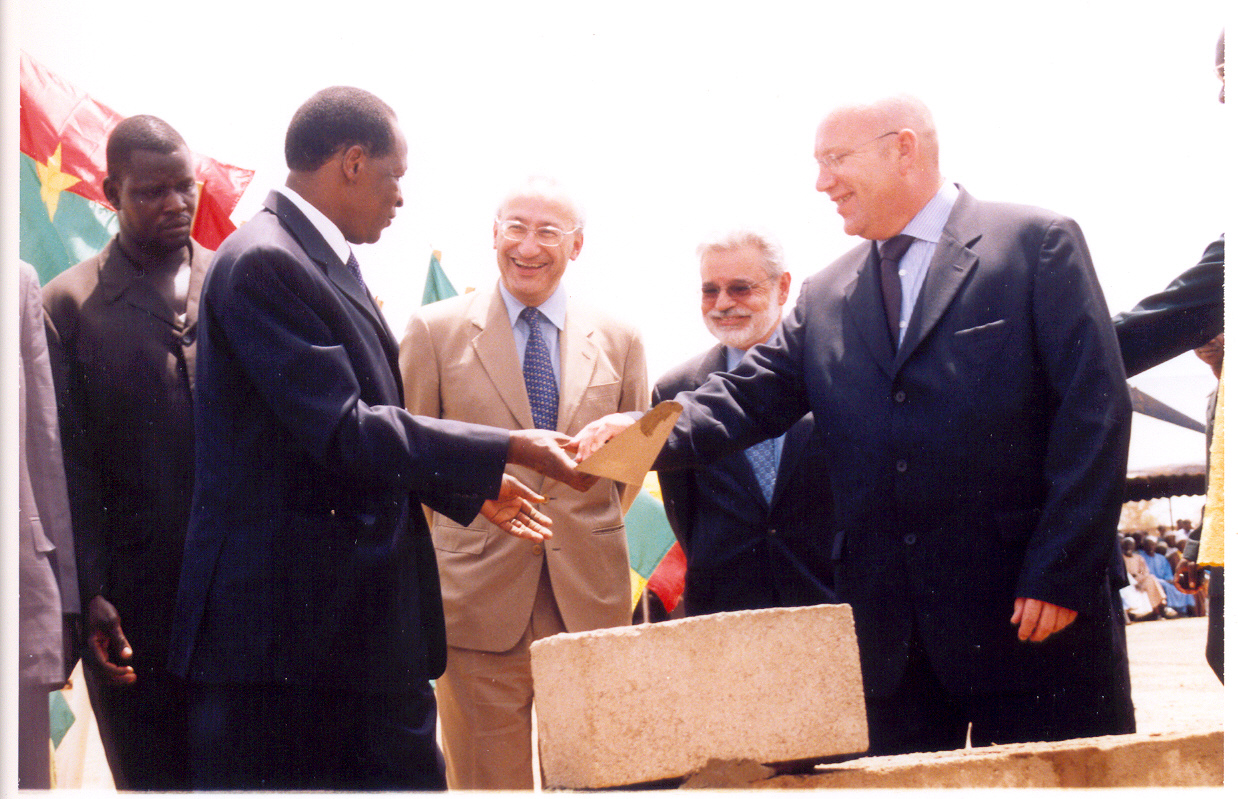
Laying the foundation stone of 2iE in 2006 in the presence of the President of Burkina Faso, Blaise Compaoré, and Paul Ginies, Director-General of 2iE

=== Since 2006 ===
In bankruptcy and threatened with closure, the institution underwent a change of direction with the arrival of a new Director-General, Paul Giniès, and a change in development strategy, focusing on training to meet the needs of private companies.

The 2iE Foundation was created in 2007.

In February 2008, the EIER-ETSHER group transferred its assets to the 2iE Foundation. In May, the 2iE Foundation signed a headquarters agreement with Burkina Faso, granting it diplomatic status. In July, the 2iE Foundation was declared a public utility.

2iE participated with Medef International and Hec Executive in the creation of the African Institute. This association aims to support human development in Africa by creating an interface between recruiters and the various training offers.

In 2013, the institution parted ways with its director-general, Paul Giniès, due to a lack of transparency in the management of the institute, abusive layoffs, and an absence of willingness to improve working conditions deemed "difficult".

== Organization ==
=== Status ===
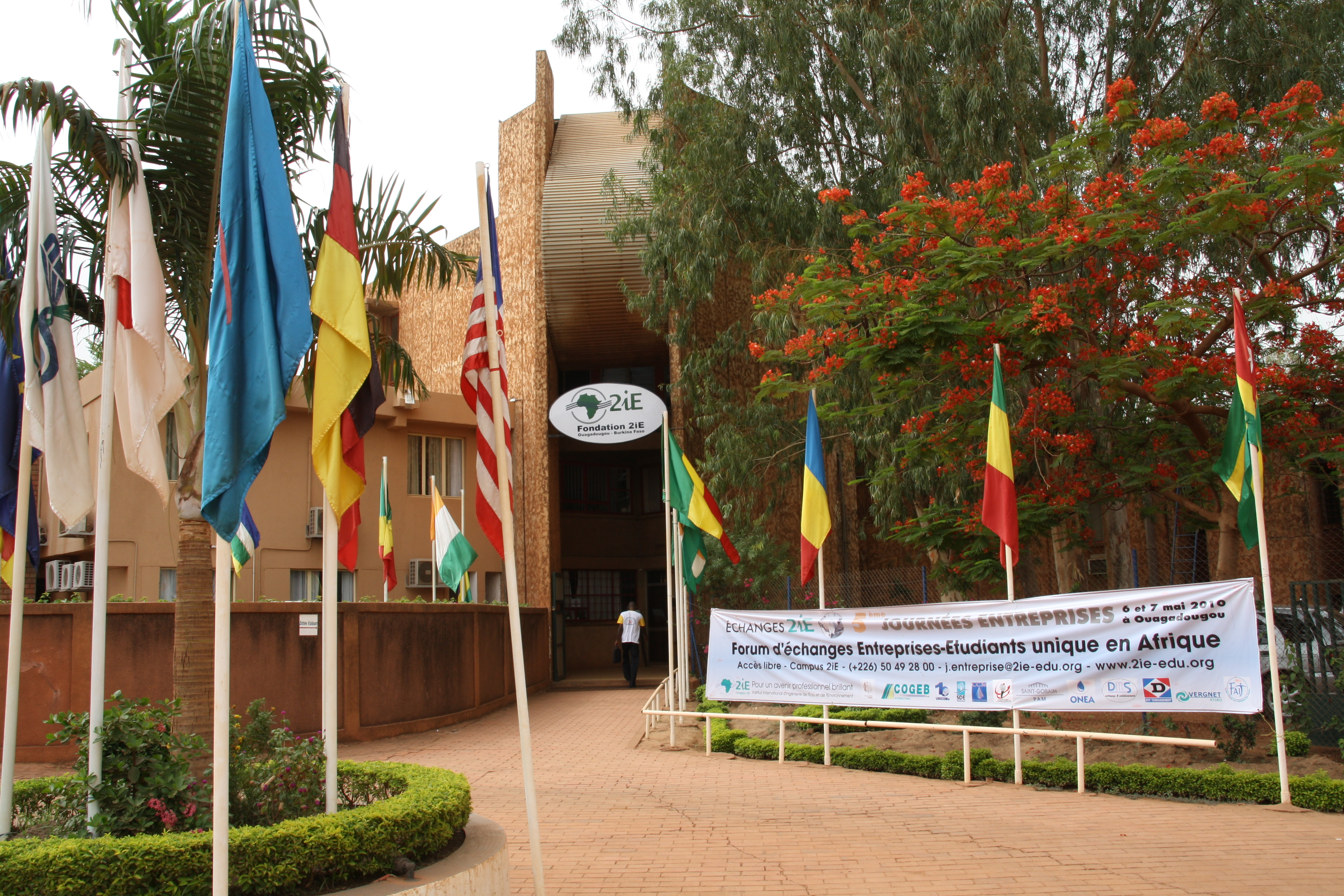
Main entrance of the 2iE Foundation in Ouagadougou

2iE is an international association recognized as a public utility, created on February 22, 2007 and governed by the law of December 15, 1992.

The 2iE Foundation benefits from a headquarters agreement (Note: Under the headquarters agreement signed in Ouagadougou on May 14, 2008, between Paul Ginies, Director-General of 2iE, and Minata Samate, Minister Delegate to the Ministry of Foreign Affairs and Regional Cooperation.) with Burkina Faso, granting it diplomatic status.

The 2iE Foundation is recognized as a public utility. (Note: Under Decree No. 2008-429/PRES/PM/MATD/MEF granting the status of Association recognized as a public utility to the 2iE Foundation.)

== Education ==
2iE has adopted the LMD system, offering degrees at the Bachelor (Bac+3), Master (Bac+5), Specialized Master (Bac+6), and Doctorate (Bac+8) levels.

2iE offers initial training on its campuses in Ouagadougou and Kamboinsen, as well as distance learning, and continuing education sessions for employees of companies or the state.

== Research ==
2iE has two joint research centers. The first, Water and Climate, includes two laboratories (Water and Health, Hydrology and Water Resources). The second, Sustainable Energy and Habitat, includes three laboratories (Biomass, Energy and Biofuels, Solar Energy and Energy Efficiency, Eco-construction Materials).

== International ==
=== Programs ===
2iE offers:

- Degree programs in Water and Sanitation, Energy and Electricity, Civil Engineering and Mining, Environment, and Managerial Sciences.
- A flexible and adapted professional training offer to meet the specific needs of the business world: lack of time, low availability, need for financing.

2iE's programs are accredited in Europe (EUR-ACE label) and by the French Commission of Engineering Titles.

== Bibliography ==
- Paul Ginies and Jean Mazurelle, L'Afrique forme ses élites, éditions L’Harmattan, 2010.
