= Chamber of Commerce (Douala) =

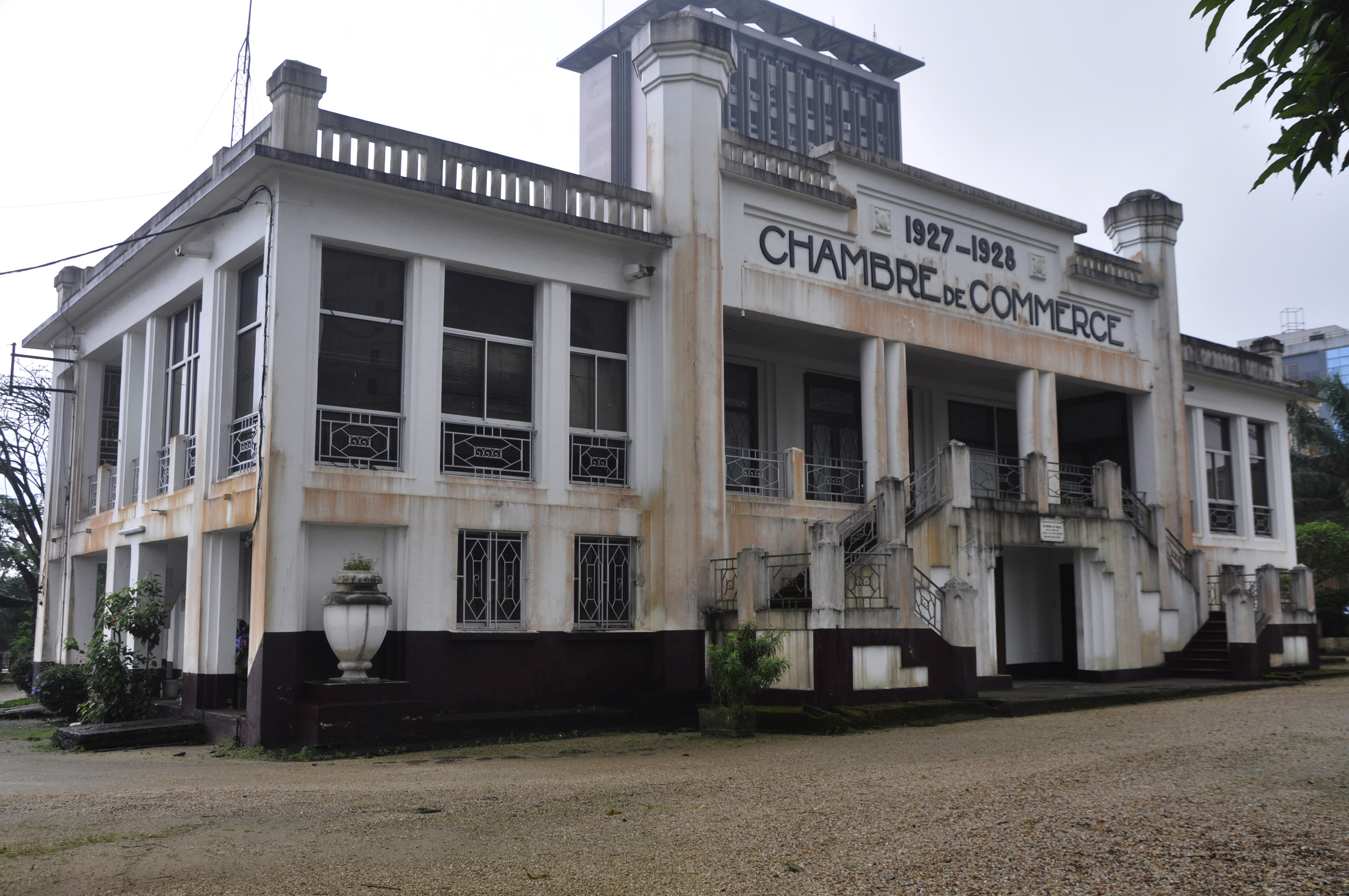
- Interactive map of the Chamber of Commerce area

General information
- Type: Chamber of commerce
- Architectural style: Art nouveau tardif architectural style.
- Location: Douala, Cameroon
- Coordinates: 4.04459°N 9.68624°E
- Construction started: 1927
- Completed: 1928
- Client: The French government

The Chamber of Commerce in Douala, Cameroon, is a building constructed between 1927 and 1928 under the French mandate, under the umbrella of the League of Nations. This building is in a late Art Nouveau architectural style.

== History ==
The Chamber of Commerce was built between 1927 and 1928, and meant to host the Chamber of Commerce. It is among the earliest architectural testimonies of the early French era, within the framework of the Mandate, under the umbrella of the League of Nations, after Germany was defeated in September 1918.

Created in 1921, before the Conference and the treaty of Versailles, the Chamber of Commerce is merely an advisory body. Its mission was to give account of the resources dedicated to development, and also to fix the market prices lists for the farmers. The fifteen members of the Chamber were chosen by the Commissioner of the Republic, and appointed for two years through an arrêté. Among them were two natives: a farmer and a trader, a kind of social innovation within this very context of racial segregation.

At the entrance of the edifice, there is a plate that commemorates General Charles de Gaulle's visit to Cameroon in 1940. He delivered an appeal to the inhabitants to join Free France in front of the building.
