= Dao Zheng =

Taiwanese Buddhist nun (1957–2003)

- Title: Buddhist nun

Personal life
- Born: 27 February 1957 Taiwan
- Died: 18 July 2003 (aged 46)

Religious life
- Religion: Buddhism
- School: Ch'an

Senior posting
- Teacher: Yin Shun

Dao Zheng (道證法師) (27 February 1957 – 18 July 2003) was a Buddhist nun from Taiwan, known for her various writings and dharma talks. She is well known for her famous painting of Amitabha, which she painted while bedridden with cancer.

Prior to entering the Buddhist order, she was a medical student and researcher.
