= Julie C. Dao =

American writer

- Occupation: Writer
- Writing career
- Genres: Young adult fiction; Fantasy
- Notable works: Forest of a Thousand Lanterns; Kingdom of the Blazing Phoenix
- Website: www.juliedao.com

Julie C. Dao is a Vietnamese-American fantasy author. She is best known for her debut novel, Forest of a Thousand Lanterns, an East Asian-inspired retelling of the Evil Queen legend from Snow White, and its sequel Kingdom of the Blazing Phoenix.

== Early life and education ==
Dao was born and grew up in upstate New York, the oldest child of Vietnamese immigrants. She studied pre-med biology in college, but decided not to go into the field.

== Career ==
In 2016, Dao received a three-book deal from Philomel Books, an imprint of Penguin Books.

Forest of a Thousand Lanterns, the first novel in the Rise of the Empress duology, was published in 2017. The young adult (YA) dark fairy tale retelling of Snow White explores the perspective of the Evil Queen and her dark path to the throne. The book received two starred reviews from Publishers Weekly, which called the book a "fascinating examination of destiny, responsibility, and how choices shape a person", and Booklist, which named Forest of a Thousand Lanterns in its lists of Top 10 Diverse Fiction for Older and Middle Readers and Top 10 First Novels for Youth. Rebecca Kuss, writing for Booklist, described Xifeng as an antiheroine whose "relentless pursuit of power is a welcome contrast to princesses of the past". The New York Public Library recognized the book as one of its 2017 Best Books for Teens, and it was named a Junior Library Guild Selection.

In 2018, Dao published the companion novel to Forest of a Thousand Lanterns, titled Kingdom of the Blazing Phoenix. The second book in the Rise of the Empress duology continues the story from the perspective of an exiled princess determined to take back her rightful throne. The book received the honor of Junior Library Guild Selection and garnered a starred review from School Library Journal, which wrote that "the importance of storytelling and of family, biological and chosen, will resonate deeply with readers." Booklist called the characters "complex and intriguing; villains are admirably drawn so the reader sees their path," and Eric Smith of Paste also praised Dao's "beautiful writing and imaginative storytelling."

In 2019, Dao published her third novel, Song of the Crimson Flower, set in the same world as the Rise of the Empress duology, about a nobleman's daughter who must make amends to the would-be lover she cruelly rejected by freeing him of a witch's curse. The book was named a 2019 Junior Guild Library Selection, as well as one of Bank Street College of Education's Best Children's Books of the Year. Of the novel, Publishers Weekly said "Dao’s latest fuses beats of Cyrano de Bergerac with elements from her Rise of the Empress duology to create an East Asian–influenced tale of love, greed, politics, addiction, and found family," while School Library Journal predicted that "this will appeal to lovers of fairy-tale retellings and new fantasy worlds."

In October 2020, Dao released Broken Wish, the first in a quartet in which each book is written by a different YA author for Disney Books. The series explores an intricate curse that ties characters together across time and continents. Dao's novel centers on Elva, a young woman in the village of Hanau, who hides her powers and visions from the world. Yet, when she accidentally witnesses a horrifying vision of the future, she decides she must do everything she can to prevent it.

Beginning in 2022, Dao published her three-book action-adventure series for middle-grade readers, comprising Team Chu and the Battle of Blackwood Arena, Team Chu and the Epic Hero Quest, and Team Chu and the Wild Ghost Chase.

In October 2024, Dao published her first adult novel, Now Comes the Mist, a retelling of Bram Stoker's Dracula centered around Lucy Westenra, to be followed by the sequel, So Blooms the Dawn, in late 2025.

== Bibliography ==
=== Rise of the Empress Series ===
- Forest of a Thousand Lanterns (Philomel Books, 2017) ISBN 9781524738297
- Kingdom of the Blazing Phoenix (Philomel Books, 2018) ISBN 9781524738327
- Song of the Crimson Flower (Philomel Books, 2019) ISBN 9781524738358

=== Team Chu Series ===
- Team Chu and the Battle of Blackwood Arena (Farrar Straus Giroux Books for Young Readers, 2022) ISBN 1250805457
- Team Chu and the Epic Hero Quest (Farrar Straus Giroux Books for Young Readers, 2023) ISBN 0374388814
- Team Chu and the Wild Ghost Chase (Farrar Straus Giroux Books for Young Readers, 2024) ISBN 0374388857

=== The Mirror Series ===
- Broken Wish (Disney Hyperion, 2020) ISBN 978-1368046381

=== Now Comes the Mist Series ===
- Now Comes the Mist (Podium Entertainment, 2024) ISBN 1039457479
- So Blooms the Dawn (Podium Entertainment, 2025) ISBN 1039457495
