= Network for Locally Elected Women of Africa =

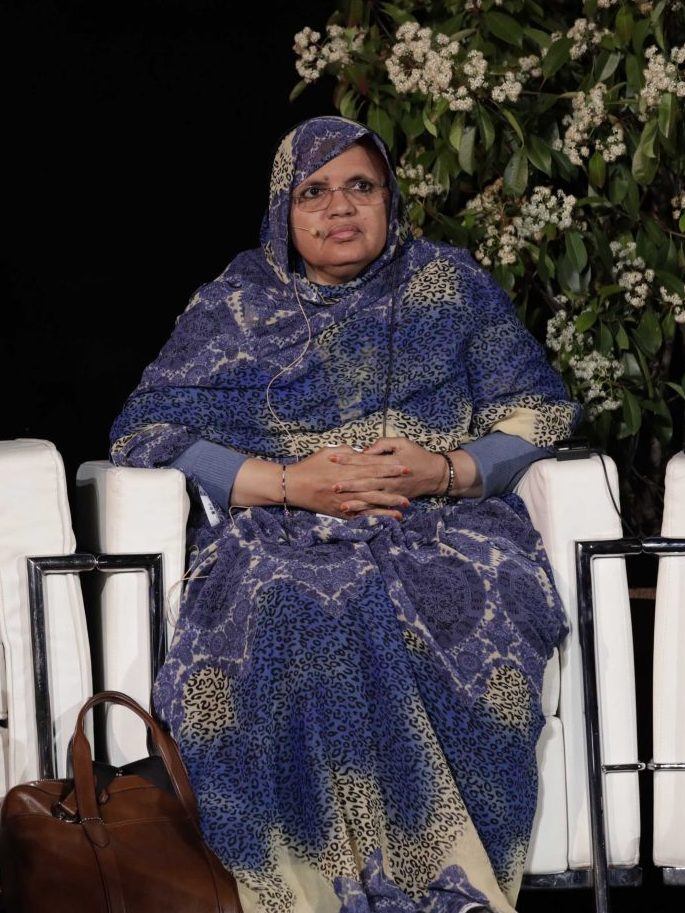
Former organization president, Fatimatou Abdel Malick

The Network for Locally Elected Women of Africa (Réseau des Femmes Elues Locales d'Afrique, REFELA) is a network of women elected local government officials in Africa. REFELA was founded in 2011.

== History ==
REFELA was founded at the first Forum of Locally Elected Women of Africa, held at Tangier in Morocco in March 2011.

From 2012 until December 2015 REFELA's president was Fatimatou Abdel Malick, Mayor of Tevragh-Zeina in Mauritania. In November 2015 the Cameroonian politician Célestine Ketcha Courtès was elected to succeed Abdel Malick as president. In 2019 Ketcha Courtès was succeeded as president by Macoura Dao, Mayor of Foumbolo in Ivory Coast. 2021 saw Rohey Malick Lowe, the Lord Mayor of Banjul City Council (BCC) / Gambia elected.
