= University of Dschang =

University in Cameroon

- Université de Dschang (French)
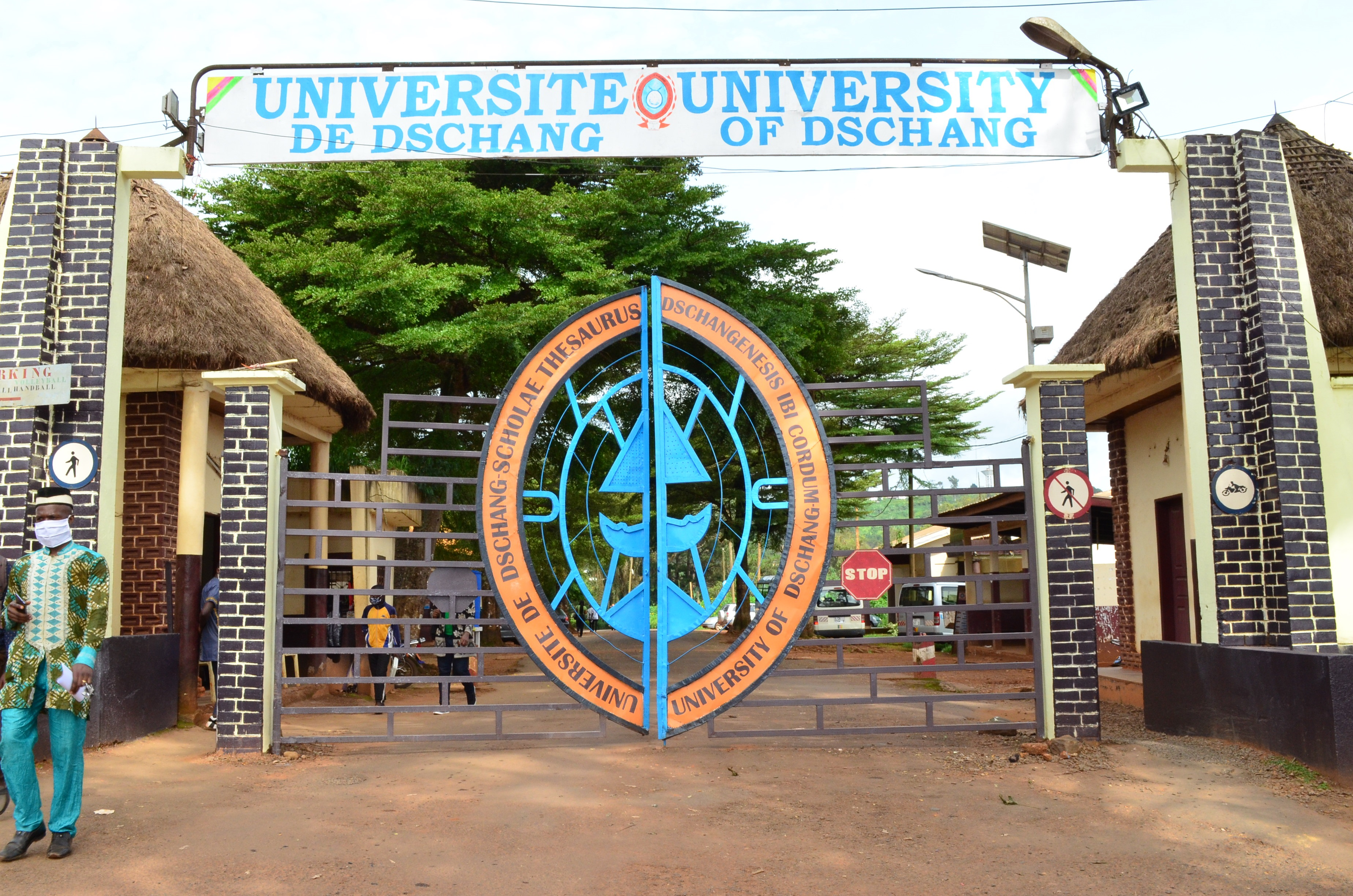
- Former name: University Centre (UCD) (1978-1993)
- Type: Public
- Established: 1993; 33 years ago
- Vice-Chancellor: Pépin Roger Tsafack Nanfosso
- Location: Dschang, West, Cameroon
- Campus: Dschang, Bandjoun, Foumban, Maroua, Bambui, Belabo, Ebolowa, Yaoundé
- Language: French, English
- Website: University website

The University of Dschang is located in the town of Dschang, West Cameroon, about 425 kilometers northwest of Yaoundé. It has its roots in three agricultural training schools, and evolved from an agricultural institution to a university in 1993.

In 1977, the Government of Cameroon authorized the creation of university centers at locations in Cameroon. The University Center at Dschang (UCD), was created by Presidential Decree No. 77/108 of April 28, 1977. In May 1978, ENSA (Ecole Nationale Supérieure Agronomique) in Yaounde and the Institute for Agricultural Technologies in Dschang were incorporated into the UCD. ENSA was to be transferred to Dschang as soon as possible. These two institutions were later merged into a single academic entity "The National Institute of Rural Development".

In 1979–80, the US government, in exchanges with the Cameroon government, decided to provide assistance to UCD. In 1981, the University of Florida was selected on a competitive basis to design that assistance, through what was named the Agricultural Education Project.

In 1993, the UCD was transformed into the University of Dschang.

== History ==
In 1979, the governments of Cameroon and the United States agreed to build a new academic institution in Cameroon. It was a time when the government of Cameroon had decided to place academic institutions in key corners of the country. Since there were already academic institutions in the commercial capital (Douala), the political capital (Yaoundé), in the north in Ngaundere, the new institutions were to be placed in the west (at Dschang) and in the south west (at Buea).

The US government committed US$44 million (a mix of a grant and a loan) to fund the Dschang project, and the Cameroon government made a contribution of about US$74 million that covered the salaries of Cameroonian staff and infrastructure. Belgium contributed about US$8 million. The US contribution was split between two independent programs, one on infrastructure and the other on academic programs and training. The contract for the former was subcontracted to a construction company from Senegal. The latter was awarded to the University of Florida (UF) in 1982, with a small sub-contract to the Florida A&M University. The UF team was led by Joe Busby who, in 1987, was succeeded by Charlie Eno who led the team until 1989, when he was succeeded by Peter Hartmann who ran the project until 1992.

The institute's Director General was Rene Owona. (Later when the institute became a university center, the Director General title was upgraded to that of Rector). By 1990, Owona was pulled out of the UCD and appointed Minister of Commerce. Upon his departure, Owona was replaced by Professor Jean Mfoulu who was transferred from the Ministry, where he was Director for Higher Education. His primary base was the University of Yaoundé, where he was a professor of sociology. Mfoulu held a PhD from Boston University.

Professor Jean Mfoulou was a transformational leader, observed Hartmann who was the leader of the University of Florida team in Dschang from 1984 to 1992. Mfoulou, who had studied in the Cameroon, French and American systems had a broad and in depth understanding of different higher education systems. He was highly respected by the Dschang faculty, many of whom had also studied at the University of Yaounde where Mfoulou was a professor.

Mfoulou regularly insisted on questioning the fundamentals of Dschang’s curriculum, research, and overall focus. He pointed out, for example, that the University of Yaounde was teaching its students about European philosophers when the country (Cameroon) could not feed all its people. He wanted Dschang to more closely address Cameroon’s need. This need, to better address the problems of Cameroon, had also been expressed by President Ahidjo in his trip to the USA to request the construction of a “land grant” type university in Cameroon.

=== Building the university in collaboration ===
There was a four-year delay on building construction, imposing serious strains on all program components – student housing, library, administrative facilities, and research facilities.

Another source of strain was the way the training of faculty was programmed. During the duration of the project, over fifty Cameroonian professionals received graduate training. Sending so many (almost half of UCD staff) for long-term studies put a huge burden on the remaining faculty and students. Only the strong collaborative spirit of the remaining faculty – American, Belgium, Cameroonian, and French - and the use to teaching assistants from external institutions saw UCD through the difficult time. Their overseas training completed, the returnees took up positions as faculty members.

=== Upgrade ===
By 1993, the UCD was upgraded to a full-fledged university and given the name, Dschang University. It has over 800 academic staff and 14,000 students.

== Organization ==
The University of Dschang is organized in five faculties and two institutes.

=== Faculties ===
- Faculté des Lettres et Sciences Humaines (Lettres and social science)
- Faculté des Sciences Economiques et de Gestion (economic science and business administration)
- Faculté des Sciences Juridiques et Politiques (law and political science)
- Faculté des Sciences (science)
- Faculté d'agronomie et des sciences agricoles (agronomy and agricultural science)
- Faculté de Médecine (medicine)

=== Institutes ===
- Institut des Beaux-Arts de Foumban
- Institut Universitaire de Technologie Fotso Victor de Bandjoun

=== Consecutive university leaders ===
| Period | Incumbent | Function |
|---|---|---|
| 2015- | Roger Tsafack Nanfosso | Rector |
| 2006-2015 | Anaclet Fomethe | Rector |
| 200x-2006 | Jean-Louis Dongmo | Rector |
| 2000-200x | Rémy Sylvestre Bouelet | Rector |
| 1998-2000 | Sammy Beban Chumbow | Rector |
| xxxx-1998 | Maurice Tchuente | Rector |
| 1993-xxxx | Samuel-Martin Eno Belinga | Rector |
| 1990-1992 | Jean Mfoulu | Director of UCD |
| 1984-1990 | René Owona | Director of UCD |
| 1978-1984 | Gibering Bol Alima | Director of UCD |

== Regional role ==
It soon became obvious that the institution was playing a regional role, particularly in training, but also in its research collaborations. Neighboring countries, like Chad and the Democratic Republic of Congo, were sending students to Dschang. It was increasingly involved in regional training and collaborative research with international agencies like IITA, ILRI (formerly ILCA), and ICIPE. Dschang's bilingual capacity is a major asset.

== Notable alumni ==
- Monique Ouli Ndongo, politician
