= Marcel Niat Njifenji =

Cameroonian politician (1934–2026)

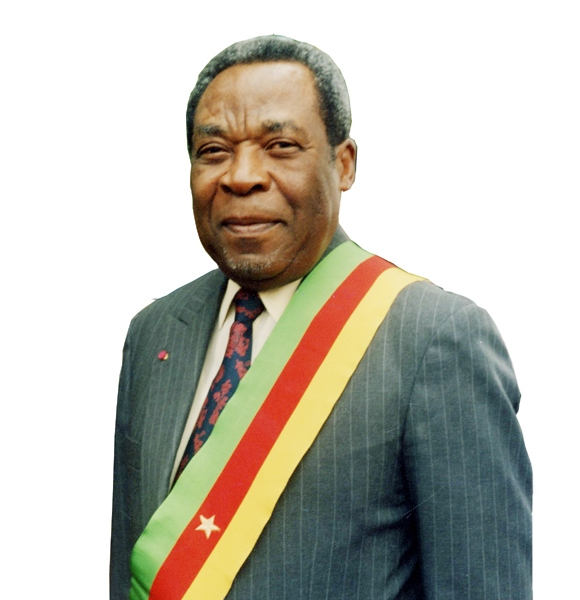
- Official portrait, 2013

President of the Senate of Cameroon
- In office 12 June 2013 – 17 March 2026
- President: Paul Biya
- Preceded by: Position established
- Succeeded by: Aboubakary Abdoulaye

Member of the Senate of Cameroon
- In office 8 May 2013 – 11 April 2026
- Constituency: West Region

Mayor of Bangangté
- In office 2002–2007
- Preceded by: Thomas Tchatchoua
- Succeeded by: Célestine Ketcha Courtès

Deputy Prime Minister for Mines, Water and Energy
- In office 9 April 1992 – 27 November 1992
- Prime Minister: Simon Achidi Achu
- Preceded by: Francis Nkwain
- Succeeded by: Jean Bosco Samgba

Minister of Planning and Regional Development
- In office 7 September 1990 – 26 April 1991
- President: Paul Biya
- Preceded by: Elisabeth Tankeu
- Succeeded by: Jean Tchouta Moussa

Personal details
- Born: Marcel Niat Njifenji; 26 October 1934 Bangangté, Nde, French Cameroon
- Died: 11 April 2026 (aged 91) Yaoundé, Cameroon
- Party: CPDM
- Spouse: Marcie Tchaptchet
- Children: 4
- Education: Supélec (BEng)

Marcel Niat Njifenji (26 October 1934 – 11 April 2026) was a Cameroonian politician who was President of the Senate of Cameroon from 2013 until 17 March 2026. A member of the ruling Cameroon People's Democratic Movement (RDPC), he had previously served for years as Director-General of the National Electricity Company, and he was also a minister in the government during the early 1990s.

== Life and career ==
Born on 26 October 1934 at Bangangté, located in Cameroon's West Region, Niat Njifenji worked as an engineer of roads and bridges. He was Director-General of the National Electricity Company (Société nationale d’électricité, SONEL), the state-owned electricity company, from 1974 to 1984. When rebellious soldiers attempted to overthrow President Paul Biya in an April 1984 coup attempt, Niat Njifenji was immediately arrested and jailed. Although it was considered doubtful that he had anything to do with the coup attempt, he was reportedly abused during his imprisonment and attempted suicide. He was released from prison in 1989 and promptly restored to his post at SONEL in September 1989.

Niat Njifenji also served in the government as Minister of Planning and Territorial Administration from 7 September 1990 to 26 April 1991, while remaining Director-General of SONEL. Subsequently, he was Deputy Prime Minister for Mines, Water, and Energy from 9 April 1992 to 27 November 1992. He was elected to the National Assembly in the 1992 parliamentary election, but he did not serve his term and remained in his post as Director-General of SONEL throughout the 1990s. Eventually the company was privatized, and Niat Njifenji was replaced by an AES Sirocco executive in July 2001. In 2002, Niat Njifenji was elected as Mayor of Bangangté; he served as Mayor until September 2007, when he was succeeded by Célestine Ketcha Courtès.

Niat Njifenji died in Yaoundé on 11 April 2026, at the age of 91.

=== President of the Senate ===
In 2013, after years of delay, the Senate was established to serve as the upper house of Cameroon's Parliament; previously only the National Assembly had existed. President Biya appointed Niat Njifenji to the Senate in May 2013. He was one of 30 senators to receive their seats by presidential appointment; the other 70 senators were indirectly elected. Biya appointed three senators for each region, and Niat Njifenji was one of the three to come from West Region.

Niat Njifenji was elected as President of the Senate on 12 June 2013. In the 100-member body, there were 86 votes in favour of Niat Njifenji; no senators voted against him, although 14 senators cast spoilt votes. As President of the Senate, Niat Njifenji would, according to the constitution, succeed President Biya if the latter were to die in office; he would lead the country until a new presidential election could be held, and he would not be permitted to stand as a candidate in that election. Niat Njifenji was re-elected on 22 March 2024 by 91 votes to 4 draws.
