= 1997 Cameroonian parliamentary election =

- 17 May 1997
- All 180 seats in the National Assembly; 90 seats needed for a majority
- Turnout: 76.78% (▲16.05pp)
| Party | Leader | Vote % | Seats | +/– |
|---|---|---|---|---|
| RDPC | Paul Biya | 48.46 | 109 | +21 |
| SDF | John Fru Ndi | 23.74 | 43 | New |
| UNDP | Maigari Bello Bouba | 13.59 | 13 | −55 |
| UPC | Henri Hogbe Nlend | 2.72 | 1 | −17 |
| UDC | Adamou Ndam Njoya | 2.65 | 5 | New |
| MDR | Dakolé Daïssala | 2.48 | 1 | −5 |
| MLJC | Dieudonné Tina | 0.45 | 1 | New |
This lists parties that won seats. See the complete results below.
| Prime Minister before | Prime Minister after |
|---|---|
| Peter Mafany Musonge; RDPC | Peter Mafany Musonge; RDPC |

Parliamentary elections were held in Cameroon on 17 May 1997. The ruling Cameroon People's Democratic Movement won 116 of the 180 seats, including seven constituencies through by-elections after the first results were cancelled by the Supreme Court due to serious irregularities.

== Results ==
| Party | Votes | % | Seats | +/– |
|---|---|---|---|---|
| Cameroon People's Democratic Movement | 1,399,751 | 48.46 | 109 | +21 |
| Social Democratic Front | 685,689 | 23.74 | 43 | New |
| National Union for Democracy and Progress | 392,712 | 13.59 | 13 | –55 |
| Union of the Peoples of Cameroon | 78,452 | 2.72 | 1 | –5 |
| Cameroon Democratic Union | 76,644 | 2.65 | 5 | New |
| Movement for the Defence of the Republic | 71,762 | 2.48 | 1 | –5 |
| National Alliance for Democracy and Progress | 25,658 | 0.89 | 0 | New |
| Union of Democratic Forces of Cameroon | 19,824 | 0.69 | 0 | New |
| Liberty Movement of Cameroon Youth | 12,973 | 0.45 | 1 | New |
| Cameroonian Party of Democrats | 3,460 | 0.12 | 0 | 0 |
| Other parties | 121,791 | 4.22 | 0 | – |
| Vacant (Note: The seven seats were later won by the Cameroon People's Democratic Movement in by-elections.) | | | 7 | – |
| Total | 2,888,716 | 100.00 | 180 | 0 |
| Valid votes | 2,888,716 | 97.86 | | |
| Invalid/blank votes | 63,137 | 2.14 | | |
| Total votes | 2,951,853 | 100.00 | | |
| Registered voters/turnout | 3,844,330 | 76.78 | | |
Source: African Elections Database, Nohlen et al. (excludes vote figures from three constituencies)
