= Order of Valour =

Order of knighthood of Cameroon

Order of Valour Ordre de la Valeur
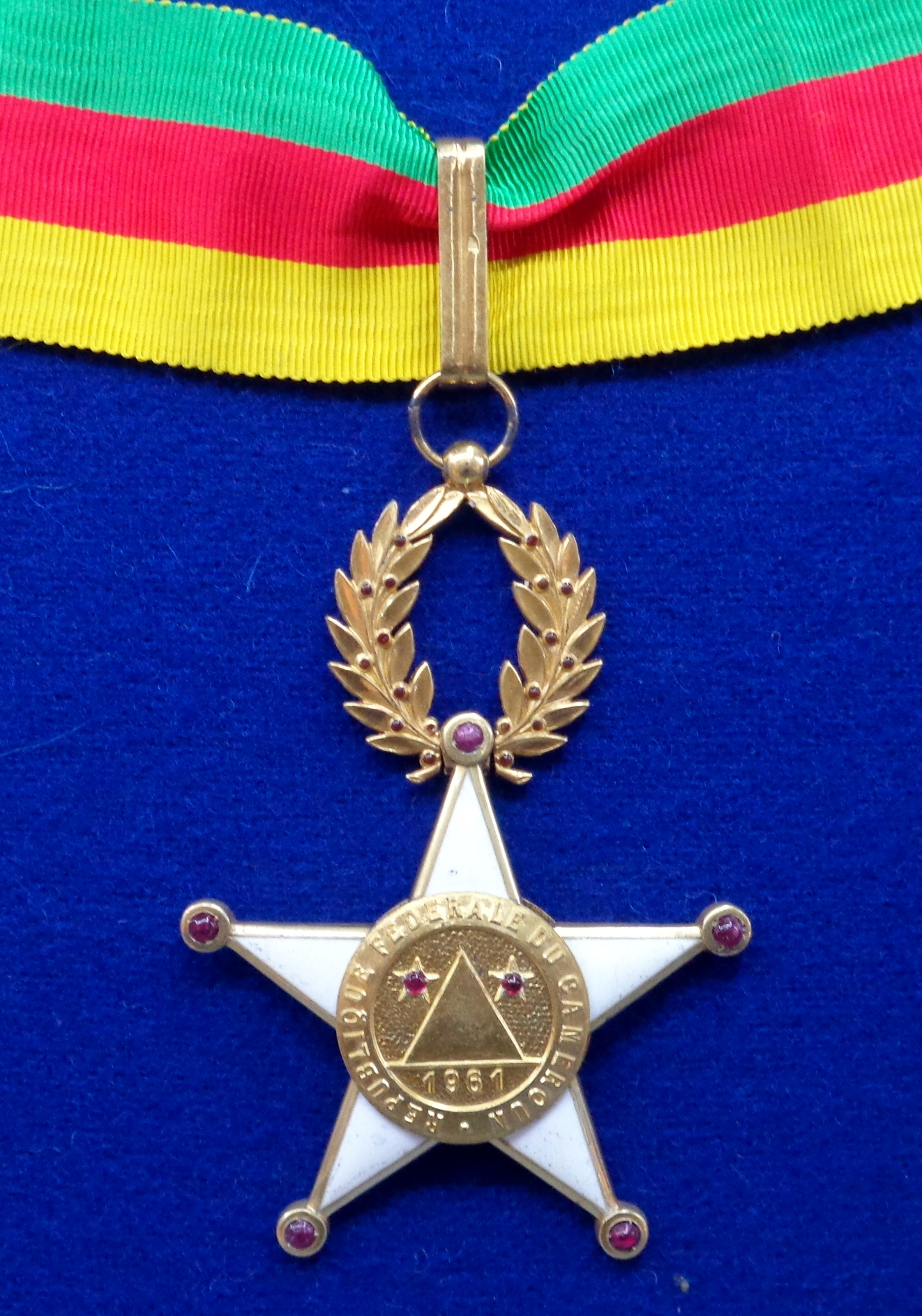
- First version (1961-1972)

Awarded by Cameroon
- Type: State order
- Established: 1961
- Awarded for: High services to the State
- Grand Master: President of Cameroon
- Classes: Grand Cordon; Grand Officer; Commander; Officer; Knight

Precedence
- Next (lower): Order of Merit
- Ribbon bar of the order

The Order of Valour is an order of knighthood of Cameroon.

== History ==
It is regulated by the ordinance N° 72/24 of 30 November 1972. It is one of the four orders of Cameroon:

- Order of Valour - 5 grades : GC, GO, Com, Off. and Knight
- Order of Merit - Grand Cordon, Commander, Officer, Knight
- Order of Agricultural Merit - Commander, Officer, Knight
- Order of Sports Merit - 1st Class, 2nd Class, 3rd Class

== Insignia ==
The ribbon of the order is red.

== Grades ==
The Order of Valour is subdivided into five grades of merit :

- Grand Cordon
- Grand Officer
- Commander
- Officer
- Knight

== See also ==
- Orders, decorations, and medals of Cameroon
