= 1992 Cameroonian parliamentary election =

- 1 March 1992
- All 180 seats in the National Assembly; 90 seats needed for a majority
- Turnout: 60.73% (▼29.59pp)
Party	Leader	Vote %	Seats	+/–
RDPC	Paul Biya	45.95	88	−92
UNDP	Bello Bouba Maigari	34.95	68	New
UPC	Henri Hogbe Nlend	8.87	18	New
MDR	Dakolé Daïssala	4.09	6	New
This lists parties that won seats. See the complete results below.
Prime Minister before	Prime Minister after
Sadou Hayatou; RDPC	Simon Achidi Achu; RDPC

Parliamentary elections were held in Cameroon on 1 March 1992. They were first multi-party elections for the National Assembly since 1964, although they were boycotted by the Social Democratic Front and the Cameroon Democratic Union. The result was a victory for the ruling (and formerly sole legal party) Cameroon People's Democratic Movement, which won 88 of the 180 seats. Voter turnout was 60.7%.

== Results ==
Party	Votes	%	Seats	+/–
Cameroon People's Democratic Movement	981,718	45.95	88	–92
National Union for Democracy and Progress	746,740	34.95	68	New
Union of the Peoples of Cameroon	189,534	8.87	18	New
Movement for the Defence of the Republic	87,440	4.09	6	New
Cameroonian Party of Democrats	37,131	1.74	0	New
National Party for Progress	17,094	0.80	0	New
People's Solidarity Party	15,908	0.74	0	New
Union of Republicans of Cameroon	10,248	0.48	0	New
Cameroonian People's Republican Party	7,930	0.37	0	New
Conservative Republican Party	4,809	0.23	0	New
Cameroonian Rally for the Republic	4,520	0.21	0	New
Rally for Patriotic Forces	4,213	0.20	0	New
Social Democratic Union	3,582	0.17	0	New
Social Union of Cameroon	3,579	0.17	0	New
Nationalism of the Pacifists of Cameroon	3,280	0.15	0	New
People's Action Party	2,952	0.14	0	New
Liberal Alliance Party	2,882	0.13	0	New
Regrouping of Nationalist Forces	2,504	0.12	0	New
PDVC	2,060	0.10	0	New
United Socialist Party	1,800	0.08	0	New
OROC	1,729	0.08	0	New
Party of Unified Workers of Cameroon	1,445	0.07	0	New
Cameroon Workers and Peasants Party	824	0.04	0	New
National Rally for Democracy and Development	772	0.04	0	New
Cameroon National Alliance	425	0.02	0	New
Cameroon National Party	387	0.02	0	New
Cameroon Social Democratic Association	228	0.01	0	New
Parti des Fourmis Devient	168	0.01	0	New
Cameroonian Benevolence Union	110	0.01	0	New
Others	656	0.03	0	–
Total	2,136,668	100.00	180	0
Valid votes	2,136,668	87.73		
Invalid/blank votes	298,898	12.27		
Total votes	2,435,566	100.00		
Registered voters/turnout	4,010,558	60.73		
Source: CLEA
