= Senate (Cameroon) =

Upper house of the Parliament of Cameroon

Senate Sénat
- 3rd Legislature

Type
- Type: Upper house

History
- Founded: 2013

Leadership
- President: Aboubakary Abdoulaye, CPDM since 17 March 2026

Structure
- Seats: 100 members (70 elected + 30 appointed)
- Political groups: CPDM (94); NUDP (1); CNSF (1); SDF (1); MDR (1); NADP (1); UPC (1)
- Length of term: 5 years

Elections
- Voting system: Indirect election (70 seats)
- First election: 14 April 2013
- Last election: 12 March 2023

Meeting place
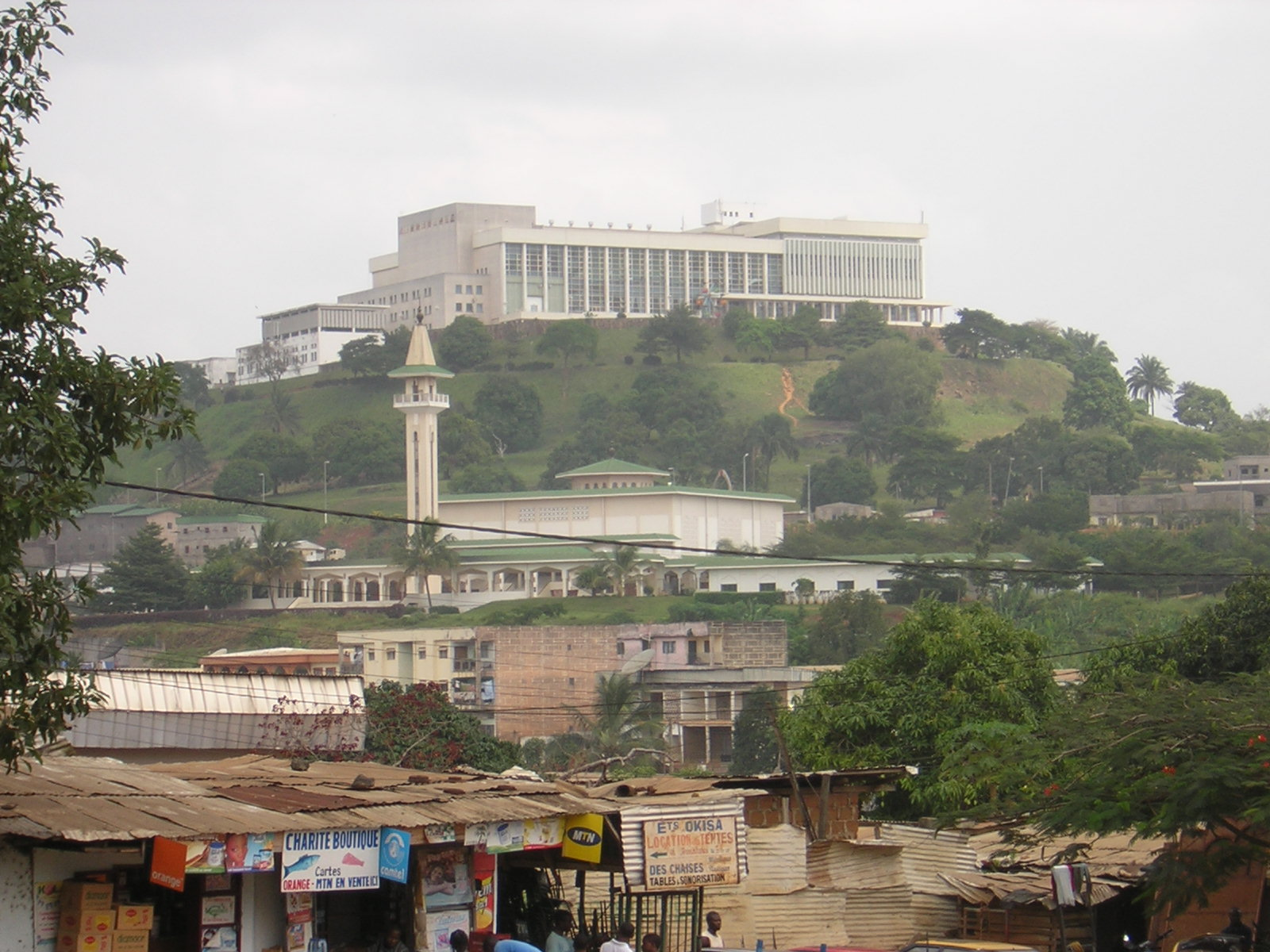
- Palace of Congress, Yaoundé

The Senate is the upper house of the Parliament of Cameroon. It consists of 100 members with 70 of them being elected and 30 being appointed by the President of Cameroon, divided among the ten regions of the country.

== History ==
The Senate was created in 1996 after an amendment to the constitution created the upper chamber. However, power to convene the Electoral College and call elections for the Senate remained with the President. President Paul Biya chose not to do so until he signed decree 2013/056 on 27 February 2013, which set 14 April as the election date.

== Electoral system ==
The Senate has 100 seats, of which 70 are elected and 30 appointed by the President, with each region having 10 Senators. The elected seats are elected by the 10,636 members of the 360 municipal councils.

Elections to the Senate were held for the first time on 14 April 2013. Marcel Niat Njifenji was elected as President of the Senate on 12 June 2013. The President of the Senate is the constitutionally designated successor to the President of the Republic in case of a vacancy in the latter office.

== Presidents of the Senate ==
Name	Entered office	Left office	Notes
Marcel Niat Njifenji	12 June 2013	17 March 2026	
Aboubakary Abdoulaye	17 March 2026	Incumbent	

== Current members of the Senate ==
The Senate consists of 70 members directly elected by their regions and 30 nominated by the President of Cameroon.

Region	Elected members	Appointed members
Adamawa	Aboubakar Siroma; Maikano Abdoulahi; Haman Paul; Maande Paul; Nguiebe Joël; Haoua Madeleine; Ahmadou Tidjiani	Baba Hamadou; Moussa Sabo; Mohaman Gabdo
Centre	Naah Ondoa Sylvestre; Mama Jean Marie; Anong Adibimé Pascal; Bell Luc René; Nicole Okala; Essomba Tsoungui Elie; Nnemdé Emmanuel	Nkodo Laurent; Ondoua Pius; Pongmoni Jean Marie
East	Salé Charles; Tokpanou Isabelle; Ouli Ndongo Monique; Ndanga Ndinga Badel; Amama Amama Benjamin; Moampea Marie Calire; Mboundjo Jean	Matta Joseph Roland; Zé Nguelé René; Aboui Marlyse
Far North	Abba Boukar; Alioum Alhadji Hamadou; Julienne Djakaou; Mahamat Abdoulkarim; Mme Zakiatou; Abdoulaye Wouyack Marava; Amrakaye Martin	Mahamat Bahar Marouf; Baskouda Jean Baptiste; Dakolé Daïssala
Littoral	Geneviève Tjoues; Tobbo Eyoum Thomas; Din Bell Armande; Mbassa Ndine Roger Victor; Kingué Simon; Ebongue Jean Jules; Kemayou Claude	Madiba Songue; Etame Massoma Siegfried; Ngayap Pierre Flambeau
North	Youssoufa Daoua; Namio Pierre; Mme Asta Yvonne; Ahmadou Alim; Amidou Maurice; Mme Adamou; Bebnone Payounni	Aboubakary Abdoulaye; Hayatou Aicha Pierrette; Hamadou Abbo
Northwest	Achidi Achu Simon; Wallang David Akwo; Dinga Ignatius; Mme Enoh Lafon; Wanlo John; Awanga Zacharie; Jikong Stephen Yerima	Fon Doh Gayonga III; Nkwain Francis; Fon Teiche Nje II
South	Medjo Delphine; Zang Oyono; Obam Assam; Mba Mba Grégoire; Eloumba Medjo Thérèse; Nnanga Ndoume; Mbita Mvaebeme Raymond	Ngalli Ngoa Pierre Henri; Menye Ondo François Xavier; Bisseck Paulette
Southwest	Tabe Tando Ndiep Nso; Ankie Affiong Rebecca Amah; Njifua Lucas Fontem; Matute Daniel; Mme Ntube Agnès Ndode; Otte Andrew Moffa; Mbella Moki Charles	Mafany Musonge Peter; Fun Mukete Essimi Ngo Victor; Chief Anja Simon Onjwo
West	Tsomelou Jean; Tantse Tagne Bernard; Tatchouang Paul; Metiedje Nguifo Tchetagne Delphine; Sonkin Etienne; Tchomnou Raoul; M. Nono	Sultan Ibrahim Mbombo Njoya; Honoré Djomo Kamga; Marcel Niat Njifenji
