= Cameroon War =

Cameroonian war of independence from France

Kamerun War
- Part of decolonisation of Africa
Date	1955–1964
Location	French Cameroon British Cameroon (later Cameroon)
Result	Independence of both French and British Cameroon; Reunification of the two Cameroons under Ahmadou Ahidjo and John Ngu Foncha; Establishment of the Federal Republic of Cameroon, which maintained close ties with France; Continued clashes until 1971

Belligerents
Independence War phase (1955–1960) France: French Cameroon; (France) French Equatorial Africa; United Kingdom: British Cameroon; Civil War phase (1960–1964); Cameroonian National Union: Cameroonian Union; (British Cameroon) Kamerun National Democratic Party; Union of the Peoples of Cameroon (legal UPC); France	Independence War phase (1955–1960): Union of the Peoples of Cameroon (UPC); One Kamerun (OK); Supported by: (Algeria) FLN; Albania; China; Soviet Union; (United Arab Republic) Egypt; Civil War phase (1960–1964); Union of the Peoples of Cameroon (Illegal UPC) Cameroonian Party of Democrats; Supported by: Algeria; ANC; China; Republic of the Congo; (United Arab Republic) Egypt; Ghana; Guinea; Albania; Soviet Union

Commanders and leaders
Edgar Faure; Pierre Mendes France; Gaston Defferre; Charles De Gaulle; Roland Pré; Pierre Messmer; Jean Ramadier; Xavier Antoine Torre; Max Briand; Louis Dio; Jean Lamberton (United Kingdom) John Owen Field; André-Marie Mbida (Until 1958); Ahmadou Ahidjo (British Cameroon) John Ngu Foncha; Théodore Mayi-Matip; Charles Assalé Vincent De Paul Ahanda; Simon Pierre Tchoungui	Ruben Um Nyobè †; Félix-Roland Moumié X Ernest Ouandié (executed); Abel Kingué; Martin Singap †; Tankeu Noé (executed); Osendé Afana † (British Cameroon) Ndeh Ntumazah; André-Marie Mbida (After 1960)

Units involved
- Armée de libération nationale Kamerounaise (ALNK) Allied militias; Cameroon Armed Forces (FAC) Allied militias; French Armed Forces

Strength
Unknown	8,000–40,000

Casualties and losses
Independence War phase: ~3,000 casualties (near-exclusively french) Civil War phase: : ~5,500 killed (France) : ~300 killed	Independence War phase: ~7,500 killed Civil War phase: ~20,000 killed
- Independence War phase: 75,000 dead (estimation) Civil War phase: 61,300–400,000 dead

The Cameroon War (Note: French: Guerre du Cameroun) (also known as the Hidden War, (Note: French: Guerre cachée), the Bamileke War, the Kamerun War, or the Cameroonian War of Independence) (Note: French: Guerre d'indépendance camerounaise) was a conflict in Cameroon between 1955 and 1964, initially as an independence struggle against French colonial rule, led by the Cameroonian Peoples Union (UPC), and then, after Cameroonian independence in 1960, as a civil war between the Cameroonian government and UPC rebels, later joined by André-Marie Mbida and his party, who opposed Ahmadou Ahidjo's single-party regime.

The conflict began with riots against French colonial rule in 1955 before becoming an insurgency. Following independence in 1960, the first President of Cameroon, Ahmadou Ahidjo requested continued French military assistance to fight the UPC rebels. The Cameroonian Armed Forces, assisted by the French Army, largely defeated the rebellion by 1964 though clashes continued until 1971.

Many people were killed in the conflict, mostly after independence during the civil war phase and in the Bamileke Region. Most estimates put the death toll in the range of tens of thousands, however other estimates reach hundreds of thousands. It has been described as a forgotten war because it occurred at the height of France's biggest colonial independence struggle, the Algerian War. The conflict continues to shape contemporary politics in Cameroon.

== Causes of war ==
Cameroon's own movement began in the early 1950s, after the founding of the Cameroon Peoples Union (UPC), Cameroon's first and most prominent nationalist party. The party was centered around two main goals: separating from France and establishing a socialist economy. The party was founded in 1948 by Ruben Um Nyobe and his colleague, Felix-Roland Moumie.

The burgeoning nationalist movement was met with the challenge of a colonial administration that wanted to neutralize it. In a letter that was written to the colonial high commission in 1954, Um Nyobe wrote:

“For six years, the Union of Cameroonian People has resisted and will continue to resist violent hostility from French colonial authorities. One must write a book to cover the inventory of forces and structures of power that were used to combat our organization”

Um Nyobe's words allude to the tensions that existed between the nationalist movement and the colonial administration. Attempts to thwart the nationalist movement were not unique to Cameroon, but rather a natural extension of French colonial politics at the time. The French colonial administration's efforts to suppress UPC led to a brutal civil war.

== Elites and the war ==
For many Cameroonian nationalists, embroiling oneself in the war was not an immediate inclination. In fact, many attempted to cooperate and participate democratically in the French colonial political system. Many of these were Cameroonians who had fully assimilated French law, language, and customs and were called évolués. They admired the French lifestyle and denigrated local mores. Yet, some of Cameroon's early revolutionaries would qualify as évolués.

Likewise, candidats administratifs were candidates that were favored by the colonial administrations. This practice was first introduced in Cameroon in 1945 when the colonial government was looking to create a class of proteges. During a provisional election, they placed Chief Andre Fouda against popular anti-colonialist Douala Manga Bell. The colonial administration favored Fouda and worked to ensure his victory.

== Um Nyobe's leadership ==
Even members of the UPC tried to participate in the French political process at first. During legislative elections in June 1951, Ruben Um Nyobe presented himself to electors. To hinder Um Nyobe's chances, the colonial administration waited until the last minute to accept Nyobe's candidacy. The administration also employed methods of voter suppression. Regions in which Nyobe's popularity was high, had few voting offices. This forced Nyobe's supporters to travel long distances just to cast their votes. Nyobe ended up losing the election, winning only 3,100 votes.

Frustrated by election results and other injustices plaguing the country, Nyobe took to the international stage. He defended three times (1952, 1953, and 1954) the cause of independent Cameroon before the General Assembly of the United Nations. In his speeches, Nyobe denounced French colonial rule and called for the unification of British and French Cameroon.

The UPC's growing popularity became a threat for the French, and left latitude for other conflicts.

== War chronology ==
On 22 April 1955, the UPC published the "Proclamation Commune," which at the time, was considered a unilateral independence manifesto. However, the colonial administration viewed it as an unnecessary provocation.

Slowly, the French began to focus their energies on quelling the UPC movement, by stifling its leaders and their supporters. By May 1955, Um Nyobe and his peers went into hiding.

On 22 May 1955, pro-independence riots broke out in Cameroon's major cities, Douala and Yaounde. These riots would continue on until 30 May 1955, when they were shut down by new French Colonial High Commissioner, Roland Pré. Following the riots, on 13 July 1955, French authorities officially banned the UPC. In the Sanaga-Maritime, the region of the country that contains the nation's largest cities Douala and Yaounde, the French Administration repressed these riots.

On 18 December 1956, the UPC began boycotting legislative elections. They enacted a "zone de maintien de l’ordre" at Sanaga-Maritime to squash nationalist upheaval. This designation gave the French the authority to exert any military force on Cameroonians living in Sanaga-Maritime. In retaliation, the UPC established an armed branch of their party called Organizational National Committee (CNO). From this moment, the war had officially begun.

As tensions heightened, the French quickly tried to retain order in the area. They brought in a lieutenant colonel, Jean Lamberton, from French Indochina to lead these efforts. From 9 December 1957, through 1958, Lamberton enacted what was known was the Cameroon Pacification Zone (ZoPac). In this zone, locals were placed into camps and surveilled by the colonial army. The culmination of this pacification program was Um Nyobe's assassination in September 1958.

As the anti-colonial struggle intensified, guerrilla attacks and security threats quickly spread into the British-administered side as well. UPC forces established maquis camps, organized a strategic liaison office in Kumba, and built a high-profile secretariat in Santa right along the border. These bases were not only used to smuggle heavy stockpiles of weapons from Bioko into French territory, but also to launch direct raids and armed operations inside the Kumba and Bamenda regions. Fearing that the growing cross-border violence and insurgent presence, the British government officially banned the UPC within British Cameroons in May 1957 and expelled its core leadership.

From 18 January 1957, to 25 May 1959, French authorities installed a similar martial zone in western regions of Cameroon. This region of the country is home to two of the nation's largest ethnic groups, the Bamileke and the Bassa. Localizing the conflict within the Bamileke region also served to quell the power of Bamileke elites. However, Bamileke and Bassa forces continually challenged the French rule.

In January 1959, the Cameroonian Liberation Army began fighting for Cameroon to become an independent nation. From this moment, the Cameroonians and the French were engaged in a fully fledged war.

On 1 January 1960, Cameroon gained independence, and Ahmadou Ahidjo became the nation's first President.

=== War Crimes ===
War crimes were carried out on a massive scale by the French military during the conflict. The French Army "frequently burned or otherwise completely destroyed entire villages infested with ''terrorists'', resulting in the killing of an unknown number of civilians.

After gaining independence in 1960, president Ahidjo signed a military assistance agreement with France. With French help, the Cameroonian army put down the widespread Bamileke revolts, including numerous atrocities such as massacres and destroying hundreds of villages. The military used of both heavy artillery and napalm to destroy villages. French forces decapitated and publicly displayed the heads Bamileke killed due to the Bamileke belief that the head stores the soul and should be enshrined and taken care of by their ancestors.

=== Casualties ===
Some modern estimates are that hundreds of thousands or even one million people died in the conflict but according to Canadian historian Meredith Terretta, these are not considered credible. Most estimates place the death toll in the range of tens of thousands. Neither the French administration nor the Cameroonian state kept accurate records of the number of people killed.

In 1964, the British embassy in Cameroon came up with an estimate of 61,300 to 76,300 civilian deaths in the conflict, 80% in the Bamileke Region. General Max Briand, commander of French Expeditionary Corps in Cameroon, reported to his superiors that 20,000 people were killed in 1960 alone.

Historian Bernard Droz writes that around 10,000 died during the period before independence from 1955 to 1959. According French historian Marc Michel, it's likely that several tens of thousands of people died, mostly during the civil war phase after independence. According to Cameroonian lawyer Julie Owono, between 100,000 and 400,000 people were killed between 1959 and 1964.

== Memorial ==
On 21 January 2025, a report composed by Cameroonian and French researchers on French colonization in Cameroon was submitted to French president Emmanuel Macron, and also to Camerronian president Paul Biya on 28 January. On 12 August 2025, a letter from Macron to Biya was released showing in which the French government officially acknowledged its actions against the Cameroonian independence movement from 1945 to 1971 as a war.

== Related links ==
- History of Cameroon
- Union of the Peoples of Cameroon
- Algerian War
- Bamileke people
- Bassa
- Félix-Roland Moumié
- Ruben Um Nyobé
