= Ndeh Ntumazah =

Cameroonian political leader and activist

- Born: 1926; Mankon, Bamenda, British Cameroon
- Died: 21 January 2010 (aged 83–84); London, United Kingdom
- Known for: UPC leader

Ndeh Ntumazah (1926 - 21 January 2010) was a leader of the pro-independence movement in Cameroon in the 1950s. He was forced into exile, and was unable to return to his country until 1991, when he returned to the political fray. After his death he was honoured by an official burial.

== Early career ==
Ndeh Ntumazah was born in Mankon, Bamenda in 1926. He joined the Union of the Peoples of Cameroon (UPC) in the early 1950s. In 1955 the UPC was banned in the French-controlled Eastern Cameroon. Ntumazah then founded the One Kamerun movement in the British-controlled Southern Cameroons, with himself as president, a disguised version of the UPC. From this temporarily secure base he assisted UPC militants such as Ruben Um Nyobé and Ernest Ouandié who conducted guerrilla warfare in the French-controlled zone.

== Life in exile ==
The two Cameroons were unified in 1961. In 1962 Ntumazah slipped out of Cameroon and moved to Accra, Ghana. On 6 September 1962 the UPC leadership in exile met in Accra at Ndeh Ntumazah's house, and decided to exclude the "criminal clique of Woungly" from the administrative secretariat. At ten that evening, when the attendees were about to leave, a bomb exploded without causing any injury. The Ghana authorities were not amused and threw the entire UPC leadership in jail. In October they freed Massaga, Tchaptchet and Ntumazah, but kept Abel Kingué in prison.

On 13 September 1962 the UPC organised its first Assemblée populaire sous maquis in Mungo, where the Revolutionary Committee was named. The committee was presided over by Ernest Ouandié. Other members were Abel Kingué, Michel Ndoh, Ndongo Diyé, Osendé Afana, Nicanor Njiawe and Woungly-Massaga. A two-headed leadership was theoretically in place, with Abel Kingué leading the exiles from Ghana and Ernest Ouandié in the maquis. The organisation functioned poorly due to communication problems and also to the Sino-Soviet split. The next year it split, with Abel Kingué and Osendé Afana allied with Ntumazah and opposed to the other leaders.

Ntumazah lived in political exile in Ghana, Guinea and Algeria before settling in the United Kingdom. During his time of exile he continued to try to make the West pay attention to what was going on in Cameroon.

== Later years ==
With the re-introduction of multi-party democracy in 1991, Ntumazah returned to Cameroon and reentered politics as one of the leaders of the reborn UPC, still a radical. The UPC was divided by internal disagreements during the 1990s. Augustin Frédéric Kodock's moderate faction, which was allied to the RDPC, emerged from the intraparty struggles as the dominant faction, although it was opposed by the party's more radical members. In 1996, the UPC split into different factions, one of which was led by Kodock and another by Ndeh Ntumazah. Kodock's faction held a congress at Makak in 1996, at which he was re-elected as secretary-general. Kodock was also re-elected to the National Assembly from Nyong-et-Kelle constituency in the 1997 parliamentary election.

Ndeh Ntumazah died in St. Thomas's Hospital in London, United Kingdom, on 21 January 2010. President Paul Biya decreed that his body should be brought back to Cameroon and would receive an official burial in Bamenda.

== Bibliography ==
- Ntumazah, Ndeh (2011-05-15). Asong, Linus; Chi, Simon Ndeh (eds.). Ndeh Ntumazah: A Conversational Auto Biography. African Books Collective. ISBN 978-9956-579-32-7.
