= Bassa people (Cameroon) =

Ethnic group

Bassa
Bassa
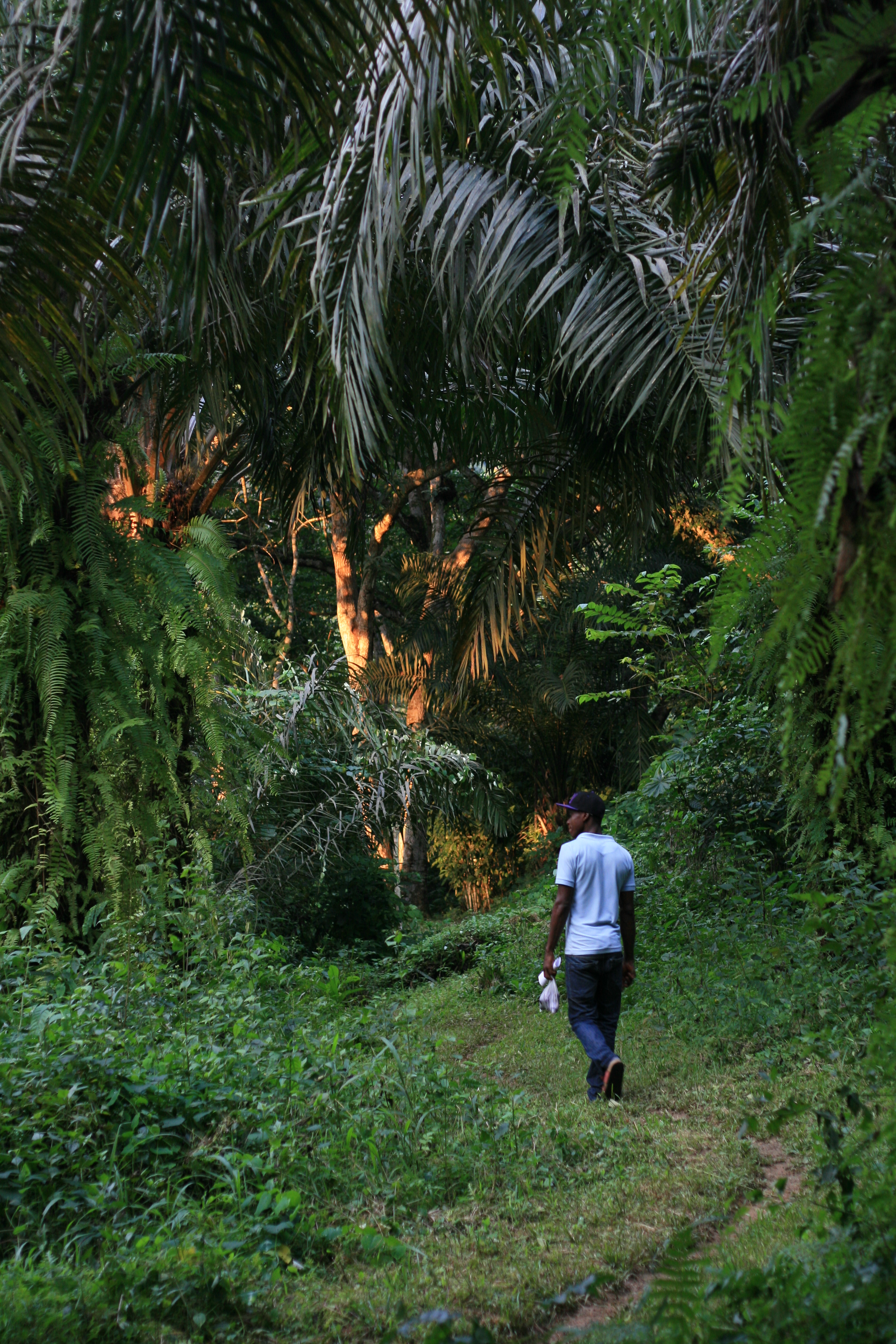

Languages
- Basaa language

Religion
- Catholic

Related ethnic groups
- Bantu peoples

The Bassa (also spelled Basa or Basaa and sometimes known as Bassa-Bakongo) are a Bantu ethnic group in Cameroon. They number approximately 800,000 individuals. The Bassa speak the Basaa language.

== Ethnonym ==
Depending on the sources, there are multiple variations of the ethnonym, including Basaa, Bassa, Betjek, and Bikyek.

The term Bassa is the plural of nsa which can be translated as sharing or remuneration. Legend has it that an argument took place between the sons of a common Bassa ancestor called Mban. This dispute concerned the sharing of a game after returning from hunting to the village, it was a snake. At the end of this dispute, the protagonists were nicknamed Bassa, which translates as “the kidnappers”. However, the oldest term Bassa comes from Egypt under the term Umm Usuda. Subsequently, Portuguese texts subsequent to this period use the terms Mascha, Easha, Biafra, Biafaré to designate the Bassa.

== History ==
For centuries, the Bassa lived along the Atlantic coast of what is now Cameroon. They lived off subsistence farming and fishing.

The Bassa were displaced by Duala and early European traders, suffering exploitation and marginalization during the era of German Kamerun. Their fishing and farming efforts shrunk. During this German era, most Bassa were anti-colonialists, fighting against German expansion beyond the coast. However, they suffered a major defeat and were subjected to forced labor in the construction of the Douala–Yaoundé "Mittel Kamerun" railway.

Throughout the era of European colonial presence, the Bassa were able to take advantage of Christian missionaries to attain a Western-style education, particularly from German Protestants and American Presbyterians.

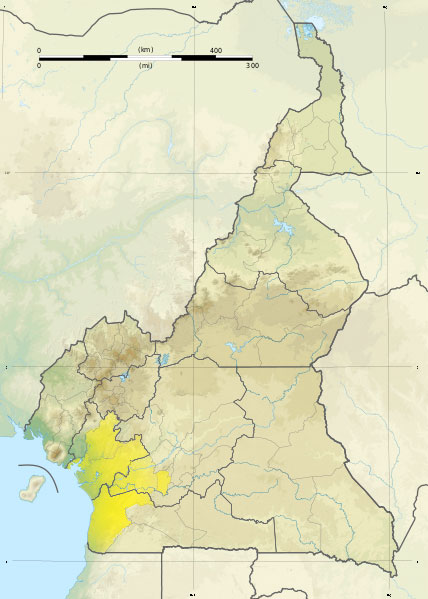
Map showing distribution of Bassa people in Cameroon.

The Bassa played a lead role during decolonization, and the Bassa-Bakongo region was a hotbed of radical anti-colonial nationalism, particularly the Union des Populations du Cameroun (UPC). However, the Bassa brand of anti-colonialism ultimately lost out during the creation of the postcolonial nation of Cameroon.

Migration

The Bassa designate their oldest history under the name of “legends and myths”: Mbog kôba ni kwân. Griots define three major periods in the history of the Bassa. The first major period is called Kwan (period from the beginning until the 19th century BC), the second period is Kôba (period of legends from the 19th century BC to the 15th century), and the last period is Len (period from the 15th century to the present day).

From Egypt to the shores of Lake Chad

Oral tradition places the origins of the Bassa people in Ancient Egypt or in Ancient Nubia, on the border of Egypt and Sudan, near the Nile. After several invasions (Pharaonic, Ethiopian and Arab) of Nubia, and natural disasters such as floods, the Bassa moved as far as possible from the Nile by crossing the Sahara Desert to descend towards the southwest. They then gradually established themselves in Kanem Bornu where they occupied the Logone Valley on the high plateaus of Adamawa. Then, they follow the Logone River to take refuge in Guelingdeng before hiding in the Mandara Mountains between present-day Cameroon, Nigeria, and Chad, which recall the landscapes of Nubia. But the Arab conquests dislodged them and stripped them of their treasures. During this migration, they interact with other ethnic groups, leading to Bassa people today being found in Benin, Gambia, Kenya, Liberia, the Democratic Republic of Congo, Senegal, and South Africa.

From Lake Chad to Ngog Lituba

The western highlands discharge their waters towards the Nile, Congo, and Niger basins. The Bassa people will follow these routes. Leaving central Cameroon, the Bassa descend towards the southwest into forest areas less accessible to conquering peoples. Faithful to their logic of staying near the waterways, they follow a tributary of the Sanaga, the Liwa, and find themselves on the right bank at a place they called Ngog Lituba.

From Ngog Lituba to the banks of the Wouri River

The Bassa identify themselves in their entirety as being the descendants of those who inhabited Ngog Lituba, this being one of their founding myths: Bon ba ngok lituba (“the children of the pierced rock”). On the eve of the 15th century, Ngog Lituba became too small for the Bassa people and the need for more space grew urgent. The breakdown of the families named below is the subject of several versions. For some, this is the consequence of disagreements between these families, which would have led some to exile, and, for others, it is the logical continuation of their long walk to the banks of the Wouri. Some settled in the lower Sanaga valley, these are the Yabakalag, the Balimba, the Yassoukoum, and the Pongo. Other families crossed the Sanaga in several places, this was the case of the Bikôk, the Ndôg Njee, the Eséka, the Dôk Béa of Makak, the Ngase of Edéa, the Yabi, and the Bakoko; others went deeper into the forests of Yabassi and Haut Nkam. Those who settled on both banks of the Nkam River were the Ewodi, the Bodiman, and part of the Bakoko. Other clans migrated further to reach the posts of Mbanga and Nkongsamba, these were the Abo and the Mbo. Among the families who remained in Ngog Lituba include the Bambimbi and the Basso Ba Likol. The migrations will end with the barrier of the Atlantic Ocean and the arrival of Europeans. Installed in this coastal area, the Bassa will continue their usual activities of farmers, fishermen and hunters, maintaining intense commercial activity with the Malimba, Duala and Bakoko.

Contact with Europeans [1472 - 1960]

The Portuguese influence between 1472 and 1578 did not directly concern the Bassa people, who nevertheless owed them the introduction of certain American fruits coming from Sao Tome and Fernando Po, notably the avocado, the papaya, cocoa, and sugar cane. These plant species will much later bring wealth to the Bassa in general and to Cameroon as a whole. The Dutch and the English were content to trade along the west coast of Africa without having a deep influence on the Bassa people. The first known resistance began with the arrival of the Germans in 1884. Major Hans Dominik describes them as a people of resistance, who lost several of their men during the Battle of Kan, in current Sanaga Maritime, during the period from 1885 to 1907. Its most important chiefs during the Germanic era were notably: Mahop ma Mbom, Ikong Yap, Kumaya, Ngwem, Balema, Bimaï, Toko Ngango, Mbome Pep, Hiak Nkonga, Bitjoka bi Tum, Matip ma Ndombol, Mayi ma Mbem, Nkot Mayo, Matip ma Matip, Eone Eone, Undu Ngwem, Ntep Nak, Mangele ma Yogo, Mbey Mang Gwade, Njiki Njok, Baleng ba Mpode, Yomb Kamnjok, Bajang ba Honba, Mangele ma Balegel, Mbinak Binon, Nduga Bitak, and Yamb Kamen. However, the Germans, after having pacified their relationship with the natives, undertook numerous projects mainly relating to the cultivation of cocoa, creating several centers in the villages of Makak, Eséka, Longone, Nkan, Omeng, and Nyambat. The Germans also built a railway line which stopped at Njok. The French period began in 1919 under the policy of indigénat (forced labor), which had begun under the Germans. The French opened an administrative post in Bassa territory at Ngambe in the locality of Bambibi in 1927. During the Second World War, many Bassa enlisted with the French to fight the German armies. Back home, and due to ideas received in Europe during the Second World War, the Bassa united with other natives to form independence movements. The best known of the Bassa separatists is called Ruben Um Nyobe. Cameroon obtained its independence on January 1, 1960.

== Contemporary culture and politics ==
Despite their marginalization in the postcolonial state, there remains a belief in a "Nka kunde" or national liberation that has yet to occur.

=== Language and communication ===
The Bassa people are primarily speakers of the Bassa language, which belongs to the Bantu language family. Their language serves as a vehicle for preserving their cultural heritage, oral traditions, and storytelling. Elders play a crucial role in passing down the wisdom and history of the Bassa people through oral narratives.

=== Traditional beliefs and religion ===
The Bassa people have a strong connection to their ancestral spirits and believe in a spiritual world that coexists with the physical realm. Ancestor worship, animism, and traditional rituals are integral to their religious practices. The Bassa people also revere nature and maintain a close relationship with the environment, which is reflected in their agricultural and hunting customs.

=== Art and craftsmanship ===
Artistry is deeply ingrained in Bassa culture. Skilled artisans create intricate wooden carvings, masks, and sculptures that are not only aesthetically stunning but also hold significant cultural and spiritual meaning. These art forms are used in various ceremonies, including initiation rites and funerals.

=== Music and dance ===
Music and dance play a vital role in Bassa society, serving as expressions of joy, grief, and celebration. The Bassa people use various traditional instruments, such as drums, xylophones, and flutes, to accompany their dances, which are characterized by rhythmic movements and colorful costumes. There are two broad categories of music: Urban (Assiko, N'gola and Ma-Kune) and rural styles.

== Language ==
Like most languages when confronted with other cultures, the Bassa language has incorporated certain borrow words and evolved over time. We distinguish four periods of its evolution, Bassa spoken before 1472, Bassa spoken between 1472 and 1919, Bassa spoken between 1919 and 1945, and Bassa spoken today.

The Basaá (or Bassa) language belongs to the group of Bantu languages. It is spoken by around 800,000 people around the towns of Édéa, Éséka and Douala. It has phonetic and grammatical characteristics common to many Bantu languages, such as noun classes, the implosive “b” and a tone system: high tone, low tone, low-high tone, high-low tone, medium tone. The language is transcribed using an adapted Latin alphabet, including consonants, vowels and accents specific to Bantu languages.

== Culinary specialties ==
Various products imported since 1472 are part of the daily consumption of the Bassa including rum and salt.

Some well-known Cameroonian dishes originate from Bassa country, including Bongo'o sauce and Mintoumba.

Mintoumba is a cassava bread made from kneaded cassava and mixed with palm oil, salt, spices and chili pepper, all rolled and tied in a banana leaf.

== Notable individuals ==
- Ruben Um Nyobe, politician, leader of the UPC, the Cameroonian nationalist movement, before independence.
- Bassek Ba Kobhio: writer and filmmaker.
- Nathalie Yamb: journalist‚ communicator‚ anti-colonialist‚ anti-imperialist and pan-Africanist activist.
- Bruno Ntep: Taekwondo practitioner (European Champion).
- Roger Milla: (born 1952), football player.
- Joseph Antoine Bell: (born 1954), football player.
- Emmanuel Kundé: (born 1956), football player.
- François Omam-Biyik: (born 1966), football player.
- Rigobert Song: (born 1976), football player.
- Jean Alain Boumsong: (born 1979), football player.
- Samuel Eto'o: (born 1981), football player.
- Jean II Makoun: (born 1983), football player.
- Joël Matip: (born 1991), football player.
- Samuel Umtiti: (born 1993), football player.
- Kylian Mbappé : (born 1998), French football player.
- Carlos Baleba (born 2004), football player.
- Emile Ntamack: rugby player.
- Nicolas Batum: National Basketball Association (NBA) player.
- Joel Embiid: National Basketball Association (NBA) player, Most Valuable Player (MVP) of the 2023 regular season.
- Blick Bassy, (born 1974), singer-songwriter.
- Werewere Liking (born 1950), writer, playwright and performer.
- Achille Mbembe (born 1957), philosopher, political theorist and public intellectual.
