= December 1946 Cameroonian General Council election =

- 22 December 1946
- Turnout: 52.16%

General Council elections were held in French Cameroons on 22 December 1946.

== Electoral system ==
At the time of the election, the General Council had 40 seats, of which 16 were elected by the first college and 24 were elected by the second college.

== Campaign ==
Only around 40 candidates contested the 40 seats.

== Results ==
Of the 2,611 voters in the first college, 1,201 cast votes, whilst in the second college, 20,490 of the 38,976 registered voters voted.
