= 1952 Cameroonian Territorial Assembly election =

Territorial Assembly elections were held in French Cameroons on 30 March 1952.

== Electoral system ==
At the time of the election, the Territorial Assembly had 50 seats, of which 18 were elected by the first college and 32 were elected by the second college.

== Campaign ==
A total of 303 candidates ran for the 50 seats; 65 candidates contested the 18 seats in the first college and 238 candidates contested the 32 seats in the second college.

== Results ==
Of the 7,788 voters in the first college, 4,300 cast votes, whilst in the second college, 330,000 of the 520,605 registered voters voted.
