= Augustin Frédéric Kodock =

Cameroonian politician

- Born: 1 March 1933
- Died: 24 October 2011 (aged 78)
- Citizenship: Cameroon
- Occupation: Politician
- Title: Secretary General
- Political party: UPC

Augustin Frédéric Kodock (March 1, 1933 – October 24, 2011) was a Cameroonian politician who was Secretary-General of the Union of the Peoples of Cameroon (UPC-K faction) from 1991 to 2011. He worked in Cameroon's state administration during the 1960s and then worked at the African Development Bank through the 1970s. After a stint as head of Cameroon Airlines in the mid-1980s, he participated in the beginnings of multiparty politics in the early 1990s, becoming Secretary-General of the UPC. Allying himself with President Paul Biya, he was appointed to the government as Minister of State for Planning and Regional Development from 1992 to 1994 and then as Minister of State for Agriculture from 1994 to 1997. Subsequently, he was again Minister of State for Agriculture from 2002 to 2004 and Minister of State for Planning from 2004 to 2007.

== Background and administrative career ==
Kodock was born at Mom village in the Makak District of Nyong-et-Kellé Department, located in the Centre Province of Cameroon, in 1933. Following independence in 1960, he became Deputy Director of Economic Affairs at the Ministry of Finance in 1961; he was then posted in Douala for about six months as Director of External Economic Relations and subsequently was Director of Economic Orientation. He also coordinated the preparation of Cameroon's first five-year plan, and from 1963 to 1965 he served in the government as Secretary of State for Finance; he was then appointed as Director of Litigation and Studies at the Ministry of Territorial Administration in 1965. Later, he worked at the African Development Bank from 1968 to 1980 and was appointed as Technical Adviser to Cameroon's Ministry of Finance in 1982. He was President Director-General of Cameroon Airlines (CAMAIR) from May 1984 to September 1985, and he participated in the founding congress of the Cameroon People's Democratic Movement (RDPC), held in Bamenda in 1985, as a member of its Transport Commission.

== Political career during the 1990s ==
In 1991, Kodock was elected as Secretary-General of the Union of the Peoples of Cameroon (UPC) at its Nkongsamba congress, and in the March 1992 parliamentary election he was elected to the National Assembly as a UPC candidate in Nyong-et-Kelle constituency. In the National Assembly, he became President of the UPC Parliamentary Group.

President Paul Biya, who was facing strong opposition in 1992, sought to improve his position by dividing and weakening the opposition. Two weeks before the 11 October 1992 presidential election, the UPC Parliamentary Group signed an agreement to support Biya on 28 September 1992. Kodock's decision to support Biya was an important development, as it gave Biya a political boost at a crucial moment and buttressed his precarious parliamentary majority. By drawing Kodock over to his side, Biya may have also hoped to fuel factionalism within the UPC and thereby weaken the party as a political force. Ultimately, Biya narrowly won the presidential election with a plurality of the vote, according to the controversial official results; subsequently he appointed Kodock to the government as Minister of State for Planning and Regional Development on 27 November 1992.

As Secretary-General of the UPC, Kodock was a firm supporter of the unitary state, which was created by President Ahmadou Ahidjo in 1972; he believed that national unity, facilitated by a strong central government, was crucial to the development of Cameroon. He denounced the notion of federalism, which was favored by some Anglophone Cameroonians; in 1993, he said that "linguistic fractioning brought about by colonisation cannot determine the future course of our country. The return of Anglophone Cameroon and the unification are the greatest achievements of Cameroon since independence." At around the same time, he filed a defamation suit against staff at two newspapers, La Nouvelle Expression and Galaxie, for reporting that an official at his ministry was embezzling money. Continuing to serve in the government, he was moved to the position of Minister of State for Agriculture on July 21, 1994.

The UPC was divided by internal disagreements during the 1990s. Kodock's moderate faction, which was allied to the RDPC, emerged from the intraparty struggles as the dominant faction, although it was opposed by the party's more radical members. In 1996, the UPC split into different factions, one of which was led by Kodock and another by Ndeh Ntumazah. Kodock's faction held a congress at Makak in 1996, at which he was re-elected as secretary-general. He was also re-elected to the National Assembly from Nyong-et-Kelle constituency in the 1997 parliamentary election and was the only UPC candidate to win a seat. After the election, he was excluded from the government that was formed on December 7, 1997, in which a rival UPC leader, Henri Hogbé Nlend, was named Minister of Scientific Research.

== Return to the government ==
On January 13, 2001, Kodock and various other party leaders participated in an unauthorized protest in Yaoundé against the National Election Observatory, believing that it would not be an impartial body. The protest was dispersed by security forces, and Kodock, along with the other party leaders, was detained for five hours. According to Kodock, the Observatory's neutrality was doubtful because its members were all appointed by President Biya.

In the June 2002 parliamentary election, Kodock was again re-elected to the National Assembly from Nyong-et-Kelle constituency; the UPC list of three candidates in Nyong-et-Kelle received a narrow majority over the RDPC, with 50.80% of the vote. Following the election, Kodock briefly presided over the National Assembly prior to the election of its bureau due to his status as the oldest member of the National Assembly at age 69. He was then appointed as Minister of State for Agriculture in the government named on August 24, 2002, thus returning to the government after five years of absence from it. He and the UPC-K supported Biya in the October 2004 presidential election, citing Biya's accomplishments as President. After that election, he was moved to the position of Minister of State for Planning in the government named on December 8, 2004.

Speaking at a conference in Limbe on 1 September 2006, Kodock discussed the lack of economic development in Cameroon. He described a visit to South Korea; according to Kodock, South Korea and Cameroon had similar GDPs in the 1960s, but South Korea had since then made vast strides, developing a prosperous and modern economy, while Cameroon, still deeply impoverished, was no longer even remotely comparable. He stressed the importance of unity and cooperation among Cameroonians and the need for "a new spirit to build this country". Recalling that the UPC had been founded with three goals—independence, national unity, and the achievement of a high standard of living—Kodock noted that the last of those goals was still distant, while emphasizing the importance of national unity in achieving it. He also bemoaned Cameroon's reliance on imports and its failure to take advantage of its own resources, and he said that Cameroon needed to find the will to develop its economy.

At a workshop held to assess progress towards meeting the Millennium Development Goals on December 5–7, 2006, Kodock said that he saw no real hope that Cameroon could meet the goals by 2015. He was re-elected as Secretary-General of the UPC-Kodock faction at a congress on December 30–31, 2006; he also gained stronger powers at the congress.

== Political activities after 2006 ==
Kodock ran again as a UPC candidate for re-election to the National Assembly in the July 2007 parliamentary election, saying that he believed it was important that a minister in the government obtain popular legitimacy through election to a parliamentary seat. However, Kodock was defeated according to initial results. He filed a request for the election in his district, Nyong-et-Kelle (which he described as his party's "natural stronghold"), to be cancelled, alleging fraud on the part of RDPC candidates. In August, the Supreme Court accordingly cancelled the election in Nyong-et-Kelle, giving Kodock another opportunity to win the seat when the election was held again.

Kodock remained Minister of State for Planning until he was dismissed from the government in a cabinet reshuffle on September 7, 2007. Kodock then denounced Biya for allegedly killing democracy. It was believed that Kodock was excluded from the government because his support had fallen to such a level that it was no longer politically useful to include him; his age may have also been a factor (he was then 74 years old). In the re-vote held in Nyong-et-Kelle on September 30, the UPC list headed by Kodock was defeated by the RDPC list, receiving about 40% of the vote against 55% for the RDPC, according to provisional results. UPC factionalism was considered a factor contributing to the defeat, with Kodock's rival Henri Hogbé Nlend calling for people to vote for the RDPC; additionally, some in the UPC reportedly declined to vote for Kodock because they felt it was time for new leadership in the party. Kodock appealed to the Supreme Court for the RDPC list to be disqualified and for the revote to be annulled, but the Supreme Court rejected his request on October 10.

Kodock criticized the National Elections Observatory's generally positive report on the 2007 election, which was published on July 31, 2008; according to Kodock, the election in Nyong-et-Kelle had been blatantly rigged through vote-buying, intimidation, and violence.

Although summoned to appear before State Counsel at the Mfoudi High Court on June 17, 2008, as part of an investigation regarding embezzlement of public funds, Kodock refused to appear, denouncing the investigation as a smear campaign against him. At a press conference on January 30, 2009, Kodock said that 2008 had been a disappointing year for the economy, which he attributed to poor governance. He criticized the country's leaders for allegedly enriching themselves at the expense of the general population and failing to make productive use of money made available through debt cancellation. He also accused the government of assisting Hogbé Nlend's UPC faction as a means of weakening the party. However, he refrained from denouncing the composition of the newly appointed Elections Cameroon (ELECAM) electoral commission, unlike some opposition leaders, saying that ELECAM should be given a chance and judged on its performance.

On April 10, 2009, at a celebration marking the 61st anniversary of the UPC's founding, Kodock called for party unity; he described the UPC as "the immortal soul of the Cameroonian people" and warned that those dividing it were "cursed". On the same occasion, he stressed the need for political dialogue and said that patriots should mobilize and work for the improvement of living standards in Cameroon. He also said that "the only way of honoring the sacrifices of the founding fathers of the UPC is to make Cameroon a model in the Central African Sub-region".

Following the death of veteran UPC leader Ndeh Ntumazah in early 2010, Ntumazah's family refused to allow Kodock to speak at his funeral. Although Kodock and Ntumazah had once been rivals within the UPC, Kodock described Ntumazah as "a long-time friend" and "a comrade of the struggle", and he said that he was insulted by the family's decision to exclude him. Ntumazah's family, on the other hand, argued that the decision was appropriate because Kodock had ignored Ntumazah during the years of illness that preceded his death; they claimed that Kodock had never phoned to inquire about Ntumazah's health.

At Nyong-et-Kelle on 30 April 2011, amidst continued UPC factionalism, Kodock was designated as his faction's candidate for the October 2011 presidential election. A few months later, he was taken to South Africa to be treated for illness. Kodock was ultimately unable to stand as a presidential candidate because the authorities rejected his application.

Shortly after the rejection of his presidential candidacy, Kodock, who was still Secretary-General of the UPC, died on 24 October 2011 at the age of 78. He was buried at Mom village, his birthplace, on 17 December 2011.
