= Boumnyébel =

- Village
- Interactive map of Boumnyébel
- ,
- Coordinates: 3.883694°N 10.848956°E
- Country: Cameroon
- Region: Centre
- Department: Nyong-et-Kéllé

Boumnyébel is a community in Cameroon about 120 kilometres (75 mi) along the road from Yaoundé to Douala. The village is on the road from Edéa to Yaoundé, at the junction with the road from Bafia.

The Union of the Peoples of Cameroon (Union des Populations du Cameroun - UPC) leader Ruben Um Nyobé was born in the small village of Song Mpek to the south of Boumnyébel, then in the subdivision of Eséka in the Sanaga-Maritime department. After the UPC was made illegal on 13 July 1955 by the French government, Ruben Um Nyobé became a guerrilla in the forests near Boumnyébel. In 1956, Prime Minister André-Marie Mbida visited Boumnyébel, and delivered a famous ultimatum to the rebels. Ahmadou Ahidjo, then Minister of the Interior, made a secret visit for the same purpose in 1958. Um Nyobé was killed by the French army on 13 September 1958 and his body was displayed in front of the office of public works in Boumnyébel.

On 22 February 2011 a bus driver tried to pass a vehicle that was passing a transporter on a blind turn and collided head on with a logging truck travelling at high speed just outside Boumnyébel. First estimates were that twenty-seven people died. Victims were taken to the Ngog-Mapubi, Pouma and Eséka district hospitals and to the Centre Jamot Hospital and the Gynaecology, Obstetrics and Pediatrics Hospital in Yaoundé. In June 2011 a radar trap had been set up at Maholè, 100 metres (330 ft) from Boumnyébel, and was catching vehicles travelling at almost 130 kilometres per hour (81 mph) in a section with a speed limit of 70 kilometres per hour (43 mph).
