= Henri Hogbe Nlend =

Cameroonian mathematician, professor, government minister and presidential candidate

- Born: 23 December 1939 (age 86); French Cameroon
- Education: University of Bordeaux
- Scientific career
- Fields: Mathematics
- Workplaces: University of Yaoundé; University of Bordeaux
- Doctoral advisor: Jean Colmez; Laurent Schwartz

Henri Hogbe Nlend (born 23 December 1939) is a Cameroonian mathematician, university professor, former government minister and presidential candidate.

== Biography ==
Henri Hogbe Nlend was a professor at the University of Yaoundé, and at the University of Bordeaux.

In 1976, at a meeting of the International Mathematical Union it was decided to form an African Mathematical Union. Hogbe Nlend was elected as its first president, a post he held until 1986. The AMU was partially funded from another organization in Paris, which was also chaired by Hogbe Nlend. It is said that he was good at raising funds and that meetings were held twice a year.

Hogbe Nlend was a candidate in the presidential election held on 12 October 1997, which was boycotted by the major opposition parties, and placed second, although he received only 2.9% of the vote. The winning candidate, incumbent President Paul Biya, appointed Nlend as Minister of Scientific and Technical Research after the election.

His textbook on the theory of duality topology-bornology and its use in functional analysis has been described as a classic.

Henri Hogbe Nlend is a member of the Historical Cameroon Party, the Union of the Peoples of Cameroon (Union des Populations du Cameroun) and leader of one faction of this party. Hogbe Nlend fell out with Augustin Frederic Kodock, the Secretary-General of another UPC faction, in 2002. At the time of the July 2007 parliamentary election, Charly Gabriel Mbock, member of Hogbe Nlend UPC faction and outgoing UPC parliamentary deputy, resigned from the UPC and joined a new party, National Movement Party, vowing to carry on the struggle for which UPC has stood for, but this was disbanded when differences were resolved a year later, in a reconciliation meeting with the Hogbe Nlend UPC faction. (Kodock claimed in a press conference that Mbock had insufficient support to move this new party forward as he lacked the 500 signatures required by law).

Henri is a foundry fellow of the African Science Academy.

== Selected bibliography ==
1. Théorie des bornologies et applications, (in French) Lecture Notes in Mathematics, Vol. 213. Springer-Verlag, Berlin-New York, 1971. v+168 pp.
2. Bornologies and functional analysis, Translated from the French by V. B. Moscatelli. North-Holland Mathematics Studies, Vol. 26. Notas de Matemática, No. 62. [Notes on Mathematics, No. 62] North-Holland Publishing Co., Amsterdam-New York-Oxford, 1977. xii+144 pp. ISBN 0-7204-0712-5
3. editor Functional analysis and its applications. Papers from the International School held in Nice, August 25—September 20, 1986. . ICPAM Lecture Notes. World Scientific Publishing Co., Singapore, 1988. viii+380 pp. ISBN 978-9971-5-0545-5 (47-06)
