= March 1946 Cameroonian General Council election =

- 10 March 1946
- All 34 seats in the General Council

General Council elections were held in French Cameroons on 10 March 1946.

== Electoral system ==
At the time of the election, the General Council had 34 seats, of which six were elected by the first college (which had 2,500 registered voters), six were elected by the second college (which had 38,000 registered voters) and 22 were appointed.

== Campaign ==
A total of 35 candidates contested the 12 elected seats.
