= Osendé Afana =

Cameroonian Marxist economist and militant nationalist

Castor Osendé Afana
- Born: 1930; Ngoksa near Sa'a, Centre Region, Cameroon
- Died: 15 March 1966 (aged 35–36); Ndélélé, Cameroon
- Occupation: Economist

Castor Osendé Afana (1930 – 15 March 1966) was a Marxist economist and militant nationalist who died in 1966 while fighting as a guerrilla against the government of Cameroon.

== Early years ==
Castor Osendé Afana was born in 1930 in Ngoksa near Sa'a, in the Centre Region of Cameroon. In 1948 he was admitted to the seminary at Mvolyé, where he became a strong friend of Albert Ndongmo, the future Bishop of Nkongsamba. He left the seminary in 1950 and became a militant nationalist. At that time Eastern Cameroon was under French colonial rule, and would not gain independence until 1960. Afana joined the Union of the Peoples of Cameroon (UPC), a left-wing movement agitating for independence and led by Ruben Um Nyobé.

Osendé Afana went to Toulouse, France to study Economic Science, and by 1956 was a vice-president of the Black African Students Federation in France (Fédération des étudiants d'Afrique noire en France – FEANF), and was managing director of the FEANF organ L'Etudiant d'Afrique noire. As a UPC militant he ensured that the issues of Cameroon were well-covered. While he was managing director, the moderate viewpoint of the magazine shifted to a harder and more incisive tone. In 1958 Osendé Afana was General Treasurer of FEANF, as well as being responsible for the UPC in France.

In 1958, after Ruben Um Nyobé died, Osendé Afana decided to abandon his thesis and rejoin the leadership of the UPC, proposing himself as a candidate for the new Secretary General. Nyobé's successor, Félix-Roland Moumié, told him "There is no longer a Secretary General. There was one, he is dead, that is it." However, Osendé Afana was designated UPC representative at the Afro-Asian People's Solidarity Conference in Cairo in December 1957 – January 1958. The conference was dominated by supporters of the Chinese version of communism, and later Osendé's Maoism was to arouse suspicions with the UPC leadership in Accra. Osendé Afana completed his studies in Paris in September 1962 and travelled to Accra.

== UPC leadership in exile ==
In April and May 1955 the UPC held a series of angry meetings, circulated pamphlets and organised strikes. On 13 July 1955 the French government dissolved the UPC by decree. Most of the UPC leaders moved to Kumba in the British-administered Southern Cameroons to avoid being jailed by the colonial power. In July 1957, under pressure from the French, the British authorities in western Cameroon deported the leaders of the UPC to Khartoum, Sudan. They moved in turn to Cairo, Egypt, to Conakry, Guinea and finally to Accra, Ghana. After Cameroon gained independence in 1960, UPC rebels who had been fighting the French colonial government continued to fight the government of President Ahmadou Ahidjo, whom they considered to be a puppet of the French.

On 6 September 1962 the UPC leadership in exile met in Accra at Ndeh Ntumazah's house, and decided to exclude the "criminal clique of Woungly" from the administrative secretariat. At ten that evening, when the attendees were about to leave, a bomb exploded without causing any injury. The Ghana authorities were not amused and threw the entire UPC leadership in jail. In October they freed Massaga, Tchaptchet and Ntumazah, but kept Abel Kingué in prison. On 13 September 1962 the UPC organised its first Assemblée populaire sous maquis in Mungo, where the Revolutionary Committee was named. The committee was presided over by Ernest Ouandié. Other members were Abel Kingué, Michel Ndoh, Ndongo Diyé, Osendé Afana, Nicanor Njiawe and Woungly-Massaga. A two-headed leadership was theoretically in place, with Abel Kingué leading the exiles from Ghana and Ernest Ouandié in the maquis. The organisation functioned poorly due to communication problems and also to the Sino-Soviet split. The next year it split, with Abel Kingué and Osendé Afana allied with Ntumazah and opposed to the other leaders.

== Guerilla ==
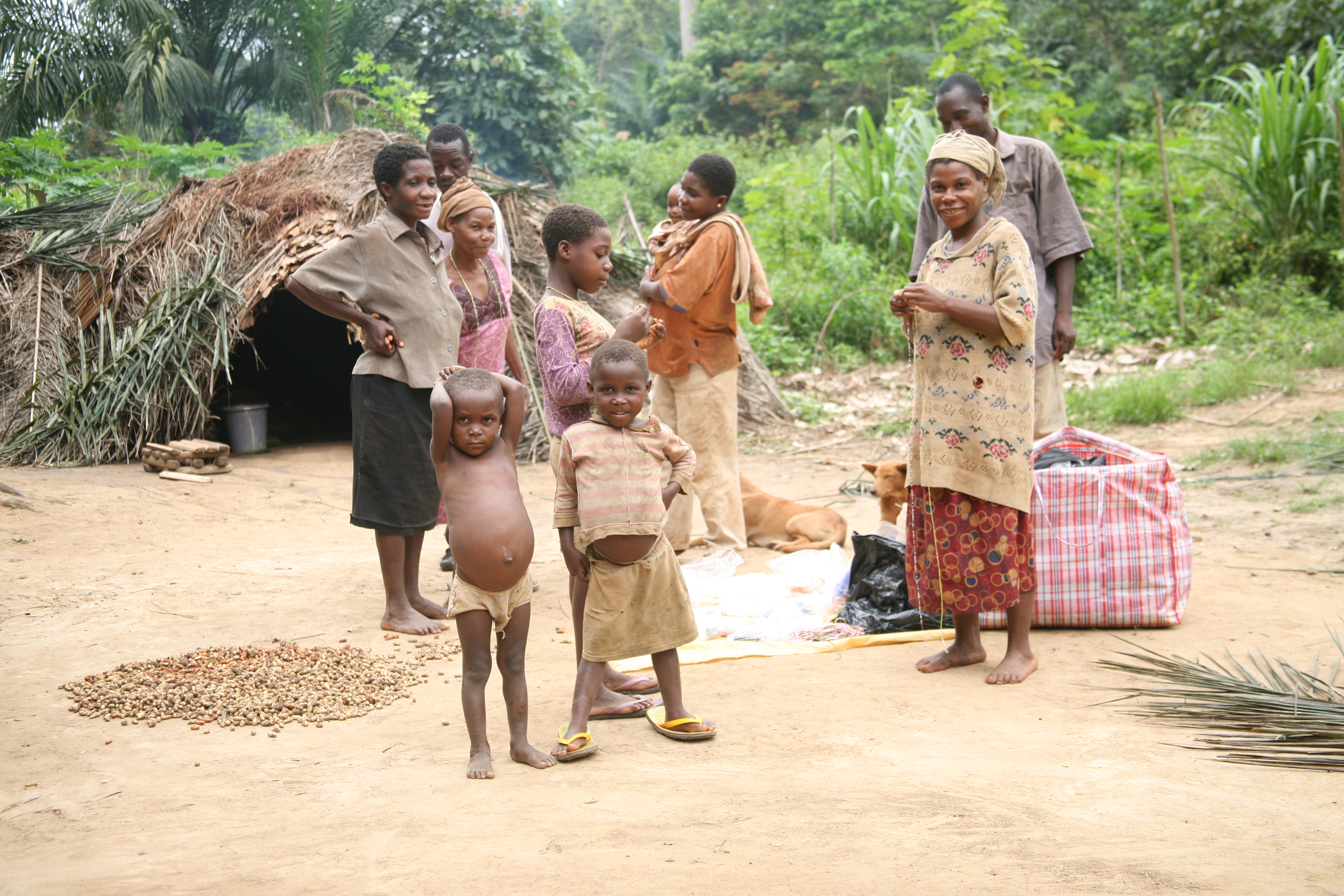
Baka people of Eastern Cameroon

In 1963 Osendé Afana left Cairo, Egypt, where he had taken refuge. He travelled to Conakry, Guinea, and then to Accra, Ghana, where he met the core of the leadership in exile. He spent the following months in Brazzaville before secretly entering Cameroon with the intent of establishing a new maquis, a second front in the Moloundou region, a corner of Cameroon that borders the Republic of the Congo. In August 1963 there had been a popular revolution in Congo Brazzaville in which the neo-colonial regime of Fulbert Youlou was replaced by a government led by Alphonse Massemba-Débat. This government was relatively friendly to the UPC rebels, opening the possibility of supply from the Congo.

Details of his activity in the period that followed are sketchy, but Osendé Afana seems to have made several visits to the extremely poor Moloundou region, where he made contact with the local people, mostly Bakas. On 1 September 1965 a small party led by Asana entered Moloundou, mainly aiming to educate the people rather than start an uprising, but was forced to leave quickly. He intended to establish a politico-administrative organisation on Maoist lines, but the population of this very backward part of Cameroon was not receptive to these ideas.

A few months later Osendé Afana's small group returned to Moloundou. By 5 March 1966 they had been detected and encircled by troops that were far more at home in the forest than they were. Osendé, a myopic intellectual, lost his spectacles and his sandals. On 15 March 1966 his party was ambushed by a Cameroon army unit. He did not take flight, as did most of his companions. Taken prisoner, he was killed and decapitated, and his head was flown by helicopter to Yaoundé so that President Ahmadou Ahidjo could look into the eyes of the dead man.

== Publications and views ==
Osendé Afana's article Justice pour le Cameroun (Justice for Cameroon) appeared in the first issue of L'Etudiant d'Afrique noire (The Black African Student) in 1956. It included a short but complete overview of the French and British colonial rule in Cameroon, including the annexation of various parts of the territory to Nigeria. In issue 8, January 1957, he published an important article Pour ou contre L'Etudian d'Afrique Noire? In February 1957 Afana gave his study Le Kamerun en lutte to the fourth United Nations commission, and in July 1957 published L'Etat sous tutelle de Cameroun (The Trust State of Cameroon). Osendé Afana was the author of a thesis on economics that was published in the year of his death.

In the 1950s and 1960s there was rivalry between the Chinese and Soviet communist parties. Osendé Afana aligned himself with the Chinese, who seemed more revolutionary in their views than the Soviets. He theorised on the existence of a "primitive communism" in the pre-colonial era, but noted the existence of contradictions in the social and inter-tribal structures, and the relations between the sexes and the generations. In a brochure published after his death, Osendé Afana gave the standard Marxist viewpoint: "The proletariat is the most revolutionary class... Some say that in Africa it is the peasantry that is the most exploited... but anyway, it is the proletariat that is most conscious of their exploitation."
