= Ernestine Ouandié =

Cameroonian journalist (1961–2009)

- Born: 11 May 1961; Yaba, Lagos, Nigeria
- Disappeared: 27 October 2009 (ages 48); Near Foumbot, Cameroon
- Body discovered: 31 October 2009
- Occupation: Journalist
- Parent: Ernest Ouandié

Ernestine Ouandié (11 May 1961 – 27 October 2009) was a Cameroonian journalist. The daughter of political exile Ernest Ouandié who she never met, Ouandié had a difficult childhood in Ghana, and later in life (after becoming a journalist) moved to Cameroon to learn more about her father.

She was featured in a documentary directed by Jean-Marie Teno, titled Une feuille dans le vent (Leaf in the Wind), about her life and her feelings about her father's 1971 execution. The documentary footage was filmed in 2004; the film was released in 2013 after she committed suicide.

== Early life and education ==
Ernestine Ouandié was born in Yaba, Lagos, Nigeria, on 11 May 1961. She was the daughter of Ernest Ouandié, vice-president of the Union of the Peoples of Cameroon, who was in exile in Nigeria, and a Ghanaian mother. Ouandié had a difficult childhood, initially being raised by her maternal aunt in Ghana who physically and mentally abused her. She returned to her mother who abandoned her; after ending up homeless, she found refuge in Lomé where she was able to seek an education.

Ouandié never met her father; he was executed on 15 January 1971 in Bafoussam for his fight against colonialism and neocolonialism. In 1986, Ouandié earned her degree in journalism and moved to Cameroon so that she could learn more about her father.

== Personal life and career ==
In her forties, Ouandié worked as head of the news bureau for the Ministry of Communication in Bafoussam. She was the wife of Dr. Jacques Djoko Tamnou, a biologist pharmacist, and they lived in the commune of Foumbot with their three children. She was a member of Cameroon's Commission Nationale des Droits de l'Homme et des Libertés (National Commission on Human Rights and Freedoms).

== Death ==
Ouandié disappeared on 27 October 2009. On 31 October, she was found dead near the Noun River between Bafoussam and Foumbot. She is thought to have committed suicide.

She is the subject of a 55-minute 2013 documentary directed by Jean-Marie Teno, Une feuille dans le vent (Leaf in the Wind). In interviews with Teno she talks about the injustice and suspicious circumstances of her father's death; she describes herself as feeling like a leaf on a branch cut from the tree due to her separation from him. She asks Teno, "How do you expect a leaf taken from a tree to survive?" The interview footage was filmed in 2004 and Teno decided to make the film after learning of her death. The African Studies Review describes it as providing "an informative and compelling snapshot of how decolonization was derailed in Cameroon".
