= Ernest Ouandié =

Cameroonian activist (1924–1971)

- Ernest Ouandié on 15 January 1971, before being executed
- Born: Ernest Nicolas Ouandié; 1924; Badoumla, Bana, West Cameroon
- Died: 15 January 1971 (aged 46–47); Bafoussam, Cameroon
- Occupation: Teacher
- Known for: Executed for treason
- Children: Ernestine Ouandié

Ernest Nicolas Ouandié (1924 – 15 January 1971) was a leader of the struggle for independence of Cameroon in the 1950s who continued to resist the government of President Ahmadou Ahidjo after Cameroon was granted a nominal independence by French president Charles de Gaulle and the French parliament on 1 January 1960.

In August 1970, after a decade in an armed resistance dubbed "maquis," he surrendered at the gendarmerie station at Mbanga. He was tried on charges of "rebellion" and "seeking to overthrow a legal government using violence" and miscellaneous other charges, without counsel. (His French counsels, among them the future French president François Mitterrand, had been denied entry into Cameroon by the government of Ahmadou Babatoura Ahidjo.) He was sentenced to death by the martial court tasked with the trial.

On 15 January 1971, before the appeal process had been exhausted, he was executed in Bafoussam on the main public square in front of about 40,000 local Cameroonian citizens. They had been summoned to attend the event, which the government had set as an exemplary punishment to instill state terror in the population that had fought French rule. The firing squad of Cameroonian soldiers was commanded by a French army officer who, after the legendary freedom fighter had already fallen, personally added the "coup de grace" gunshot to his head with a pistol. Wounded by several bullets but still conscious, Ouandié's last call to his people to continue his fight was: "History will tell; Let the fight be continued by others. Long live (God bless) Cameroon." As the Frenchman's bullet entered his head, he took his last breath.

== Early years ==
Ernest Ouandié was born in 1924 in Badoumla, Bana district in Haut-Nkam in a Bamiléké family. He attended public school in Bafoussam, and then l'Ecole Primaire Supérieure de Yaoundé where he obtained a Diplôme des Moniteurs Indigènes (DMI) in November 1943. He began work as a teacher. In 1944 he joined the Union of Confederate Trade-Unions of Cameroon, affiliated with the French General Confederation of Labour (CGT). From 1944 to 1948 he taught at Edéa. On 7 October 1948, he was posted to Dschang. A month later he was posted to Douala as director of the New-Bell Bamiléké public school.

In 1948 Ouandié became a member of the Union of the Peoples of Cameroon (Union des Populations du Cameroun – UPC), a left-wing pro-independence political party. Four years later he was elected vice-president of the UPC. In September 1953 he was assigned to Doumé and Yoko in Mbam-et-Kim. In December 1954 he was posted to Batouri, then to Bertoua. Finally, in January 1955, he was assigned to Douala again. Also in December 1954 he attended the World Congress of Democratic Youth in China and traveled to Paris and Moscow.

== Guerrilla fighter ==
In April and May 1955 the UPC held a series of militant meetings, circulated pamphlets, and organized strikes. On 20 June 1955, the UPC leader Ruben Um Nyobé was sentenced in absentia to six months in prison and a large fine. On 13 July 1955, the French government of Edgar Faure dissolved the UPC by decree. Most of the UPC leaders moved to Kumba in British-administered Southern Cameroons to avoid being jailed by the colonial power. Armed revolution broke out in Cameroon. Ruben Um Nyobé remained in the French zone in the forest near his home village of Boumnyébel, where he had taken refuge in April 1955. This village lies just east of the Sanaga-Maritime area of the Littoral province on the road connecting Edéa to Yaoundé, the capital. The UPC nationalist rebels conducted a fierce struggle against the French, who fought back equally ruthlessly. The insurgents were forced to take refuge in the swamps and forests. Ruben Um Nyobé was cornered in the Sanaga-Maritime area and killed on 13 September 1958.

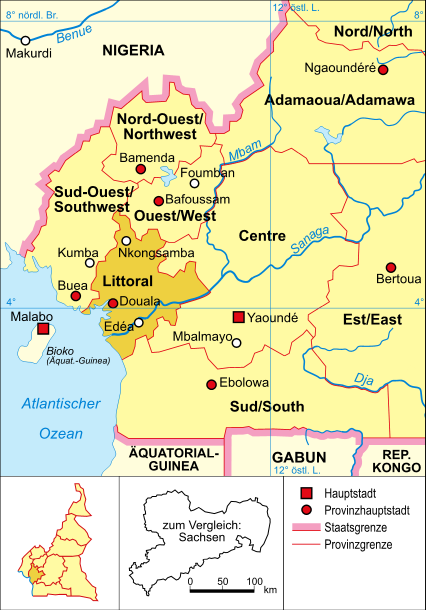
The western part of Cameroon. Much of the guerilla activity took part in the Ouest/West and Littoral provinces.

Ouandié had taken refuge in Kumba in 1956. In July 1957, under pressure from the French, the British authorities in western Cameroon deported Ernest Ouandié and other leaders of the UPC to Khartoum, Sudan. He then moved to Cairo, Egypt; to Conakry, Guinea; and finally to Accra, Ghana. After Cameroon gained independence in 1960, UPC rebels who had been fighting the French colonial government continued to fight the government of President Ahmadou Ahidjo, whom they considered to be a puppet of the French. During and after the transition to democracy, Ahidjo had asked the French to lend troops to keep the peace. Led by General Max Briand, who had served previously in Algeria and Indochina, these troops conducted a pacification campaign in the Bamiléké territory of the West, Centre and Littoral provinces. The campaign featured human rights abuses from all sides. During the UPC insurrection against both the French and Cameroonians, most sources place the death toll in the tens of thousands. Some sources go higher and place the death toll in the hundreds of thousands.

In 1960 Ouandié, Félix-Roland Moumié, Abel Kingué, and other UPC leaders were exiled, isolated, and desperate. The UPC leadership was increasingly involved in factional squabbles, out of touch with what was happening in Cameroon. Moumié was poisoned by French agents using thallium on 13 October 1960, and died on 4 November 1960, leaving Ouandié as head of the UPC. On 1 May 1961, the military tribunal in Yaoundé condemned Oaundié and Abel Kingué (in absentia) to deportation. That year Ouandié returned secretly from Accra to Cameroon to work toward the overthrow of the Ahidjo regime. The Southern Cameroons (now the Southwest and Northwest regions) gained independence from the British and joined a loose federation with East Cameroon on 1 October 1961. Abel Kingué died in Cairo on 10 June 1964, leaving Ouandié the last member of the original leadership. President Ahidjo declared that Ouandié was public enemy number one.

Led by Ouandié, guerrilla warfare against the Ahidjo regime by the Armée de libération nationale Kamerounaise (ANLK) continued throughout the 1960s, with the zones of activity gradually becoming depopulated and the guerrilla numbers slowly dwindling. The rebel leader Tankeu Noé was captured and executed. In January 1964 public executions of fifteen captured rebels were staged in Douala, Bafoussam and Edéa as part of the celebrations of the fourth anniversary of independence. Meanwhile the UPC members in exile were locked in a power struggle that caused Ouandié and his maquis to increasingly fear betrayal, while the government used fear of the rebel forces to justify increasing the security forces occupying the Bamiléké towns and villages. The guerrillas lived a hunted life and were often short of food. A surviving member of the rebel force said that they did not do much fighting except in the kitchen.

== Capture and execution ==
Albert Ndongmo, also a Bamiléké, was made Bishop of Nkongsamba in 1964 in a diocese contained within the zone of guerrilla operations. By Ndongmo's account, in 1965 President Ahmadou Ahidjo asked him to try to mediate with Ouandié to try to end the fighting. In the following years Ndongmo had a series of meetings with the rebels. In 1970 Ouandié called for help, and Ndongmo picked him up in his car and took him to his own house, where he let him stay for several nights. Ndongmo claimed that his actions were consistent with President Ahidjo's instructions, but it seems clear that he sympathized strongly with the rebels although he did not approve of their methods. Ndongmo was called to go to Rome to answer some questions about business dealings, but before leaving, he sent Ouandié and his secretary to take refuge with his catechist on the outskirts of Mbanga. The catechist refused to accept Oaundié and alerted the police.

Ouandié and the secretary went on the run but were in unfamiliar territory. They were hunted by the local people as well as the police. Disagreeing over directions, they parted company. Ouandié tried to hide in the banana plantations, even under bridges, but became hopelessly lost. On 19 August 1970, Ouandié surrendered to the authorities near the town of Loum. Exhausted, thirsty, hungry, and disoriented, he had asked a passerby for help. The man recognised him and led him toward a nearby gendarmerie. When they neared the building and Ouandié recognised his situation, he abandoned his guide and simply walked into the post and told them who he was. At first the officers panicked and fled, but then returned and called for help. Ouandié was taken by helicopter to Yaoundé and imprisoned.

Ndongmo was arrested when he returned from Rome. On 29 August the Cameroon Times ran a lead story titled "Bishop Ndongmo arrested for alleged subversion." The paper also reported that Ouandié had given in to government forces. The reporter, editor, and publisher of the paper were arrested, tried and convicted by a military tribunal on charges of publishing false information. The court said that the term "give in" could be taken to mean that the government was unable to catch Ouandié, which would tend to undermine and ridicule the government. The court said that he had been captured. Ouandié was tried in December 1970 and condemned to death. He was executed by firing squad on 15 January 1971, at Bafoussam.

In France, most of the major media (AFP, Le Monde...) reproduced without hindsight the version presented by Ahmadou Ahidjo's government. On the other hand, Henri Curiel's Solidarity network was very active, mobilizing lawyers and intellectuals to try to organise the legal and media defense of the accused, and approaching French diplomats to convince them to intervene. An International Committee for the Defense of Ernest Ouandié was formed, chaired by the naturalist Theodore Monod. Despite the lack of interest from the media, several personalities joined the committee: former minister Pierre Cot, writer Michel Leiris, philosopher Paul Ricœur and linguist Noam Chomsky. In the Thomson-CSF plant in Villacoublay, dozens of workers signed a petition of support.

== Legacy ==
In January 1971 Bishop Ndongmo was also tried for treason by a military tribunal, found guilty, and sentenced to death by firing squad. The sentence was commuted to life imprisonment, and he was sent to a prison camp in Tcholliré. Ndongmo was pardoned in 1976 on condition that he leave the country.

In January 1991, on the weekend following the twentieth anniversary of Ouandié's death, opposition groups moved to lay flowers on the place where he had died. The governor of Western Province told the population to remain at home, troops were placed on alert, and security was stepped up throughout Bafoussam, particularly around the place where Ouandié had been executed. According to one account, "The forces of law and order, alerted by the gathering crowds, descended on the site, dispersing the crowd and seizing the bouquets of flowers. [Some people] were arrested by soldiers and taken to the office of the provincial Governor; there they were interrogated." After a change of policy, on 16 December 1991, the parliament of Cameroon declared Ouandié a national hero.

In January 2012 the reconstituted Union des Populations du Cameroun (UPC) protested that Ouandié's grave had been desecrated. The UPC recalled that he had been designated a national hero by the act of 1991 and said some minimum level of security should have been provided for his grave. The grave was untended, and the right side of the tomb was broken. However, it is possible that the tomb had been damaged by Ouandié's family, in a ritual common to that part of the country.
