= Jean-Marie Teno =

Cameroonian film director and film editor

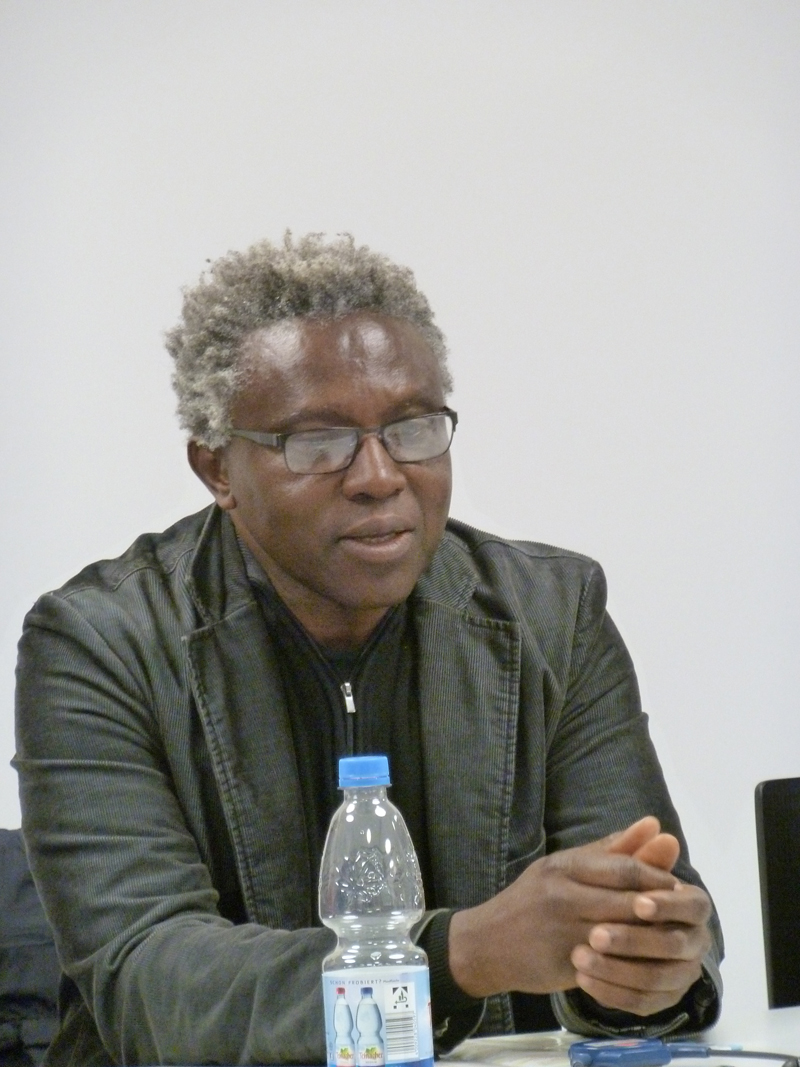
- Born: 14 May 1954 (age 72); Famleng, Bandjoun.
- Citizenship: Cameroonian
- Education: University of Valenciennes
- Occupations: Film director and filmmaker.
- Notable work: Yellow Fever taximan (short film)

Jean-Marie Teno (born 14 May 1954) is a Cameroonian film director and filmmaker, "one of Africa's most prolific filmmakers". His films address censorship, human rights violations, globalization, and the effects of colonialism. Teno has made films in many different forms but favors making documentaries. In an interview when asked about his favor style of film to make he responded, "documentary because when you do fiction, people think it's not true. When it's the documentary, they are embarrassed, embarrassed".

== Life ==
Teno was born in 1954 in Famleng in Bandjoun. He studied audiovisual communication at the University of Valenciennes and worked as a film critic for Bwana Magazine and as editor-in-chief at France 3. In 1983, he directed his first short documentary Schubbah after receiving encouragement from Souleymane Cissé, a famous African director. In 1992 he made his documentary Africa, I will pluck you on the effects of colonialism and neocolonialism in Cameroon. In 1996, he made Clando, which won the Audience Award at the 6th African Film Festival in Milan, Italy.

Jean-Marie Teno is also a producer of his own films with Les Films du Raphia. In 2007-2008, he was a Visiting Artist at Copeland Fellow at Amherst College, and in 2009-2010 he was Visiting Professor at Hampshire College, Massachusetts.

He lives between France, Cameroon and the United States.

== Film reception ==
Despite receiving high praise from the internationally community, Teno's films were banned from being aired in Cameroon. Teno was reportedly told in a meeting with the Director of Television of Cameroon that his films would never be broadcast. Teno received much appreciation throughout his career for telling African history from an African perspective. In part due the success of directors like Teno, more universities began offering African film studies classes and looking at alternative perspectives of history.

== Filmography ==
- 1983 : Schubbah (short film)
- 1985 : Tribute (short film)
- 1985 : Yellow Fever taximan (short film)
- 1987 : The Slap and the Caress (short film)
- 1988 : The Misery Water (documentary)
- 1990 : The Last Voyage (short film)
- 1991 : Mister Foot (documentary)
- 1992 : Africa, I'll pluck you... (documentary)
- 1996 : The Head in the Clouds (short film)
- 1996 : Clando (feature film)
- 1999 : Chef! (documentary)
- 2000 : Holidays at home (documentary)
- 2002 : The Marriage of Alex (documentary)
- 2004 : The colonial misunderstanding (documentary)
- 2009 : Holy Places (documentary)
- 2013 : A Leaf in the Wind (documentary), about the life of Ernestine Ouandié

== Awards ==
Clando

- 1996: Prize of the International Federation of Film Crews at the Friborg International Film Festival (Switzerland); Audience Award at the Milan African Film Festival (Italy); Grand Prize at the Vues d'Afrique Festival of Montreal; Human Rights Award at Montreal's Vues d'Afrique Festival

Head in the clouds

- 1994: OAU Jury Prize at the Carthage Film Days
- 1995: IUCN Prize and African Insurers Award at FESPACO; Documentary Award at the Festival Vues d'Afrique de Montréal

Africa, I'll pluck you ...

- 1992: Documentary Award at the Troia Festival; OCIC Jury Prize at the Carthage Film Days; Prize for Solidarity in the world at Carthage Film Days.

Water of misery

- 1989: TV5-Europe Prize at Écovision in Lille; Honorable Mention at the Troia Festival (Portugal)

Yellow fever taximan

- 1986: Special mention at the Clermont-Ferrand Festival
