= Fokoué =

Coordinates: 5°21′N 10°07′E

- Commune and town
- Interactive map of Fokoué
- Country: Cameroon
- Time zone: UTC+1 (WAT)

Fokoué is a town and commune in Cameroon.

Fokoue, also known as foo kweh, meaning the "king of strength" in yehba, comprises a commune made up of five villages: Bamehou, Fomopea, Fontsa Toula, Fotomena, and Fokoue. The village Fokoue is under the reign of chief Henri Tchomba Tessa.

== See also ==
- Communes of Cameroon
