= Tankeu Noé =

Camerounian guerrilla leader

- Died: 3 January 1964
- Known for: Guerrilla

Tankeu Noé (died 3 January 1964) was a member of the Union of the Peoples of Cameroon (UPC) guerrilla forces in Cameroon fighting first against French colonial government and then against the government of Ahmadou Ahidjo in the Douala region.

Tankeu Noé was from the Bamileke community. He became a commander of the UPC's Armée de libération nationale Kamerounaise (ALNK) in the Littoral Province. The ALNK in Cameroon was poorly organized and very weakly armed, but was pragmatic, knew the country well and was very mobile, using guerrilla tactics. At first, the UPC rebels were fighting against the French colonial forces. After Cameroon gained independence in 1960, they continued to fight the government of President Ahmadou Ahidjo, whom they considered to be a puppet of the French.

On the 27 and 28 of June 1959 forty of Tankeu Noé's fighters attacked the military camp of Mboppi in Douala and took 19 guns. In the counter-attack, UPC documents were taken that let the French arrest about 100 suspects. As a result of this action, the French high command of Cameroon decided to call for five companies of troops and five squads of gendarmes as reinforcements. Starting in 1960, troops from the newly formed Cameroonian army worked closely with French colonial forces under general Max Briand in suppressing the rebellion. On 24 April 1960 the Congo quarter of Douala, Tankeu's fief, was burnt by security forces, Officially there were 19 deaths and 5,000 made homeless.

Tankeu Noé was captured and found guilty on 9 September 1963. The law of 30 October 1963 gave the government increased powers to deal with opponents. Tankeu Noé and Makanda Pouth, accused of terrorism but not of any other crime, had been sentenced to hard labor. Using the powers of the new law, the government brought them before a military tribunal that condemned them to death. Tankeu Noé was executed on 3 January 1964 in Douala. He was shot in public, tied to a power pole in the Congo quarter of the city.
