= French Cameroon =

1916–1960 French mandate in Central Africa

Territory of Cameroun Territoire du Cameroun
- 1916–1960
- Flag Coat of arms

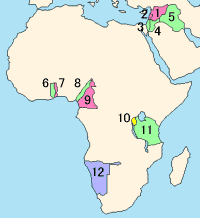
- League of Nations mandates in the Middle East and Africa; French Cameroon is number 9.
- Status: Occupied territory of France (1916–1922); Class B League of Nations mandate of France (1922–1946); United Nations trust territory under French administration (1946–1960)
- Capital: Yaoundé; 3°51′59″N 11°31′14″E
- Official languages: French
- Common languages: Ewondo; Fula; Basaa; Bulu; Bamum
- Religion: Christianity, Bwiti, Islam
- President
  - 1916–1920: Raymond Poincaré
  - 1959–1960: Charles de Gaulle
- History
  - German Cameroon partitioned: 20 July 1916
  - independence as Cameroon: 1 January 1960
- Currency: French franc (1916–1945); CFA franc (1945–1961)
Preceded by	Succeeded by
Kamerun	Republic of Cameroon

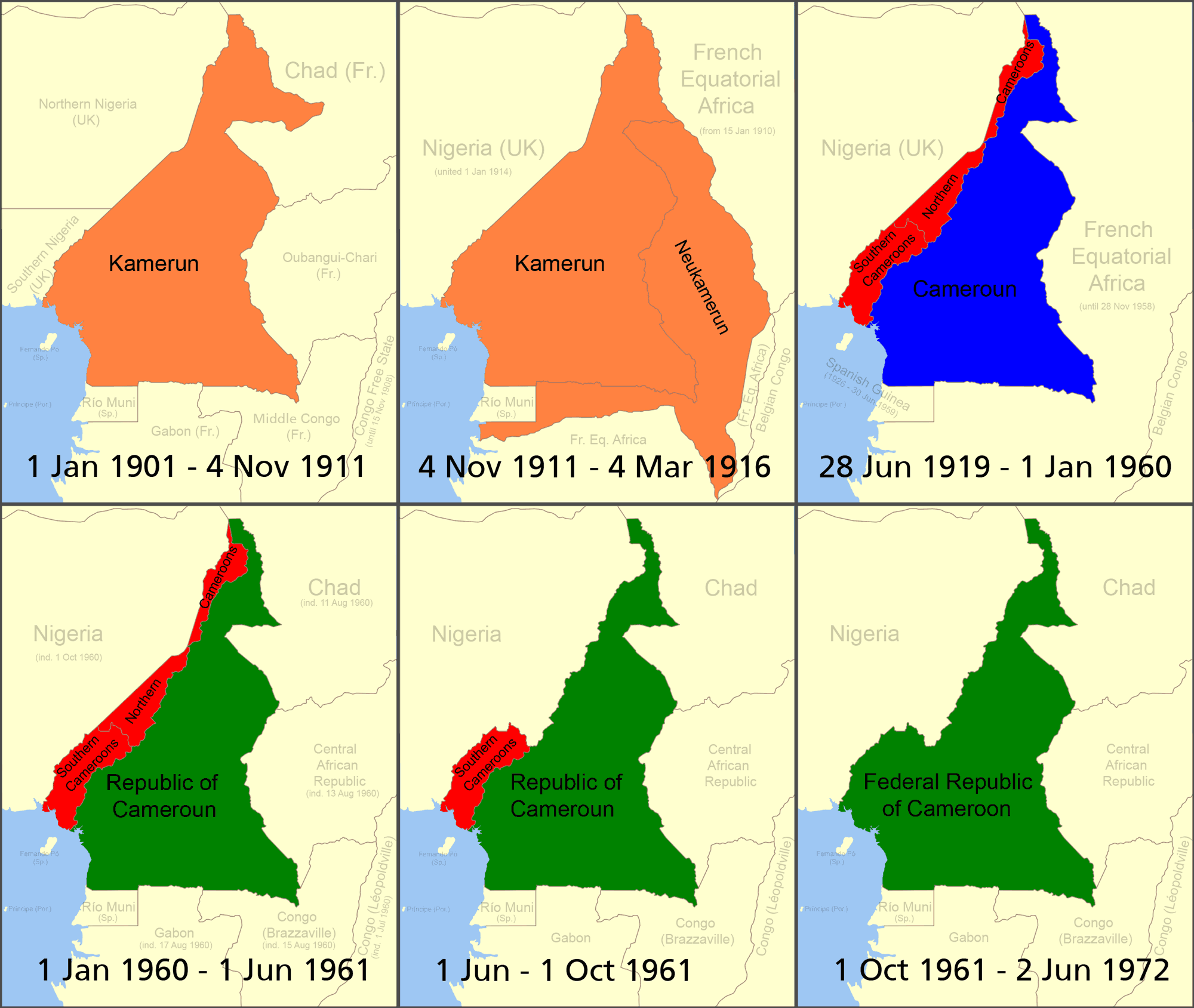
Map of the history of Cameroon; French Cameroon is the blue area.

French Cameroon, also known as the French Cameroons (French: Cameroun), was a French mandate territory in Central Africa. It now forms part of the independent country of Cameroon.

French Cameroon was created from the eastern part of the former German colony of Cameroon (German: Deutsche Kolonie Kamerun). Its status, from 1919, was that of a ‘mandated territory’ of the League of Nations (LON), later becoming a ‘trust territory’ under the United Nations (UN). It was also a member of the French Union as an associated territory, then a trust state of Cameroon, and finally a member state of the French Community.

== History ==
=== Beginnings ===
The area of present-day Cameroon came under German sovereignty during the "Scramble for Africa" at the end of the 19th century. The German protectorate commenced in 1884 with a treaty with local chiefs in the Douala area, in particular Ndumbe Lobe Bell, then gradually it was extended to the interior. In 1911, France ceded parts of its territory to German Cameroon, as a result of the Agadir Crisis, the new territory being henceforth known as Neukamerun ("New Cameroon"). During World War I, the German protectorate was occupied by British and French troops, and later mandated to each country by the League of Nations in 1922. The British mandate was known as British Cameroons and the French mandate as French Cameroon (French: Cameroun). Following World War II each of the mandate territories was made a United Nations Trust Territory. An insurrection headed by Ruben Um Nyobé and the Union of the Peoples of Cameroon (UPC) erupted in 1955, strongly repressed by the French Fourth Republic. French Cameroon became independent as the Republic of Cameroon in January 1960 and in October 1961 the southern part of British Cameroons joined it to form the Federal Republic of Cameroon. The Muslim northern part of British Cameroons had opted for union with Nigeria in May the same year. The conflict with the UPC lasted until the 1970s.

=== Interwar period ===
After World War I, French Cameroon was not integrated to French Equatorial Africa (AEF) but made into a "Commissariat de la République autonome" under French mandate. France enacted an assimilationist policy with the aim of having German presence forgotten, by teaching French on all of the territory and imposing French law, while pursuing the "indigenous politics", which consisted of keeping control of the judiciary system and of the police, while tolerating traditional law issues. The colonial administration also followed public health policies (Eugène Jamot did some research on sleeping sickness) as well as encouraging Francophony. Charles Atangana, designated paramount chief by the Germans, and others local chiefs were invited to France, and Paul Soppo Priso named president of the JEUCAFRA (Cameroon French Youth). Charles Atangana would visit the 1931 Paris Colonial Exhibition and attend the 1935 French Colonial Conference. France took care to make disappear all remains of German presence and aimed at eradicating any trace of Germanophilia. French racism became prevalent throughout the colony rather quickly, and anti-French sentiment followed and would be strengthened in the late 1940s.

=== World War II ===
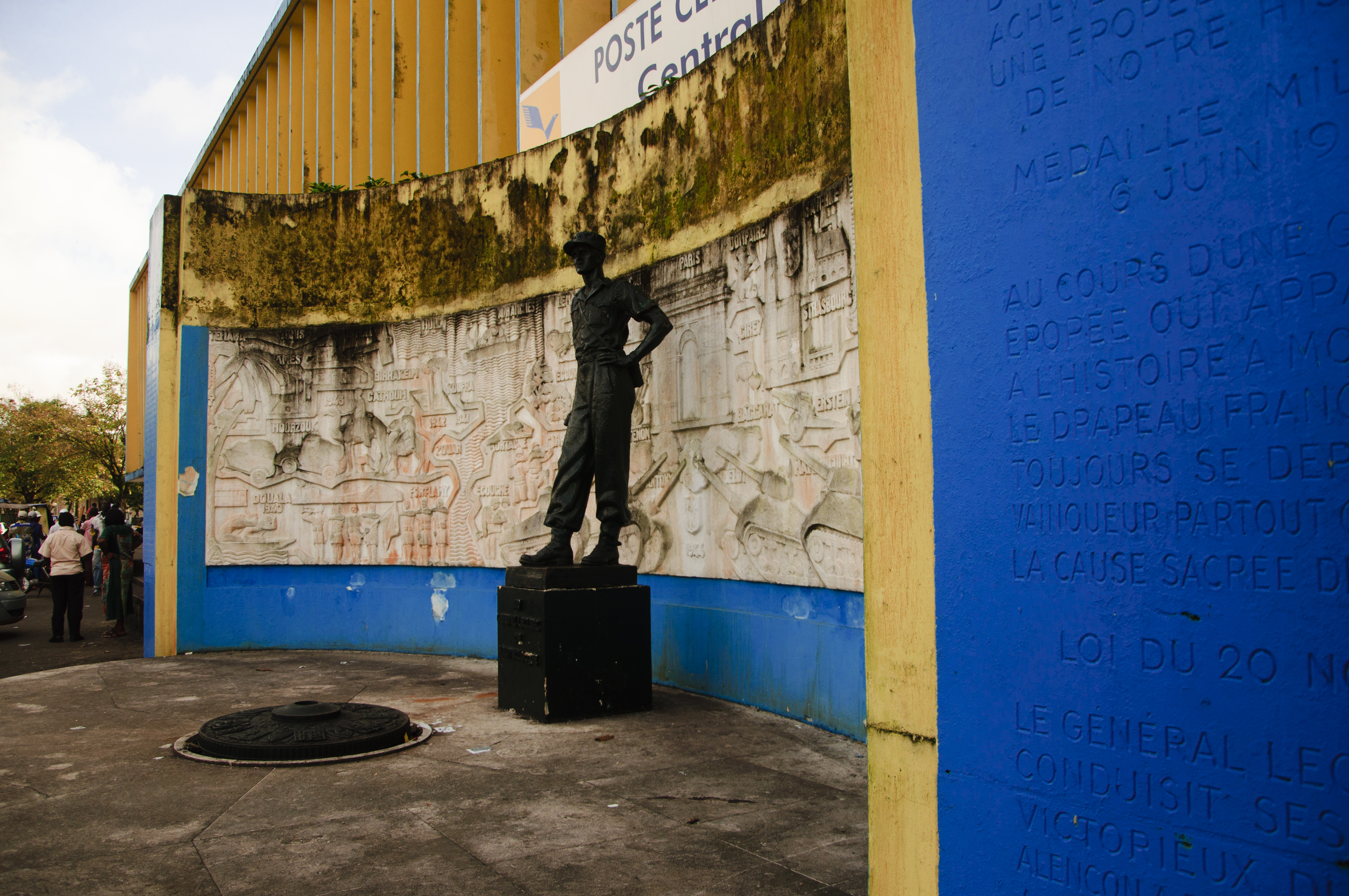
Monument of General Leclerc in Douala

In 1940, French Cameroon rallied to Free France. Troops under General Philippe Leclerc landed at Douala, capturing it on 27 August, and then moved to Yaounde, where pro-Vichy France governor Richard Brunot surrendered the civil administration.

=== Post-war ===
After World War II, French Cameroon was made a United Nations Trust Territory and unified into the French Union. From the beginning of the 1940s, colonial authorities encouraged a policy of agricultural diversification into monocultural crops: coffee in the west, cotton in the North and cocoa in the south. Construction of roads allowed for greater exploitation of wood. Of a total of three million inhabitants, the French Cameroon territory counted 10% settlers, many who had been resident for decades, and approximatively 15,000 people linked to the colonial administration (civil servants, private agents, missionaries etc.)

In 1946, a Representative Assembly of French Cameroon (ARCAM) was constituted. Paul Ajoulat and Alexandre Douala Manga Bell were elected deputies of the French National Assembly. Some private and public schools were opened, while the best students were sent to Dakar (Senegal) or France to study in college. The colonial administration also built electricity and water infrastructures in large cities. In 1952, the Representative Assembly became the Territorial Assembly of Cameroon (ATCAM).

The Union of the Peoples of Cameroon (UPC), an anti-colonialist party created in 1948 and which struggled for unification of both Cameroons and for independence was outlawed in 1955. The Cameroon War then escalated and lasted for at least seven years, with the French Fourth Republic leading a harsh repression of the anti-colonialist movement. The conflict found its roots in the opposition between the settlers and the Cameroonese trade-unionists in the cities. After the Brazzaville Conference of January 1944, during which the Provisional Government of the French Republic (GPRF) issued several promises concerning progressive self-rule, the settlers organized themselves in 1945 in "General estates of colonisation" (Etats généraux de la colonisation").

A Cercle d'études marxistes (Marxist Study Circle) was created by Cameroonians in 1945, soon followed by the creation of the Union of Confederate Trade Unions of Cameroon (Union des syndicats confédérés du Cameroun, USCC) at the initiative of the CGT trade-union. Conflicts erupted in September 1945, with the settlers violently debating with the French governor. Members of the USCC were arrested. In 1948, Ruben Um Nyobé became the head of the resistance movement, with a nationalist and revolutionary program. Nyobé's UPC was at first only the local section of the African Democratic Rally created in 1946. However, it refused to split, as did the African Democratic Rally, with the French Communist Party (PCF) in 1950. After some revolts and increasing tensions with the colonial administration, the UPC was outlawed on 13 July 1955 by the governor Roland Pré, forcing Nyobé into hiding, from where he led a guerrilla war against the French administration.

=== Self rule in 1956 and continuation of the war ===
In 1957–58, Pierre Messmer, a Gaullist and head of the haut-commissaire of Cameroon (executive branch of the French government) started a decolonisation process which went further than the 1956 loi-Defferre (Defferre Act). At the same time, the Fourth Republic was stranded in the Algerian War (1954–62). It managed to obtain support of Britain in Cameroon.

France granted internal autonomy in 1956, and the ATCAM became the Legislative Assembly of Cameroon (ALCM). André Marie Bbida became prime minister in 1957, and Ahmadou Ahidjo vice-premier. Despite the requests by Rubem Um Nyobe, head of the UPC, the new government refused to legalize the UPC. André Bdida renounced in 1958, replaced by Ahidjo, while Um Nyobé was killed by a French commando in the "maquis" on 13 September 1958. Following his death, the UPC divided itself, while competing leaders, verbally in favor of Marxism revolution, radicalized the movement. Starting in 1959, the colonial war juxtaposed itself with a civil war, Ahmadou Ahidjo taking the place of France in fighting the UPC. The successor of Nyobé, Félix-Roland Moumié, was assassinated in 1960 in Geneva by the SDECE, French secret services.

The insurrection continued after independence was granted, even though the UPC had been officially dismantled. The rebellion was really crushed only in the 1970s, after the death in the "maquis" of Ossendé Afana in March 1966 and the public execution of Ernest Ouandié, a historic leader of the UPC, in January 1971.

Estimates about the number of victims of the war ranged around several tens of thousands of deaths, mainly after independence. The war featured human rights abuses by UPC militants and the troops of Cameroon and France. Despite the efforts of writer Mongo Beti, the war and the brutal methods employed by the French government has been overshadowed in France by the Algerian War. The lack interest has been attributed to the use of professional soldiers in the conflict, the low number of Cameroonian immigrants in France requesting recognition of the crimes committed during the war, and, more recently, the fall of Communism.

French Cameroon became independent on 1 January 1960, becoming the Republic of Cameroon. The civil war with the UPC lasted for years afterward.

=== Colony and mandate ===
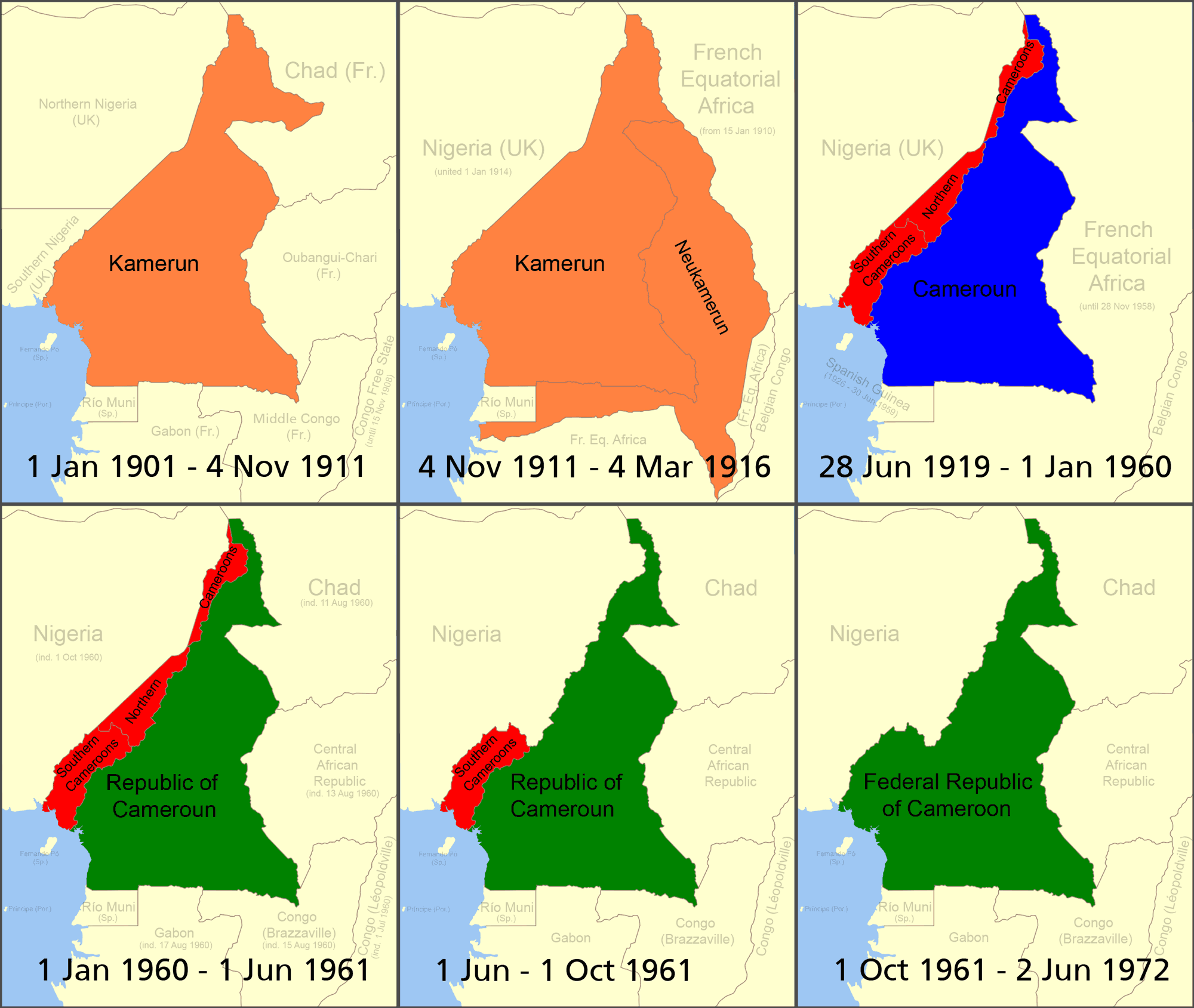
Cameroon from 1901 to 1972 German Cameroon (Kamerun) British Cameroon French Cameroon (Cameroun) independent Cameroon (Cameroun)

The area of present-day Cameroon was claimed by Germany as a protectorate during the "Scramble for Africa" at the end of the 19th century. During World War I, it was occupied by French and Belgian troops.

In 1922 it was mandated to Great Britain and France by the League of Nations. The French mandate was known as Cameroun, in French West Africa. The British mandate was administered as two territories, Northern Cameroons and Southern Cameroons in British West Africa. British Northern Cameroons consisted of two non-contiguous sections, divided by where the Nigerian and Cameroon borders met.

=== Independence ===
French Cameroon became independent as the Republic of Cameroon on 1 January 1960, and Nigeria was scheduled for independence later that same year, which raised question of what to do with the British territory. After some discussion (which had been going on since 1959), a plebiscite (British Cameroons referendum) was agreed to and held on 11 February 1961. The Muslim-majority Northern Cameroons area opted for union with Nigeria, and the Southern Cameroons area voted to join Cameroon.

Northern Cameroons became a region of Nigeria on 31 May 1961, while Southern Cameroons became part of the Federal Republic of Cameroon on 1 October.

== See also ==
- Cameroon
- East Cameroon
- German Cameroon
- British Cameroons
- French colonial empire
- History of colonialism
- Algerian War
- List of French possessions and colonies
- French Equatorial Africa
- League of Nations Mandate
- French colonial flags
- French West Africa
- Cameroonian French
