= Eséka =

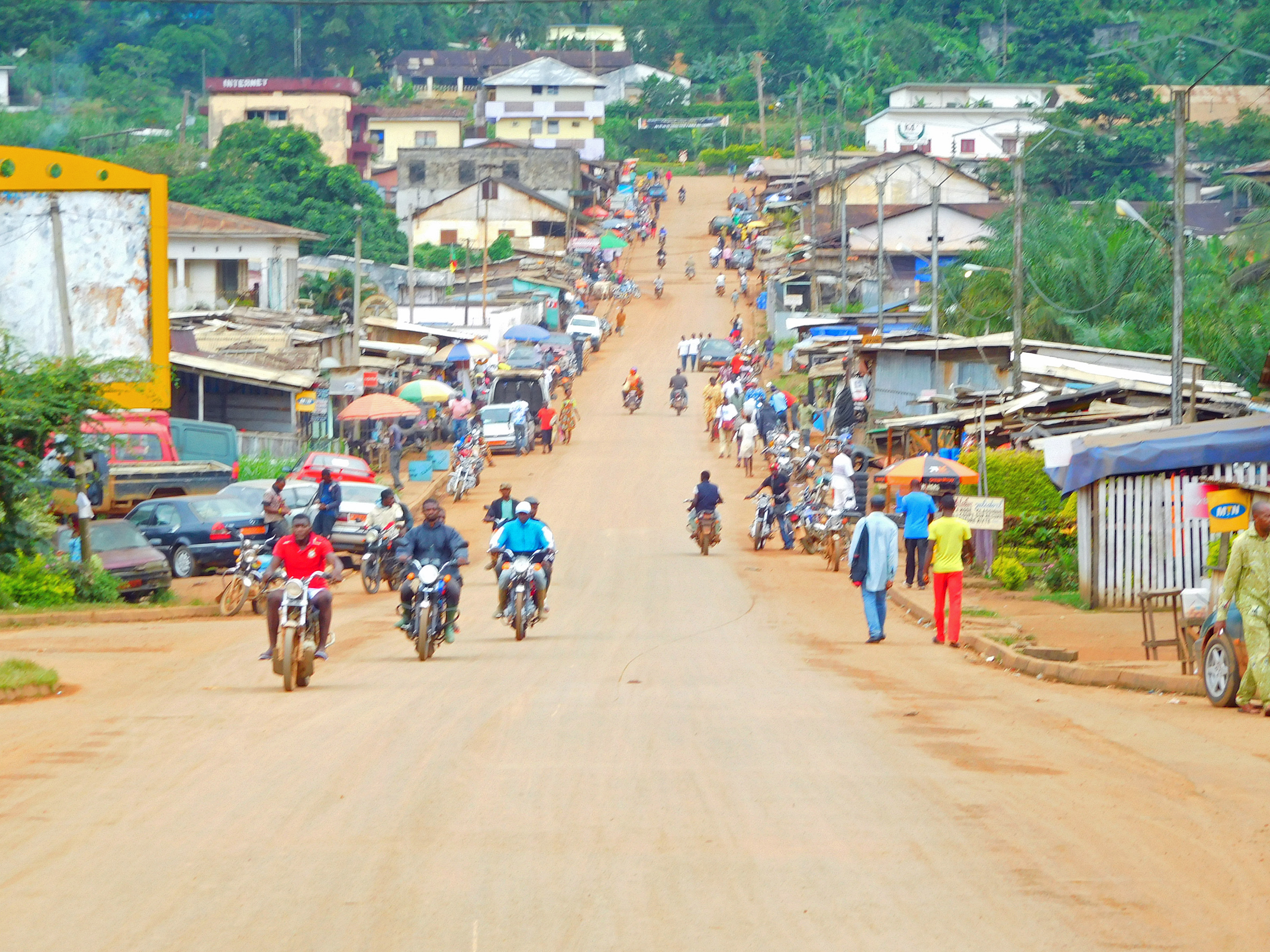
- Éséka main road

- Location in Cameroon
- Coordinates: 3°39′N 10°46′E
- Country: Cameroon
- Province: Centre Province
- Elevation: 804 ft (245 m)

Population (2001)
  - Total: 79,500 (est)

Eséka is a small town in the Centre Region of Cameroon.

== Transport ==
The city of Eséka lies on the main Camrail railway, where the line enters more rugged terrain from the coastal plains.

On 22 October 2016, a passenger train derailed close to the town. The train, traveling from the capital Yaoundé to the economic hub Douala was crammed with people due to road traffic disruption between the two cities and came off the tracks just before reaching Eséka. At least 60 people were killed with many hundreds injured.

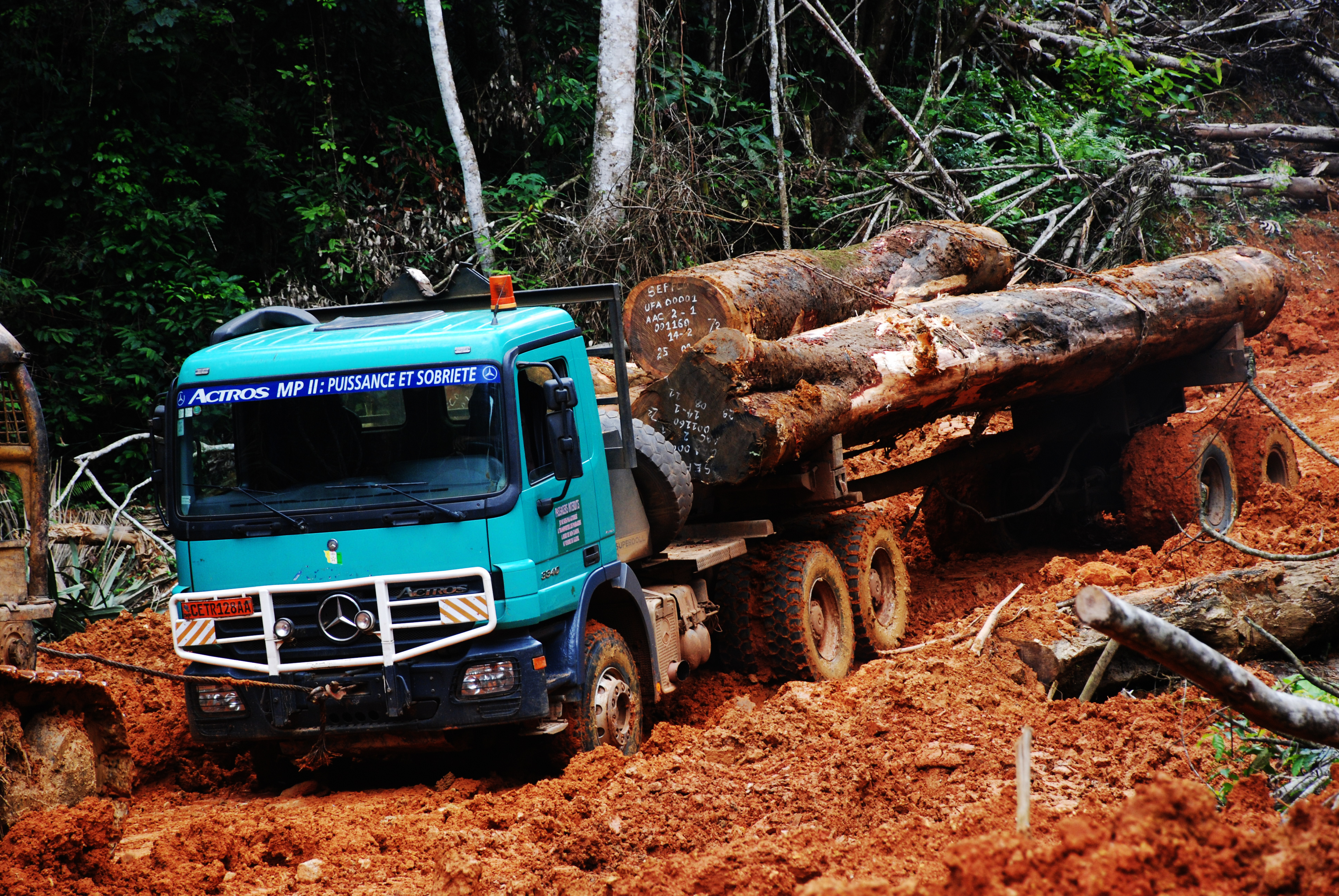
Transport of wood

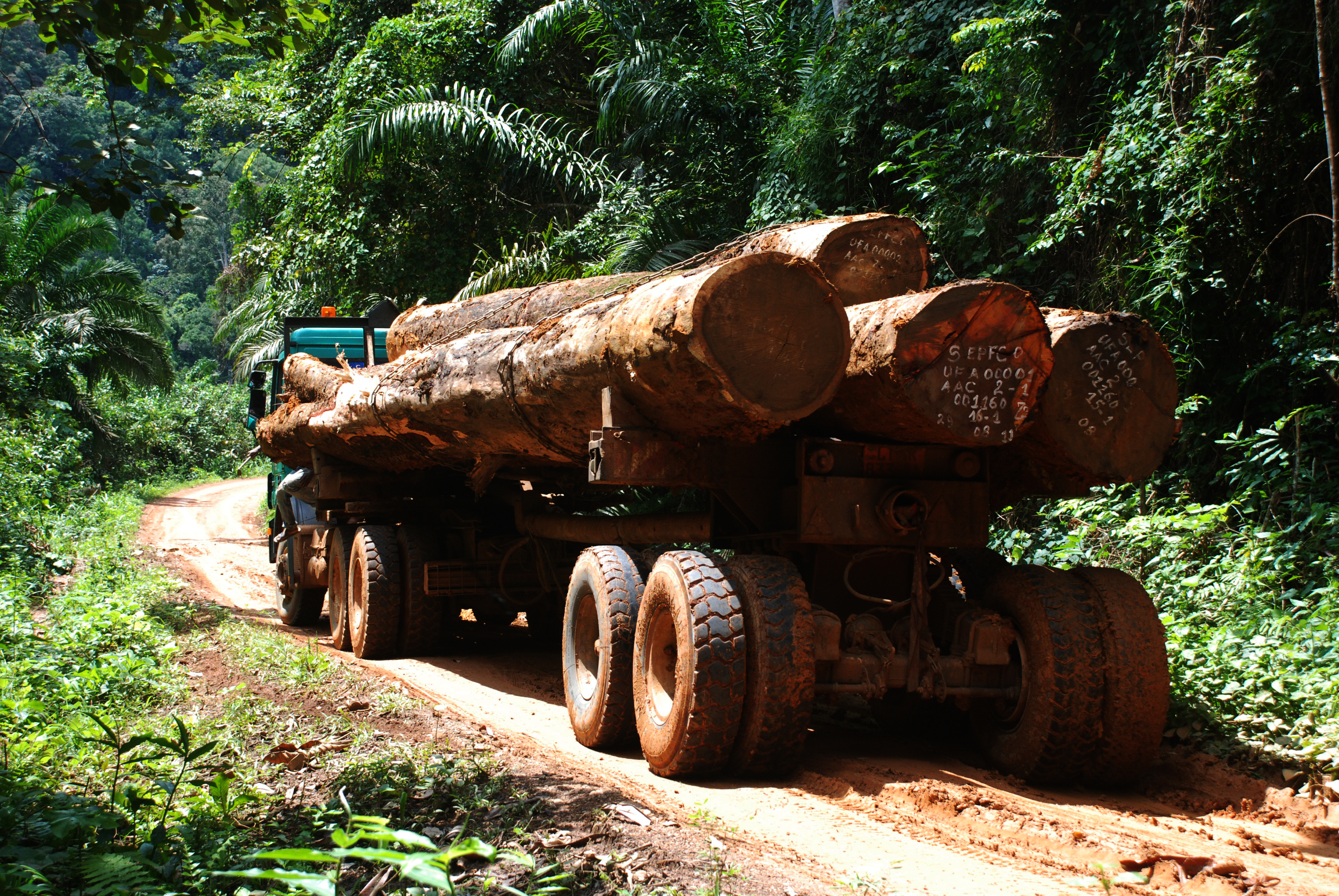
Eséka forest

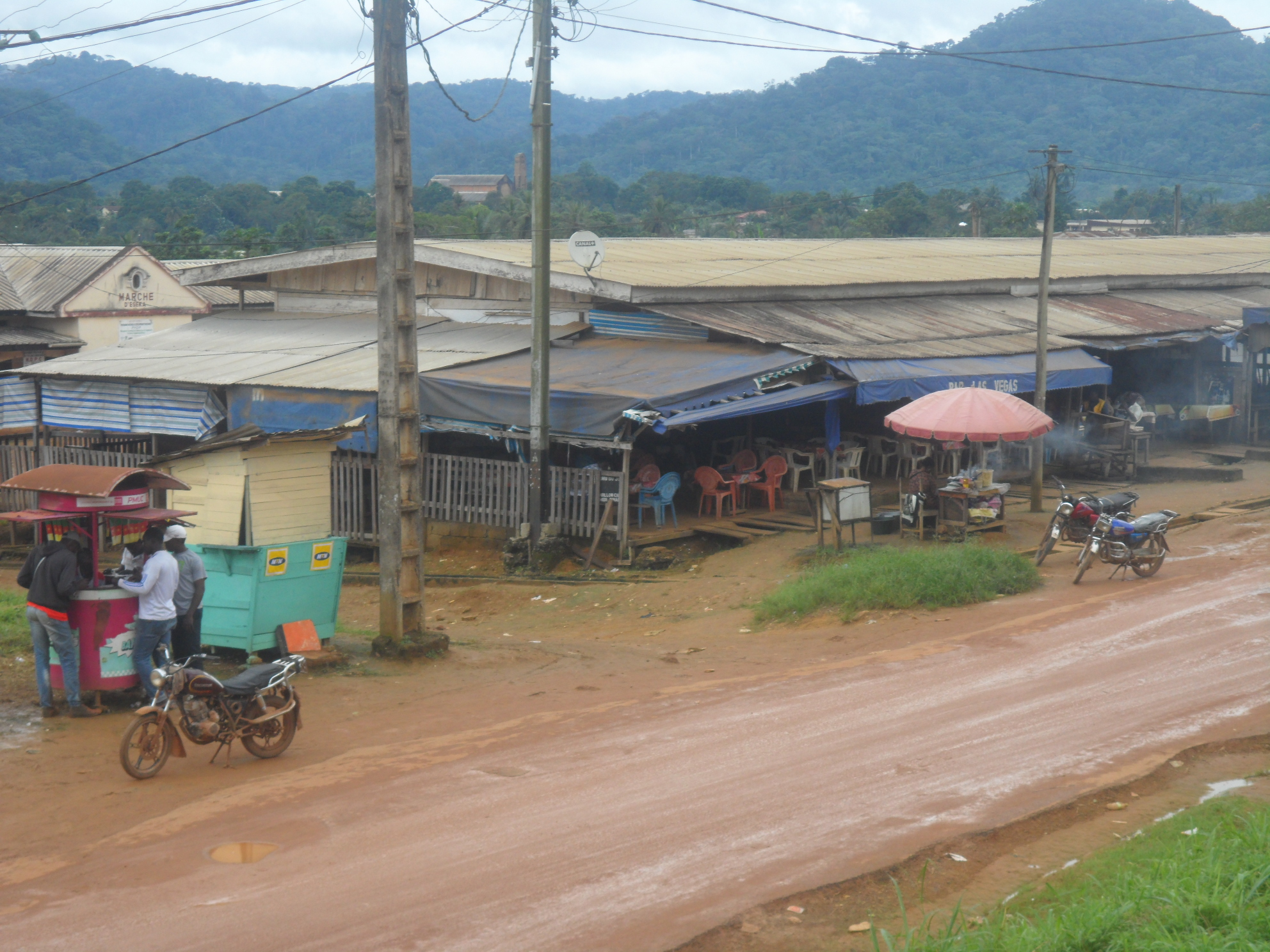
Eséka road

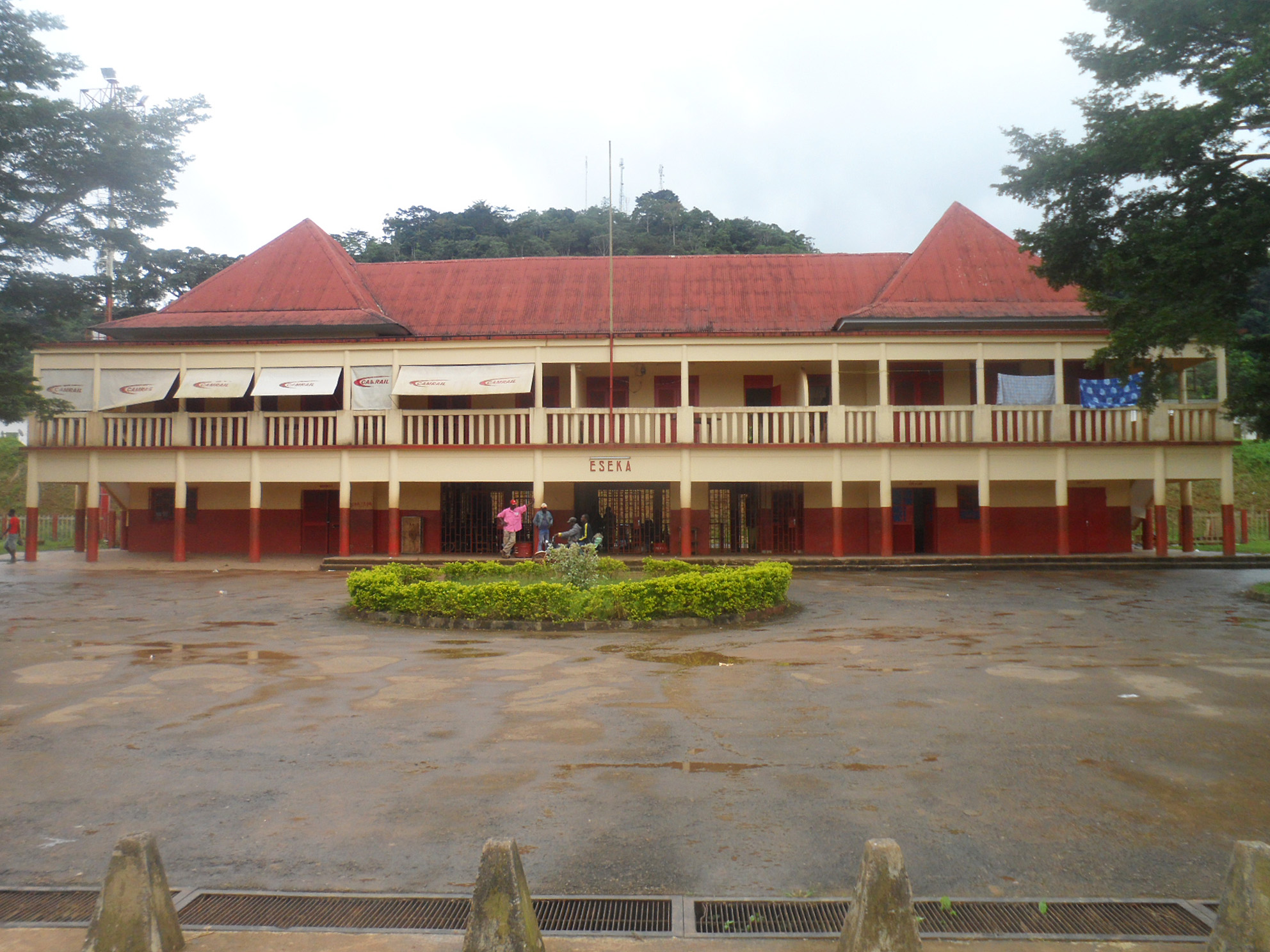
Éséka station

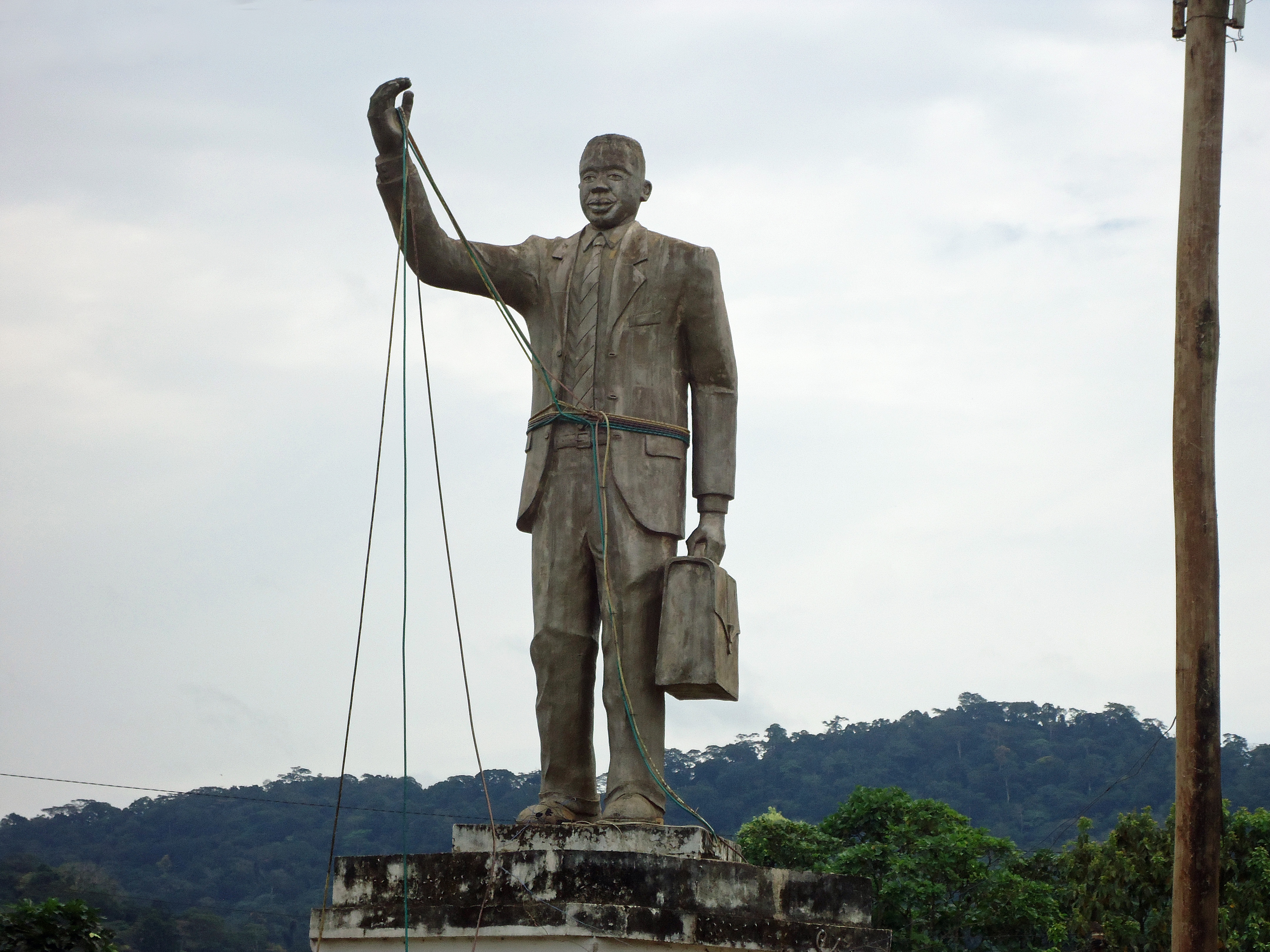
Statue of Ruben Um Nyobe

== See also ==
- Communes of Cameroon
- Railway stations in Cameroon
- Transport in Cameroon
