= Félix-Roland Moumié =

Cameroonian anti-colonialist leader who was assassinated in Geneva

Secretary-General of the Union des Populations du Cameroun
- In office 13 September 1958 – 3 November 1960
- Preceded by: Ruben Um Nyobé
- Succeeded by: Ernest Ouandié

Personal details
- Born: Félix-Roland Moumié; November 1, 1925 Foumban, French Cameroon
- Died: November 3, 1960 (aged 35) Geneva, Switzerland
- Cause of death: Thallium poisoning
- Spouse: Marthe Ekemeyong Moumié
- Profession: Physician, politician
- Known for: Cameroonian independence movement

Félix-Roland Moumié (1 November 1925 – 3 November 1960) was an anti-colonialist Cameroonian leader, assassinated in Geneva on 3 November 1960 by an agent of the SDECE (French secret service) with thallium, following official independence from France earlier that year. Félix-Roland Moumié succeeded Ruben Um Nyobé, who was killed in September 1958, as leader of the Union des Populations du Cameroun (UPC – or also Union du Peuple Camerounais — "Cameroon's People Union").

== Biography ==
Félix Moumié was born in 1925 at the Protestant hospital of Njissé in Foumban, to Samuel Mekou Moumié, evangelist at the Protestant mission, and Suzanne Mvuh. He began his primary studies at the Bandjo school, continued them at the Protestant school in Njissé, then at the public school in Bafoussam (CMI), and completed them at the regional school in Dschang (CMII) where he brilliantly obtained the primary school certificate.

He was sensitized to anti-colonialist and communist ideas during his studies, notably with Gabriel d'Arboussier (the future Secretary General of the African Democratic Rally) and the historian Jean Suret-Canale.

In April 1958, he attended the "Conference of Independent African States" organized by the Ghanaian President Kwame Nkrumah. He befriended Frantz Fanon, who represented the Algerian FLN. Accompanied by Osendé Afana, he went to Congo in 1960 to meet with President Patrice Lumumba, who had shown sympathy for the UPC cause, but who was then overthrown by Colonel Mobutu's troops, who drove them out of the country.

Knowing that he was constantly under surveillance by the French intelligence services, he ensured that he never flew over French territory and avoided the airspace of the countries that were members of the French Community. He feared that his plane would be intercepted, as the plane of Ahmed Ben Bella and FLN leaders was in 1956. He lived mainly between Ghana and Guinea where he sought to gain support for the UPC.

== See also ==
- Colonialism
- List of assassinated anti-colonialist leaders from article Decolonization
- Cameroon's People Union (UPC)
- Jacques Foccart
- Marthe Ekemeyong Moumié
