= Ruben Um Nyobè =

Cameroonian politician

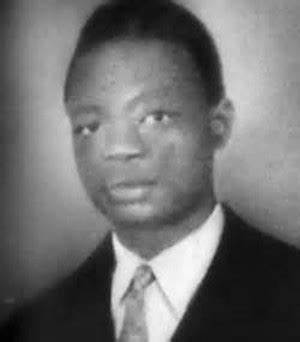
- Official photograph
- Born: 1913; Boumnyebel, Kamerun
- Died: September 13, 1958 (aged 44–45); Nyong-et-Kellé, French Cameroon
- Cause of death: Shooting
- Monuments: Monument Um Nyobe Éséka
- Years active: 1944-1958
- Political party: Union des populations du Cameroun

Ruben Um Nyobè (1913 – 13 September 1958) was an anti-colonialist and nationalist Cameroonian leader, slain by the French army on 13 September 1958, near his natal village of Boumnyebel, in the department of Nyong-et-Kellé in the maquis Bassa.

== Early childhood ==
Um Nyobè, known as the forgotten father of Cameroon, was born in 1913 in Song Mpeck, Kamerun. At the time, Kamerun was a German colony and was divided after World War I between France and the United Kingdom. Um Nyobè came from a family in an agricultural region of Bassa. His father was a traditional priest in their village, where they practiced animism as a form of religion. Um Nyobè, was deemed Christian by many who knew him and acquired his Christian name Ruben after he was baptized. Um Nyobè was educated in Presbyterian schools in the part of the country occupied by France and learned to speak French, Bassa, Bulu, and Do. At the age of 26, he completed his baccalaureate degree at a university in Edea. Shortly after completing his degree, he married his wife, Martha. After his university studies in 1944, he stayed in the city of Edea to pursue his passion in law.

He became a civil servant and became interested in politics at an early age. At the end of the 1930s, he became involved in the Jeunesse camerounaise Française (JeuCaFra), an organisation set up by the French administration to counter Nazi propaganda. After World War II he became involved with the Cercle d'études Marxistes - a Cameroonian Nationalist group launched in Yaoundé by the French teacher and trade unionist Gaston Donnat. The mission of the group was to fight with the same momentum against "Nazism, racism and colonialism". For Um Nyobé it was a turning point: "This is the first time I have sat at a white man's table: I consider it a great event in Cameroon. I will not forget it."

== Trade Union Activity ==
Um Nyobè was initiated into the Confédération générale du travail (CGT), a union that fought against the partition of Cameroon into Anglophone and Francophone regions, in 1947. Due to the efforts of CGT, Um Nyobè and its members began spreading the message of independence and denouncing the Catholic religion which they believed justified and advocated for colonization and slavery. His efforts managed to unite diverse ethnic groups to join the resistance against the French. He was named "Mpodol Ion", which meant speaker of the nation or spokesman in the native language of the people of Bassa. His friends called him Mpodol, which meant "prophet", because they believed it was his biblical mandate to lead and speak as their prophet.

In September 1945, settlers opened fire in Douala on a strike demonstration that eventually turned into a riot. According to the colonial authorities, the official death toll was 8 (and 20 wounded), However this count has been disputed. The ensuing repression against the USCC and its leaders led a new generation of activists to take over the leadership with Um Nyobè becoming general secretary of the union in 1947.

The second major event is the creation of the African Democratic Rally. Um Nyobè was present in Bamako in September 1946 for the first party congress as a representative of the USCC. Back in Cameroon, he worked to create a Cameroonian party following this dynamic, which led to the founding of the Union des populations du Cameroun (UPC) by USCC trade unionists on the night of 10 April 1948 in a café-bar in Douala. If he was not present at the time of the foundation, he was nevertheless propelled to the head in November 1948.

== Umism or the legacy of Ruben Um Nyobé ==
With overt political activism and leadership largely dormant, Um Nyobé emerged from the freedom fighter stance to fill the void of national liberation organizations that were tracked by the French imperialism in Africa. Nyobé's idea was that Cameroon needed a ‘revolution of the mind’, allowing oppressed indigenous Cameroonians to overcome their fear of Europeans. This stance is called Umism, a derivation of the name Um and is expressed by the fact that a potential leader must always place himself as the people's prosecutor. The umiste is first of all nationalist and pan-Africanist animated by a will to plead all the popular demands as well social, cultural and economic aspirations of the voiceless and the poor.

== Engagement in the UPC ==
In 1952 the UPC created the Democratic Union of Cameroonian Women, in particular to combat discrimination specific to women, and a youth organization in 1954, the Jeunesse démocratique du Cameroun. Um Nyobé particularly insisted on "efforts to raise the ideological level of militants and leaders", and party schools were created. On an organizational level, he defended the strengthening of "base committees" to build a party acting from below and preferred to speak of a "movement" rather than a "party" for this reason.

The UPC published three newspapers (La Voix du Cameroun, l'Étoile, and Lumière) largely focused on three main themes: national independence, the reunification of the former German Kamerun and social justice.

Um Nyobè opposed tribalism and its instrumentation by colonialism as a factor of division: "Such a situation requires us to break with outdated tribalism and retrograde regionalism which, now and in the future, represent a real danger for the development of this Cameroonian nation". Opposed to armed struggle and violence, he encouraged his supporters to conduct only peaceful actions such as boycotts, strikes and demonstrations. Most UPC meetings ended with the Cameroonian national anthem and La Marseillaise, while Um Nyobé repeated that he did not confuse "the people of France with the French colonialists".

Um Nyobè made multiple forays in the United Nations both in 1952 and in 1954 speaking on behalf of the people of Cameroon and other colonized African countries. He expressed his view of independence as an appeal to the natives of all countries. As leader of the UPC, he made many gestures of integrity where he refused to negotiate with the French.

Um Nyobè was initially opposed to violence. In 1952, he stated that "the armed struggle was carried out once and for all by the Cameroonians who contributed greatly to the defeat of German fascism. The fundamental freedoms whose application and independence we claim and towards which we must resolutely march are no longer things to be conquered by armed struggle. It is precisely to prevent such a possibility that the United Nations Charter called for the right of peoples to self-determination. Nevertheless, it recognizes the right of peoples to armed struggle elsewhere on the planet, when circumstances so require". He also saluted the "heroic struggles" led by the Vietnamese of Việt Minh and the Algerians of the FLN.

On June 13, 1955, the UPC was banned by the French government and its militants went into hiding. Um Nyobè was killed by the French army on 13 September 1958. After his death, he was replaced by Félix-Roland Moumié. Until the 1990s, any mention of Um Nyobè was prohibited in Cameroon.
