= Union of the Peoples of Cameroon =

Political party in Cameroon

Union of the Peoples of Cameroon Union des Populations du Cameroun
- Abbreviation: UPC
- Secretary-General: Sylvestre LeBell
- Founders: Jacques Ngom; Charles Assalé; Guillaume Hondt; Joseph Raymond Etoundi; Léopold Moumé Etia; Georges Yémi; Théodore Ngosso; Guillaume Bagal; Léonard Bouli; Emmanuel Yap; Jacques-Réné Bidoum; H-R Manga Mado
- Founded: 10 April 1948
- Preceded by: Cameroonian Rally
- Ideology: Marxism–Leninism; Socialism; African nationalism Anti-colonialism; Factions: Pro-Soviet; Maoism
- Political position: Left-wing to Far-left
- Seats in the National Assembly: 0 / 180
- Seats in the Senate: 1 / 100

Party flag

The Union of the Peoples of Cameroon (French: Union des Populations du Cameroun - UPC) is a political party in Cameroon. It was one of the main belligerents in the Cameroon War.

== Foundation ==
The UPC was founded on 10 April 1948, at a meeting in the bar Chez Sierra in Bassa. Twelve men assisted the founding meeting, including Charles Assalé, Léonard Bouli, and Guillaume Bagal. The majority of the participants were trade unionists. In many ways UPC was a continuation of the Cameroonian Rally (RACAM). On 11 April 1948, a Provisional Bureau was established. Bouli was elected general secretary, Bagal joint general secretary, Emmanuel Yap the treasurer and J-R Biboum the joint treasurer. The following day the statutes of UPC were deposited at the Mayor's office in Douala at 10.50 am. The group was, however, not legally registered. On 13 April, UPC issued its first public declaration of intent, the "Appeal to the Cameroonians".

On 6 May, another meeting was held, this time at the residence of Guillaume Bagal in Douala. The statutes and the "Appeal to the Cameroonians" were revised. A new Provisional Bureau was constituted made up of General Secretary: Étienne Libaï; Joint General Secretary: Léonard Bouli; Joint Secretary: Guillaume Bagal; General Treasurer: Emmanuel Yap; Joint Treasurer: Jacques Biboum; Members: Nkoudou Raphaël, Owona Ernest-Marie. On 14 May, the revised statues were handed over to the Mayor's office in Douala. On 9 June the authorities allowed the registration of UPC, following pressure from the Rassemblement Démocratique Africain (RDA) and the French Communist Party (PCF).

On 17 June, the Provisional Bureau decided the UPC would call itself the "Cameroonian section of RDA", and that the first public function of UPC would be held on 22 June in Douala. The meeting of 22 June was held in the Salles de Fêtes d'Akwa and was attended by around 500 people. Libaï and Bouli addressed the function. Participants included Ruben Um Nyobè, Charles Assalé, as well as traditional chiefs such as Ekwalla Essakra and Lobé-Bell. In November, Ruben Um Nyobè took charge of the organization as its general secretary after a vote at a meeting of the Provisional Bureau. Before the meeting of the enlarged Provisional Bureau, Léopold Moumé Etia had been mentioned as another possible candidate for the position, but he declined the nomination on personal grounds. At the second congress of RDA, celebrated in Treichville, Ivory Coast, 1–5 January 1949, membership of the UPC in the RDA was confirmed, and Um Nyobé was elected vice-president of RDA.

Despite his friendly relationship with the PCF, the historian Thomas Deltombe points out that the organization is not a communist party and that it "was above all a fraternity by default. Who else but the communists, in the 1950s, were ready to take a stand for the liberation of the colonized peoples? UPC activists could identify themselves, as individuals, with communist sympathies, but the UPC, as a nationalist movement, was not. "While some of its leaders such as Félix-Roland Moumié or Ernest Ouandié are indeed sensitive to communist ideals, others, notably Ruben Um Nyobè, consider that the UPC must remain neutral on ideological issues to bring together all Cameroonian independence activists.

== Growth ==
On 10 April 1950, the enlarged Leading Committee held a meeting in Dschang. During the course of the meeting a decision is taken to regard the function as the first congress of UPC. The congress lasted until 13 April. A new Leading Committee was elected with President: Chief Mathias Djiomessi; General Secretary: Ruben Um Nyobè; Vice-presidents: Guillaume Bagal, Phillipe Essama Essi, Félix-Roland Moumié, Samuel Noumouwe and Treasurer: Emmanuel Yap. After the congress Charles Assalé left the movement and joined the procolonial fold. The party published the papers La Voix du Cameroun, Lumière, Étoile and Vérité.

After trying a parliamentary vote in 1952 without success, the UPC turned to the United Nations, who had the guardianship of Cameroon, to demand independence and reunification. Under the aegis of Ruben Um Nyobè, the Secretary-General, the party requested of the 4th UN General Assembly supervising committee in December 1952:

- Revision of the trusteeship agreements of 13 December 1946 that were signed without any prior consultation of the people contrary to what was claimed by Louis-Paul Aujoulat and Alexandre Douala Manga Bell, who said '... the trusteeship agreement was subject to widespread distribution, and a very broad debate in Cameroon, it has been approved by the Cameroonian people ..."
- Immediate reunification
- Setting of a date (10 years) to end the trusteeship agreements and provide access to the political independence of Cameroon.

Ruben Um Nyobè proposed that for about ten years before independence there should be a program that would give Cameroons adequate training to assume responsibility for the state arising from independence.

From 1953, in the face of increased repression by the colonial power, the UPC followed the urging of Dr. Félix-Roland Moumié to move into radical political action. According to historian Bernard Droz, China provided weapons to the UPC. Seven years after its founding, in 1955 the Union of the Peoples of Cameroon controlled 460 village or neighborhood committees and 80,000 members, particularly on the coast in central, south and west Cameroon, among the Bamileke and Bassa.

Representatives of the party were invited in 1958 to the "Conference of Independent African States" organized by Ghanaian President Kwame Nkrumah.

=== Youth and women's structures ===
In 1952, the party created a women's branch, the Democratic Union of Cameroonian Women. While the latter is not defined as "feminist", it nevertheless contributes to destabilizing the places generally assigned to women by colonial authorities or traditional leaders, for example by calling for the abolition of laws prohibiting women from taking up certain professions or commercial activities. Its activists send multiple petitions to the United Nations and organize demonstrations challenging the administration.

The Cameroonian Democratic Youth was founded in 1954 and became an important lever for recruiting young activists. It is increasing its contacts with other youth organisations, particularly in Eastern European countries, and participates in conferences abroad. Its leader Hyacinthe Mpaye, who was involved in the French army during the Second World War and a CGT trade unionist, was close to Marxism: he explained what he thought was a necessary alliance between Cameroonians and the French working class. The JDC has a strong autonomy from the UPC.

On the other hand, the UPC considers economic claims to be inseparable from political claims:" the employers are supported by the administration and this administration can only pursue a policy of national oppression in our countries by using economic weapons and material means held in large part by private companies. The UPC considers, and trade union activists agree, that the economic emancipation of our people is impossible without the political achievements necessary for the economic, social and cultural progress of the people.

== Movement in exile ==
In 1954, the new French High Commissioner Roland Pré was determined to liquidate the UPC. The party leaders are gathered in Douala to facilitate their surveillance and carry out judicial harassment against them. Abel Kingué, the vice-president, is thus prosecuted for "contempt of court" for a case dating back to 1951; Pierre Penda, a member of the steering committee, is the subject of five consecutive cases; Félix-Roland Moumié is prosecuted for "defamation and insult"; and Ruben Um Nyobè is convicted of "libelous denunciation". Roland Pré is currently conducting a purge within the judicial system, sending back to France magistrates deemed "too soft" in their repression of the UPC. Cameroonian law enforcement agencies and organizations close to the administration (including the Rassemblement des populations du Cameroun) are mobilized to prevent UPC public meetings and speeches. The control of private correspondence is becoming systematic, while activists' homes are frequently searched.

After the first revolt in May 1955, suppressed by the French colonial authority at the time, the party was dissolved by a decree dated 13 July 1955, and its leaders were forced to go into exile in Kumba in the British Southern Cameroons, then in Cairo, Conakry, Accra and Beijing. On 28 January 1956 the UPC presented its position in a declaration to the international press signed by Félix-Roland Moumié (President), Ruben Um Nyobè (Secretary General) and the two Vice-Presidents, Ernest Ouandié and Abel Kingué. They called for reunification of French- and British-administered areas as an independent state.

Ruben Um Nyobè was killed in the bush on 13 September 1958. Félix-Roland Moumié would be poisoned in Geneva in October 1960, by the French secret service. The UPC continued its armed struggle until the arrest in August 1970 of Ernest Ouandié, who was shot six months later on 15 January 1971. Meanwhile, another leader of UPC, Osendé Afana, was killed in the south-east on 15 March 1966.

== Revival ==
After a long period of hiding, the UPC officially re-surfaced in 1991 with the return to multiparty politics in Cameroon. The party held Congresses more or less unitary in 1991, 1996, 1998, 2002, 2004 and 2007. In 1997 the UPC presented an official candidate for president, Professor Henri Hogbe Nlend. He came second behind the incumbent President Paul Biya. Another attempt to nominate a member of UPC was made in 2004 with Dr. Samuel Mack Kit, but this nomination was rejected by the Supreme Court, ostensibly due to an incomplete application. The UPC has been elected to parliament and ministers to the government of Cameroon until 2007.

== Symbolism ==
The black crab on the national flag chosen by the UPC represented the etymology of the name of Cameroon from Portuguese Camarões. Furthermore, the UPC wanted to revert the name of Cameroon to Kamerun. This was not because they wanted a return to German colonialism but they saw that as a symbol of their goal of a united Cameroon.

== Election results ==
=== Presidential elections ===
Election	Candidate	Votes	'%	Result
1992	Did not participate			
1997	Henri Hogbe Nlend	85,693	2.50%	Lost ✗
2004	Did not participate			
2011	Did not participate			
2018	Did not participate			
2025	Did not participate			

=== National Assembly elections ===
Election	Votes	%	Seats	+/–	Position	Status
1992	189,534	8.87	18 / 180	New	3rd	Opposition
1997	78,452	2.72	1 / 180	▼17	▼4th	Opposition
2002	—	—	3 / 180	▲2	4th	Opposition
2007	43,141	1.38	0 / 180	Steady	▼6th	Extra-parliamentary
2013	68,949	1.71	3 / 180	▲3	6th	Opposition
2020	—	—	0 / 180	▼3	▼7th	Extra-parliamentary

== Bibliography ==
- Meyomesse, Enoh (2009), Le carnet politique de Ruben Um Nyobè (in French), Mpôdol Editions, ISBN 978-0-557-14425-9
