= Arsene Tema Biwole =

Cameroonian physicist and engineer

Arsene Stephane Tema Biwole
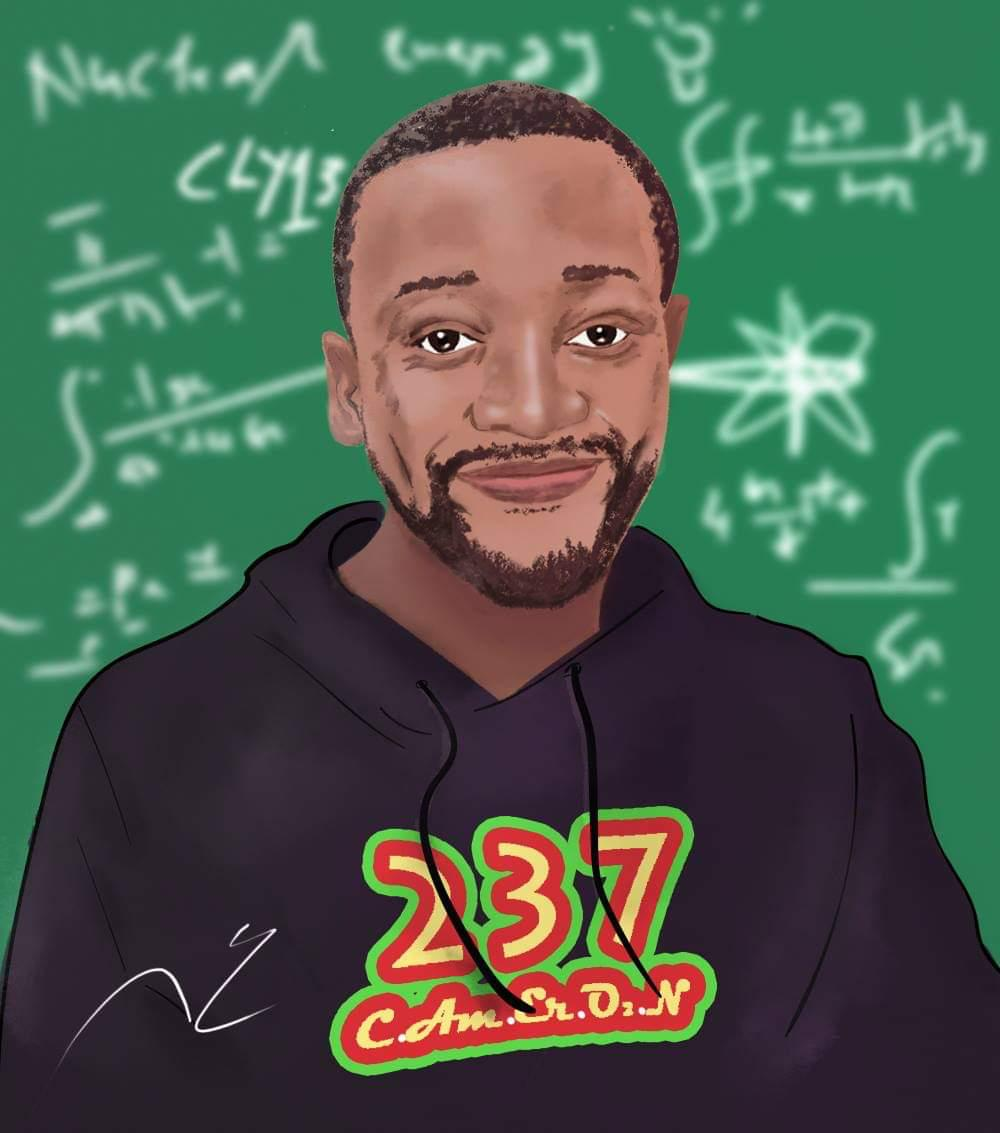
- Illustration of Arsene Tema Biwole. A tribute from the youth of the city of Douala.
- Born: 15 June 1992 (age 34); Bafoussam
- Education: École Polytechnique Fédérale de Lausanne; Polytechnic University of Turin
- Known for: Electron cyclotron emission in tokamaks
- Awards: Knight of the Order of Merit (Cameroon)
- Scientific career
- Fields: Plasma (physics); Nuclear fusion
- Workplaces: Massachusetts Institute of Technology
- Thesis: Measuring the electron energy distribution in tokamak plasmas from polarised electron cyclotron emission
- Doctoral advisor: Ambrogio Fasoli
- Other academic advisors: Anne E. White
- Website: www.arsene-temabiwole.com

Arsene Tema Biwole is a Cameroonian nuclear engineer and plasma physicist at the Massachusetts Institute of Technology (MIT).

== Biography ==
=== Early life an education ===
Arsene Tema Biwole was born on June 15, 1992, at the "Camp Bamoun" - built during German colonisation - in Bafoussam, western Cameroon.

Premature and ill during his childhood, he and his brothers were raised by a single and modest mother. Arsene studied Newtonian physics in science books at home without electricity, using the light of a lamp.

He studied nuclear engineering at the Polytechnic School of Turin, becoming the only Cameroonian engaged in this course.

In April 2017, with a grant from the United States Department of Energy, he continued his research for a Master's thesis in San Diego, California at General Atomics. Thus working in the Fusion Theory Group of this company.

=== Scientific career ===
In 2017, Arsene Tema Biwole participated in the 59th Meeting of the American Physical Society Division of plasma physics with General atomics. Thus becoming the first Cameroonian in history to both join General Atomics and the Division of Plasma Physics of the American physical Society.

He holds a Doctorate in Physics, obtained at the École Polytechnique Fédérale de Lausanne, titled as follows : "Measuring the electron energy distribution in tokamak plasmas from polarized electron cyclotron radiation".

In June 2023, Arsene Tema Biwole joined the Massachusetts Institute of Technology (MIT), to work for the SPARC tokamak, operated by Commonwealth Fusion Systems in collaboration with the Massachusetts Institute of Technology (MIT) Plasma Science and Fusion Center (PSFC).

=== Honors and distinctions ===
Arsene Tema Biwole was cited by Jeune Afrique in 2018, as one of the most promising African scientists.

In 2020, Arsene Tema Biwole won the Youth Excellence Prize in Cameroon and is designated Ambassador of the Youth Connekt Cameroon project.

During a popular poll carried out by the online information platform Afrik-inform, Arsene Tema Biwole was designated as the favorite Cameroonian personality in the diaspora for the year 2020.

From January to February 2021, he travelled through high schools and universities in Cameroon to promote science and encourage vocations among the youth.

On February 10, 2021, Arsene Tema Biwole was cited by Paul Biya, President of the Republic of Cameroon, as a role model for the youth.

In February 2021, Arsene Tema Biwole received, during a public address, congratulations and encouragement from Maurice Kamto for his ambitions and projects for Africa and Humanity.

Arsene Tema Biwole was the guest of "Actualités Hebdo", a weekly news program of CRTV on February 14, 2021. During the program, Arsene discussed the nuclear perspectives in Africa and the issue of electrification in Cameroon.

In March 2023, Arsene Tema Biwole defended his Doctorate thesis in physics at the École Polytechnique Fédérale de Lausanne. Thesis which was unanimously proposed by the jury for the EPFL Doctoral program thesis prize.

== Honors ==
- EPFL Doctoral Program Thesis Distinction, 2023, Nominee.
- Excellence in Africa Ambassador of the Federal Polytechnic School of Lausanne.
- Knight of the Order of Cameroonian Merit by decree of August 31, 2021, signed by the President of the Republic of Cameroon.
- Banca Sella research award, 2016.
- EDISU Piemonte super merit student prize, 2012.
- Politecnico di Torino Distinguished academic achievement award, 2012.

== See also ==
- Henri Hogbe Nlend
