= Catholic Institute of Bafoussam =

- Institut Catholique de Bafoussam
- Established: June 2015
- Affiliations: Catholic Church
- Location: Bafoussam, Cameroon
- Website: Official website

The Catholic Institute of Bafoussam (ICAB or ICABAF) is a higher education institution in Cameroon located in Bafoussam (the capital of the West region).

== Overview ==
Founded in June 2015, the Catholic Institute of Bafoussam is part of the Diocese of Bafoussam. The institute offers courses in industrial and technological fields as well as in economic and commercial disciplines.

It offers the following degrees:

- BTS
- Professional License
- Professional Master's
- Engineering
