= VTF =

VTF may refer to

- Versatile Toroidal Facility
- The United Kingdom's Vaccine Taskforce
