= Ambrogio Fasoli =

Swiss nuclear physicist

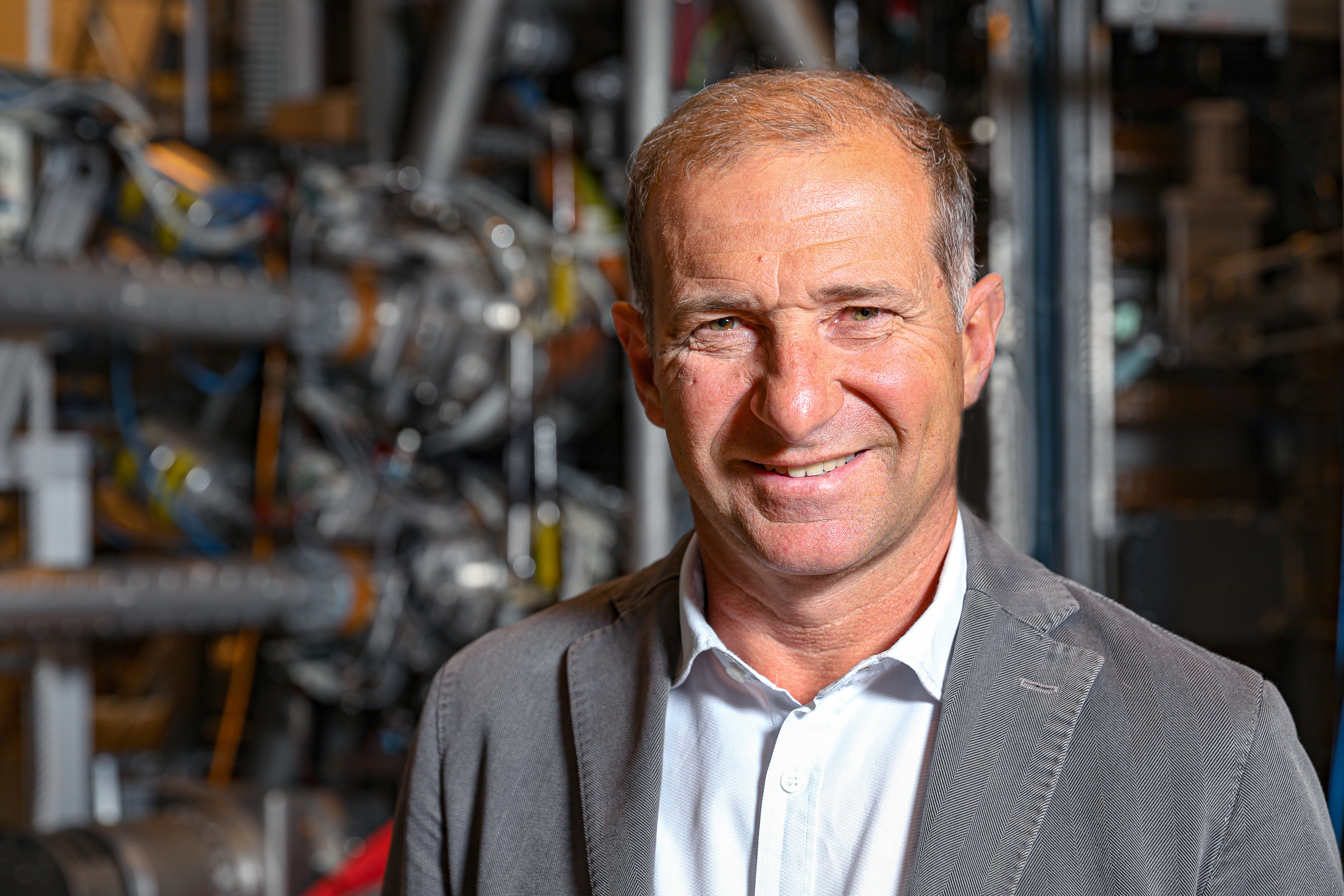
- Vice President for Academic Affairs École Polytechnique Fédérale de Lausanne (EPFL) Director of the Swiss Plasma Center
- Born: 10 November 1964 (age 61)
- Known for: Director of the Swiss Plasma Center
- Scientific career
- Fields: Plasma physics Nuclear fusion
- Workplaces: École Polytechnique Fédérale de Lausanne (EPFL)
- Website: https://www.epfl.ch/research/domains/swiss-plasma-center/

Ambrogio Fasoli (born 10 November 1964 in Milan) is a researcher and professor working in the field of fusion and plasma physics. Since January 2025, he is Vice President for Academic Affairs at École Polytechnique Fédérale de Lausanne (EPFL). He was Associate Vice President for Research at EPFL since 2021.

A Fellow of the American Physical Society, he is Director of the Swiss Plasma Center, located at EPFL. Since 1 January 2019, he chairs the European consortium EUROfusion, the umbrella organisation for the development of nuclear fusion power in Europe.

From 2014 through 2020, he was also Editor-in-Chief of Nuclear Fusion, the peer-reviewed scientific journal of the International Atomic Energy Agency (IAEA). Fasoli represents Switzerland on the Governing Board of Fusion For Energy, the agency that manages Europe's contributions to the international fusion reactor project ITER.

== Career ==
Fasoli graduated from the University of Milan, (in physics, 1988) and from EPFL, the Swiss Federal Institute of Technology in Lausanne (PhD in Science, 1993, EPFL best thesis award). He went on to do his post-doctoral research on JET, the world's largest fusion reactor, participating in 1997 in the experiments that still hold the record for fusion power generated for peaceful purposes by a plasma on earth.

He joined the Physics Department of the Massachusetts Institute of Technology (MIT) as tenure track assistant professor in 1997. At MIT, he led the plasma physics research group and coordinated the international scientific collaboration between MIT and JET.

In 2001, he joined the EPFL Faculty of Basic Sciences, then became associate professor, before being appointed full professor in physics in 2008. In 2007, he was appointed executive director of the Centre de Recherches en Physique des Plasmas (CRPP), of which he became director in 2013, and which became the Swiss Plasma Center in 2015 Fasoli was responsible for several years for EPFL's TCV Tokamak, one of the national facilities in Europe participating in the research for the international reactor ITER

In 2008, Fasoli was elected as a Fellow of the American Physical Society. Since 2001, he has been a visiting professor in the Department of Physics at MIT

From 2010 through 2014, he was the Head of Physics Strategic Committee, and a member of the Directorate of the EPFL Basic Science Faculty. Since 1 January 2019, he is the chair of the European consortium EUROfusion, the umbrella organization of Europe's fusion laboratories.

He has developed a Massive open online course (MOOC) dedicated to fusion and plasma physics, with several thousand registrations each year.

=== Scientific contributions ===
Fasoli works in the areas of basic plasma physics, burning plasma physics, and tokamak physics. At the Swiss Plasma Center, located at EPFL (the Swiss Federal Institute of Technology in Lausanne), he has founded and led the basic plasmas research group, and built the TORPEX facility. He was responsible for the TCV tokamak, the experimental fusion reactor, for several years. plasma physics and nuclear fusion.

At MIT, (1997-2001), he founded and led the plasma physics research group, constructing the Versatile Toroidal Facility (VTF) experiment to study the physics of magnetic reconnection, and coordinated the international scientific collaboration between MIT and JET.

As a researcher at JET, he initiated a series of experiments on the interaction between plasma particles and Alfvén waves, of interest to fusion reactor plasmas. He participated in 1997 in the experiments that still hold the record for fusion power generated for peaceful purposes by a plasma on earth

== Selected works ==
- Tema Biwole, A.; Porte, L.; Fasoli, A.; Figini, L.; Decker, J.; Hoppe, M.; Cazabonne, J.; Votta, L.; Simonetto, A.; Coda, S. (2024). "Cross-Calibration and First Vertical ECE Measurement of Electron Energy Distribution in the TCV Tokamak". Plasma Physics and Controlled Fusion. arXiv:2407.18780. doi:10.1088/1361-6587/ad88a0.
- Tema Biwole, A.; Porte, L.; Coda, S.; Fasoli, A. (2023). "Vertical electron cyclotron emission diagnostic on the tokamak à configuration variable". Review of Scientific Instruments. 94 (10). doi:10.1063/5.0156000.
- Tema Biwole, A.; Porte, L.; Fasoli, A.; Simonetto, A.; D'Arcangelo, O. (2021). "Performance of a high vacuum, high temperature compatible millimeter-range viewing dump for the vertical ECE experiment on TCV". Fusion Engineering and Design. 162 (1) 112079. doi:10.1016/j.fusengdes.2020.112079.
- Micheletti, P.; Baquero Ruiz, M.; Manke, F.; Furno, I.; Ricci, P.; Fasoli, A.; Bowen, P.; Morais, C.; Zhao, W. (2020). "Cathodoluminescent screen imaging system for seeded blob detection in toroidal plasma experiment". Review of Scientific Instruments. 91 (5): 053501. Bibcode:2020RScI...91e3501M. doi:10.1063/1.5123038. PMID 32486748. S2CID 219053408.
- Fasoli, Ambrogio; Furno, Ivo; Ricci, Paolo (2019). "The role of basic plasmas studies in the quest for fusion power" (PDF). Nature Physics. 15 (9): 872–875. Bibcode:2019NatPh..15..872F. doi:10.1038/s41567-019-0622-5. S2CID 199435782.
- Fasoli, A.; Reimerdes, H.; Alberti, S.; Baquero-Ruiz, M.; Duval, BP.; Havlikova, E.; Karpushov, A.; Moret, JM.; Toussaint, M.; Elaian, H.; Silva, M.; Theiler, C.; Vaccaro, D. (2020). "TCV heating and divertor upgrades". Nuclear Fusion. 60 016019 (1): 016019. Bibcode:2020NucFu..60a6019F. doi:10.1088/1741-4326/ab4c56. S2CID 209969620.
- Fasoli, A.; Brunner, S.; Cooper, W.A.; Graves, J.P.; Ricci, P.; Sauter, O.; Villard, L. (2016). "Computational challenges in magnetic-fusion plasma physics". Nature Physics. 12 (5): 411. doi:10.1038/nphys3744. S2CID 15825593.
- Manke, F.; Baquero-Ruiz, M.; Furno, I.; Chellaï, O.; Fasoli, A.; Ricci, P. (2019). "Truncated Lévy motion through path integrals and applications to nondiffusive suprathermal ion transport". Physical Review E. 100 (52122) 052122. Bibcode:2019PhRvE.100e2122M. doi:10.1103/PhysRevE.100.052122. PMID 31869979. S2CID 209461247.
- Testa, D.; Carfantan, H.; Albergante, M.; Blanchard, P.; Bourguignon, S.; Fasoli, A.; Goodyear, A.; Klein, A.; Lister, JB.; Panis, T. (2016). "Sparse representation of signals: from astrophysics to real-time data analysis for fusion plasmas and system optimization analysis for ITER and TCV" (PDF). Plasma Physics and Controlled Fusion. 58 (12) 123001. Bibcode:2016PPCF...58l3001T. doi:10.1088/0741-3335/58/12/123001. S2CID 126050419.
- Zimbardo, G.; Amato, E.; Bovet, A.; Effenberger, F.; Fasoli, A.; Fichtner, H.; Furno, I.; Gustafson, K.; Ricci, P.; Perri, S. (2015). "Superdiffusive transport in laboratory and astrophysical plasmas". Journal of Plasma Physics. 81 (6). Bibcode:2015JPlPh..81f4901Z. doi:10.1017/S0022377815001117. S2CID 16216475.
- Nespoli, F.; Labit, B.; Furno, I.; Canal, GP.; Fasoli, A.and team TCV (2015). "Heat loads in inboard limited L-mode plasmas in TCV". Journal of Nuclear Materials. 463: 393–396. Bibcode:2015JNuM..463..393N. doi:10.1016/j.jnucmat.2014.11.137.

== Awards and honours ==
- Polysphère, EPFL (the Swiss Federal Institute of Technology) best teacher's award (2008 and 2014)
- Fellow of American Physical Society (2008)
- Marie Curie Fellowship, as host of Dr. P.Ricci (2006)
- Marie Curie Fellowship, as host of Dr. M.McGrath (2002)
- Swiss National Science Foundation Professeur Boursier (2001)
- US Department of Energy - Plasma Physics Junior Faculty Award (2000)
- MIT Charles Reed Faculty Award (1999)
- EPFL best thesis Award (1993)
