= Guy Kouemou =

German Aerospace -Engineer and Inventor

Dr. Guy Kouemou
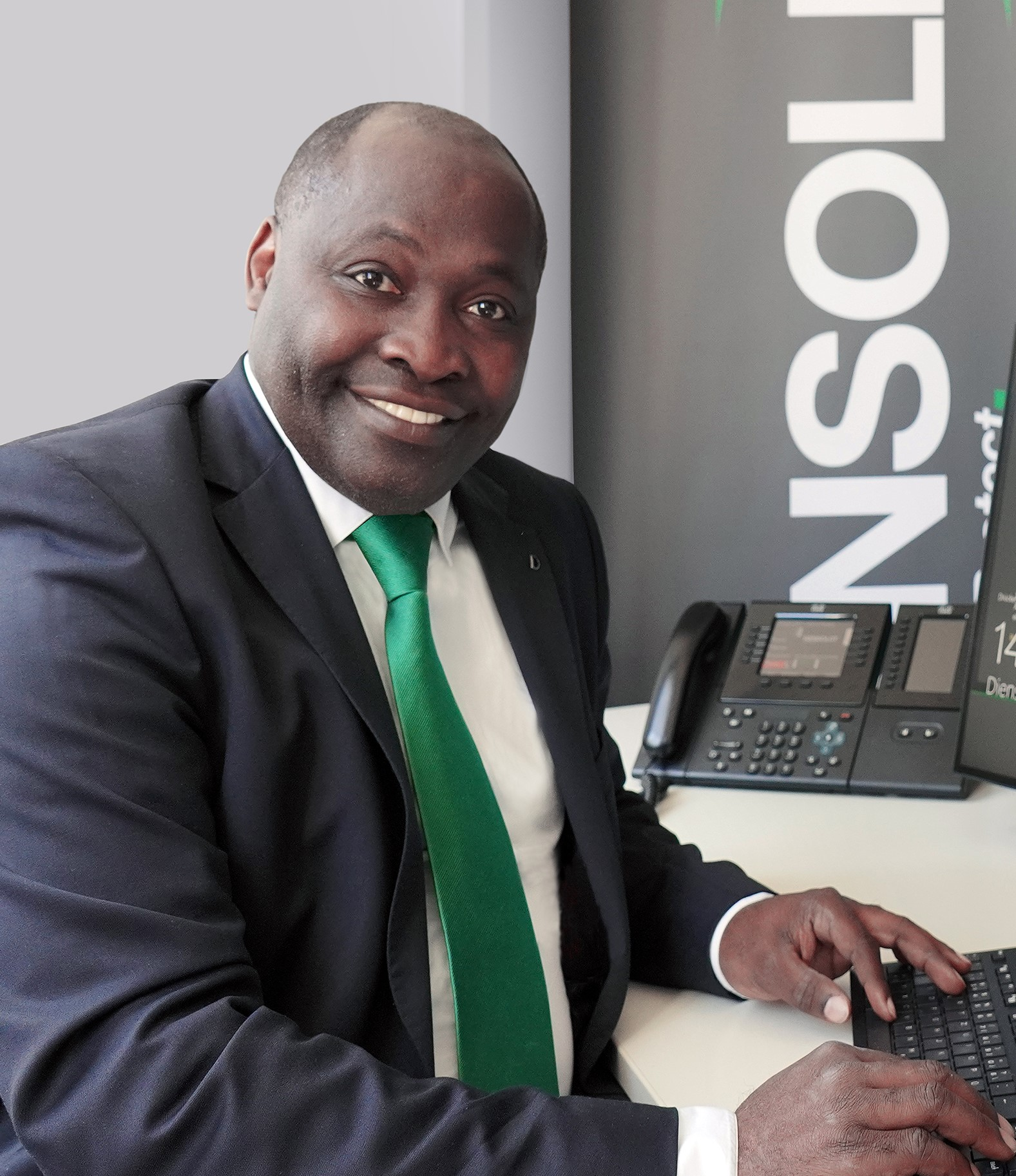
- Born: Guy Leonard Mbotchoua Kouemou; 15 January 1970 (age 56)
- Citizenship: German

Guy Kouemou (born 15 January 1970 in Bafoussam, Cameroon) is a Camerounian-German aerospace engineer and inventor, and the Deputy Chairman of the Technical Committee Radar Technology of the DGON German Society for Navigation and Positioning.

== Biography ==
=== Childhood, education and beginnings ===
Born in January 15, 1970 at Bafoussam Cameroon, Kouemou is a German citizen of Cameroonian origin. He comes from the Bamileke royal house and is the king's representative of the Bangwa. Dr. Kouemou is an art collector and currently chairman of the supervisory board of the Bangwa Ethnological Museum in Cameroon and the negotiator of the Bangwa.

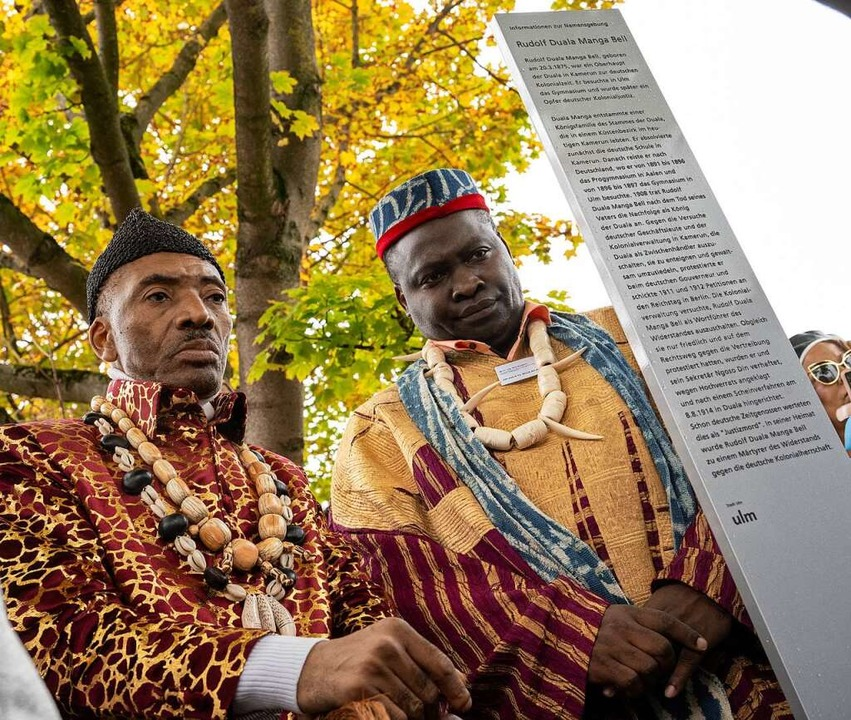
Inauguration Rudolf-Duala-Manga-Bell memorial site Ulm

=== Traditional responsibilities ===
Kouemou demonstrates his engagement for the population of Cameroon and Equatorial Guinea, by investing his personal fortune to build hygienic and modern clinics in Cameroon. Kouemou was present at the inauguration of Rudolf Duala Manga Bell, where he inaugurated a memorial site for Manga Bell in Ulm, together with King Jean-Yves Eboumbou Douala Bell.

=== Career ===
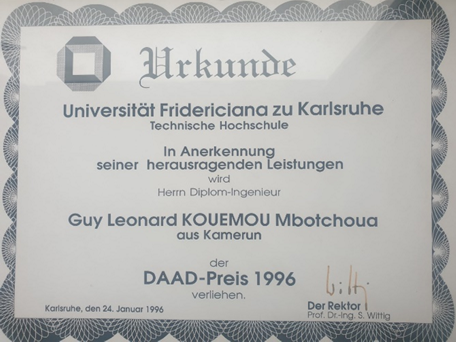

==== Education ====
Having attended high school at the Lycee Joss de Douala, Kouemou attended studies of electrical engineering at the University of Karlsruhe with a focus on biocybernetics and bio-medical technology at KIT and TU Karlsruhe, Fridericiana from 1989 to 1995. He is the laureate of the German Academic Exchange Service of KIT 1996, and he was awarded a PhD in electrical engineering and information technology with a focus on artificial intelligence, hidden Markov models and neural networks.

Dr. Kouemou is noted as one of the first Afro-Germans with a migration background (not born in Germany, other mother tongue, grown in a different language area) to study electrical engineering entirely in German in Germany, having studied and obtained a doctorate in the German language. He received a statement by President Gerhard Selmayr of the university in the context of the DAAD award ceremony in Karlsruhe.

==== Cultural Activities ====
Dr. Kouemou is involved in cultural associations with a focus on intercultural understanding. Thus, he is honorary board member and co-founder (2000) of the German-African cultural association MAMY-Afrika e.V. In his role as the king's representative of the Bangwa, he is also the contact person and representative of the Bangwa peoples in the matter of the handling or return of African art objects in close coordination with the Humboldt Forum in Berlin. Furthermore, Dr. Guy Leonard Kouemou is also working with Cameroonian and African works of art, and supports a sustainable manner of returning the pieces which were initially taken away during colonialism.

=== Family ===
- Sister: Solange Kouemou (Professor Mathematics, FIU Florida, Miami)

== Organizations and Business Activities ==
Dr. Guy Kouemou has been a member of the Catholic academic student association Unitas since 1988, inducted in December 1988 at the Unitas Guelfia in Munich. He joined the Unitas Franco-Alemannia in Karlsruhe in 1989, where he accepted various positions. In his time as a senior board member, he served as co-senior or Katholikentag co-senior. He maintains good contacts with the association as a member of the Unitas old gentry. He serves as the Deputy Chairman of the Technical Committee Radar Technology of the DGON German Society for Navigation and Positioning.

Owner and managing partner of the medical technology companies

- Dr. Guy Kouemou owner of the medical technology companies IPTASYS GmbH, and SleepDoctor Quantum GmbH
- Since 2001, Dr. Guy Kouemou in aerospace
- 2001 joined the EADS (European Aeronautical Defense and Space Company) as a radar system engineer
- 2012 Technology Director Airbus Defense Sensor
- 2014: "Top Ten German Future Prize, Federal President's Prize for Technology and Innovation" (Director of the "Passive Radar" technology program at Airbus Defense and Space)

Since 2017, Technology Director at HENSOLDT.

•

• As part of this activity, Dr. Kouemou with a jury consisting of renowned German professors as well as experts from the industry for years the nationwide student competition awards for the best students nationwide in the fields of aerospace, sensor technology, security technology, radar technology, mathematics, physics and computer science

• Artikel 1

• Artikel 2

• As part of the HENSOLDT Technology Coordinator, Dr. Guy Kouemou is the project coordinator of the Horyzn initiative with the Technical University of Munich as the main sponsor,

=== Books, inventions, aerospace publications ===
- Editor of the book Radar Technology, with over eighty-five thousand downloads, according to IntechOpen, it is one of the most widely read "downloaded" radar books in the world today.
- Author / co-author of several inventions, publications in the field of aerospace
- Patent
- Link 3
- "Hidden Markov Models, Theory and Applications".
- Support of various activities to strengthen the international radar technology community

=== Inventions, publications medical technology ===
- Dr. Guy Kouemou is the inventor of the product family and product brand SleepDoctor as well as supporting patents and inventions. For the development of these products, innovation prizes and funding have been won by various federal / state ministries in recent years. The product is currently being presented, traded and further developed as a strong technology for combating the COVID pandemic and its consequences in Germany and abroad.
- Patent 2
- Patent 3
- SleepDoctor Functioning
- The SleepDoctor technology was developed as part of a case study as part of the Quartet project, which won the first Federal Participation Award in 2021 with Habila GmbH

=== Culture: Promotion of intercultural activities through African & Caribbean dance and music teachers ===
- As part of his other intercultural activities, Dr. Guy Leonard Kouemou, also known as "Leo Kouemou". In this regard, he has been working as a dance and music teacher for around 20 years, especially at the Ulm Adult Education Center (https://www.vhulm.de/fileadmin/content/programm/20212022/VHU_PROGRAMMHEFT-HERBST-WINTER_2021- 2022.pdf) and in the International Federation of Germany, where he tries in this way to contribute to international understanding between people of different origins and cultures as well as age groups through music & dance.
- There he acts in particular as a lecturer for the dances Salsa, Merengue, African dances and drum teacher of the African percussion.
- Cooking together is always part of the agenda.
