= Anne E. White =

American physicist

Anne Elisabeth White is an American plasma physicist whose research focuses on magnetic confinement fusion, particularly on measuring turbulence in the flow of plasma in a tokamak, and on the comparison of experimental results to simulations based on gyrokinetics. She works at the Massachusetts Institute of Technology as School of Engineering Distinguished Professor of Engineering in the Department of Nuclear Science and Engineering and as associate vice president for research administration.

== Education and career ==
White grew up in Yuma, Arizona as the daughter of two lawyers, competed in track and field in high school, and became her school's valedictorian. She graduated from the University of Arizona in 2003 with a double major in physics and applied mathematics, and went to the University of California, Los Angeles for graduate study in physics. There, she received a master's degree in 2004, and completed her Ph.D. in 2008.

She joined the Massachusetts Institute of Technology (MIT) in 2009, and was named head of the Department of Nuclear Science and Engineering in 2019. She held that position until 2023, until being named as associate vice president for research administration.

== Recognition ==
White was the 2014 recipient of the Katherine Weimer Award for Women in Plasma Science of the American Physical Society Division of Plasma Physics, given "for fundamental contributions to the understanding of turbulent transport in tokamaks through development and application of electron cyclotron emission diagnostics and insightful comparison of plasma fluctuations with gyrokinetic simulation predictions". She was one of two 2014 recipients of the David J. Rose Excellence in Fusion Engineering Award of Fusion Power Associates.

She was named as a Fellow of the American Physical Society in 2019, "for outstanding contributions and leadership in understanding turbulent electron heat transport in magnetically confined fusion plasmas via diagnostic development, novel experimentation, and validation of nonlinear gyrokinetic codes".
