= Bafoussam =

Capital and largest city of the West region, Cameroon

Bafoussam Fu'sap
- Communauté Urbaine
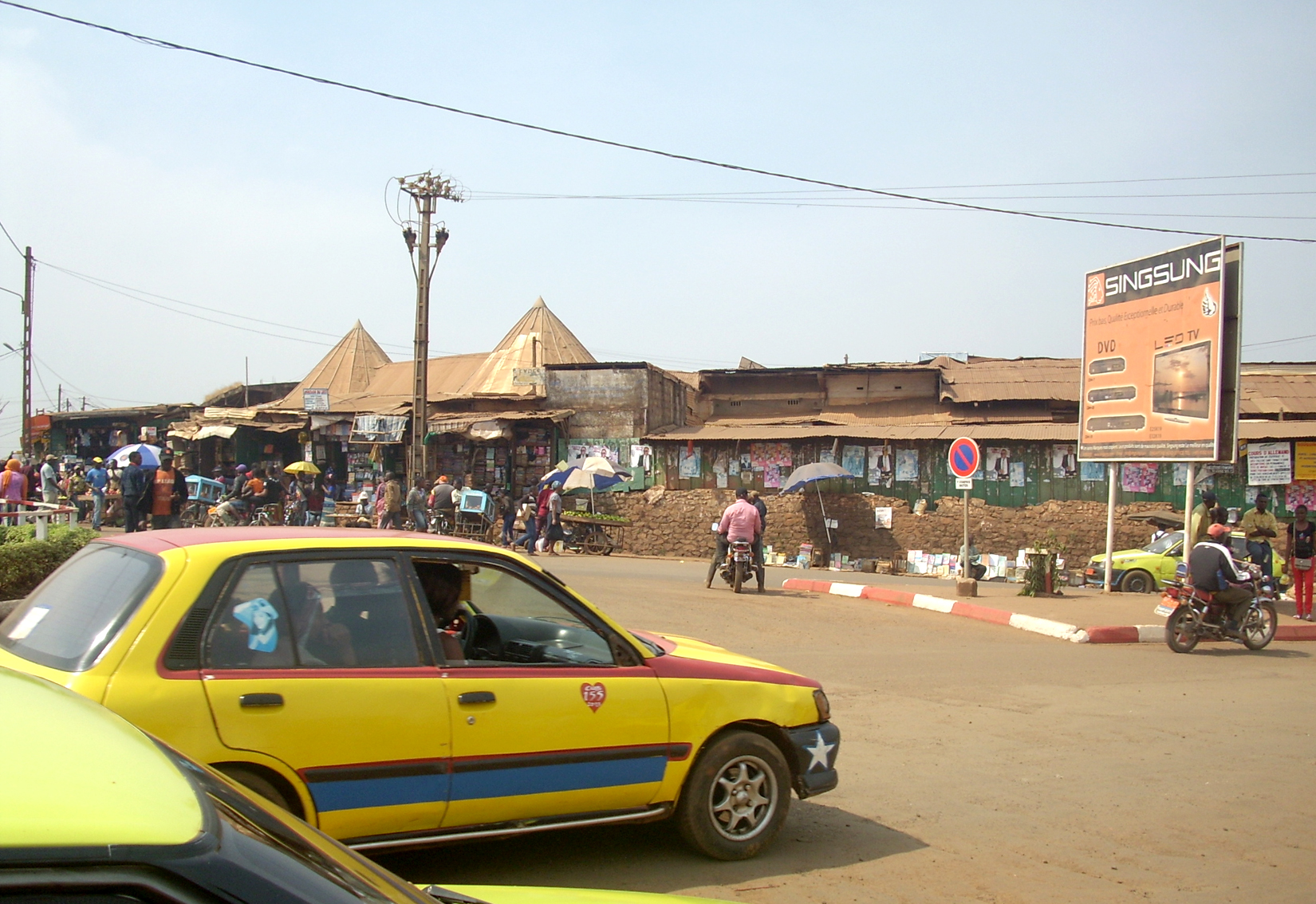
- Bafoussam town centre

- Location in Cameroon Bafoussam (Africa)
- Coordinates: 5°28′N 10°25′E
- Country: Cameroon
- Region: West
- Department: Mifi
- Settled: 14th Century
- Incorporated (Town): 1926
- Incorporated (city): 2008

Government
  - Government Delegate (Délégué du Gouvernement): Nzété Emmanuel

Area
  - Communauté Urbaine: 402 km^{2} (155 sq mi)
  - Urban: 91 km^{2} (35 sq mi)
- Elevation: 1,521 m (4,990 ft)

Population (2023)
  - Communauté Urbaine: 1,146,000 (estimate)
  - Density: 2,865/km^{2} (7,420/sq mi)
  - Urban: 600,000 (estimate)
  - Urban density: 6,593/km^{2} (17,080/sq mi)
  - Metro: 1,146,000 (estimate)
  - Major ethnic group: Bamileke
  - Religions: Bamileke Religion Christianity Islam
- Time zone: UTC+1 (West Africa Time)
- Website: cubafoussam.cm

Bafoussam is the capital and largest city of the West Region of Cameroon, in the Bamboutos Mountains. It is the 3rd most important (financially) city in Cameroon, after Yaoundé and Douala. The communauté urbaine (Urban Community) of Bafoussam, is a decentralized territorial collectivity. Originally called Urban Commune of Bafoussam, the communauté urbaine (Urban Community) of Bafoussam, was born after the Presidential Decree N ° 2008/022 of January 17, 2008 and composed of three communes, namely: the Commune of Bafoussam I (Bafoussam proper), the Commune of Bafoussam II (Baleng) and the Commune of Bafoussam III (Bamougoum).

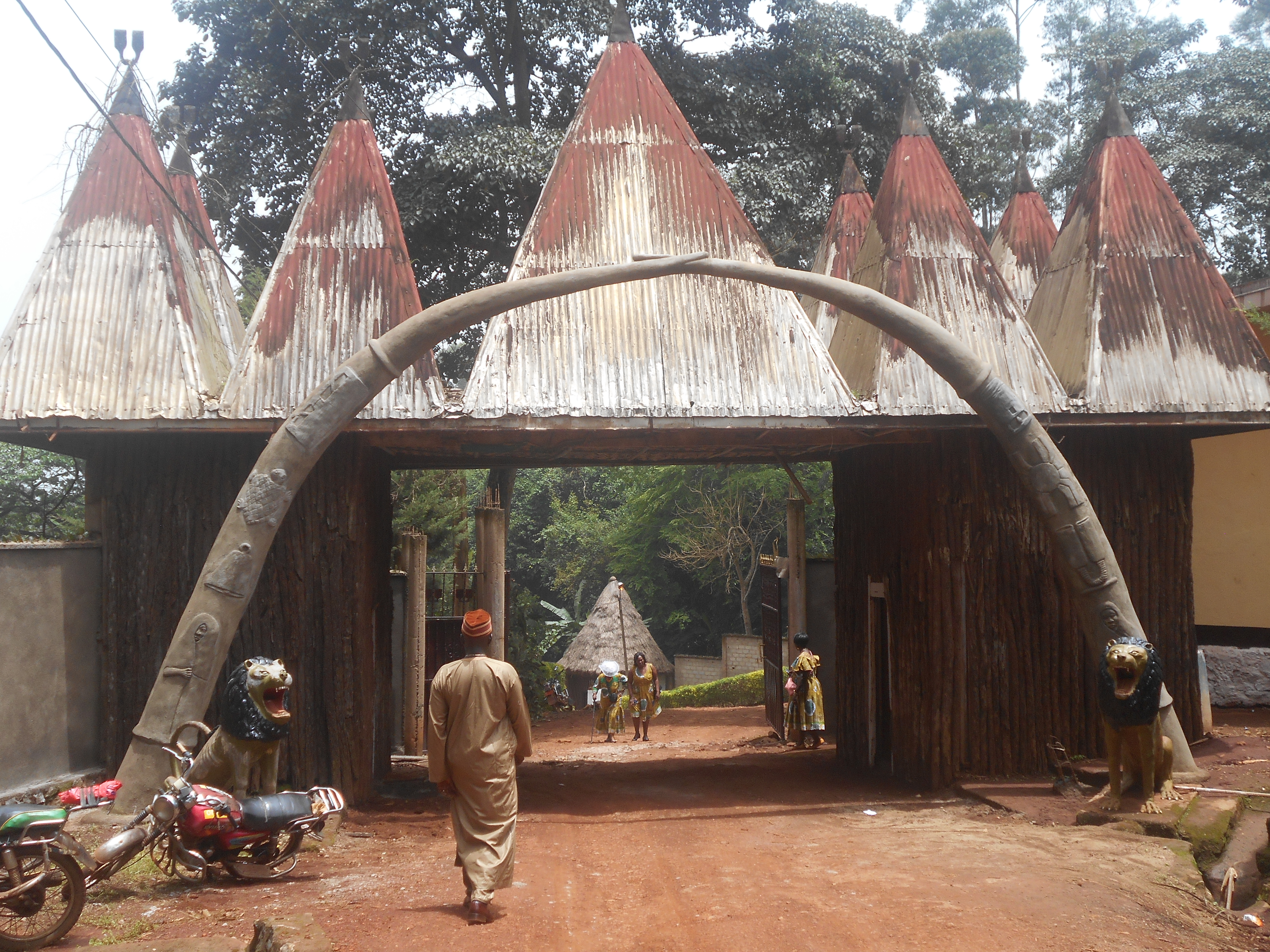
Chiefdom entrance in West Cameroon

The city had an urban population of 347,517 inhabitants (at the 2008 Census). Bafoussam is the West Region centre of trade, and people are farming coffee, potatoes, maize and beans. The city has also a coffee processing facility and brewery. It is the main city of the Bamiléké people and is home to the Bafoussam chief's palace. Bafoussam is a group composed of 07 villages (Bamendzi, Banengo, Ndiangdam, Ndiangsouoh, Ndiangbou, Toukouop, Ngoueng, and Banengo city B) with 46 districts or sub-villages. The main neighborhoods of the city are Banengo, Djeleng, Famla (also called Akwa), Kamkop, Quartier Eveché, Quartier Haussa and Tamdja.

Bafoussam has two main markets (Marché A and Marché B), several internet cafés, restaurants and supermarkets, and a movie theater. Most of Bafoussam nightlife centers on the area called Akwa (so-named in honor of the neighborhood in Douala). Akwa features several bars, stores, and a live music venue, along with customary vendors of Soya (barbecue beef meat brochettes), Poisson braisé (barbecue fish) and other foods.

This is the birthplace of the football player Geremi and his 17 brothers and sisters, as well as the birthplace of his cousins Pierre Webó and Guy Kouemou.

== History ==
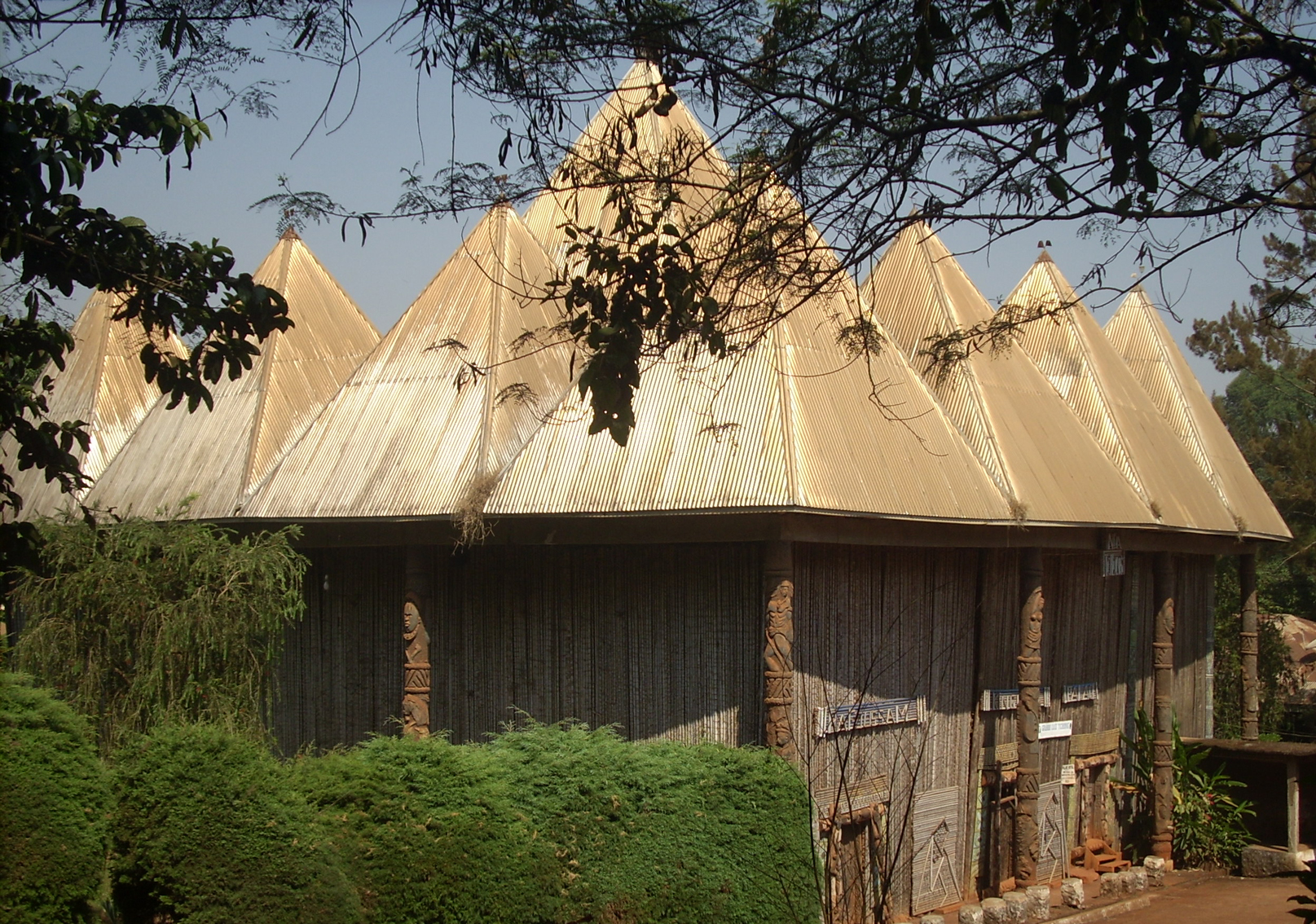
Chiefdom - Bafoussam - Hut for palavers

The Bafoussam people originate from the Bamileke ethnic group, which are the natives of the same region. Claims are made that the Bamileke were descendants of the Baladis who left Egypt in the ninth century of our era. They arrived in the Tikar region around the middle of the twelfth century before dividing around 1360 when their last king, King Ndeh, died. Yende, the first prince, refused the throne and crossed the Nun (Noun river) to found the Bafoussam kingdom. His sister turned to the Banso area (there are about thirty Bamileke villages in the English-speaking North West). Two decades later, Ncharé, the youngest, went down to the plain of Noun to found the Bamoun kingdom. From Bafoussam were born almost all the other Bamileke Kingdoms, between the fifteenth century and the twentieth century (Bansoa was born in 1910 following the forced exile of Fo Taghe of Bafoussam)

=== Name ===
Originally, Bafoussam is written in Bafoussam dialect "Pe Foussan" or "Pe Fussep" which literally means "people of ......". Over time, "Pe" has become "Ba" while retaining the same meaning.

When Westerners arrived, they united the two sound elements "Pe" and "Foussan" to make Bafoussam.

Another source, however, argues that Bafoussam is Fuh Sep's "bad western translation", meaning "we earn more by selling in detail than wholesale". According to this version, the Bafoussam would be a people who bought wholesale to resell in detail or who sold in detail by measuring in small baskets. Fuh here means to measure and Sap or Sep which means profit or treasure, to symbolize by the small basket in which one sold in detail. Pefuhssap or Pefuhssep means "those who have discovered that profit (treasure) is in retail".

It is nevertheless noted that the two sources of information on the origin of the name Bafoussam are not contradictory and it is safe to say that the Bafoussam left their place of residence from the Tikar plain with their name since they already practiced retail trade with small baskets.

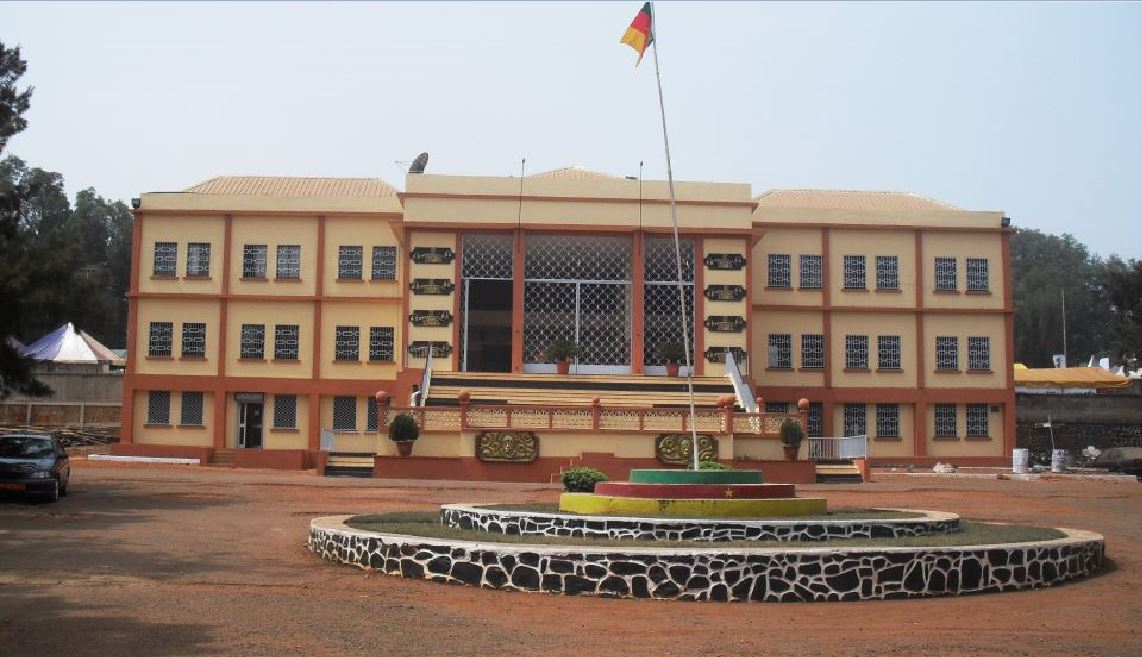
City hall of (Communauté Urbaine de) Bafoussam

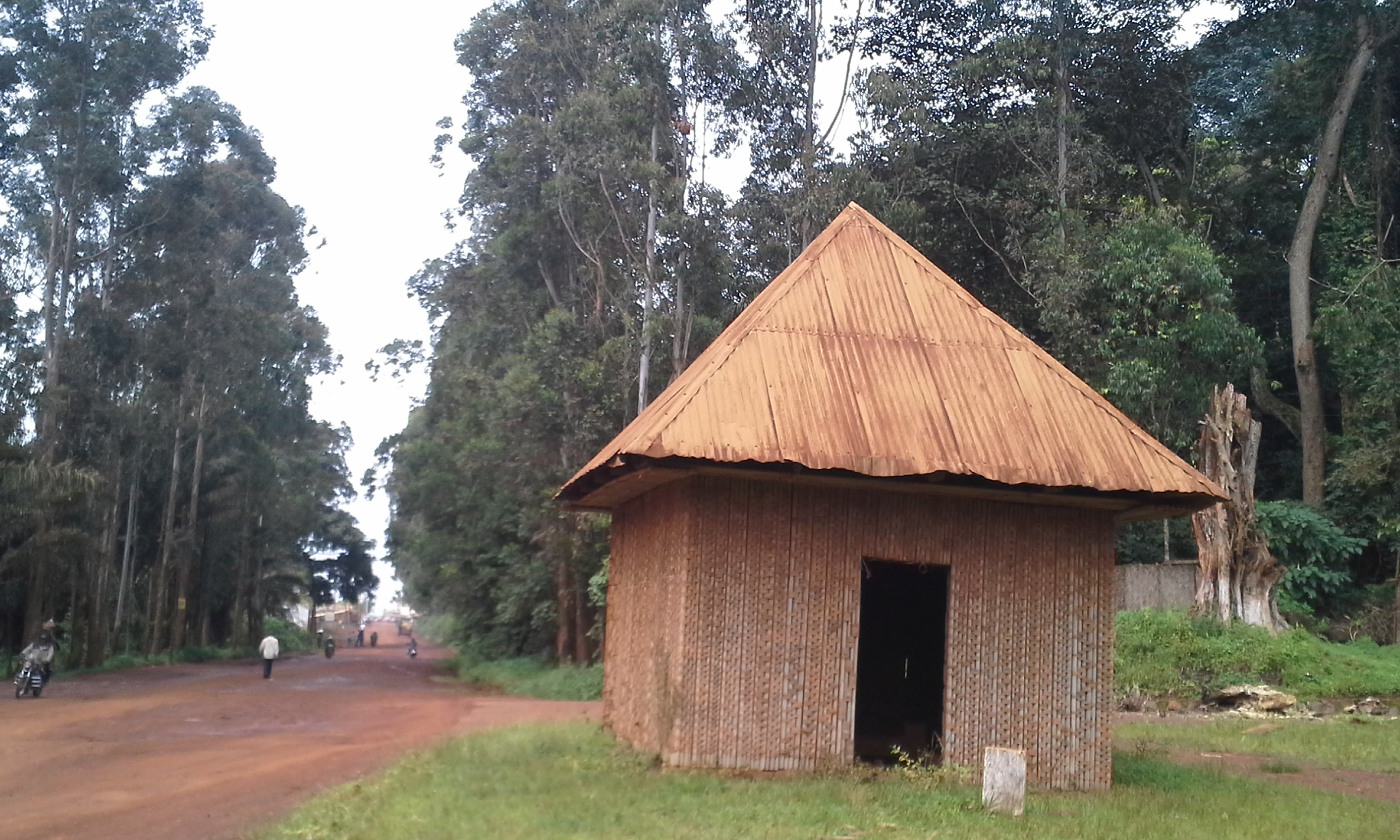
Sacred chieftaincy bafoussam

=== Birth of Bafoussam city ===
In 1945, an unexpected meeting between the colonial administrator of the Bamileke region (during the colonial times, the present day West region was called the Bamileke region) and the monarch of Fu'sap (Bafoussam), Tchoumtchoua Paul, who ruled from 1933 to 1958, laid the foundation for increasing the importance of Bafoussam, which lied at the crossroads between British Southern Cameroons and French Cameroon.

By 1950, when Bafoussam became a subdivision of the French colonial administration headed by Jacques Lestrigang, very quickly, the village became cosmopolitan because located at the intercession of the tracks connecting the two Cameroon and also the cities charged with history that are Dschang, Foumban and Ngaoundéré. Thus the first servicing plan was designed by the French architect Dufayard. Its execution, associated with the dynamism of the populations which occupied it, had to trigger the skyrocketing of the city. Then came his twinning with the city of Bayeux, a city located in Calvados, France.

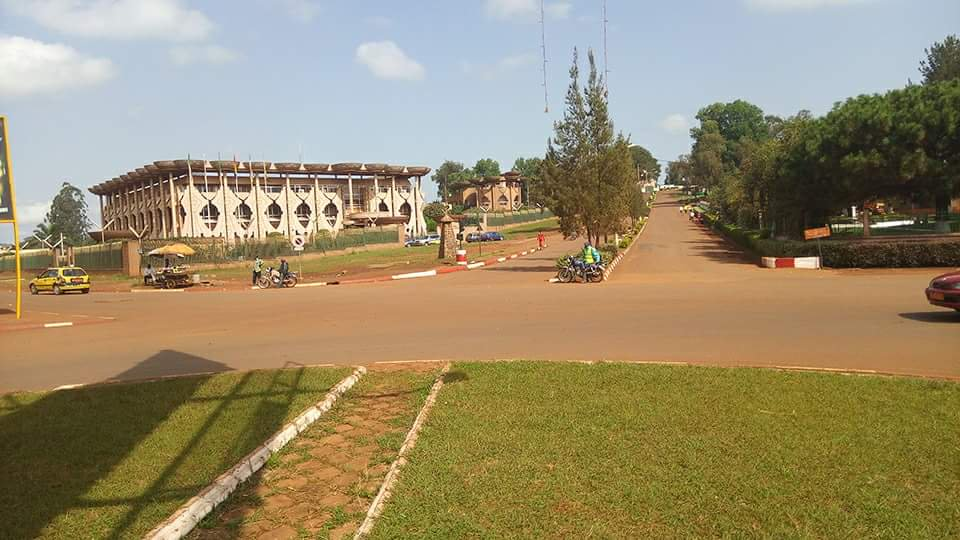
BEAC (Bafoussam branch) from across the road

As the saying goes "for souls nobly born, valor doesn't await the passing of years", Bafoussam replaced Dschang a few years later as the capital of the West Region (then West Province) and equally replaced Nkongsamba as the economic hub of the region. Thus, important economic operators including the BEAC (Banque des Etats d'Afrique Centrale), Brasseries of Cameroon, and other industrial units in the making orchestrated a rush to the new city.

On July 10, 1959, five rebel leaders were shot in the market square.

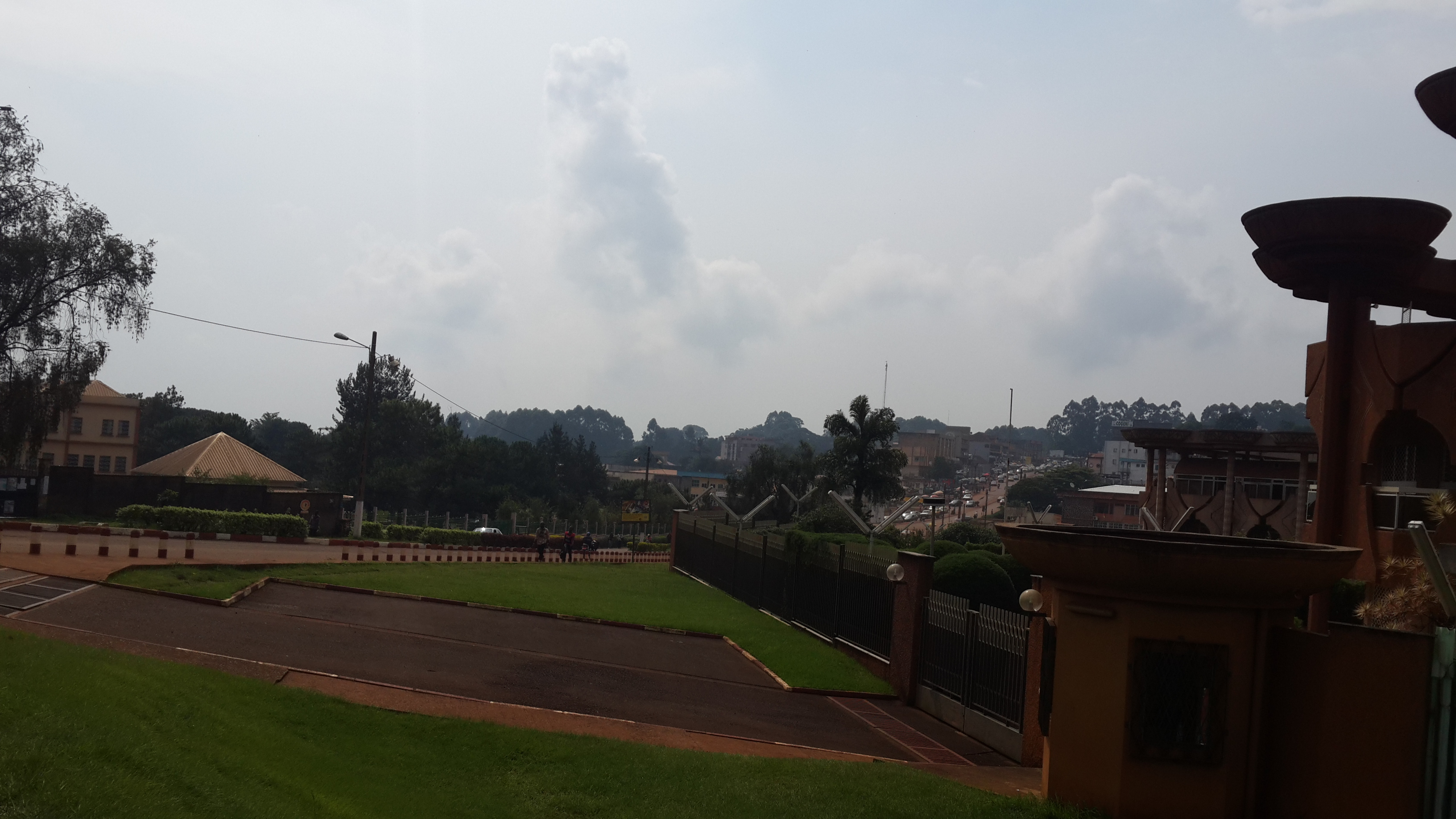
View near BEAC (Bafoussam branch), Bafoussam

== Geography ==
=== Topography ===
Bafoussam is built in the foothills of the Banengo and Baleng hills that are covered with savannah vegetation. The city, located at about 1500 meters above sea level is built on stairs on the perimeters of Tamdja neighborhoods (1st floor), shopping center and Djemoum (2nd floor), Djeleng (3rd floor) and lower corners called Mairie rurale and Tougang (4th level).

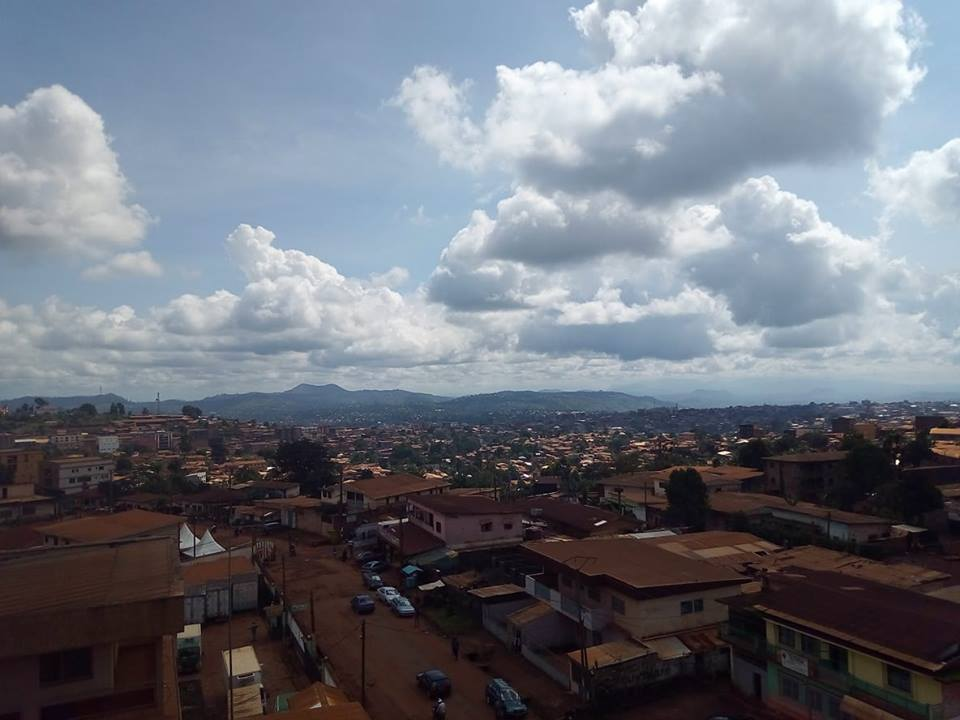
A view of the Famla neighbourhood (commonly called Akwa) in Bafoussam

=== Climate ===
The climate is constantly cool with a temperature oscillating between 15 °C and 27 °C. With climate change in recent years, Bafoussam sometimes reaches 28 °C during the dry season that extends from mid-November to mid-March (four months). The rainy season lasts eight months, from mid-March to mid-November.

Köppen-Geiger climate classification system classifies its climate as tropical savanna climate (Aw). However, its temperatures are lower than other locations with this classification due to its high elevation.

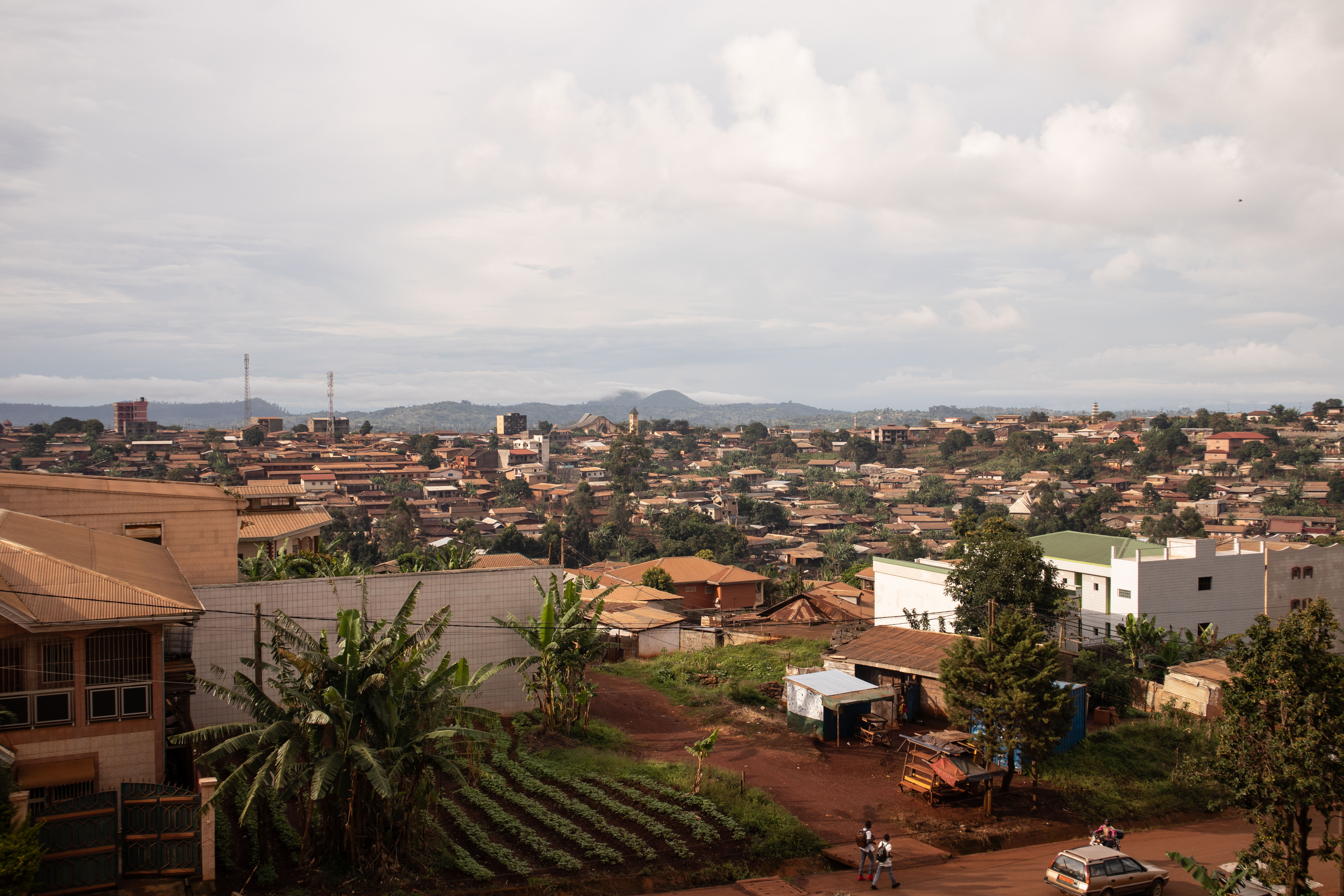
View from Baptist Health Center

Climate data for Bafoussam, Cameroon (1944-1956)
Month	Jan	Feb	Mar	Apr	May	Jun	Jul	Aug	Sep	Oct	Nov	Dec	Year
Record high °C (°F)	30.4 (86.7)	31.1 (88.0)	31.8 (89.2)	30.7 (87.3)	28.9 (84.0)	29.5 (85.1)	26.4 (79.5)	28.7 (83.7)	26.3 (79.3)	27.0 (80.6)	28.3 (82.9)	29.3 (84.7)	31.8 (89.2)
Mean daily maximum °C (°F)	27.0 (80.6)	27.4 (81.3)	27.3 (81.1)	26.2 (79.2)	25.1 (77.2)	24.2 (75.6)	23.3 (73.9)	23.3 (73.9)	23.4 (74.1)	23.6 (74.5)	24.9 (76.8)	25.8 (78.4)	25.1 (77.2)
Daily mean °C (°F)	20.9 (69.6)	21.3 (70.3)	21.5 (70.7)	21.0 (69.8)	20.2 (68.4)	19.5 (67.1)	19.1 (66.4)	19.2 (66.6)	19.2 (66.6)	19.3 (66.7)	20.0 (68.0)	20.2 (68.4)	20.1 (68.2)
Mean daily minimum °C (°F)	14.8 (58.6)	15.2 (59.4)	15.7 (60.3)	15.8 (60.4)	15.4 (59.7)	14.8 (58.6)	14.9 (58.8)	15.2 (59.4)	15.0 (59.0)	15.0 (59.0)	15.1 (59.2)	14.6 (58.3)	15.1 (59.2)
Record low °C (°F)	12.0 (53.6)	12.0 (53.6)	10.2 (50.4)	10.0 (50.0)	10.0 (50.0)	10.0 (50.0)	10.5 (50.9)	12.6 (54.7)	12.9 (55.2)	13.0 (55.4)	12.2 (54.0)	12.0 (53.6)	10.0 (50.0)
Average precipitation mm (inches)	12.3 (0.48)	34.3 (1.35)	97.0 (3.82)	171.8 (6.76)	189.8 (7.47)	192.3 (7.57)	228.5 (9.00)	220.9 (8.70)	299.7 (11.80)	295.1 (11.62)	64.3 (2.53)	10.6 (0.42)	1,816.6 (71.52)
Average rainy days (≥ 0.1 mm)	2	4	9	16	18	20	22	22	25	25	8	1	172
Average relative humidity (%)	62	61	64	73	78	81	82	81	85	80	71	64	74
Source: NOAA (precipitation 1934-1954)

=== Waterfalls ===
The city is not very rich in natural rivers. The Mifi River runs along the southern part of the city to fall in the void creating the fall of the Metche. Other small streams including Megang, Nlom, and Vava exist in the city. Next to the fall of the Metche, which is a real attraction, Lake Baleng (this crater lake) is also a tourist attraction.

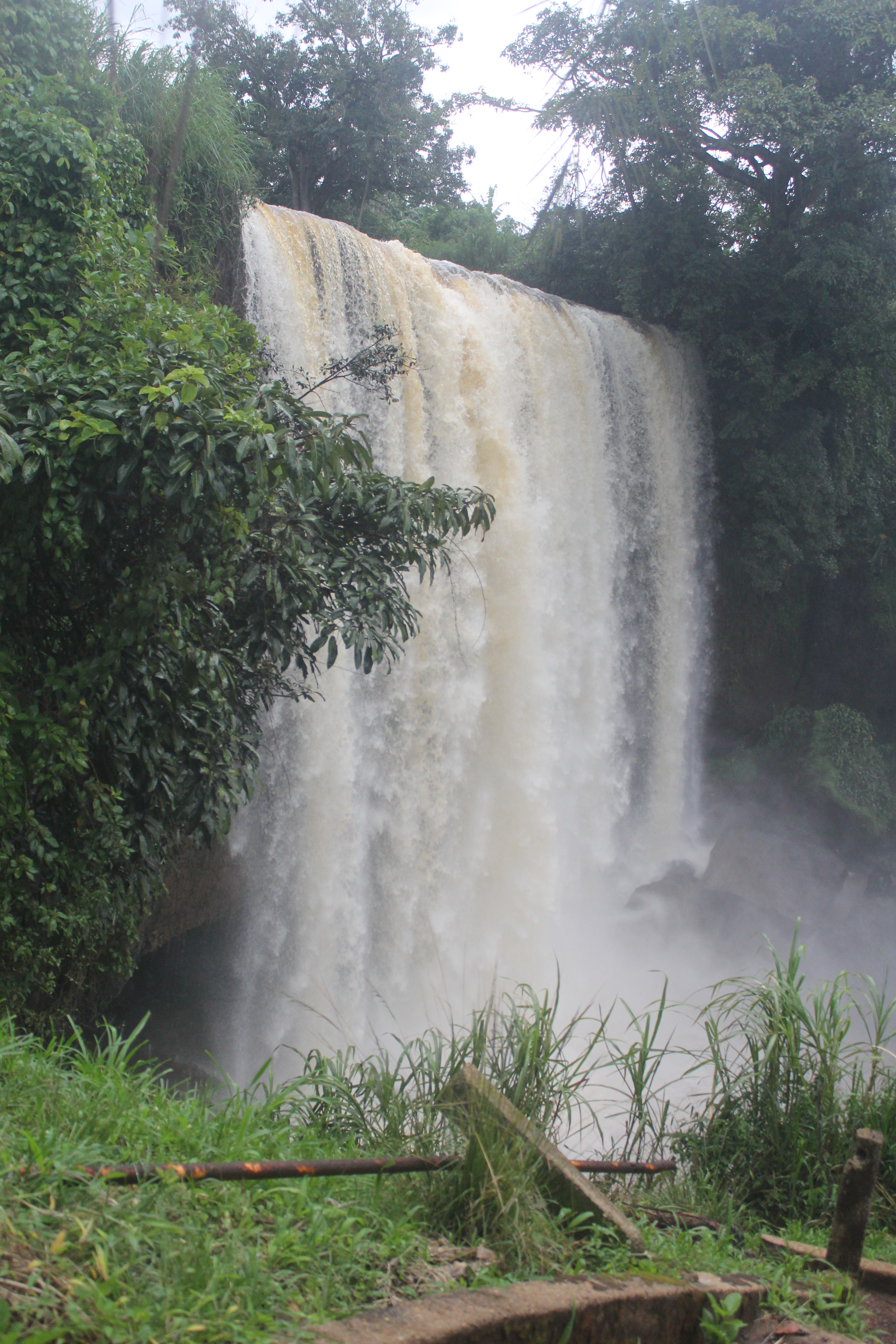
Métché Waterfalls

== Education ==
Bafoussam is home to a high number of high schools (including technical and vocational schools), many primary schools and kindergartens, and few institutions providing tertiary education. Most students upon graduation travel to other cities like Dschang, Yaounde, Douala, or Buea to attend university or other forms of tertiary institutions. In Cameroon, Lycée is the name given to government/public high schools, while Collège is the name given to privately funded high schools.

Cameroon has two official languages so it is common to find schools that offer education solely in English or French or both (so-called bilingual high schools)

=== Notable High Schools ===
The top 10 high schools in Bafoussam according to the ranking of the 2017 session by the Office du Baccalauréat du Cameroun are;

List of Top 10 High Schools in Bafoussam in 2017
School	National rank	Rank in West Region
Collège Polyvalent de l'Assomption	6	1
Lycée Bilingue de Bafoussam (Government Bilingual High School Bafoussam)	22	3
Lycée de Bafoussam Rural	47	7
Lycée Bilingue de Gouache (Government Bilingual High School Gouache)	50	10
Lycée Bilingue de Baleng (Government Bilingual High School Baleng)	53	11
Lycée Technique de Banengo Bafoussam	54	12
Lycée Technique de Bafoussam (LTIC Bafoussam)	58	14
CETIC Sacré-Coeur de Bafoussam	78	18
Collège Saint Thomas d'Aquin	91	20
Lycée Classique de Bafoussam (Government Classical High School Bafoussam)	92	21

Lycée Bilingue de Bafoussam (Bafoussam Government Bilingual High School) is the best government/publicly funded high school in Bafoussam and the whole of the West Region of Cameroon. With time, it has imposed itself as a place of quality education and high discipline. Every year, a handful of students enter the prestigious National Advanced School of Engineering (École nationale supérieure polytechnique de Yaoundé) and other prestigious tertiary institutions in Cameroon.

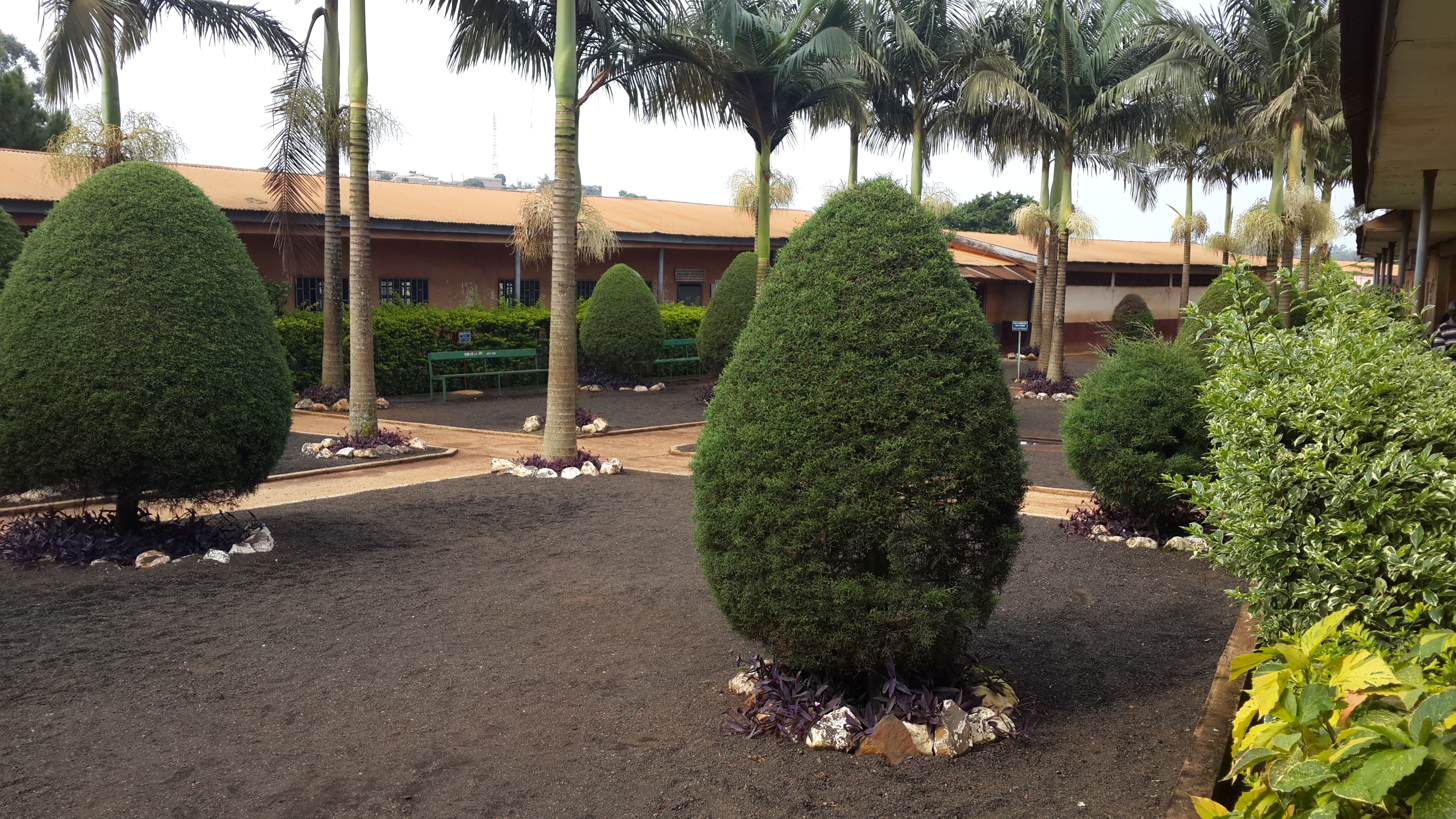
Partial view of Government Bilingual High School

Other famous High Schools include:

- Complexe Polytechnique Bilingue privé laïc TAMA (CoPoBiT)
- College Martin Luther King (Martin Luther King College)

=== Tertiary Education ===
Most of these institutions are affiliated to state universities like the University of Dschang or the University of Bamenda. Some of which include;

- Institut Supérieur de Bafoussam ISB
- Institut Catholique de Bafoussam
- Université du Plateau ISAMET Bafoussam
- Université Royale de Bafoussam

== Demographics ==
Since the early 2000s, the population of Bafoussam has been rapidly increasing. According to AFRICApolis project, led by e-GEOPOLIS, Bafoussam is the main centre of a Continuous Built-up Area which became a millionaire city in 2015 with a population of about 1,146,230 inhabitants. This makes Bafoussam as the third largest city in Cameroon after Yaounde and Douala.

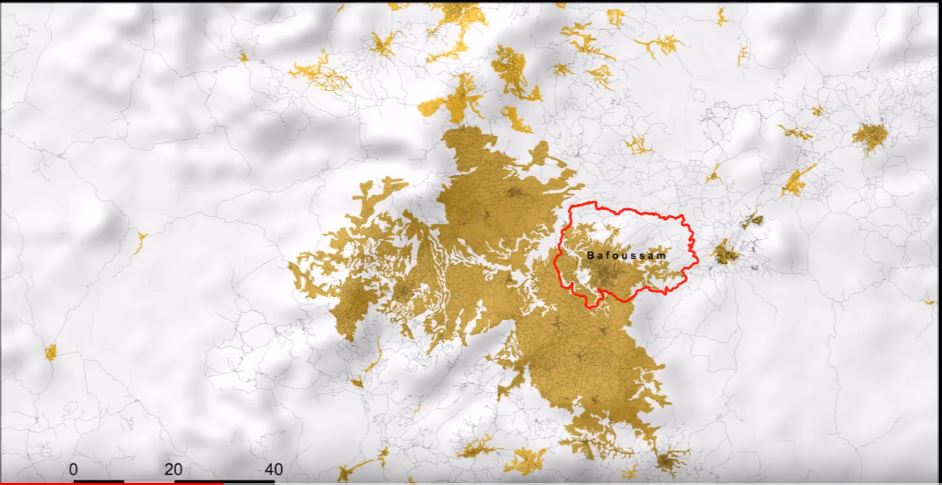
Bafoussam continuous built-up area map as defined by AFRICApolis

=== Rites & celebrations ===
- Nyang Nyang Festival
Nyang Nyang Festival 2018.

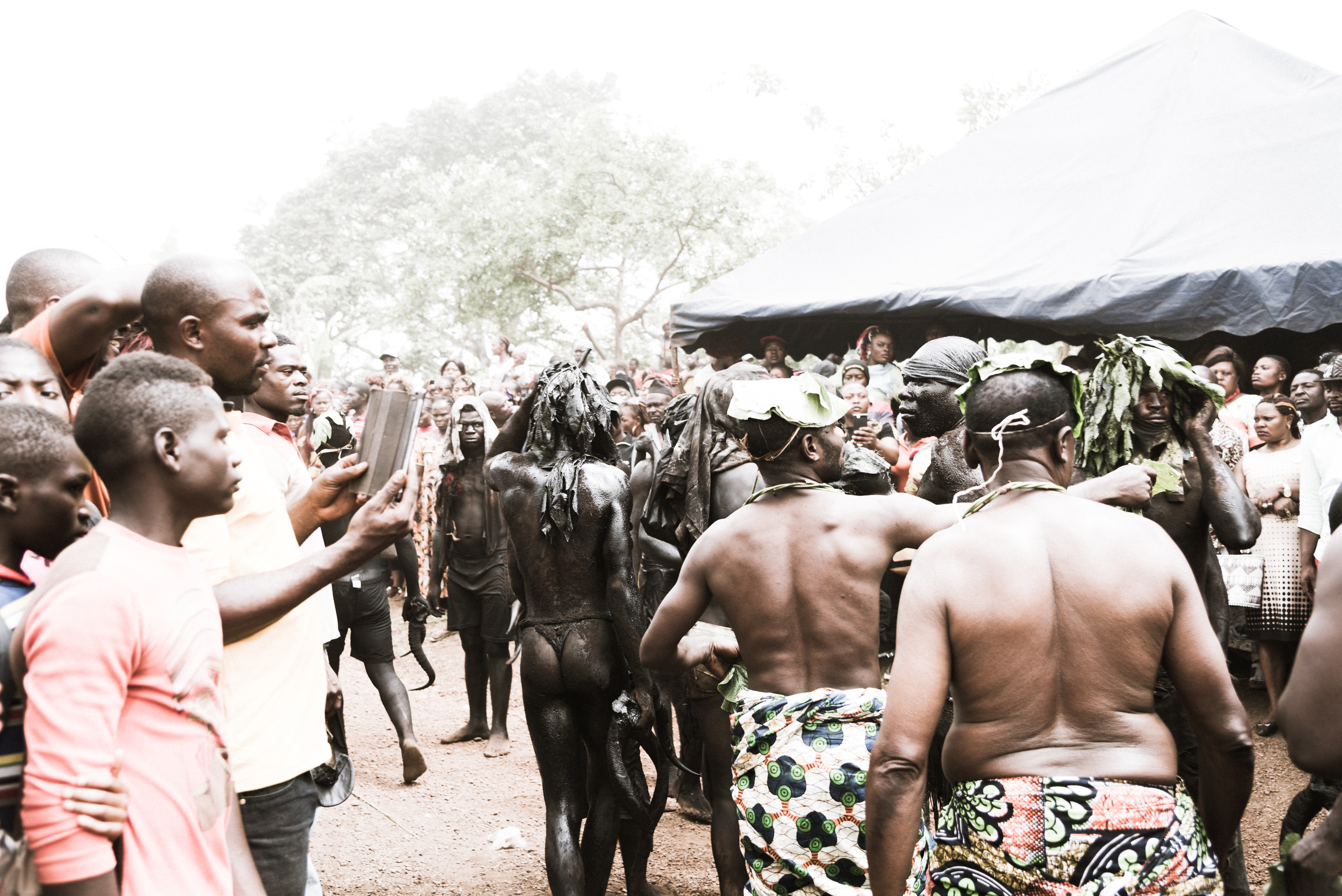

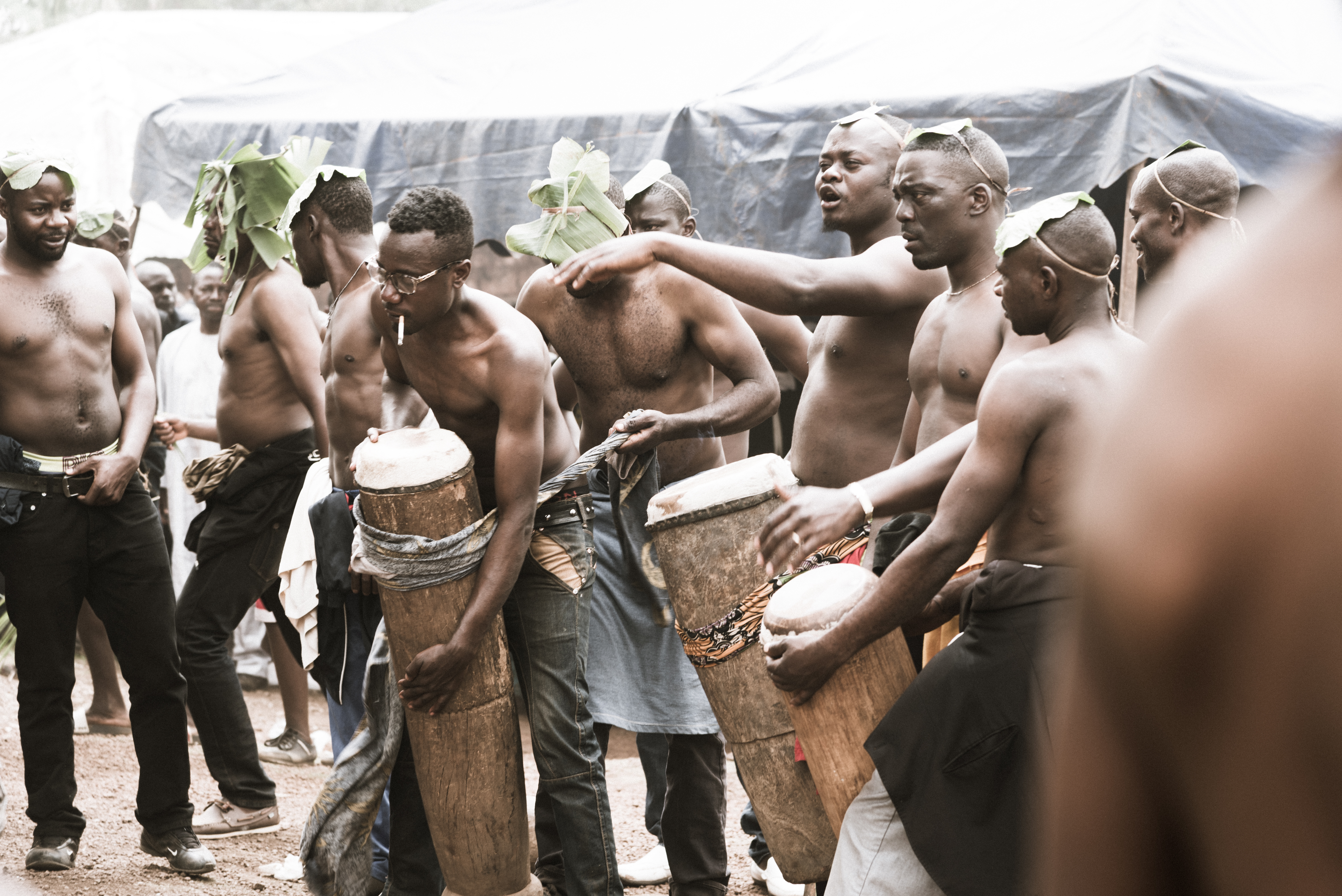

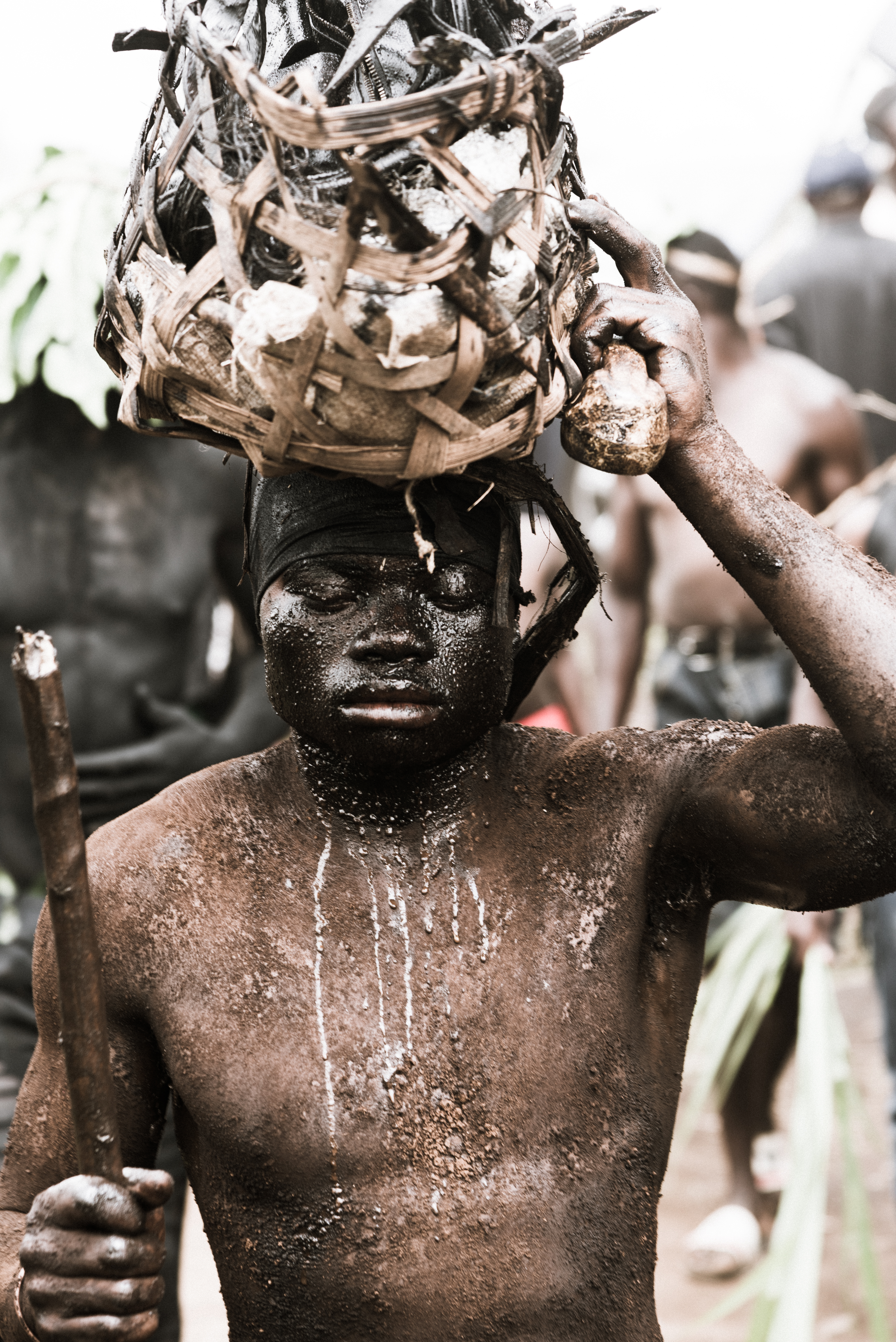

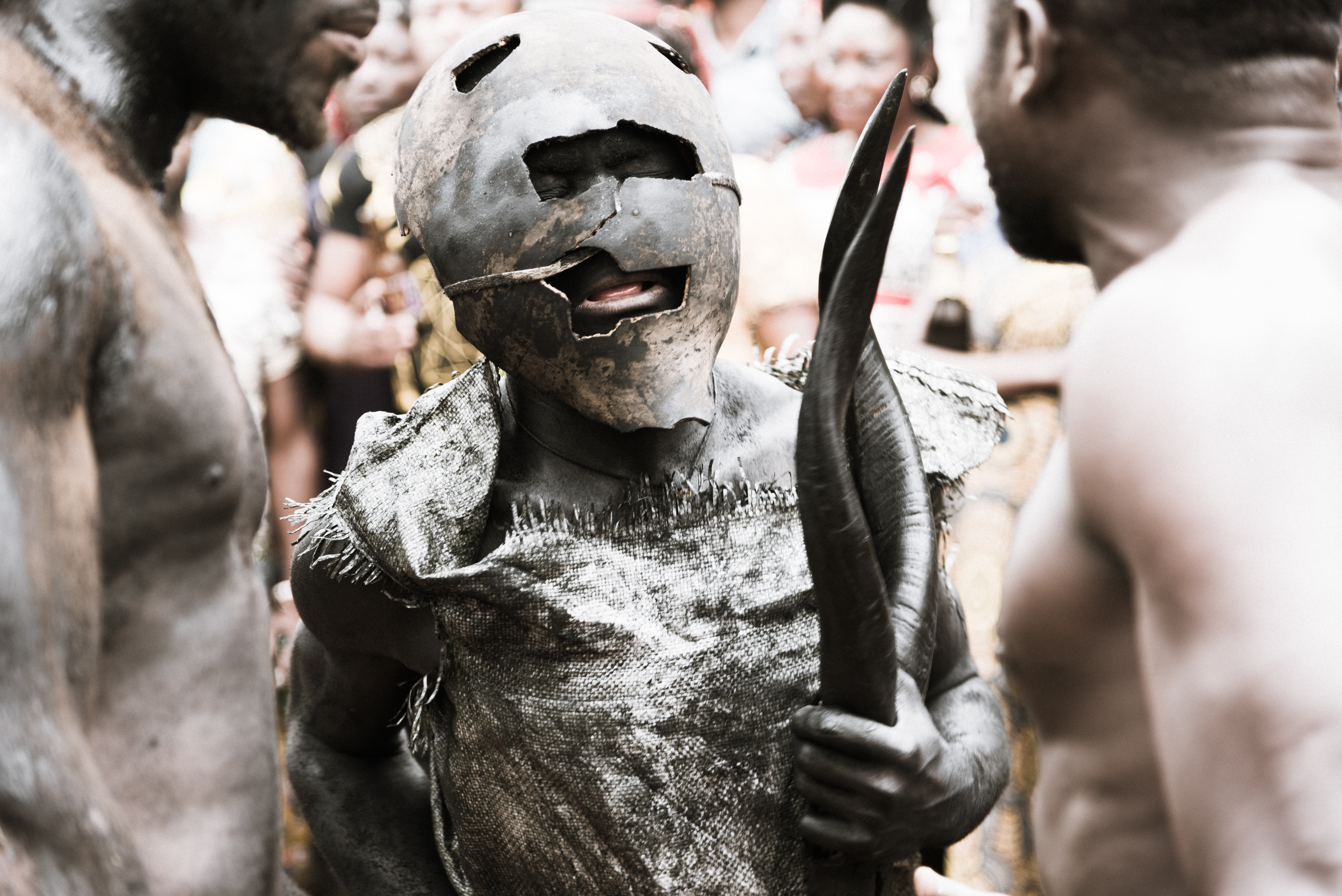

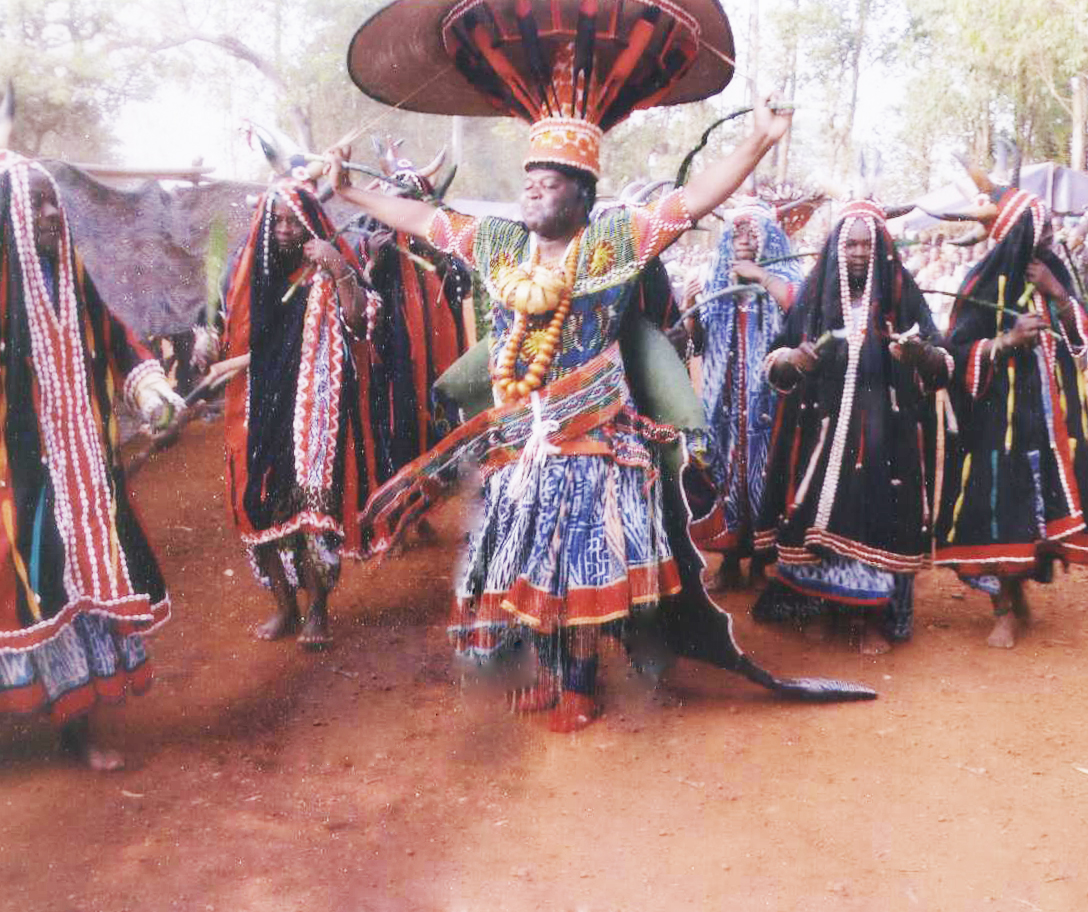

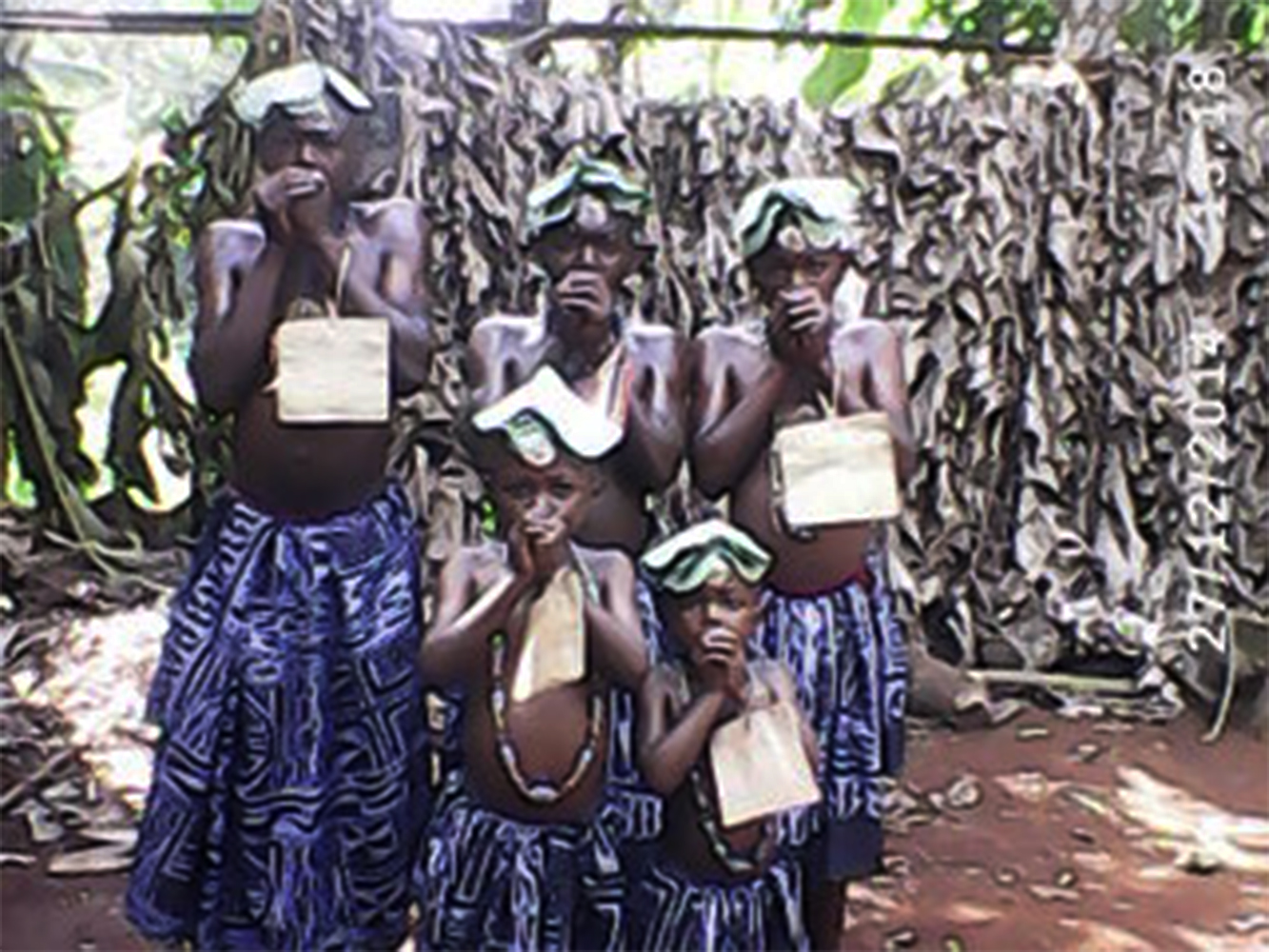

== Twin towns - Sister cities ==
Bafoussam is twinned with:

- Bayeux

== Notable people ==
- Pierre Webó (Former Footballer)
- Njitap Geremi (Former Footballer)
- Guy Kouemou (Inventor, Scientist)
- Arsene Tema Biwole (Engineer, Physicist)
