= Fusion Engineering and Design =

- Discipline: Fusion power, plasma science
- Language: English
- Edited by: Seungyon Cho, Rudolf Neu

Publication details
- Former names: Nuclear Engineering and Design/Fusion (1984-1987)
- History: 1984–present
- Publisher: Elsevier
- Frequency: Monthly
- Impact factor: 2 (2024)

Standard abbreviations
- ISO 4: Fusion Eng. Des.

Indexing
- CODEN: FEDEEE
- ISSN: 0920-3796 (print); 1873-7196 (web)
- LCCN: sn87012974
- OCLC no.: 874318875

Links
- Journal homepage; Online access; Online archive

Fusion Engineering and Design is a peer-reviewed scientific journal, published monthly by Elsevier. Established under the name Nuclear Engineering and Design/Fusion in 1984 and retitled to its current name in 1987, it covers research on fusion power and plasma science. Its editors-in-chief are Seungyon Cho (Korea Institute of Fusion Energy) and Rudolf Neu (Max Planck Institute for Plasma Physics).

== Abstracting and indexing ==
The journal is abstracted and indexed in:

- Current Contents/Engineering, Computing & Technology
- EBSCO databases
- Ei Compendex
- Inspec
- Science Citation Index Expanded
- Scopus

According to the Journal Citation Reports, the journal has a 2024 impact factor of 2.
