= Versatile Toroidal Facility =

The Versatile Toroidal Facility (VTF) is a research group within the Physics Research Division of the MIT Plasma Science and Fusion Center at the Massachusetts Institute of Technology. The VTF is a laboratory focused on studying the phenomenon of magnetic reconnection. For this purpose the group has a small tokamak designed to observe rarefied plasmas with probes. These probes measure electric and magnetic field behavior as well as various plasma characteristics in order to better understand the poorly understood processes involved in magnetic reconnection.

The VTF is a fundamental physics research group, and its research has wide-ranging and immediate impact on our understanding of such plasma-related subjects as solar flares, the aurora borealis, magnetic confinement fusion, and magnetohydrodynamic theory in general. The VTF was built and originally led by Dr. Marcel Gaudreau, and prior to its retirement, was led by Dr. Miklos Porkolab and Dr. Jan Egedal, all MIT faculty at the time.
