= List of presidents of Cameroon =

This is a list of presidents of Cameroon since the country gained independence from France in 1960 to the present day.

A total of two people have served as President of Cameroon.

The current President of Cameroon is Paul Biya, since 6 November 1982.

== List of officeholders ==
Political parties

Cameroonian Union (UC)
Cameroonian National Union (UNC)
Cameroon People's Democratic Movement (RDPC)

No.	Portrait	Name (Birth–Death)	Elected	Term of office			Political party	Prime minister
No.	Portrait	Name (Birth–Death)	Elected	Took office	Left office	Time in office	Political party	Prime minister
Republic of Cameroon (1960–1961)
1		Ahmadou Ahidjo (1924–1989)	—	5 May 1960	1 October 1961	1 year, 149 days	UC	Assalé
Federal Republic of Cameroon (1961–1972)
(1)		Ahmadou Ahidjo (1924–1989)	—	1 October 1961	2 June 1972	10 years, 245 days	UC (until 1966)	East Cameroon
(1)		Ahmadou Ahidjo (1924–1989)	1965	1 October 1961	2 June 1972	10 years, 245 days	UC (until 1966)	Assalé; Ahanda; Tchoungui
(1)		Ahmadou Ahidjo (1924–1989)	1965	1 October 1961	2 June 1972	10 years, 245 days	UNC	West Cameroon
(1)		Ahmadou Ahidjo (1924–1989)	1970	1 October 1961	2 June 1972	10 years, 245 days	UNC	Foncha; Jua; Muna
United Republic of Cameroon (1972–1984)
(1)		Ahmadou Ahidjo (1924–1989)	—	2 June 1972	6 November 1982 (Resigned)	10 years, 157 days	UNC	Biya
(1)		Ahmadou Ahidjo (1924–1989)	1975	2 June 1972	6 November 1982 (Resigned)	10 years, 157 days	UNC	Biya
(1)		Ahmadou Ahidjo (1924–1989)	1980	2 June 1972	6 November 1982 (Resigned)	10 years, 157 days	UNC	Biya
2		Paul Biya (born 1933)	—	6 November 1982	4 February 1984	1 year, 90 days	UNC	Maigari; Ayang
Republic of Cameroon (1984–present)
(2)		Paul Biya (born 1933)	1984	4 February 1984	Incumbent	42 years, 193 days	UNC (Note: Until 1985; renamed to RDPC)	Hayatou; Achu; Musonge; Inoni; Yang; Ngute
(2)		Paul Biya (born 1933)	1984	4 February 1984	Incumbent	42 years, 193 days	RDPC	Hayatou; Achu; Musonge; Inoni; Yang; Ngute
(2)		Paul Biya (born 1933)	1988	4 February 1984	Incumbent	42 years, 193 days	RDPC	Hayatou; Achu; Musonge; Inoni; Yang; Ngute
(2)		Paul Biya (born 1933)	1992	4 February 1984	Incumbent	42 years, 193 days	RDPC	Hayatou; Achu; Musonge; Inoni; Yang; Ngute
(2)		Paul Biya (born 1933)	1997	4 February 1984	Incumbent	42 years, 193 days	RDPC	Hayatou; Achu; Musonge; Inoni; Yang; Ngute
(2)		Paul Biya (born 1933)	2004	4 February 1984	Incumbent	42 years, 193 days	RDPC	Hayatou; Achu; Musonge; Inoni; Yang; Ngute
(2)		Paul Biya (born 1933)	2011	4 February 1984	Incumbent	42 years, 193 days	RDPC	Hayatou; Achu; Musonge; Inoni; Yang; Ngute
(2)		Paul Biya (born 1933)	2018	4 February 1984	Incumbent	42 years, 193 days	RDPC	Hayatou; Achu; Musonge; Inoni; Yang; Ngute
(2)		Paul Biya (born 1933)	2025	4 February 1984	Incumbent	42 years, 193 days	RDPC	Hayatou; Achu; Musonge; Inoni; Yang; Ngute

== See also ==
- Politics of Cameroon
- President of Cameroon
- Prime Minister of Cameroon
  - List of prime ministers of Cameroon
- List of colonial governors of Cameroon
- List of heads of government of French Cameroon
- List of heads of government of British Cameroons
