= List of prime ministers of Cameroon =

This is a list of prime ministers of Cameroon since the country gained independence from France in 1960 to the present day.

The current Prime Minister of Cameroon is Joseph Ngute, since 4 January 2019.

== List of officeholders ==
Political parties

Cameroonian Union (UC)
Cameroonian National Union (UNC)
Kamerun National Democratic Party (KNDP)
Cameroon People's Democratic Movement (RDPC)

No.	Portrait	Name (Birth–Death)	Election	Term of office			Political party	President
No.	Portrait	Name (Birth–Death)	Election	Took office	Left office	Time in office	Political party	President
Republic of Cameroon (1960–1961)
1		Ahmadou Ahidjo (1924–1989)	—	1 January 1960	15 May 1960	135 days	UC	None Himself
2		Charles Assalé (1911–1999)	—	15 May 1960	1 October 1961	1 year, 139 days	UC	Ahidjo
Federal Republic of Cameroon (1961–1972)
East Cameroon
1		Charles Assalé (1911–1999)	1964	1 October 1961	19 June 1965	3 years, 261 days	UC	Ahidjo
2		Vincent de Paul Ahanda (1918–1975)	—	19 June 1965	20 November 1965	154 days	UC	Ahidjo
3		Simon Pierre Tchoungui (1916–1997)	—	20 November 1965	2 June 1972	6 years, 195 days	UC (until 1966)	Ahidjo
(3)		Simon Pierre Tchoungui (1916–1997)	—	20 November 1965	2 June 1972	6 years, 195 days	UNC	Ahidjo
West Cameroon
1		John Ngu Foncha (1916–1999)	1964	1 October 1961	13 May 1965	3 years, 224 days	KNDP	Ahidjo
2		Augustine Ngom Jua (1929–1977)	—	13 May 1965	11 January 1968	2 years, 243 days	KNDP (until 1966)	Ahidjo
(2)		Augustine Ngom Jua (1929–1977)	—	13 May 1965	11 January 1968	2 years, 243 days	UNC	Ahidjo
3		Salomon Tandeng Muna (1912–2002)	1970	11 January 1968	2 June 1972	4 years, 143 days	UNC	Ahidjo
United Republic of Cameroon (1972–1984)
Post abolished (2 June 1972 – 30 June 1975)
3		Paul Biya (born 1933)	1978	30 June 1975	6 November 1982 (Became president)	7 years, 129 days	UNC	Ahidjo
4		Bello Bouba Maigari (born 1947)	1983	6 November 1982	22 August 1983	289 days	UNC	Biya
5		Luc Ayang (1947–2025)	—	22 August 1983	25 January 1984	156 days	UNC	Biya
Republic of Cameroon (1984–present)
Post abolished (25 January 1984 – 26 April 1991)
6		Sadou Hayatou (1942–2019)	1992	26 April 1991	9 April 1992	349 days	RDPC	Biya
7		Simon Achidi Achu (1934–2021)	—	9 April 1992	19 September 1996	4 years, 163 days	RDPC	Biya
8		Peter Mafany Musonge (born 1942)	1997; 2002	19 September 1996	8 December 2004	8 years, 80 days	RDPC	Biya
9		Ephraïm Inoni (born 1947)	2007	8 December 2004	30 June 2009	4 years, 204 days	RDPC	Biya
10		Philémon Yang (born 1947)	2013	30 June 2009	4 January 2019	9 years, 188 days	RDPC	Biya
11		Joseph Ngute (born 1954)	2020	4 January 2019	Incumbent	7 years, 222 days	RDPC	Biya

== See also ==
- Politics of Cameroon
- President of Cameroon
  - List of presidents of Cameroon
- Prime Minister of Cameroon
- List of colonial governors of Cameroon
- List of heads of government of French Cameroon
- List of heads of government of British Cameroons
