= 1956 French legislative election in Cameroon =

Elections to the French National Assembly were held in French Cameroons on 2 January 1956.

== Electoral system ==
The four seats allocated to the constituency were elected on two separate electoral rolls; French citizens elected one MP from the first college, whilst non-citizens elected three MPs in the second college.

== Results ==
=== First college ===
Candidate	Party	Votes	%
Maurice Plantier		2,632	50.50
Joseph Gaucher	Democratic and Socialist Union of the Resistance	951	18.25
André Duru	Independent	729	13.99
Armand-Marie Anziani		252	4.83
Henri-Paul-Auguste Journiac	Republican Social	239	4.59
Vincent Paul Casanova		138	2.65
Marie-Albert-Jean Bertrand		116	2.23
Georges Molinatti	Republican Social	77	1.48
Jean Monnier	Independent	38	0.73
One other candidate		40	0.77
Total		5,212	100.00
Valid votes		5,212	96.86
Invalid/blank votes		169	3.14
Total votes		5,381	100.00
Registered voters/turnout		10,804	49.81
Source: Sternberger et al., L'Année politique

=== Second college ===
==== Seat 1 ====
Candidate	Votes	%
Jules Ninine	73,085	44.90
Ahmadou Ahidjo	47,783	29.35
Akana Ibrahima Akono	35,252	21.66
Paul-François Martin	6,657	4.09
Total	162,777	100.00
Valid votes	162,777	97.97
Invalid/blank votes	3,370	2.03
Total votes	166,147	100.00
Registered voters/turnout	315,172	52.72
Source: Sternberger et al.

==== Seat 2 ====
Candidate	Votes	%
Alexandre Douala Manga Bell	41,365	38.85
Ngouankeo Tchoumba	20,979	19.70
Daniel Kemajou	15,103	14.19
Mathias Djoumessi	13,536	12.71
Marcel Bebey Eyidi	7,656	7.19
Robert Tawanba	3,074	2.89
Paul Monthé	2,043	1.92
Three other candidates	2,713	2.55
Total	106,469	100.00
Valid votes	106,469	98.41
Invalid/blank votes	1,724	1.59
Total votes	108,193	100.00
Registered voters/turnout	274,050	39.48
Source: Sternberger et al.

==== Seat 3 ====
Candidate	Votes	%
André-Marie Mbida	66,386	42.00
Charles Assalé	45,984	29.09
Louis-Paul Aujoulat	20,529	12.99
Charles Okala	17,724	11.21
Three other candidates	7,438	4.71
Total	158,061	100.00
Valid votes	158,061	99.27
Invalid/blank votes	1,163	0.73
Total votes	159,224	100.00
Registered voters/turnout	259,203	61.43
Source: Sternberger et al.
