= André-Marie Mbida =

Cameroonian statesman and nationalist

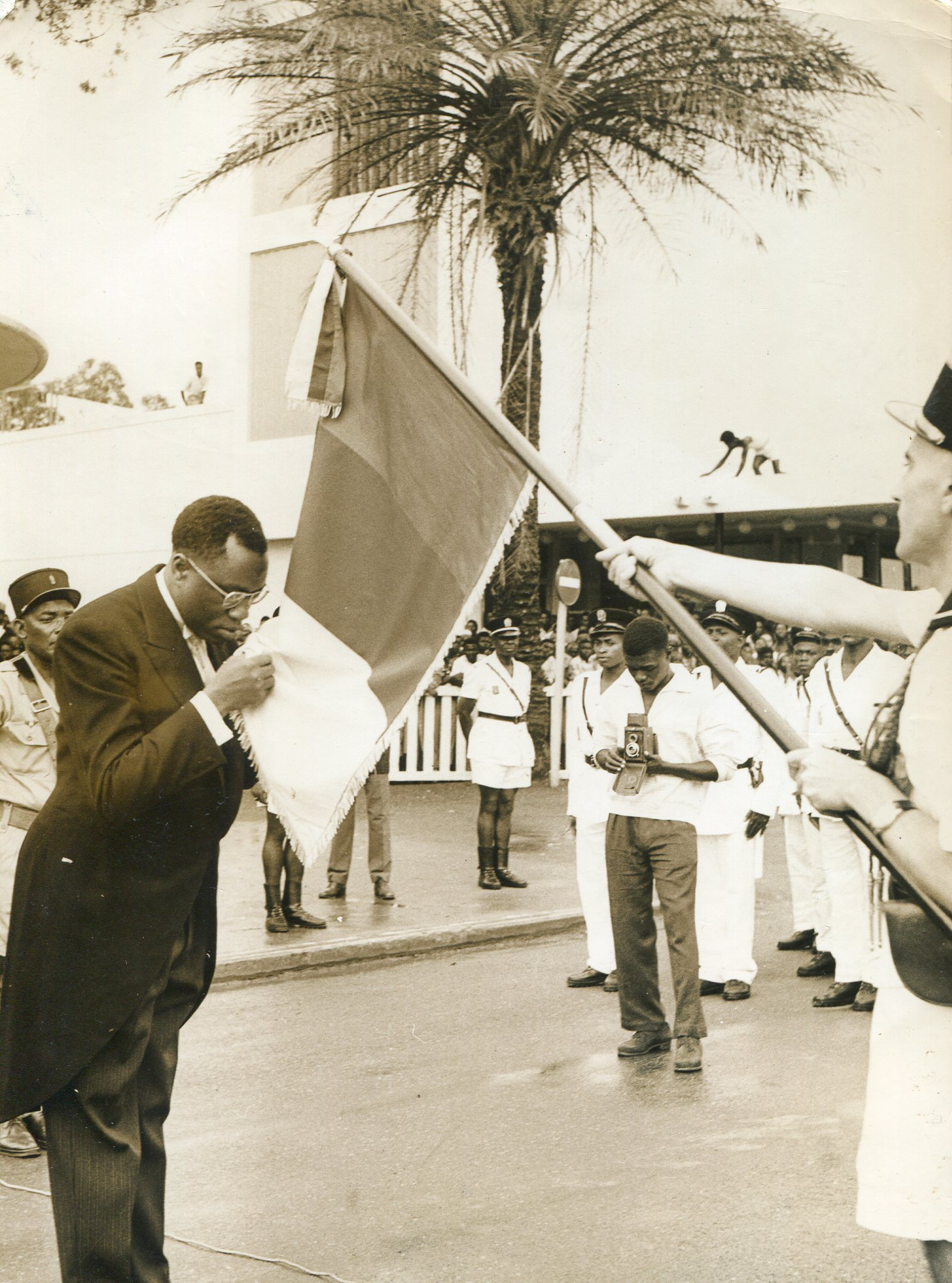
- André-Marie Mbida

President of the Council of Ministers of Cameroon
- In office 12 May 1957 – 18 February 1958
- Preceded by: Office established
- Succeeded by: Ahmadou Ahidjo

Personal details
- Born: André-Marie Mbida; January 1, 1917 Endinding, French Cameroon
- Died: May 2, 1980 (aged 63) Paris, France
- Spouse: Marguerite Mbida
- Children: 6
- Profession: Politician, lawyer
- Known for: First Prime Minister of autonomous French Cameroon; Cameroonian nationalist

Andre-Marie Mbida (25 December 1914 – 2 May 1980) was a Cameroonian statesman, a nationalist, the first Cameroonian to be elected Member of Parliament at the French National Assembly, a Prime Minister of Cameroon, the second African-born Prime Minister in Sub-Saharan Africa, the first Head of State of French-speaking autonomous Cameroon from 12 May 1957 to 16 February 1958, and the first political prisoner of independent Cameroon from 29 June 1962 to 29 June 1965.

== Early life and education ==
Andre-Marie Mbida was born on 25 December 1914 in Edinding (Cameroon) and died 2 May 1980 in Paris (France). He hailed from Nyong and Sanaga region of Cameroon. He was born into the traditional aristocracy as the son of a mixed race Traditional ruler Simon Monbele Ongo Nanga chief of Ngo logou and Edinding who led a rebellion against the German invaders and Ngono Veronique . André Marie MBIDA went to the rural primary school of Efok (Lekié division) and was a brilliant student. He then continued his secondary education at the Minor Seminary Akono from 1929 to 1935, where he became a mathematics and Latin teacher, and later on at the Major Seminary Mvolyé from 1935 to 1943. While studying in the grand Seminaire he became a friend of the future presidents Fulbert Youlou and Barthélémy Boganda. He was for a while tempted by the idea of becoming a priest, but after he left the Seminary, he became Head Teacher of the Balessing rural school in 1943. He was very intelligent so he completed his studies and at least graduated as a lawyer in 1945. After completing his training in Law, he worked at the treasury in Yaoundé for a year in 1945, and then became a business representative in Yaoundé and Ebolowa till 1954. As business representative, his monthly income varies between approximately 500,000 CFA francs and 800,000 CFA francs, or even a million.

== Family life ==
On 14 August 1946, he married Marguerite Embolo, daughter of Assiguena Fabien, an Eton tribal chief and owner of plantations (one of the most prosperous cocoa farmers in the Lekié division) and of Mbono Marie, former midwife at Mvog-Betsi an Ewondo clan in Yaoundé Mbankolo and moreover granddaughter of the powerful ruler, Omgba Bissogo.one of the founders of the actual Capital Yaounde along with his half-brother Essono Ela. They had six children, four sons and two daughters, among them, Louis Tobie Mbida, the present Chairman of the Cameroonian Party of Democrats (CPD) (French: Parti des Démocrates Camerounais (PDC)), Simon Pierre Omgba Mbida, Cameroonian diplomat, Alphonse Massi Mbida, Company Head in Ile de France, Paul Etoga Mbida, a mathematics and physics student who died in France in 1985.

== Political career ==
=== Break with Aujoulat and foundation of COCOCAM ===
He devoted himself to the cause of workers and peasants of Cameroon. In his region of origin, he promoted cultural values in the traditional movement named Anacsama. Known as a devout Catholic, very close ties continue to unite him with the Catholic hierarchy, nevertheless he became closer to the French Socialist Party (SFIO), an active political French party in the UN Trust Territory of the Cameroons under French administration. He is a Cameroonian Democratic Bloc (French: Bloc Démocratique Camerounais, BDC) militant, a party affiliated with the SFIO. In 1952, he was elected to the Territorial Assembly and after that he is appointed Adviser to the French Union on 10 October 1953.

The following year he resigned from the Cameroonian Democratic Bloc then he founded the COCOCAM (Coordinating Committee of Cameroon) (French: Comité de Coordination du Cameroun, COCOCAM). The reasons for his departure are interpreted differently, depending on whether one is in favour of André-Marie Mbida or Louis-Paul Aujoulat. According to Ateba Yene (son), André-Marie Mbida was just the spokesperson of COCOCAM. Its founders would be Manga Mado Ngoa Constantine Ombgwa Onésimus, Master Joseph Ateba and Ateba Yené (father).

According to an anonymous and unsigned note (the author of this epistle chose not to sign his name but offered his observation about Ajoulat-Mbida affair) dated 17 May 1954, the break between the Bloc and Mbida would come from the fact that the chairman of Bloc, Louis-Paul Aujoulat was convinced that Mbida has been informing his political opponents. Aujoulat let him know about his thoughts and in reaction to this, Mbida decided to leave the Cameroonian Democratic Bloc and create his own movement, the Coordinating Committee of Cameroon. However, Germain Tsala Mekongo, former comrade-in-arms of Mbida, believes that this break is due to the jealousy of the other Cameroonian Democratic Bloc members who were excessively concerned about the growing influence of André-Marie Mbida within the Bloc. Abel Eyinga rather thinks that it is the opposition of Louis-Paul Aujoulat and the Steering Committee of Cameroonian Democratic Bloc to see Mbida run for the post of Adviser of the Assembly of French Union which is the true cause of the break between the main protagonists. Mbida did not agree with this directive of Louis-Paul Aujoulat and Bloc. Thus, he ran for election and gained seat, then he became Adviser of the Assembly of French Union on 16 October 1953. Moreover, one can read in the Abel Eyinga book "Elected in spite of himself, Mbida draws conclusions from the attitude of layman missionary by breaking definitively with him, with the organization Aujoulat oriented (French: "Aujoulatistes'’) also: "the BDC".

Following the bloody events of May 1955, repressed by the colonial administrator Roland Pré then by the dissolution of Cameroonian nationalist movements and the incarceration of several nationalist militants, Mbida led an active campaign for the amnesty for political prisoners. He also built on a small, mimeographed bulletin, "NKU, Le Tam-Tam'’.

=== Conquest of the Palais Bourbon ===
André-Marie Mbida stood for election to Parliament at the French National Assembly on 2 January 1956 in the third electoral district of the UN Trust Territory of the Cameroons under French administration. Like socialists, he acts as an advocate of poor people, small-scale farmers, supports minorities and he includes short-term amelioratory measures and long-term structural solutions for the little people and the oppressed. Economically, he proposes the increasing the price of key export commodities, cocoa and coffee, and the elimination of intermediaries that disadvantage the small-scale farmers. He still defends the officials, the autochthonous or traditional chiefs that he proposes to remunerate. He claims an evolving institutions.

He demands a purge of managerial staff in the French Union. He claims "a progressive advance from Cameroon to its autonomy, and later to its independence" (French: " un acheminement progressif du Cameroun vers son autonomie, et plus tard vers son indépendance "). In addition, he defends Catholic values. Thus, he advocates the fight "against secularism in general" (French: " contre le laïcisme en général "). He wrote: "I will defend private education and I shall always support that the territory administration covers the teaching personnel salaries of this one" (French: " Je défendrai toujours l'enseignement privé et soutiendrai toujours que l'administration du territoire prenne à sa charge le traitement du personnel de cet enseignement "). He still intends to encourage monogamy and for him, divorce is not an option for religious marriages. He proposes a "formal opposition to the divorce of religious marriages"(French: une " opposition formelle au divorce de mariages religieux ").

During the campaign trail, one can read on a leaflet distributed to voters : "Voting for Matin Abega, André Fouda, Charles Awono-Onana, Benoît Bindzi, Marc Etende, Philippe Mbarga – It's giving one's vote to Aujoulat – It's giving one's vote to Roland Pré – It's voting for the Cameroonian Democratic Bloc – The incorporation of Cameroon into France, the return to the Indigenousness Code (The Code de l'indigénat), the tax increases. Martin Abega and André Fouda are the candidates of the [French colonial] administration. Voters, be careful, avoid all this list. Give one's vote only for the list of André-Marie Mbida – the list of the watchful and brave cock". (French: " Voter Matin Abega, André Fouda, Charles Awono-Onana, Benoît Bindzi, Marc Etende, Philippe Mbarga – c'est voter Aujoulat – c'est voter Roland Pré – c'est voter le BDC – L'intégration du Cameroun à la France, le retour à l'indigénat, l'augmentation des impôts. Martin Abega et André Fouda sont les candidats de l'Administration. Electeurs, Electrices, soyez attentifs, évitez toutes cette liste. Votez seulement la liste André-Marie Mbida – la liste du coq vigilant et courageux ").

In his profession of faith to voters, Mbida wrote: "Dear voters, if you approve, if you feel that the third electoral district should be represented in the French National Assembly by a native, not by a very harmful intruders, all vote for André-Marie Mbida on January 2, 1956"(French: " Chers Electeurs et Electrices, si vous l'approuvez, si vous estimez que la troisième circonscription mérite d'être représentée à l'Assemblée Nationale par un natif et non-par un très nuisible intrus, votez tous, le 2 janviers 1956, pour André-Marie Mbida ").

Mbida gained seat with 66,354 votes against 47,001 votes for Charles Assalé and against 20,517 votes for Louis-Paul Aujoulat. The latter held the seat since the Liberation of France and was involved in several government departments from 1949 to 1955. Mbida became the first native Cameroonian to be elected Member of Parliament at the French National Assembly by the College of personal Status (French: Collège de statut personnel).

=== Head of autonomous State of Cameroon ===
On 31 January 1956, Mbida was both appointed to the Law and Justice Commission and to the Commission of overseas territories of the French National Assembly. He also belonged to the Commission mandated to reform the Title VIII of the French Constitution, on the French Union dated 27 October 1947. In addition, he is designated to serve on the Supreme Labour Council and the Steering Committee of the Investment Fund for Economic and Social Development (French: FIDES), that is a former government agency of colonial-area France, which was established to finance and co-ordinate the provision of facilities for the French colonial territories. His election was confirmed on 14 February 1956 and he immediately joined the SFIO Socialist Group at the French National Assembly and worked alongside Gaston Defferre, Gérard Jaquet and Pierre Messmer who draft the Loi Cadre (1956 Overseas Reform Act) on the autonomy of French colonial territories and the UN trust territories under French administration in Sub-Saharan Africa.

NKU, le Tam-Tam in its edition of March 1956 to justify his membership to the SFIO Socialist Group by saying that he could not stand alone at the French National Assembly and that the group's policy SFIO seemed to be the lesser evil among all those existing at that moments at French Parliament. He spoke rarely to the French National Assembly. He mainly took part in two major debates: the Loi Cadre in March 1956 and the status of Cameroon in March 1957.

On 23 December 1956, the Territorial Assembly of Cameroon (French: Assemblée Territoriale du Cameroun, ATCAM) was replaced by the Legislative Assembly of Cameroon (French: Assemblée Législative du Cameroun, ALCAM) and parliamentary elections were scheduled. Candidates were authorized to present themselves in their own name. Mbida and his team (Cococam et affiliated memberships) stood for election. At ALCAM, they created the Parliamentary Group of Cameroonian Democrats composed of 21 members with Mbida as leader. Mbida set up the internal autonomy of the UN Trust Territory of the Cameroons under French administration. On 16 April 1957, the latter became an autonomous State. On 12 May 1957, by 56 votes against 10 votes and 4 abstentions, he was appointed first President of the Council of Ministers, first head of government and the facto Head of State of French speaking Cameroon. This designation was very symbolic because he was the second African-born Prime Minister in Sub-Saharan Africa and the first Head of State of Cameroon.

While in Paris in September 1957, he presented Cameroon as a pilot State in Africa. Moreover, he justified the UN trust to French administration until the complete independence and a seat (of Cameroon) at the UN, then he announced that this development strengthens the Franco-Cameroonian friendship.

Mbida also confronted openly and directly the French, this greatly pleased the Cameroonian people. He has accordingly decided to end racial segregation that occurred in neighbourhoods where white men used to live and in their pubs. He ordered the settlers to remove from their pubs, all offensive posters that they put and which were labelled "No dogs and no Blacks'’. Any settler accused of racism was immediately expelled by his order of Cameroonian territory, once he was notified. Thus, in a few months of power, André-Marie Mbida expelled more French than what has been done in 50 years of independence.

He also crossed swords with the Catholic clergy of Cameroon which was controlled by the French. As a former seminarian, he confronted the white priests on the Cameroonization the clergy. He therefore became the initiator of the movement promoting the designation of Cameroonian priests in parishes. This activism earned him the hatred of Bishop René Graffin, Bishop of Yaoundé. These actions greatly increased the popularity of André-Marie Mbida.

With 15 members of his caucus, the Cameroonian democrats, he effectively created the Cameroonian Party of Democrats (French: Parti des Démocrates Camerounais (PDC)) with the election of the executive committee – the adoption of a political platform – a motto: "God – Patrie – Justice – Equality" – an emblem: "the watchful and brave cock’’ (used since his election to the Palais Bourbon) at Abong-Mbang, on 12 January 1958.

Mbida knew that Cameroon was a relatively young country with no infrastructure nor skilled political elite, and he proposed a project to train a qualified (efficient) elite in a period of ten years. French officials saw that Mbida was an intelligent politician and as he also wanted to end racial segregation, then the French settlers began to criticise him.

Indeed, while the Elysée asked him to support the idea of granting, in a short term, a somewhat of independence (i.e. an incomplete independence or a puppet independence) of Cameroon, he took deeply offence by saying : "(...) what does that mean a somewhat of independence ? either there is an independence or there is not ... It can not be a semi-independence or a semblance of independence (...)" (French: " (...) ça veut dire quoi, une certaine indépendance ? Soit c'est l'indépendance, soit ça ne l'est pas... Il ne saurait y avoir de semi-indépendance ou de semblant-indépendance (...) "). He was opposed to this French policy consisting of fudging commitments, he said: "for 51 years, you did train Cameroonian people, now you want to go : this is unacceptable" (French: " pendant 51 ans, vous n'avez pas formé de gens, à présent vous voulez vous en aller : pas question "). On 27 February 1959, André-Marie MBIDA confirmed these manoeuvrings at the United Nations Fourth Committee of the UN General Assembly, he said that: "I was flatly opposed to these proposals, because I considered them illegal, and also because I saw in them as the beginnings of integration of Cameroon within the French Union" (French: " J'avais refusé catégoriquement ces propositions, car je les jugeais illégales, et aussi parce que je voyais en elles, l'amorce d'une intégration dans l'Union française").

On 24 October 1957, he introduced to the Legislative Assembly of Cameroon, a bill establishing an emblem of the State of Cameroon. On 26 October 1957, he filled the bill on the adoption of the national anthem "The Rallying Song", the motto of Cameroon "Peace – Work – Fatherland" and National Day "on May 10, date of the first session of the Legislative Assembly of Cameroon" instead of 14 July, the national day of France.

Nevertheless, the autonomous State of Cameroun under French mandate did not have right to choose an anthem, a motto or a flag that could be different from those in use in France. In addition, the status of 16 April 1957 on the autonomy of the State of Cameroon should have this right.

Furthermore, according to the Trusteeship Agreements for the Territory of the Cameroons under French administration of 13 December 1946, the French administration should have let floating the flag of the United Nations on the administration building in Cameroon. The French colonial administration did not respect this principle by floating only the French flag. This was not consistent with the trusteeship agreements which provided that in any such territory, only the administration was entrusted to the trustee State, in that case France and the UK.

Also, he was confronted to turmoils, to a crisis of confidence due to difficulties in establishing a minimum of order in the department of Nyong-et-Kellé, while France still perform the essential of the repression to the rise of the anti-imperialism.

=== The coup d'état of Jean Ramadier ===
On 25 January, Jean Ramadier was in Paris, where he met with the Deputy Prime Minister, Minister of the Interior Ahmadou Ahidjo. Jean Ramadier became High Commissioner of the French Republic in Cameroon, he replaced Pierre Messmer. He arrived in Cameroon on 3 February 1958 without his family and only a small suitcase as a personal baggage. On 4 February, he informed Mbida that he had a solution to solve the problem of Cameroon : breaking the interest of the Union of the Peoples of Cameroon by applying its program without it. Mbida went indignant that French High Commissioner may have had such a thought. Ramadier decided acting and interfering in the internal politics of the autonomous State of Cameroon.

On 10 February 1958, Jean Ramadier delivered a speech at the Legislative Assembly of Cameroon. In his speech, he stated that France is prepared to grant independence to Cameroon in the near future. The next day, on 11 February 1958, Mbida, who has previously refused the idea of somewhat of independence (i.e. a pupped independence), raised his voice during the Council of Ministers. Mbida informed Ramadier that the French High Commissioner has no right to interfere in the internal affairs of the autonomous State of Cameroon and to talk about the independence of Cameroon. Ramadier retorted by saying that the independence does not fall within the competencies of government of Cameroon but of the High Commissioner of the French Republic in Cameroon. This was the beginning of hostility to the top of the State.

After leaving the Council of Ministers, Jean Ramadier conversed again with Ahmadou Ahidjo. On the evening of 11 February 1958, dramatic turn of events, the parliamentary group Cameroonian Union of Ahmadou Ahidjo dissociated from Mbida and resigns from the government coalition. To this end, he published a press release. As soon as the press release issued, the parliamentary group of Independent Peasants showed solidarity with the group of Cameroonian Union and also resigned from the Mdida's government coalition. The press in Cameroon has as a headline "the Bamiléké (with the exception of Mathias Djoumessi) show solidarity with the North's elected members'’. Also on 11 February, Ramadier met Daniel Kemajou, president of ALCAM and asked him to provide his efforts to convince Mbida to resign or to push out Mbida.

Pursuant to his mandate and powers conferred upon him, strictly speaking in the texts of the State of Cameroon, Mbida formed a new government and Ramadier refused to ratify the government reshuffle. In accordance with Article 19 of the Status of Cameroon on 16 April 1957, it was not the responsibility of the high commissioner to appreciate, to evaluate, to express an opinion on the names of ministers selected by the Prime Minister or to refuse to ratify a government reshuffle. In addition, it may remove the Prime Minister from office.

The ministers who have resigned refused to leave their ministry and let pass of the new ministers. Mbida ask to that Ramadier to take the appropriate actions. Ramadier informed him that Ahmadou Ahidjo, Djoya Arouna, Adama Haman and Ndjiné Talba Malla asked him (via a letter signed by latters which he showed) not to yield to the injunctions of the Prime Minister. Mbida decided to inform supervisors of the High Commissioner of the French Republic in Cameroon. He travelled by plane on the evening of 13 February and arrived Friday, 14 February in the morning. On 12 February 1958, at 06 PM, it is unanimously adopted the immediate recall of Ramadier by the Cabinet of French Prime Minister. Mbida was informed of this good news as soon as he went out of his plane : the High Commissioner, Jean Ramadier, was summoned to Paris of extreme urgency, by Gérard Jaquet, the Minister of Overseas France. Ramadier is expected Saturday, 15 February.

Jean Ramadier, refused to go to Paris and he sent several telegrams stating that the French government asked him to accomplish a mission in Cameroon. He said that it is neither the day nor the time to retreat from this position by making him wearing the hat. He says that he is ready to complete his mission, to fulfill his mandate, at all costs. One can read in his telegrams: "As I have indicated, the operation was conducted very quickly because Mbida at the head of the government became impossible. The opposition to his person and more even to his methods grew stronger every day" (French: " Comme je vous l'ai indiqué, l'opération a été menée très rapidement parce que Mbida à la tête du gouvernement devenait impossible. L'opposition à sa personne et plus encore à ses méthodes se renforçait chaque jour"). "The situation became worse by the hour and the press releases and the untimely telegrams of Mbida have overexcited public opinion to such an extent that it was difficult to predict. (...) We got to the point where things must be said clearly, even sharply. I never asked coming to Cameroon, you have named me because others have not been approved. (...) Everyone must now take his responsibility, I took mine. I intend to assume all the consequences. (...)" (French: "La situation empire d'heure en heure et les communiqués et télégrammes intempestifs de Mbida ont surexcité l'opinion à tel point qu'il était difficile à prévoir. (...) nous en sommes arrivés au point où les choses doivent êtres dites clairement, voire brutalement. Je n'ai jamais demandé à venir au Cameroun, vous m'y avez nommé parce que d'autres n'ont pas été agréées. (...) Chacun doit maintenant prendre ses responsabilités, j'ai pris les miennes. J'entends en assumer toutes les conséquences. (...)").

Throughout the day of Friday, 14 February, André-Marie Mbida and Mathias Djoumessi who accompanied him, are received at the Ministry of Overseas France, at the Prime Ministry and then at the Presidency of the Republic of France by René Coty. The French press is boiling. Everywhere Mbida is said to be right. The French Right-wing and especially the Popular Republican Movement (French: Mouvement Républicain Populaire, MRP), was all to his cause. Jean Ramadier exceeded its powers. Saturday, 15 February evening, Mbida resigned from the Socialist SFIO parliamentary group and came back to Yaoundé. His resignation from SFIO parliamentary group took effect on 20 February 1958.

While Mbida was in Paris, Jean Ramadier donated 200,000 CFA francs to any Cameroonian deputy who is ganging up on Mbida. He instigated a vote of no confidence against the Mbida's government and wrote the speech of Ahmadou Ahidjo. When Mbida returned to Cameroon, he addressed by telegram his resignation to the President of the French Republic, René Coty, at Prime Minister, Félix Gaillard and at Minister of Overseas France, Gérard Jaquet. In his telegram, he wrote: "I decided not lend nor subject myself to these illegal manoeuvrings, and I present today my resignation at the High Commissioner as Prime Minister, Head of the Cameroonian government" (French: " J'ai donc décidé de ne pas me prêter ni soumettre plus longtemps à ces manœuvres illégales et je remets ce jour au haut commissaire ma démission de Premier ministre, Chef du gouvernement camerounais"). He succeeded in having Ramadier transferred to another post. He replaced by Ahmadou Ahidjo who became Cameroon's first président on, 5 May 1960. Ahidjo who was at the beginning his friend, wanted to integrate Mbida in his first government but Mbida disagreed with Ahidjo's extremely pro-French politics and he refused and went into exile in Conakry.

On 16 September 1958, when he was passing through Paris, André-Marie Mbida pronounced himself in favour of the immediate independence. On 3 October 1958, his political party published a press release where it demanded "the immediate independence of Cameroon – the total amnesty – the lifting of French mandate'’. His party, the Cameroonian Party of Democrats, will demand even the independence for 1 January 1959.

In Conakry, he drafted, jointly with Félix-Roland Moumié and Ernest Ouandié, a political minimum platform for Cameroon. Mbida came back to Cameroon in 1960 and he regained in a very short time period a national political audience that thirteen months of exile in Conakry (Guinea) had somewhat withered. On 10 April 1960, he was elected as deputy in his district. He obtained 23,770 votes against 0. Following these elections, the audience and even the popularity of Mbida were well established in Cameroon with a predominance in the region of Nyong and Sanaga. Nevertheless, the final battle that he would deliver against the Ahidjo's Government, the battle against the single-party state, the one-party system, would sound the knell of his political life.

=== The final battle against the single-party state ===
After he denounced the continued presence of French troops and French military bases in Cameroon while accusing the north of being dominated by the Lamibe in an obsolete feudalism, Ahidjo dismissed the Democrats from their ministerial duties. In the years 1961–1962, the wave of rallying, dissolutions and merging of other parties with the Cameroon Union of Ahidjo considerably weakened the Cameroonian Party of Democrats in the National Assembly in 1962.

In January 1962, following the Ahidjo's soldiers' dispersal of the Union of the Peoples of Cameroon during its first conference since their rehabilitation, André-Marie Mbida and other opposition leaders, i.e., Marcel Bebey Eyidi (General Secretary of the Labor Party of Cameroon), Charles Okala (General Secretary of the Socialist Party of Cameroon) and Théodore Mayi Matip (deputy and Caucus Chair of The Union of the Peoples of Cameroon), founded a joint committee National United Front (French: Front national Unifié, FNU) with Mbida as leader. On 23 June 1962, FNU published a manifesto, signed by Mbida, Okala, Eyidi and Matip, in which they affirm their refusal to join the single-party state. The signatories add that a single-party state inevitably leads to dictatorship. Consequently, they were arrested and imprisoned in North Cameroun. This incarceration resulted in a significant deterioration of Mbida's physical appearance: he fell ill and became nearly blind. Following his release from prison in 1965, he was placed under house arrest. In 1966 he obtained permission to seek treatment in France at des Quinze-Vingts Hospital. On returning to Cameroon two years later, he was again placed under house arrest, in Yaoundé, from 3 August 1968 to 30 May 1972.

Until his death André-Marie Mbida refused to subscribe to the idea of a single-state-party; the Cameroonian Party of Democrats refused to merge with the Cameroon National Union (CNU) (French: Union Nationale Camerounaise, UNC). Mbida nearly gave up politics. The last moments of his life were made especially difficult by loneliness. In his 63rd year he blindly removed to the realm of celestial rewards at the Pitié-Salpêtrière Hospital, where he had been admitted two short weeks earlier.
