= 1951 French legislative election in Cameroon =

Elections to the French National Assembly were held in French Cameroons on 17 June 1951.

== Electoral system ==
The four seats allocated to the constituency were elected on two separate electoral rolls; French citizens elected one MP from the first college, whilst non-citizens elected three MPs in the second college, an increase from two seats in November 1946.

== Results ==
=== First college ===
Candidate	Votes	%
Georges Molinatti	1,948	48.74
Jules Pialoux	1,032	25.82
Jean Mausset	515	12.88
Five other candidates	502	12.56
Total	3,997	100.00
Valid votes	3,997	96.48
Invalid/blank votes	146	3.52
Total votes	4,143	100.00
Registered voters/turnout	6,182	67.02
Source: Sternberger et al.

=== Second college ===
==== Seat 1 ====
Candidate	Votes	%
Jules Ninine	45,700	49.60
Njoya Arouna	16,831	18.27
Paul-François Martin	15,163	16.46
Mohaman Mahonde	9,919	10.77
Alexandre Douala Manga Bell	4,515	4.90
Total	92,128	100.00
Valid votes	92,128	99.34
Invalid/blank votes	616	0.66
Total votes	92,744	100.00
Registered voters/turnout	165,326	56.10

==== Seat 2 ====
Candidate	Votes	%
Alexandre Douala Manga Bell	38,043	49.44
Mathias Djoumessi	20,704	26.91
Daniel Kemajou	6,801	8.84
Ruben Um Nyobé	3,077	4.00
Paul Monthé	2,808	3.65
Marcel Bebey Eyidi	1,850	2.40
Eight other candidates	3,667	4.77
Total	76,950	100.00
Valid votes	76,950	99.10
Invalid/blank votes	698	0.90
Total votes	77,648	100.00
Registered voters/turnout	182,372	42.58

==== Seat 3 ====
Candidate	Votes	%
Louis-Paul Aujoulat	28,309	25.46
Charles Assalé	24,540	22.07
Medoune Nvombo	7,617	6.85
Léon Fouletier	6,550	5.89
Alphonse Ndounokon	6,505	5.85
Gaston Kingue-Jong	6,490	5.84
Albert-Paul Ebede	5,589	5.03
Rodolphe-Esome Tokonto	5,458	4.91
Pierre Gam	4,974	4.47
Six other candidates	15,157	13.63
Total	111,189	100.00
Valid votes	111,189	97.39
Invalid/blank votes	2,981	2.61
Total votes	114,170	100.00
Registered voters/turnout	163,146	69.98
