= Socialist Party of Cameroon =

Former political party in Cameroon

The Socialist Party of Cameroon (French: Parti Socialiste Camerounaise, PSC) was a political party in Cameroon.

== History ==
The party was established in November 1959 by former Senator Charles Okala. Together with the Cameroonian National Action Movement, the PSC formed the Group of Cameroonian Progressives to contest the 1960 parliamentary elections. The alliance received 4.5% of the vote, winning seven seats. The alliance joined Ahmadou Ahidjo's Cameroonian Union-led government in May 1960, with Okala becoming and Foreign Minister.

After being convicted of conspiracy, Okala was imprisoned in 1962. He was released in 1965 on the condition that the PSC be dissolved. It merged into the Cameroon National Union in September 1966.
