= Cameroonian National Action Movement =

Defunct political party in Cameroon

The Cameroonian National Action Movement (French: Mouvement d'Action Nationale Camerounaise, MANC) was a political party in French Cameroons.

== History ==
The party was created in March 1956 as by the merger of the Bantu Efoula-Meyong Traditional Association led by Charles Assalé and members of the Ngondo establishment led by Soppo Priso. The French authorities regarded it as a front for the banned Union of the Peoples of Cameroon.

The party contested the December 1956 Territorial Assembly elections. It received 6.7% of the vote, winning 8 of the 70 seats. Its eight MPs became known as the "Group of Eight", who were opposed to the increasing domination of the Cameroonian Union led by Ahmadou Ahidjo. However, it joined Ahidjo's government in 1958.

Prior to the 1960 elections the party formed the Group of Cameroonian Progressives together with the Socialist Party of Cameroon. The alliance won seven seats, and Assalé became prime minister. However, the alliance was dissolved the following year as it merged into the Cameroonian Union.

== MPs ==
Term	MPs
1956–1960	Betote Akwa, Charles Assalé, Soppo Priso, Gaston Behle, Hans Dissake, Ekwabi Ewane, Aloys Ntonga, François Obam
