= Group of Cameroonian Progressives =

The Group of Cameroonian Progressives (French: Groupe des Progressistes du Cameroun, GPC) was a political alliance in Cameroon.

== History ==
The alliance was formed by the Cameroonian National Action Movement and the Socialist Party of Cameroon. The alliance received 4.5% of the vote in the April 1960 parliamentary elections, winning seven seats.

The alliance joined Ahmadou Ahidjo's Cameroonian Union-led government in May 1960, with GPC members Charles Assalé and Charles Okala becoming prime minister and foreign minister. The alliance merged into the UC the following year.
