= June 1946 French legislative election in Cameroon =

Elections to the French National Assembly were held in French Cameroons on 2 June 1946, with a second round of voting on 30 June.

== Electoral system ==
The two seats allocated to the constituency were elected on two separate electoral rolls; French citizens elected one MP from the first college, whilst non-citizens elected one MP in the second college.

== Results ==
=== First college ===
Candidate	First round		Second round	
Candidate	Votes	%	Votes	%
Louis-Paul Aujoulat	578	46.65	575	62.10
Georges Molinatti	340	27.44	258	27.86
Damane	192	15.50	93	10.04
Other candidates	129	10.41		
Total	1,239	100.00	926	100.00
Valid votes	1,239	98.65	926	89.38
Invalid/blank votes	17	1.35	110	10.62
Total votes	1,256	100.00	1,036	100.00
Registered voters/turnout	2,198	57.14	2,198	47.13
Source: Sternberger et al.

=== Second college ===
Candidate	Votes	%
Alexandre Douala Manga Bell	5,119	55.93
Jules Ninine	2,913	31.83
Charles Assalé	480	5.24
Other candidates	641	7.00
Total	9,153	100.00
Valid votes	9,153	99.76
Invalid/blank votes	22	0.24
Total votes	9,175	100.00
Registered voters/turnout	15,232	60.24
Source: Sternberger et al.
