= November 1946 French legislative election in Cameroon =

Elections to the French National Assembly were held in French Cameroons on 10 November 1946.

== Electoral system ==
The three seats allocated to the constituency were elected on two separate electoral rolls; French citizens elected one MP from the first college, whilst non-citizens elected two MPs in the second college.

== Results ==
=== First college ===
Candidate	Votes	%
Louis-Paul Aujoulat	615	51.21
Georges Molinatti	449	37.39
André-Marie Meynieux	92	7.66
René-Arthur Baudet	45	3.75
Total	1,201	100.00
Valid votes	1,201	93.17
Invalid/blank votes	88	6.83
Total votes	1,289	100.00
Registered voters/turnout	2,611	49.37
Source: Sternberger et al.

=== Second college ===
==== Seat 1 ====
Candidate	Votes	%
Jules Ninine	2,684	28.00
Njoya Arouna	2,618	27.31
Gaston Kingue Jong	2,424	25.28
Mahonde	1,387	14.47
Satai Poum Happy	474	4.94
Total	9,587	100.00
Valid votes	9,587	96.95
Invalid/blank votes	302	3.05
Total votes	9,889	100.00
Registered voters/turnout	16,294	60.69
Source: Sternberger et al.

==== Seat 2 ====
Candidate	Votes	%
Alexandre Douala Manga Bell	7,659	69.26
Amagou Manga	1,681	15.20
Charles Assalé	715	6.47
Four other candidates	1,003	9.07
Total	11,058	100.00
Valid votes	11,058	98.20
Invalid/blank votes	203	1.80
Total votes	11,261	100.00
Registered voters/turnout	22,682	49.65
Source: Sternberger et al.
