= 1945 French legislative election in Cameroon =

Elections to the French National Assembly were held in French Cameroons on 21 October 1945, with a second round of voting on 18 November. Louis-Paul Aujoulat and Alexandre Douala Manga Bell were elected.

== Electoral system ==
The two seats allocated to the constituency were elected on two separate electoral rolls; French citizens elected one MP from the first college, whilst non-citizens elected one MP in the second college.

== Background ==
The relationship between the French and the African population of Cameroon were poor at the time of the election; the Africans were unenthusiastic about French colonialism and their economic situation. Although trade unions had been legalised in 1944, commercial interests had subsequently formed the Etats Généreaux de la Colonisation Française, which opposed abolishing forced labour. Announcements from the new body infuriated African workers, leading to the strikes starting on 24 September, which turned into full-scale riots. The violence led to the deaths of eight Africans and the secretary of the Chamber of Commerce.

== Campaign ==
Alexandre Douala Manga Bell, chief of the Duala, ran for the second college, but was opposed by Governor Henri Pierre Nicolas. Although some of his supporters were jailed, this only served to increase his popularity.

The first college election was a close race between Louis-Paul Aujoulat, a Catholic missionary, defeating the candidate representing commercial interests.

== Results ==
=== First College ===
Candidate	First round		Second round	
Candidate	Votes	%	Votes	%
Louis-Paul Aujoulat	371	27.14	640	47.27
Georges Molinatti	322	23.56	365	26.96
Jules Ninine	316	23.12	349	25.78
Seven other candidates	358	26.19		
Total	1,367	100.00	1,354	100.00
Valid votes	1,367	96.81	1,354	98.12
Invalid/blank votes	45	3.19	26	1.88
Total votes	1,412	100.00	1,380	100.00
Registered voters/turnout	1,991	70.92	1,970	70.05
Source: Sternberger et al.

=== Second College ===
Candidate	First round		Second round	
Candidate	Votes	%	Votes	%
Alexandre Douala Manga Bell	3,779	38.77	5,274	51.62
André Fouda	1,648	16.91	4,612	45.14
Njoya Arouna	1,654	16.97		
Amougu	1,061	10.89		
Pierre Ripaud	214	2.20	197	1.93
Albert Rouly	131	1.34	133	1.30
Five other candidates	1,260	12.93		
Total	9,747	100.00	10,216	100.00
Valid votes	9,747	98.66	10,216	99.01
Invalid/blank votes	132	1.34	102	0.99
Total votes	9,879	100.00	10,318	100.00
Registered voters/turnout	12,468	79.23	12,588	81.97
Source: Sternberger et al.

== Aftermath ==
Following the elections, Senegalese MP Lamine Guèye attempted to persuade all the African MPs to form an African Bloc, which would be affiliated with the SFIO. However, the attempt failed, and both Aujoulat and Douala Manga Bell joined the Popular Republican Movement.
