= Charles Okala =

Cameroonian politician

Rene-Guy Charles Okala
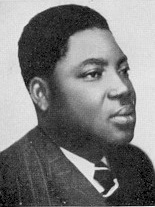
- Charles Okala

Minister of Foreign Affairs of Cameroon
- In office 1960–1961
- Preceded by: Position established

Minister of Justice of Cameroon

Member of the French Senate
- In office 1947–1955
- Constituency: French Equatorial Africa

Personal details
- Born: Rene-Guy Charles Okala; 19 October 1910 Bilomo, Centre Region, Cameroon
- Died: 16 September 1973 (aged 62) Paris, France
- Party: Socialist Party of Cameroon, Cameroonian Union; Cameroon National Union(other party)
- Occupation: Politician, diplomat

Rene-Guy Charles Okala (19 October 1910 – 16 September 1973) was a Cameroonian politician. Born in Bilomo in the Centre Region in 1910, he attended a Catholic primary school in Yaoundé.

Following World War II, Okala was elected to the local assembly and became a member of the French Senate in 1947, serving until 1955. He served as Cameroon's Minister of Justice. In 1959 he established the Socialist Party of Cameroon (PSC), which contested the 1960 elections as part of the Group of Cameroonian Progressives. In 1960 he was appointed the independent Cameroon's first Foreign Minister.

Okala was sacked in 1961 and arrested in June 1962, then tried for and convicted of conspiracy. He was released from prison in 1965 as part of a deal that involved the dissolution of the PSC, then joined the Cameroonian Union and its successor the Cameroon National Union. He was appointed a roving ambassador by President Ahmadou Ahidjo in 1968, before falling out of favour. He died in Paris in 1973.
