= RDPC =

- Cameroon People's Democratic Movement, Rassemblement démocratique du Peuple Camerounais, a political party in Cameroon
- Democratic Assembly of the Comoran People, Rassemblement démocratique du Peuple Comorien, a political party of the Comoros
