= People's Front for Unity and Peace =

The People's Front for Unity and Peace (French: Front populaire de l'unité et la paix, FPUP) was a political party in Cameroon.

== History ==
The party was established as a Bamileke-dominated breakaway from the Union of the Peoples of Cameroon, with its leaders including former ministers Pierre Kamden Ninyim, Wandji Nkuimy, Philippe Achinguy and Victor Kanga. In the 1960 elections it received 10.8% of the vote, winning 19 seats and becoming the second-largest party in the National Assembly after the Cameroonian Union (UC).

In 1961 the party merged into the UC.
