= 1984 presidential election =

1984 presidential election may refer to:

- 1984 Algerian presidential election
- 1984 Burundian presidential election
- 1984 Cameroonian presidential election
- 1984 Comorian presidential election
- 1984 Salvadoran presidential election
- 1984 Icelandic presidential election
- 1984 Seychellois presidential election
- 1984 United States presidential election
- 1984 Uruguayan presidential election
- 1984 Zairean presidential election
