= Julienne Keutcha =

Cameroonian politician

Member of the National Assembly
- In office 1960–1972
- Constituency: Menoua

Personal details
- Born: 21 October 1924 Ngwatta, Kamerun
- Died: 2000 (aged 75–76)

Julienne Keutcha (21 October 1924 – 2000) was a Cameroonian politician. In 1960 she was the first woman elected to the National Assembly of French Cameroon.

== Biography ==
Keutcha was born in 1924 in the village of Ngwatta near Santchou. She graduated from a beauty institute in Paris, and became a childcare worker. She married Jean Keutcha, who later became a minister and ambassador.

She was a candidate in the 1960 parliamentary elections and became the first woman elected to the National Assembly. She remained in office until 1972. During her time in parliament she was secretary of the Bureau and sat on the Foreign Affairs Committee. She also became a member of the bureau of the Cameroon National Union and was the only woman member of the committee at the time.

She died in 2000.
