= 1957 Cameroon by-election =

A by-election to the French National Assembly was held in French Cameroons on 23 June 1957. The election was held after the resignation of Alexandre Douala Manga Bell, the holder of the second seat in the second college. Bell was re-elected with 33% of the vote.

== Results ==
Candidate	Votes	%
Alexandre Douala Manga Bell	54,942	32.83
Ngouankeo Tchoumba	50,023	29.89
Pierre Dzietham	44,681	26.70
Jacques Ngom	8,065	4.82
Timothé Maah	7,293	4.36
Pierre Tayou	2,365	1.41
Total	167,369	100.00
Valid votes	167,369	98.43
Invalid/blank votes	2,663	1.57
Total votes	170,032	100.00
Registered voters/turnout	461,232	36.86
Source: Sternberger et al.
