= Planned liberalism =

Cameroonian historical economic policy

Planned liberalism (French: Libéralisme planifié) was a post-independence economic development policy aimed at integrating the economies of East and West Cameroon. However, several African countries have followed a similar model. It has been described as African Dirigisme, and noted to be linking the private sector with development efforts. It has characteristics of a planned economy, economic nationalism, and crony capitalism. Another view is that planned liberalism is neo-Keynesian.

== Planned liberalism in Cameroon ==
=== During Ahmadou Ahidjo's presidency ===
In 1965, Cameroon changed its economic philosophy from African socialism under the guidance of its first president, Ahmadou Ahidjo. Under planned liberalism, the state began to regulate and manage natural resources and to guide foreign investment into specific economic sectors or geographic areas. In the process, the government partnered with foreign firms to set up various parastatal enterprises (government-affiliated entities designed to meet commercial and state capitalist objectives). Meanwhile, it encouraged private enterprise, investment, and the operation of market forces.

Liberal planning, according to Ahidjo, led to direct prosperity. He stated that, "there was no longer an absolute gap between the two formulas" (i.e., Marxist socialism and Western capitalism), Ahidjo was known to be an anti-communist, and encouraged Cameroonians to start their enterprises so that a private sector could emerge. With the economic decline in the 1970s and 1980s, the government privatized parastatal companies.

The policy was strongly interventionist and incorporated elements of economic nationalism. An important political aspect of liberal planning was that Western investment increased while the non-aligned foreign policy could be continued. Full identification with the West was thus not possible. Because liberal planning was primarily seen as an economic model rather than a political one, the Ahidjo government did not consider it necessary to democratize the Republic of Cameroon.

Abel Eyinga traces the theory of liberal planning to Gaullist economic doctrine and views it as "the African equivalent of 'participation'". According to him, the concept first emerged around 1965 in Gabon, where it was possibly elaborated differently than later in Cameroon, which embraced it as an economic ideology.

To develop, the President of the Republic of Cameroon at that time set himself the objective of self-centered development and the doctrine of "planned liberalism", which he defines as follows: "We intend to submit, henceforth, our international economic relations to our objectives of internal development, that is to say, we intend to promote a truly integrated economy, characterized by effective control of the principal factors of development." It is, at bottom, a humane socialism which seeks its path pragmatically.

President Ahmadou Ahidjo El Hadj explained this choice at the time by declaring (translated from French from the original publication in Le Monde diplomatique);

"We believe that the most dynamic factor driving our initial progress is our choice of economic liberalism—a Liberalism wherein the prospect of legitimate profit stimulates initiative and freedom fosters imagination. However, that is an ordered, selective liberalism, not an archaic one; it is a liberalism that finds its full expression within the predefined framework of the Plan. In economic matters—and particularly regarding investment—we place greater faith in the positive psychological impact of freedom and confidence than in the results of actions driven by compulsion. In the current national and global climate, this policy of liberalism is undoubtedly the best for our country and, consequently, best serves the interest of our people. It represents a successful alignment between the development ideal to which we aspire and the reality on the ground. It embodies the realism that must guide our actions. We therefore openly declare that private investments—whether domestic or foreign—will always be welcome in Cameroon; they are guaranteed full profitability through the mechanisms of our Investment Code, which was specifically designed to reflect our liberal approach. At the same time—let us state that this policy does not preclude the policy—or indeed the necessity—of a public mixed sector. Such a sector serves as a tool for the government to drive, oversee, and steer the national economy as a whole, while also safeguarding the fundamental interests of the State."

He further stated:

"We wish (...) to lay the foundations for a social democracy which rejects every idea of alienation of man, even if this alienation carries within it the promise of a better life for our children and grandchildren. We are therefore in favor of liberalism, a modern, planned liberalism, that is, one that is kept in check by state regulation. We therefore regard private ownership of the means of production and their utilization for private profit as a sign of progress."

Kamé Samuel, described as one of Ahmadou Ahidjo's principal ideologues, was reported to have quoted Hitler and Goebbels favorably, and referred enthusiastically to the "Nazi Youth" and to the "UNR organizations during the military coup in Algiers". The French ambassador to Cameroon, Jean-Pierre Bénard, in a report addressed to his hierarchy, recognizes that "Mr. Kamé does not hide his preferences for a fascist-style policy". Paul Audat, a colonial administrator who was close to Kamé, shares this view, stating, "He (Kamé) is a student who became a fascist. A single-party fascist, a supporter of the absolute power of the head of state, who was always very virulent against the UPC." Whether Kamé Samuel's influence on planned liberalism is known is not known.

=== During Paul Biya's presidency ===
Paul Biya, the second and current President of Cameroon since 1982, has emphasized a similar ideology of Communitarian liberalism. The difference between planned liberalism and communitarian liberalism is that communitarian liberalism is more supportive of privatization, but the idea of a third way is still part of the ideology. While the National Union for Democracy and Progress embraces economic liberalism and anti-socialism they also advocate for planned liberalism.

=== Criticism ===
Critics claim that planned liberalism has failed due to widespread corruption, overwhelming government bureaucracy, almost no development of the country and ill-advised government backing of certain foreign investors. These faults became evident during the economic crisis of the mid-1980s. Cameroon, under Paul Biya, has increasingly turned to the privatization of state-owned industries to stimulate its economy.

== Other countries ==
=== Rwanda ===
During the rule of dictator Juvénal Habyarimana (1973–1994), Rwanda adopted an economic policy referred to as "liberal planning" ("Libéralisme planifié"). Liberal planning as an economic ideology was proclaimed at the third congress of the ruling Mouvement Révolutionnaire Nationale pour le Développement (MRND) in 1980 and involved a six-year development plan (1980–1986) aimed at foreign (Western) investors, self-sufficient food production, better use of human resources, and improved living conditions. In 1988, state-owned enterprises were privatized as part of the liberal planning policy.

=== Ivory Coast ===
Ivory Coast under Félix Houphouët-Boigny from 1960 to 1978 embraced something similar to planned liberalism, afterwards he embraced economic liberalism. The Democratic Party of Ivory Coast claims to be an economic liberal party which excludes state intervention in economic activities. However, the PDCI accommodates state capitalism, but after independence, it is considered only a transitional phase while waiting for Ivorian capitalists to be trained. They embraced state capitalism from 1960 until the 1970s. Under his government, Ivory Coast took the course of liberal free market economy after 1978.

=== Gabon ===
Gabon under Omar Bongo from 1978 until 1987 tried to adopt planned liberalism, before embracing economic liberalism again like in the 1960s and 1970s. From 1987 until 1990 after stopping to advocate for planning liberalism, the government still embraced statist economics, before embracing free markets and capitalism. Omar Bongo developed the philosophy that was referred to as Rénovation (Renovation), the main objective of which was to combat tribalism and regionalism and to create a national identity. Foreign entrepreneurs were attracted, and an attempt was made to create an indigenous middle class. It then became clear that Rénovation had mainly led to predatory capitalism, and therefore the slogan "Rénover la Rénovation" (Renovate the Renovation) was proposed. Predatory capitalism had to be countered by a "directed liberalism" ("libéralisme dirigé") in which the state's role in economic life was strengthened. The president believed that "directed liberalism" was essentially a form of capitalism but would result in a kind of socialism. He probably meant that as many people as possible would benefit from the expected economic growth. Directed and planned liberalism (libéralisme dirigé et planifié) was also applied in other French-speaking African countries as an alternative to liberal capitalism and state socialism. Since 1976, the policy of the country had been oriented towards Le Progressisme Démocratique et Concerté (Democratic and Coordinated Progressivism), although it has never really become clear what this actually entailed, except that according to Omar Bongo it was a philosophy that was in line with "African traditions" and embraced a kind of "community humanism", as well as a continuation of economic liberalism after 1990 again.

=== Other African countries ===
Senegal under Léopold Sédar Senghor embraced, from 1975 onward, a form of planned liberalism, even though it was more of a mixed economy. The First Republic of Madagascar under Philibert Tsiranana (1959–1972) pursued economic policies very similar to liberal planning. Guinea under Lansana Conté embraced planned liberalism from 1985 until 1986 while also advocating for economic liberalism policies. Morocco in the late 1970s until the mid-1980s tried to adopt an economic system similar to the one of planned liberalism.
