= Ramadier =

Ramadier is a French surname. Notable people with the surname include:

- Jean Ramadier (1913–1968), French colonial administrator in West Africa
- Paul Ramadier (1888–1961), French politician
- Pierre Ramadier (1902–1983), French Olympic pole vaulter
