= 1956 Cameroonian Territorial Assembly election =

Territorial Assembly elections were held in French Cameroon on 23 December 1956. The result was a victory for the Cameroonian Union, which won 30 of the 70 seats in the Territorial Assembly. Voter turnout was 41.4%.

== Results ==
Party	Votes	%	Seats
Cameroonian Union	249,693	34.35	30
Cameroonian Party of Democrats	152,000	20.91	20
Independent Peasants	69,457	9.56	8
Cameroonian National Action Movement	48,666	6.70	8
French Section of the Workers' International	18,001	2.48	3
Other parties	189,000	26.00	–
Total	726,817	100.00	69
Registered voters/turnout	1,752,902	–	
Source: Nohlen et al.
