= 1965 Cameroonian presidential election =

Election of Ahmadou Ahidjo

- 23 March 1965
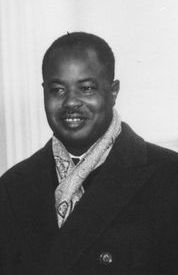
Nominee	Ahmadou Ahidjo
Party	UNC
Popular vote	2,700,697
Percentage	100%
President before election
Ahmadou Ahidjo
UNC
Elected President
Ahmadou Ahidjo
UNC

Presidential elections were held in Cameroon on 23 March 1965. Incumbent Ahmadou Ahidjo was the only candidate, and won 100% of the vote as the candidate of the Cameroonian Union-Kamerun National Democratic Party alliance. Voter turnout was 95%.

== Results ==
Candidate	Party	Votes	%
Ahmadou Ahidjo	UC–KNDP	2,700,697	100.00
Total		2,700,697	100.00
Valid votes		2,700,697	99.95
Invalid/blank votes		1,401	0.05
Total votes		2,702,098	100.00
Registered voters/turnout		2,842,515	95.06
Source: Nohlen et al.
