= 1970 Cameroonian parliamentary election =

- 7 June 1970
- All 50 seats in the National Assembly; 25 seats needed for a majority
Party	Leader	Vote %	Seats	+/–
UNC	Ahmadou Ahidjo	100	50	0
This lists parties that won seats. See the complete results below.

Parliamentary elections were held in Cameroon on 7 June 1970, the first since the country became a one-party state with the Cameroonian National Union (a merger of the Cameroonian Union of French Cameroon and the Kamerun National Democratic Party of Southern Cameroons) as the sole legal party in 1966. In each constituency the party put forward a list of candidates equal to the number of seats available, and ultimately won all 50 seats in the National Assembly with a 95% turnout.

== Results ==
Party	Votes	%	Seats
Cameroonian National Union	2,926,224	100.00	50
Total	2,926,224	100.00	50
Valid votes	2,926,224	99.70	
Invalid/blank votes	8,699	0.30	
Total votes	2,934,923	100.00	
Registered voters/turnout	3,094,886	94.83	
Source: Nohlen et al.
