= 1973 Cameroonian parliamentary election =

- 18 May 1973
- All 120 seats in the National Assembly; 60 seats needed for a majority
| Party | Leader | Vote % | Seats | +/– |
|---|---|---|---|---|
| UNC | Ahmadou Ahidjo | 100 | 120 | +70 |
This lists parties that won seats. See the complete results below.

Parliamentary elections were held in Cameroon on 18 May 1973, the first since the promulgation of the country's new constitution approved in a referendum the previous year. The country was a one-party state at the time, with the Cameroonian National Union as the sole legal party. 2,600 candidates ran for a place on the CNU list, with 120 eventually winning a place on it, equal to the number seats available in the enlarged National Assembly, winning all of them with a 98.4% turnout.

== Results ==
| Party | Votes | % | Seats | +/– |
|---|---|---|---|---|
| Cameroonian National Union | 3,293,428 | 100.00 | 120 | +70 |
| Total | 3,293,428 | 100.00 | 120 | +70 |
| Valid votes | 3,293,428 | 99.95 | | |
| Invalid/blank votes | 1,577 | 0.05 | | |
| Total votes | 3,295,005 | 100.00 | | |
| Registered voters/turnout | 3,348,989 | 98.39 | | |
Source: Nohlen et al.
