= 1980 presidential election =

1980 presidential election may refer to:

- 1980 Austrian presidential election
- 1980 Cameroonian presidential election
- 1980 Honduran presidential election
- 1980 Icelandic presidential election
- 1980 Iranian presidential election
- 1980 Ivorian presidential election
- 1980 Portuguese presidential election
- 1980 South Korean presidential election
- 1980 United States presidential election
