= Jean Ramadier =

French colonial administrator

Governor of Niger
- In office 21 December 1954 – 3 November 1956
- Preceded by: Fernand Georges Gaston Casimir
- Succeeded by: Paul Bordier

Governor of Guinea
- In office 3 Jun 1956 – 29 Jan 1958
- Preceded by: Charles-Henri Bonfils
- Succeeded by: Jean Mauberna

High Commissioner of Cameroon
- In office 5 February 1958 – -
- Succeeded by: Xavier Torre

Personal details
- Born: 1913
- Died: 1968 (aged 54–55)

Jean Ramadier (1 December 1913 – 19 February 1968) was a French colonial administrator in French West Africa shortly before the transition to independence. He was governor of Niger from 1954 to 1956, of Guinea from 1956 to 1958, and briefly high commissioner of Cameroon.

== Early career ==
Jean Ramadier was born in 1913, the son of the French Premier Paul Ramadier. During World War II, Ramadier participated in resistance to the Japanese in Indochina. After being captured, he was tortured through confinement in a bamboo cage by the Kempeitai, the Japanese military police. Released in 1945, on his return to France he promoted a solution where Vietnam would be part of union with France which would help preserve French culture. Ramadier was governor of Niger from 21 December 1954 to 3 November 1956.

== Guinea ==
Ramadier was appointed Governor of Guinea on 3 June 1956. He replaced the more conservative Charles-Henri Bonfils, and was less hostile to the RDA (African Democratic Rally) that was preparing to take power after independence. In 1957, Ahmed Sékou Touré of the RDA became Vice-President of the Territorial Council of Guinea. Given Ramadier's low-profile style, this made Touré in effect the leader of the country in the transition to independence. In a private letter Ramadier said of his successor that Touré claimed direct descent from Samori Ture, the last independent ruler, and intended to combine the Malinke empire and people's democracy under a Franco-African, Leninist-Stalinist dialectic". Ramadier left Guinea in February 1958, and was replaced by Governor Jean Mauberna.

== Cameroon ==
Ramadier became High Commissioner of Cameroon, arriving there on 5 February 1958. He was an advocate of uniting the French and British Cameroons. Shortly after arriving, Ramadier fell out with the autocratic Andre-Marie Mbida, who led the government although his party only had a minority. Ramadier felt that Mbida did not have an adequate mandate. Mbida complained that Ramadier was trying to push Cameroon into independence too fast, and flew to Paris to make his case. He succeeded in having Ramadier transferred to another post, but failed to gain French support for his government and was forced to resign, being replaced by Ahmadou Ahidjo. Mdiba later became the first Prime Minister of pre-independent Cameroon, while Ahidjo became the first president.
