= Emile Andze Andze =

Cameroonian politician

Emile Andze Andze is a Cameroonian politician who has been the Mayor of Yaoundé I, one of the seven urban districts of Yaoundé, since 1996. He is also the National President of the United Councils and Cities of Cameroon (CVUC).

== Political career ==
Andze was first elected as Mayor of Yaoundé I following the January 1996 municipal election. He was re-elected in 2002. A member of the Cameroon People's Democratic Movement (RDPC), Andze was also elected as President of the RDPC's Mfoundi 1 Section in 2002.

Andze was simultaneously the Mayor of Yaoundé I and a Deputy in the National Assembly (député-maire) during the 2002–2007 parliamentary term. A 2004 legal change barred from deputies from holding any other political position, including that of Mayor. Andze sought re-election as the RDPC Section President for Mfoundi 1 in April 2007, and Jules Tana challenged him for the post. Andze was re-elected as Section President, receiving 150 votes against 51 for Tana. Andze was the only one of the RDPC section presidents in Yaoundé who were elected in 2002 to retain his post in 2007.

In the July 2007 municipal election, Andze was re-elected as a municipal councillor and was then promptly re-elected for another five-year term as Mayor of Yaoundé I by the municipal councillors on 31 July 2007; there were 40 votes in favor and one abstention, with no opposing votes. Andze was also re-elected to the National Assembly in the concurrent 2007 parliamentary election, and he took his seat as a Deputy in late August. Later in 2007, Samson Ename Ename, the Secretary-General of the National Assembly, attempted to force Andze and the other deputies who held incompatible functions to take the necessary steps to validate their mandates, but his initiative annoyed the RDPC Parliamentary Group and he subsequently abandoned the effort.

Andze served as National President of CVUC during a transitional period that ended in 2007, and he was then re-elected to a five-year term as National President of CVUC in early 2008.

== Family and personal life ==
Andze's father, Gilbert Andze Tsoungui, was an important minister under President Paul Biya. He died in 2007.
