= 1988 Cameroonian general election =

- 24 April 1988
- Presidential election
- Registered: 3,634,568
- Turnout: 92.56% (▼5.17pp)
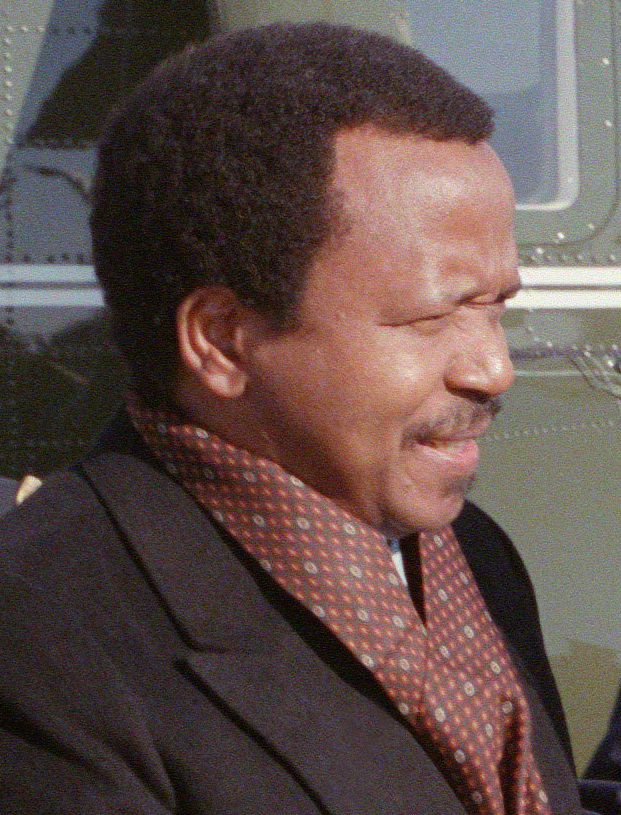
Nominee	Paul Biya
Party	RDPC
Popular vote	3,321,872
Percentage	100%
President before election
Paul Biya
RDPC
Elected President
Paul Biya
RDPC
- Parliamentary election
- All 180 seats in the National Assembly; 90 seats needed for a majority
- Turnout: 90.32% (▼8.88pp)
Party	Leader	Vote %	Seats	+/–
RDPC	Paul Biya	100	180	+60
This lists parties that won seats. See the complete results below.

General elections were held in Cameroon on 24 April 1988 to elect a President and National Assembly. The country was a one-party state at the time, with the Cameroon People's Democratic Movement as the sole legal party. Its leader, incumbent Paul Biya was the only candidate in the presidential election, and was re-elected unopposed.

For the first time since 1960 voters had a choice of candidates in the National Assembly election, with two or more CPDM candidates contesting each constituency, and a total of 324 candidates running for the 180 seats in the enlarged Assembly. Nevertheless, the CPDM won all 180 seats with a 90.3% turnout.

== Results ==
=== President ===
Candidate	Party	Votes	%
Paul Biya	Cameroon People's Democratic Movement	3,321,872	100.00
Total		3,321,872	100.00
Valid votes		3,321,872	98.75
Invalid/blank votes		42,218	1.25
Total votes		3,364,090	100.00
Registered voters/turnout		3,634,568	92.56
Source: Nohlen et al.

=== National Assembly ===
Party	Votes	%	Seats	+/–
Cameroon People's Democratic Movement	3,179,898	100.00	180	+60
Total	3,179,898	100.00	180	+60
Valid votes	3,179,898	96.86		
Invalid/blank votes	102,986	3.14		
Total votes	3,282,884	100.00		
Registered voters/turnout	3,634,568	90.32		
Source: Nohlen et al.
