= Louis-Paul Aujoulat =

French politician (1910–1973)

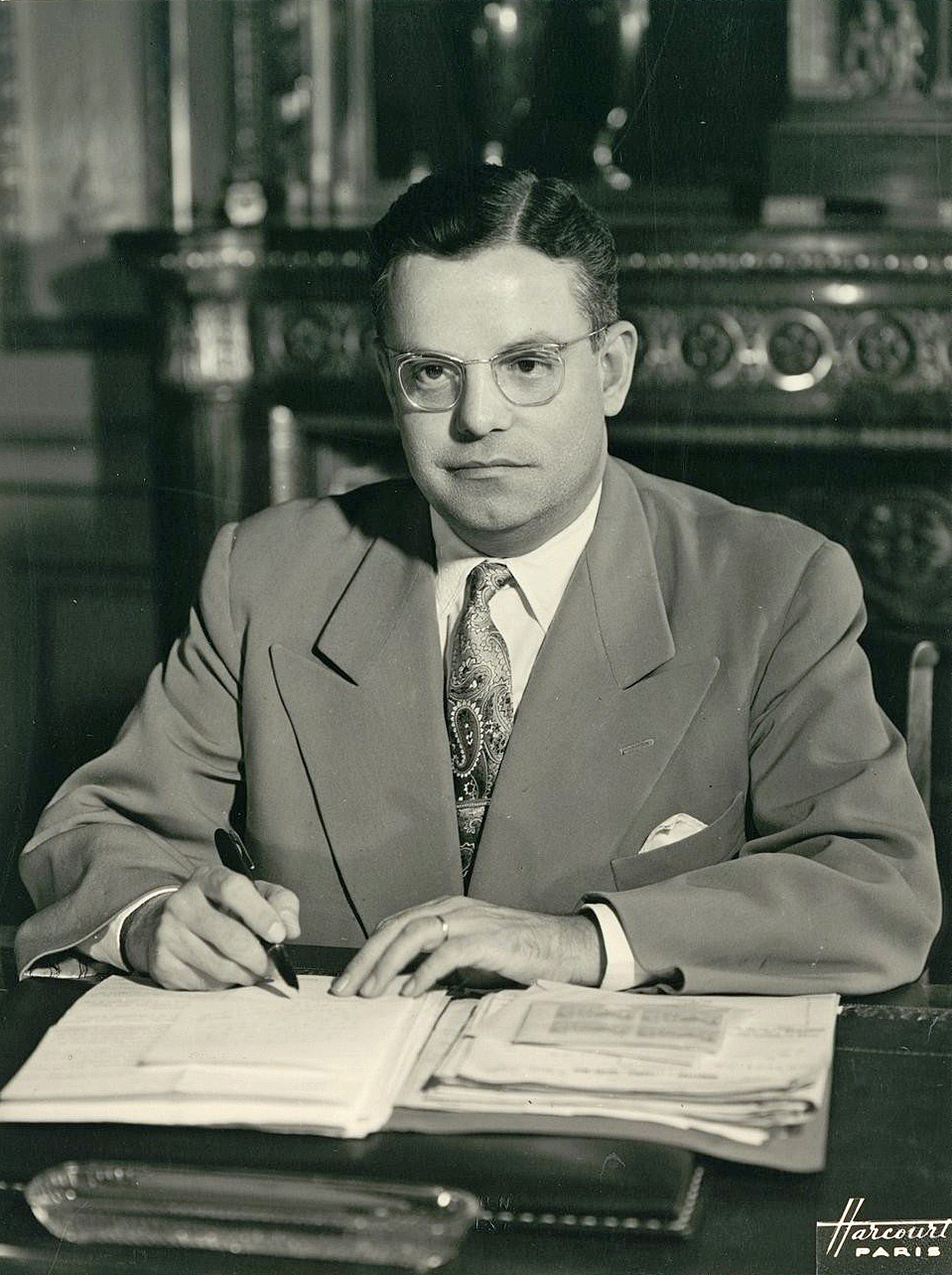
Minister of Public Health and Population

Louis-Paul Aujoulat (28 August 1910 – 1 December 1973) was a French politician and missionary doctor. Following his long and illustrious political career he served as France's representative to the World Health Organization.

== Early life ==
Aujoulat was born on 28 August 1910 in Saïda, Algeria. He completed his secondary education in Sidi Bel Abbès, where his father taught, before being educated at the Catholic University in Lille (North of France) in 1928 to follow the Faculty of Medicine course. In 1934, he completed his thesis, which was named the best in his faculty. With his doctorate of medicine, for the next two years he worked with a physiology professor named Legrand and lectured at the local nursing school.

He was married in 1936, after which he joined the Ad lucem Catholic medical foundation, with whom he founded a hospital in Efok, Cameroon. Aujoulat served as director of the foundation from 1936 to 1945.

== Political career ==
Aujoulat was elected to the French National Assembly from the First College in Cameroon. At the Palais Bourbon, he was appointed Commissioner of overseas territories. Under this post, his most notable achievement was reorganizing the healthcare of the overseas territories. Aujoulat was re-elected in June 1946 and again in November 1946. Besides his other post, he was appointed member of the National Defense Commission.

Aujoulat assisted the UN General Assembly in 1946, as a counselor of the French delegation and intervenes on 13 December to approve trusteeship agreements in Togo and Cameroon. In November 1948, he abandoned the MRP, thus becoming an independent. Aujoulat was appointed Deputy Secretary of State for Overseas France from 29 October 1949 to 17 February 1950, then Secretary of State for Overseas France from 2 to 12 July.

In 1950, Aujoulat chaired the Economic Development Plan and Social Council and its implementing body, the Investment Fund (FIDES). He also led the Catholic Union of International Cooperation (UCCI) and the International Movement for Fraternal Union Among Races and Peoples (UFER). In 1951, he launched his own party, the Cameroonian Democratic Bloc (BDC). He has the support of Prelate René Graffin, who is openly campaigning on his behalf: "All Catholics must, on election day, go to the polls and vote for the good Christian. "However, the BDC will never succeed in developing seriously and competing with the Union of the Peoples of Cameroon.

He was re-elected again in the June 1951 elections, this time contesting a Second College seat. He was also elected to Cameroon's Territorial Assembly, a position he would hold for two years. In Paris, Dr. Aujoulat is appointed to the Board of Justice and Law, the Foreign Affairs Committee and that of industrial production and energy. He was the Minister of Health from 19 June 1954 to 3 September 1954, then Minister of Labor and Social Security until 23 February 1955.

According to the testimonies of some of his collaborators, he was homosexual but had to hide it because of his conservative commitment and religious beliefs.

== Later life ==
Aujoulat ran for re-election in the January 1956 elections, but received only 13% of the vote as he was defeated by André Mbida. After this he abandoned parliamentary life, instead focusing on a career as France's representative to the World Health Organization. He died on 1 December 1973 in Paris.
