= 1978 Cameroonian parliamentary election =

- 28 May 1978
- All 120 seats in the National Assembly; 60 seats needed for a majority
Party	Leader	Vote %	Seats	+/–
UNC	Ahmadou Ahidjo	100	120	0
This lists parties that won seats. See the complete results below.

Parliamentary elections were held in Cameroon on 28 May 1978. The country was a one-party state at the time, with the Cameroonian National Union as the sole legal party. 2,618 candidates ran for a place on the CNU list, with 120 eventually winning a place on it, equal to the number seats available in the National Assembly, winning all of them with a 98% turnout.

== Results ==
Party	Votes	%	Seats	+/–
Cameroonian National Union	3,614,768	100.00	120	0
Total	3,614,768	100.00	120	0
Valid votes	3,614,768	99.98		
Invalid/blank votes	596	0.02		
Total votes	3,615,364	100.00		
Registered voters/turnout	3,663,358	98.69		
Source: Nohlen et al.
