= Simon Pierre Tchoungui =

Cameroonian Prime minister 1965 - 1972

Federal Minister of Public Health
- In office 20 October 1961 – 30 June 1964

Federal Minister of National Economy
- In office 1 July 1964 – 24 May 1965

Federal Minister of Public Health
- In office 25 May 1965 – 19 November 1965

4th Prime Minister of Cameroon
- In office 20 November 1965 – 2 June 1972
- President: Ahmadou Ahidjo
- Preceded by: Vincent de Paul Ahanda
- Succeeded by: Paul Biya

Personal details
- Born: 28 October 1916 Nkolmending, Mefou Division, Center Province
- Died: 23 July 1997 (aged 80)
- Citizenship: Cameroonian
- Education: University of Paris
- Profession: Doctor

Simon Pierre Tchoungui (28 October 1916 – 23 July 1997) was a medical doctor who was appointed Prime Minister of East Cameroon from October 1965 until 20 May 1972, when the United Republic of Cameroon came into being.

== Early years ==
Simon Pierre Tchoungui was born in Nkolmending, Mefou Division, Center Province of Cameroon on 28 October 1916. He belonged to the Ewondo / Bulu group collectively known as the Beti people. He attended the Ayos school for health assistants, founded in 1932 by Eugène Jamot. After his schooling he worked as a medical assistant in Yaoundé and Mbalmayo. During World War II he enrolled as a soldier in the Free French Forces from 1942 to 1945. He then studied at Dakar Medical School, qualifying as a surgeon to 1947, when he returned to Cameroon. He studied at the University of Paris from 1950 to 1956, gaining a PhD in Medicine. In 1960 Tchoungui was medical superintendent of Yaoundé Central Hospital.

== Political positions ==
Tchoungui was appointed Minister of Public Health when a new federal cabinet was announced on 20 October 1961. After federal legislative elections, on 1 July 1964 the cabinet was reshuffled. Tchoungui was appointed Minister of National Economy. In 1965 he was briefly Minister without portfolio. On 18 November 1965, East Cameroon Prime Minister Vincent de Paul Ahanda was dismissed from office due to a dispute with President Ahmadou Ahidjo. Tchoungui was named his successor, and would remain head of the East Cameroon government until May 1972. Ahidjo, who was from the Hausa–Fulani north of the country, made a practice of appointing Beti Prime Ministers from the center/south to maintain balance.

In June 1966 President Ahidjo called a conference that included the leaders of the two main political parties, the KNDP and CPNC and the prime ministers of West and East Cameroon. The participants decided to "reinforce national unity" by merging their parties into one, the Cameroon National Union (In French: Union Nationale Camerounaise - UNC). The new party came into legal existence on 1 September 1966, with Ahidjo as president and Tchoungui one of two vice-presidents. Elections were held for the Federal and East Cameroon governments on 7 June 1970 and were won by the UNC candidates, as expected. On 12 June 1970 Tchoungui was reappointed Prime Minister of Eastern Cameroun. He left this post on 20 May 1972 when the United Republic of Cameroon was declared.

Tchoungui, a Catholic, played a role in the affair of Bishop Albert Ndongmo. Ndongmo was credibly suspected of being involved with rebels led by Ernest Ouandié. The Archbishop of Yaoundé, Jean Zoa, requested that Tchoungui ask the Pope to summon Ndongmo to Rome and then invite him to remain there. Ndongmo, who insisted on his innocence, did go to Rome but then returned to face trial. He was arrested immediately after arriving, and after several months of interrogation faced a military tribunal in January 1971, which sentenced him to death for treason. Ahidjo later commuted the sentence to life imprisonment. The affair caused tension between Muslims and Christians: some churches were burned in the North. It also caused dissension among Catholics, some of whom condemned Archbishop Zoa for being too close to the government, and for possibly assisting in removal of a popular rival.

== Other activities ==
Tchoungui was elected first president of the Cameroon Red Cross Society on 30 April 1960, an honorary position. Tchoungui remained a prominent member of the UNC. On 24 March 1984 the UNC became the Cameroon People's Democratic Movement (In French, Rassemblement démocratique du Peuple Camerounais - RDPC). Tchoungui was a member of the RDPC central committee.

Simon Pierre Tchoungui died on 23 July 1997 aged 80.
