= 1975 Cameroonian presidential election =

Second re-election of Ahmadou Ahidjo

- 5 April 1975
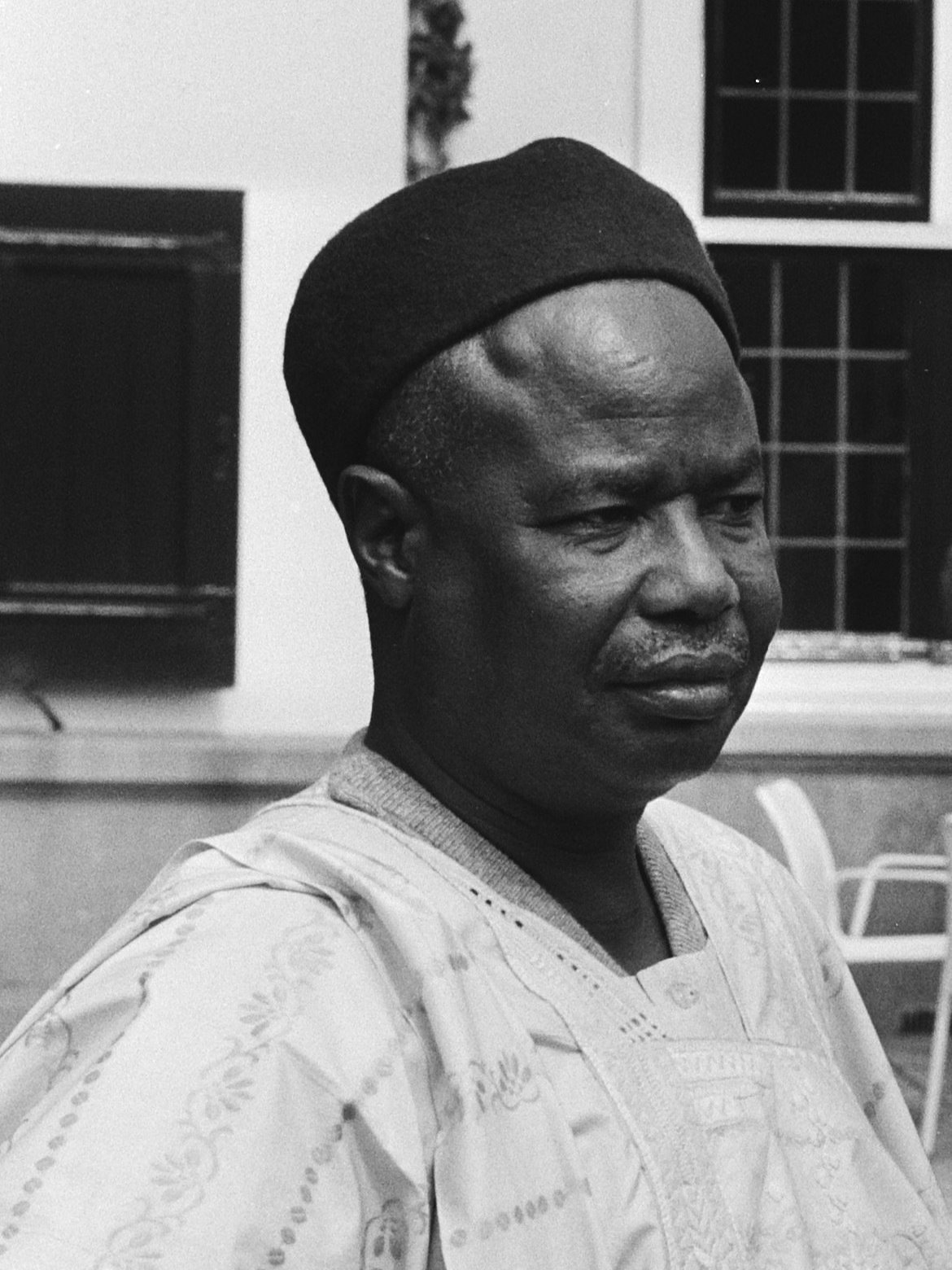
Nominee	Ahmadou Ahidjo
Party	UNC
Popular vote	3,483,165
Percentage	100%
President before election
Ahmadou Ahidjo
UNC
Elected President
Ahmadou Ahidjo
UNC

Presidential elections were held in Cameroon on 5 April 1975. The country was a one-party state at the time, with the Cameroonian National Union as the sole legal party. Its leader, Ahmadou Ahidjo, was the only candidate in the election, and won unopposed.

== Results ==
Candidate	Party	Votes	%
Ahmadou Ahidjo	Cameroonian National Union	3,483,165	100.00
Total		3,483,165	100.00
Valid votes		3,483,165	100.00
Invalid/blank votes		163	0.00
Total votes		3,483,328	100.00
Registered voters/turnout		3,502,640	99.45
Source: African Elections Database
