= 1970 Cameroonian presidential election =

First re-election of Ahmadou Ahidjo

- 28 March 1970
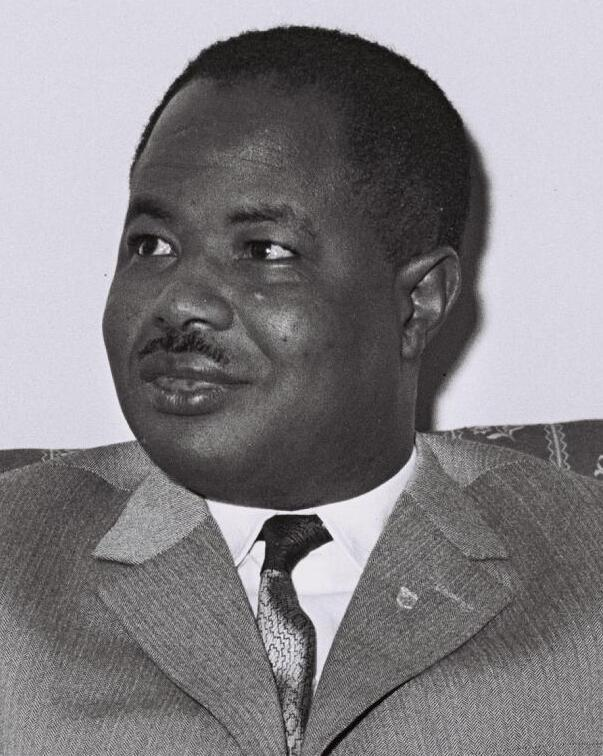
Nominee	Ahmadou Ahidjo
Party	UNC
Popular vote	3,478,942
Percentage	100%
President before election
Ahmadou Ahidjo
UNC
Elected President
Ahmadou Ahidjo
UNC

Presidential elections were held in Cameroon on 28 March 1970. The country was a one-party state at the time, with the Cameroonian National Union as the sole legal party. Its leader, Ahmadou Ahidjo, was the only candidate in the election, and won unopposed. Voter turnout was 99%.

== Results ==
Candidate	Party	Votes	%
Ahmadou Ahidjo	Cameroonian National Union	3,478,942	100.00
Total		3,478,942	100.00
Valid votes		3,478,942	99.99
Invalid/blank votes		244	0.01
Total votes		3,479,186	100.00
Registered voters/turnout		3,501,177	99.37
Source: Nohlen et al.
