= 1980 Cameroonian presidential election =

Third re-election of Ahmadou Ahidjo

- 5 April 1980
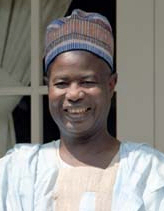
Nominee	Ahmadou Ahidjo
Party	UNC
Popular vote	3,329,145
Percentage	100%
President before election
Ahmadou Ahidjo
UNC
Elected President
Ahmadou Ahidjo
UNC

Presidential elections were held in Cameroon on 5 April 1980. The country was a one-party state at the time, with the Cameroonian National Union as the sole legal party. Its leader, Ahmadou Ahidjo, was the only candidate in the election, and won unopposed. Voter turnout was 99%.

== Results ==
Candidate	Party	Votes	%
Ahmadou Ahidjo	Cameroonian National Union	3,329,145	100.00
Total		3,329,145	100.00
Valid votes		3,329,145	100.00
Invalid/blank votes		90	0.00
Total votes		3,329,235	100.00
Registered voters/turnout		3,361,630	99.04
Source: Nohlen et al.
