= Gérard Jaquet =

French politician (1916–2013)

Gérard Jaquet (French: [ʒeʁaʁ ʒakɛ]; 12 January 1916 – 13 April 2013) was a French politician.

Jaquet was born in Malakoff. He represented the French Section of the Workers' International (SFIO) in the Constituent Assembly elected in 1945, in the Constituent Assembly elected in 1946 and in the National Assembly from 1946 to 1958. He was Minister of Overseas France from 1957 to 1958.
