= 1960 Cameroonian constitutional referendum =

- 21 February 1960

Results
| Choice | Votes | % |
|---|---|---|
| Yes | 797,498 | 60.03% |
| No | 531,075 | 39.97% |
| Valid votes | 1,328,573 | 99.28% |
| Invalid or blank votes | 9,605 | 0.72% |
| Total votes | 1,338,178 | 100.00% |
| Registered voters/turnout | 1,771,969 | 75.52% |

A constitutional referendum was held in Cameroon on 21 February 1960. The new constitution would make the country a federal presidential republic with a unicameral federal parliament. It was passed by 60% of voters with a 75.5% turnout.

== Results ==
| Choice | Votes | % |
|---|---|---|
| For | 797,498 | 60.03 |
| Against | 531,075 | 39.97 |
| Invalid/blank votes | 9,605 | – |
| Total | 1,338,178 | 100 |
| Registered voters/turnout | 1,771,969 | 75.5 |
Source: African Elections Database
