= East Cameroon =

East Cameroon Cameroun oriental
- State of the Federal Republic of Cameroon
- 1961–1972
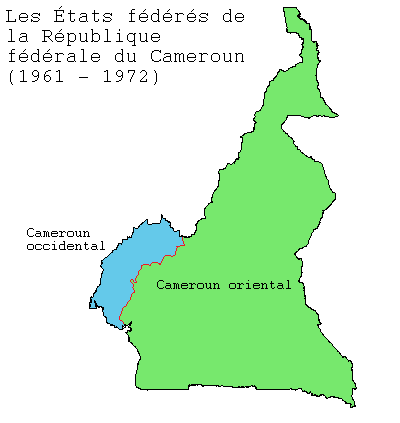
- East Cameroon (green) within the Federal Republic of Cameroon
- Capital: Yaoundé
  - Type: Federated state
- History
  - Established: 1 October 1961
  - Disestablished: 2 June 1972
Preceded by	Succeeded by
Republic of Cameroon (1960–1961)	United Republic of Cameroon
- Today part of: Cameroon

East Cameroon (French: Cameroun oriental) was a federated state within the Federal Republic of Cameroon that existed between 1961 and 1972. It was formed on 1 October 1961 when the independent Republic of Cameroon was federated with the formerly British-administered Southern Cameroons to form the Federal Republic of Cameroon and abolished on 2 June 1972 when Cameroon became a unitary state.

== History ==
The German Empire established the Kamerun protectorate in August 1884. At the conclusion of the First World War, the Treaty of Versailles divided German Kamerun between France and the United Kingdom, with what would become East Cameroon becoming French Cameroon.

French Cameroon became independent as the Republic of Cameroon on 1 January 1960. Voters in neighbouring British administered Southern Cameroons were asked in a referendum held in 1961 whether they wished to join either Nigeria or Cameroon. With a majority opting to join Cameroon, the British administered Southern Cameroons was federated with the Republic of Cameroon, to form the Federal Republic of Cameroon on 1 October 1961.

Following a referendum held on 20 May 1972, a new constitution came to effect on 2 June 1972, which reconstituted Cameroon as a unitary state with the federated state of East Cameroon being abolished.

== Governance ==
The constitution of East Cameroon gave the region its own legislature and regional government led by a prime minister. The federal constitution gave the institutions of East Cameroon executive and legislative competence in all areas not specifically reserved for the federal government.

=== Executive ===
Executive authority was vested in an Executive Council made up of the Prime Minister and other Secretaries of State.

Prime ministers

No.	Portrait	Name (Birth–Death)	Election	Term of office			Political party	President
No.	Portrait	Name (Birth–Death)	Election	Took office	Left office	Time in office	Political party	President
Prime Minister of East Cameroon
		Charles Assalé (1911–1999)	1964	1 October 1961	19 June 1965	3 years, 261 days	UC	Ahmadou Ahidjo
		Vincent de Paul Ahanda (1918–1975)	—	19 June 1965	20 November 1965	154 days	UC	Ahmadou Ahidjo
		Simon Pierre Tchoungui (1916–1997)	—	20 November 1965	2 June 1972	6 years, 195 days	UC (until 1966)	Ahmadou Ahidjo
		Simon Pierre Tchoungui (1916–1997)	—	20 November 1965	2 June 1972	6 years, 195 days	UNC	Ahmadou Ahidjo

=== Legislature ===
East Cameroon had a 100-member unicameral Legislative Assembly.

President of the Legislative Assembly of East Cameroon

Name	Entered office	Left office
Louis Kemayou	1961	1970
Sanda Oumarou	1970	1972

== See also ==
- West Cameroon
