= Independent Peasants =

The Independent Peasants (French: Paysans Indépendants, PI) were a political party in French Cameroons.

== History ==
The party contested the 1956 Territorial Assembly elections. It received 9.6% of the vote, winning 8 of the 70 seats.
