= 1983 Cameroonian parliamentary election =

- 29 May 1983
- All 120 seats in the National Assembly; 60 seats needed for a majority
Party	Leader	Vote %	Seats	+/–
UNC	Paul Biya	100	120	0
This lists parties that won seats. See the complete results below.

Parliamentary elections were held in Cameroon on 29 May 1983. The country was a one-party state at the time, with the Cameroonian National Union as the sole legal party. 2,600 candidates ran for a place on the CNU list, with 120 eventually winning a place on it, equal to the number seats available in the National Assembly. The party won all seats with a 99% turnout.

== Results ==
Party	Votes	%	Seats	+/–
Cameroonian National Union	3,628,469	100.00	120	0
Total	3,628,469	100.00	120	0
Valid votes	3,628,469	100.00		
Invalid/blank votes	110	0.00		
Total votes	3,628,579	100.00		
Registered voters/turnout	3,657,995	99.20		
Source: Inter-Parliamentary Union
