= 1960 Cameroonian parliamentary election =

Parliamentary elections were held in Cameroon on 10 April 1960. They were the first elections held in accordance with the new constitution, approved in a referendum in February, which created a unicameral federal National Assembly. The result was a slim victory for the Cameroonian Union, forcing it to govern in coalition. However, the elections were marred by severe irregularities.

== Results ==
Julienne Keutcha was the only woman elected, becoming the first directly elected female member of the Cameroonian parliament.

Party	Votes	%	Seats	+/–
Cameroonian Union	606,000	44.91	51	+21
Union of the Peoples of Cameroon	151,379	11.22	8	New
People's Front for Unity and Peace	145,752	10.80	19	New
Cameroonian Party of Democrats	139,780	10.36	12	–8
Group of Cameroonian Progressives	60,686	4.50	7	–1
Other parties	233,789	17.33	0	–
Independents	11,853	0.88	3	New
Total	1,349,239	100.00	100	+30
Registered voters/turnout	1,940,438	–		
Source: Nohlen et al.
