= 1984 Cameroonian presidential election =

Election of Paul Biya

- 14 January 1984
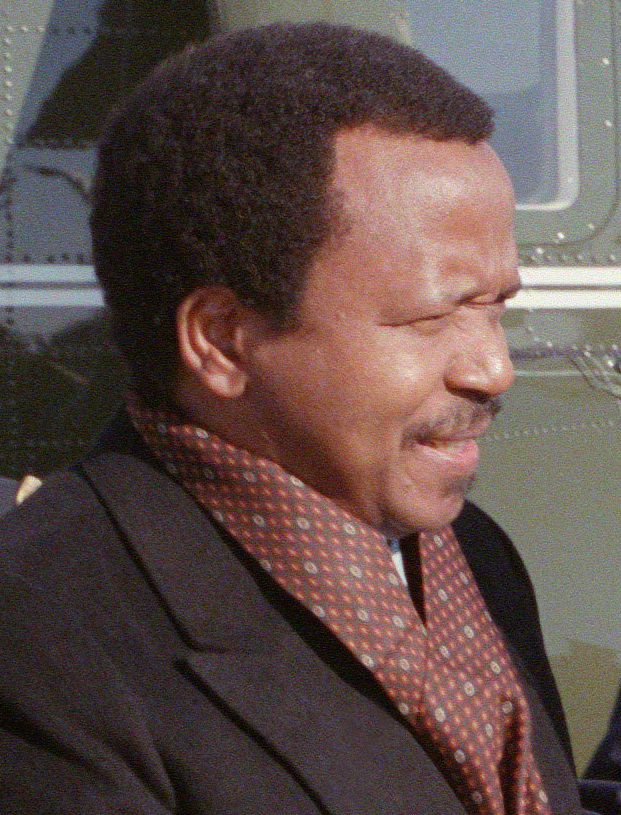
| Nominee | Paul Biya |
| Party | UNC |
| Popular vote | 3,878,138 |
| Percentage | 100% |
President before election
Paul Biya
UNC
Elected President
Paul Biya
UNC

Presidential elections were held in Cameroon on 14 January 1984. The country was a one-party state at the time, with the Cameroonian National Union as the sole legal party. Its leader, Paul Biya, was the only candidate in the election, and won unopposed. Voter turnout was 98%.

== Results ==
| Candidate | Party | Votes | % |
|---|---|---|---|
| Paul Biya | Cameroonian National Union | 3,878,138 | 100.00 |
| Total | | 3,878,138 | 100.00 |
| Valid votes | | 3,878,138 | 99.98 |
| Invalid/blank votes | | 607 | 0.02 |
| Total votes | | 3,878,745 | 100.00 |
| Registered voters/turnout | | 3,968,673 | 97.73 |
Source: Nohlen et al.
