= Jules Ninine =

Guadeloupean politician

Jules Ninine (born October 8, 1903, in Pointe-a-Pitre, Guadeloupe and died April 26, 1969, in Paris) was a politician from Guadeloupe who served and represented Cameroon in the French National Assembly from 1946 to 1958.

He served as the President of the Legislative Assembly of Cameroon from May 1957 to October 1958.

== Bibliography ==
- 1st page on the French National Assembly website
- 2nd page on the French National Assembly website
