= Vincent de Paul Ahanda =

Cameroonian politician

Vincent de Paul Ahanda (24 June 1918 – 12 September 1975) was the prime minister of East Cameroon in the Federal Republic of Cameroon from 19 June 1965 to 20 November 1965.
