= Alexandre Douala Manga Bell =

French politician (1897 - 1966)

Alexandre Douala Manga Bell (3 December 1897 – 19 September 1966 in Douala) was head of the Duala people in Cameroon, German officer and French politician.

== Biography ==
=== Youth in Germany ===
Alexandre Douala Manga Bell - then named Alexander Duala Manga Bell - was born on 3 December 1897 in the Douala area as the eldest son of King Rudolf Duala Manga Bell. Cameroon was a German colony at that time. At the age of four Alexander was brought to Germany for education. In the First World War, in 1915, he fought against the British and the French as a German officer at Gallipoli in Turkey, which was allied with Germany. One year before in Cameroon, his father, Rudolf Manga Bell, had been executed after a conflict with the German colonial administration on charges of high treason.

In 1919, in Hamburg Alexander Douala-Bell married Andrea Jimenez Berroa. She was the daughter of the Afro-Cuban pianist Jose Manuel Jimenez Berroa, professor at the Hamburg Music Conservatory, and Emma Mina Filter, descendant of a long established Hamburg family. They had two children, son Jose Emmanuel, born 1920, and daughter Andrea Tüke Ekedi, born 1921.

=== Life in France and Cameroon ===
Cameroon became French in 1919 according to the Treaty of Versailles. The French government now forced the moving of Alexandre Douala-Bell to France, expecting this would give a benefit to the legitimacy of the new French rule in Cameroon. On the other hand, the French government distrusted him because of his German background and insisted on "frenchifying" him before returning to Cameroon. In mid-1919, the couple moved to Paris. After some temporary stays, Alexandre Douala-Bell returned to Cameroon in 1922, but without his wife Andrea Manga Bell and the children who remained in Europe. In the following years, he had to fight for his position in Cameroon, as well as for his family property, for which was he was engaged in an 18-year-long lawsuit.

During the Second World War, Alexandre Douala-Bell fought on the side of France and enlisted in Dakar with the French army. In the post-war period, all French colonial territories could send MPs to Paris. Alexandre Douala-Bell was elected to the Constituent Assembly of the Fourth Republic in 1945 as one of the representatives of Cameroon. In the parliamentary elections of 1946, he scored almost a two-thirds majority. In 1951 and 1956, he was re-elected. From 1946 to 1955, he was a member of the MRP (Mouvement républicain populaire). In his last legislative period from 1956 until his retirement in 1958, he was one of the "Indépendants d'outre-mer". In 1952, he was a delegate of France at the UN General Assembly. He was also a member of the Territorial Assembly of Cameroon since 1952.

=== Death of the son ===
During a visit by his son Emmanuel in Douala, Alexandre shot him in a dispute on 15 September 1947. Alexandre was imprisoned, but released soon after on 19 November 1947. The death of his son was classified as an accident, and the French Parliament rejected the waiver of immunity. Efforts by Andrea Manga Bell, to achieve a trial despite this, were unsuccessful.

It was not until 1951 that Alexandre Douala-Bell was enthroned as head of the Douala (chef supérieure). On 19 September 1966, Alexandre Douala Bell died. His successor as head of Douala was his nephew René Douala Manga Bell.
