= Charles Assalé =

Prime Minister of Cameroon

Prime Minister of Cameroon
- In office 1 January 1960 – 1961

Prime Minister of East Cameroon
- In office 15 May 1961 – 19 June 1965

Personal details
- Born: 4 November 1911 South Province, Cameroon
- Died: 10 December 1999 (aged 88) Yaoundé, Cameroon
- Occupation: Politician

Charles Assalé (4 November 1911 in South Province – 10 December 1999 in Yaoundé) was a Cameroonian politician and the founder of the Union of the Peoples of Cameroon on April 10th 1948. He served as the Prime Minister of the Republic of Cameroon from January 1st 1960 to 1961 and the first Prime Minister of the federated state of East Cameroon from 15 May 1961 to 19 June 1965. He fell from power and was succeeded by former Prime Minister of Cameroon, Vincent de Paul Ahanda.

Political offices
Preceded by Ahmadou Ahidjo	Prime Minister of Cameroon; 1960–1965	Succeeded by Vincent de Paul Ahanda
