= Cameroonian Union =

Cameroonian Union Union camérounaise
- Abbreviation: UC
- Founder: Ahmadou Ahidjo
- Founded: 1958
- Dissolved: 1966
- Split from: Cameroonian Democratic Bloc
- Merged into: Cameroonian National Union
- Colors: Green

The Cameroonian Union (French: Union camérounaise or UC) was a Cameroonian pro-independence party active in the French territory of Cameroun.

The UC was formed by Ahmadou Ahidjo in 1958 when he broke from André-Marie Mbida and the Cameroonian Democratic Bloc (BDC). Under Ahidjo, the UC was prepared to work with the French in order to achieve its goals of a united, independent Cameroon.

Formed from an alliance in the legislature between political figures from the centre and south of the country and magnates from the Islamic Fula people the UC emerged as the main party post-independence. The party had initially only won a slim majority in the election immediately after independence and was forced to govern by coalition. However, by 1963 the UC had absorbed its coalition partners and was very much the dominant party. Indeed, in the 1964 parliamentary elections the UC captured 98% of the vote in East Cameroon whilst in the 1965 Presidential election Ahidjo captured 99.95% of the vote as a joint UC-Kamerun National Democratic Party (KNDP) candidate. The party dominated politics in Francophone Cameroon until in 1966 when it merged with the KNDP to become the Cameroonian National Union, the single party of government.
