= Cameroon People's Democratic Movement =

Political party in Cameroon

Cameroon People's Democratic Movement Rassemblement démocratique du Peuple Camerounais
- President: Paul Biya
- Secretary-General: Jean Nkuete
- Founded: 24 March 1985 (41 years, 159 days)
- Preceded by: Cameroonian National Union
- Headquarters: Yaoundé
- Ideology: Nationalism; Populism; Social conservatism Economic liberalism Communitarian liberalism Francophilia; Authoritarianism
- Political position: Big tent
- Senate: 94 / 100
- National Assembly: 152 / 180

Website
- rdpcpdm.cm (in French)

The Cameroon People's Democratic Movement (CPDM; French: Rassemblement démocratique du Peuple Camerounais, RDPC) is the ruling political party in Cameroon. Previously known as the Cameroonian National Union, which had dominated Cameroon politics since independence in the 1960s, it was renamed in 1985. The national president of the CPDM is Paul Biya, the president of Cameroon, while the secretary-general of the party's Central Committee is Jean Nkuete.

== History ==
=== Cameroonian National Union ===
Cameroonian National Union Union nationale camérounaise
- Founder: Ahmadou Ahidjo
- Founded: 1 September 1966 (59 years, 363 days)
- Dissolved: 24 March 1985 (41 years, 159 days)
- Merger of: Cameroonian Union; Kamerun National Democratic Party
- Succeeded by: Cameroon People's Democratic Movement
- Headquarters: Yaoundé, Cameroon
- Ideology: 1966–1982: African nationalism Planned liberalism 1982–1985: Privatization
- Colors: Green

The Cameroonian National Union (CNU; French: Union nationale camérounaise, UNC) was formed in 1966 through a merger of the Cameroon Union (Union Camerounaise) and the Kamerun National Democratic Party, the major political organizations, respectively, of the state of west Cameroon and the state of east Cameroon, and four smaller parties. For the next quarter-century, the UNC/RDPC and the government were effectively one. The UNC sponsored labor, youth, and women's organizations and provided the only list of candidates for the 1973, 1978, and 1983 legislative elections.

Ahmadou Ahidjo became the first head of the UNC in 1966 and continued in that capacity after his resignation as the nation's president in 1982. Following President Paul Biya's assumption of emergency powers in August 1983, Ahidjo, then in France, resigned as party leader. Biya was subsequently elected party chief at a special party congress in September.

=== CPDM ===
In 1985, the UNC was renamed the Cameroon People's Democratic Movement (CPDM or Rassemblement Démocratique du Peuple Camerounais—RDPC). Opposition parties were legalized in 1990.

The CPDM won 88 of the 180 seats in the National Assembly of Cameroon in the March 1992 parliamentary election, and through an alliance with the Movement for the Defense of the Republic (MDR), which won six seats, it obtained a parliamentary majority. Biya subsequently won the October 1992 presidential election with about 40% of the vote, ahead of John Fru Ndi of the Social Democratic Front (SDF), who won about 36%. The CPDM gained 116 of the 180 seats in the May 1997 parliamentary election (it initially won 109 seats, but it subsequently won in the three constituencies where the election was held over again in August, gaining seven more seats) and in the October 1997 presidential election, Biya received 92.6% of the vote amidst an opposition boycott.

==== Political opposition and alliances in 2000 ====
The SDF and its allies in the Union for Change remain critical of Biya but are also critical of France, which they call an "accomplice of those in power." However, in 2000 the alliance reportedly was falling apart as the SDF sought to distance itself from the Southern Cameroon National Council (SCNC). The SCNC apparently was accusing the SDF of delaying independence for the northwest and southwest English-speaking provinces by refusing to force its English-speaking members of parliament to resign from the Francophone-dominated National Assembly. Moreover, some members of the opposition wanted their party leaders to join Biya's coalition government so they could share the spoils of office.

By 2000, Biya had shored up his government by forming a coalition with the northern-based UNDP, which had 13 Assembly seats, and with the UPC, which had one seat. Together, the ruling coalition gave Biya a four-fifth's majority in the Assembly. The coalition government enjoyed support from seven of Cameroon's 10 provinces, and thus secured former president Ahidjo's north–south alliance, which he had created in 1958.

==== From 2002 ====
In the parliamentary election held on 30 June 2002, the party won 149 out of 180 seats, including 16 seats won in a revote on 15 September for constituencies where the election had been invalidated. In the presidential election held on 11 October 2004, Biya won 70.9% of the vote.

The CPDM won 140 out of the 163 initially declared seats in the July 2007 parliamentary election, and it won another 13 seats (out of 17 at stake) in constituencies where the vote was held over again in September, thus winning a total of 153 seats.

== Congresses ==
The party held its first ordinary congress, at which Biya told the party to prepare for competition as the move toward multiparty democracy was beginning, on June 28, 1990, in Yaoundé. The CPDM's first extraordinary congress was held in Yaoundé on October 7, 1995, and its second ordinary congress was held on December 17–19, 1996. The party held its second extraordinary congress on July 7, 2001 and its third extraordinary congress on July 21, 2006, in Yaoundé. Biya has been consistently re-elected as the CPDM's National President.

== Election results ==
=== Presidential elections ===
Election	Party candidate	Votes	%	Result
1970	Ahmadou Ahidjo	3,478,942	100%	Elected ✓
1975	Ahmadou Ahidjo	3,483,165	100%	Elected ✓
1980	Ahmadou Ahidjo	3,329,145	100%	Elected ✓
1984	Paul Biya	3,878,138	100%	Elected ✓
1988	Paul Biya	3,321,872	100%	Elected ✓
1992	Paul Biya	1,185,466	39.98%	Elected ✓
1997	Paul Biya	3,167,820	92.57%	Elected ✓
2004	Paul Biya	2,665,359	70.92%	Elected ✓
2011	Paul Biya	3,772,527	77.99%	Elected ✓
2018	Paul Biya	2,521,934	71.28%	Elected ✓
2025	Paul Biya	2,474,179	53.66%	Elected ✓

=== National Assembly elections ===
Election	Party leader	Votes	%	Seats	+/–	Position	Result
1970	Ahmadou Ahidjo	2,926,224	100%	50 / 50	▲50	▲1st	Sole legal party
1973	Ahmadou Ahidjo	3,293,428	100%	120 / 120	▲70	1st	Sole legal party
1978	Ahmadou Ahidjo	3,614,768	100%	120 / 120	Steady	1st	Sole legal party
1983	Paul Biya	3,628,469	100%	120 / 120	Steady	1st	Sole legal party
1988	Paul Biya	3,179,898	100%	180 / 180	▲70	1st	Sole legal party
1992	Paul Biya	989,044	45.5%	88 / 180	▼92	1st	Minority government
1997	Paul Biya	1,399,751	48.0%	109 / 180	▲21	1st	Majority government
2002	Paul Biya			149 / 180	▲40	1st	Supermajority government
2007	Paul Biya	2,105,503	67.30%	153 / 180	▲4	1st	Supermajority government
2013	Paul Biya	2,555,689	63.52%	148 / 180	▼5	1st	Supermajority government
2020	Paul Biya			139 / 180	▼9	1st	Supermajority government

== See also ==
- Emile Andze Andze
- Ephraim Fombi
- Fon Angwafo III of Mankon
- Françoise Foning

== Bibliography ==
- DeLancey, Mark W.; DeLancey, Mark D. (2000). Historical Dictionary of the Republic of Cameroon (3rd ed.). Lanham, Maryland: The Scarecrow Press. ISBN 978-0-8108-3775-1.
- "Cameroon - Political parties". The Encyclopedia of Nations. Advameg, Inc. 2011.
