= Ahmadou Ahidjo =

President of Cameroon from 1960 to 1982

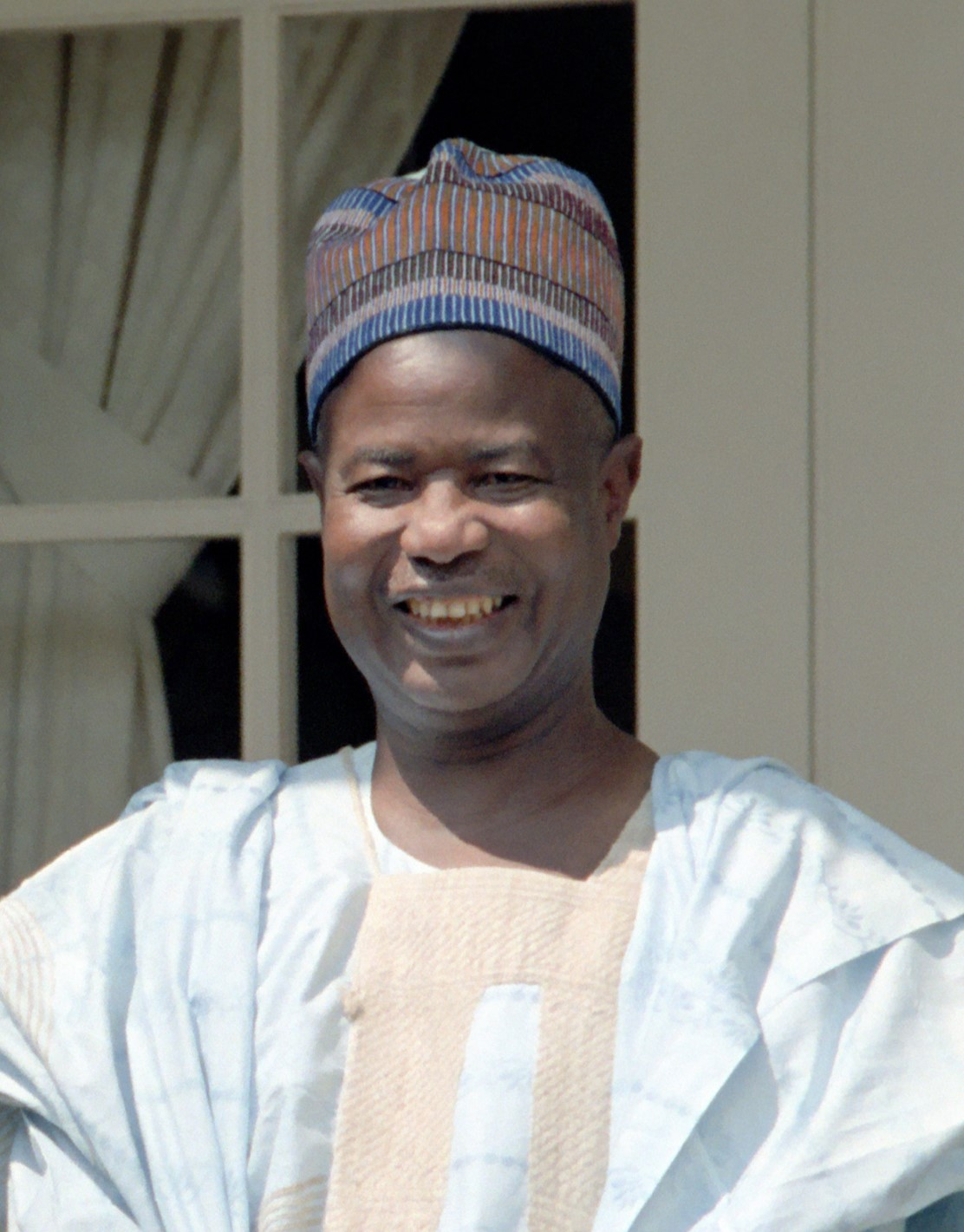
- Ahidjo in 1982

1st President of Cameroon
- In office 5 May 1960 – 6 November 1982
- Prime Minister: Charles Assalé; Vincent de Paul Ahanda; Simon Pierre Tchoungui; Paul Biya
- Vice President: John Ngu Foncha (1961–1970); Salomon Tandeng Muna (1970–1972)
- Preceded by: Office established
- Succeeded by: Paul Biya

1st Prime Minister of Cameroon
- In office 1 January 1960 – 15 May 1960
- President: Himself
- Preceded by: Office established
- Succeeded by: Charles Assalé

Personal details
- Born: 24 August 1924 Garoua, French Cameroon
- Died: 30 November 1989 (aged 65) Dakar, Senegal
- Party: CU (1958–1966); CNU (1966–1985)
- Spouse: Germaine Ahidjo
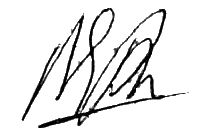
- Signature

Ahmadou Babatoura Ahidjo (24 August 1924 – 30 November 1989) was a Cameroonian politician who was the first president of Cameroon from 1960 until 1982. He was previously the first Prime Minister from the country's independence in January 1960 until May of that same year following the creation of the presidency.

Ahidjo played a major role in the establishment of Cameroon as an independent state in 1960 as well as integrating the French and English-speaking parts of the country. During Ahidjo's time in office, he established a centralised political system. In foreign affairs, Ahidjo pursued a pro-France policy, and benefitted from French support when defeating the pro-communist rebellion of the Union des Populations du Cameroun (UPC) in 1970.

Ahidjo established a single-party state under the Cameroon National Union (CNU) in 1966. In 1972, Ahidjo abolished the federation in favor of a unitary state. Ahidjo resigned from the presidency in 1982, and Paul Biya assumed the presidency. This was an action that was surprising to Cameroonians.

Accused of being behind a coup plot against Biya in 1984, Ahidjo was sentenced to death in absentia, but he died of natural causes in 1989 whilst in exile in Dakar, Senegal.

== Early life ==
Ahidjo was born in Garoua, a major river port along the Benue River in northern Cameroon, which was at the time a French mandate territory. His mother was a Fulani of slave descent, while his father was a Fulani village chief.

Ahidjo's mother raised him as a Muslim and sent him to Quranic kuttab school as a child. In 1932, he began attending local government primary school. After failing his first school certification examination in 1938, Ahidjo worked for a few months in the veterinary service. He returned to school and obtained his school certification a year later. Ahidjo spent the next three years attending secondary school at the Ecole Primaire Supérieur in Yaoundé, the capital of the mandate, studying for a career in the civil service. His classmates are, among others, Félix Sabbal-Lecco, Minister under his government, Abel Moumé Etia, first Cameroonian meteorological engineer and writer, as well as Jean-Faustin Betayéné, Minister of Foreign Affairs of Federal Cameroon. At school, Ahidjo also played soccer and competed as a cyclist.

In 1942, Ahidjo joined the civil service as a radio operator for a postal service. As part of his job, he worked on assignments in several major cities throughout the country, such as Douala, Ngaoundéré, Bertoua, and Mokolo. According to his official biographer, Ahidjo was the first civil servant from northern Cameroun to work in the southern areas of the territory. His experiences throughout the country were, according to Harvey Glickman, professor emeritus of political science at Haverford College and scholar of African politics, responsible for fostering his sense of national identity and provided him the sagacity to handle the problems of governing a multiethnic state.

== Political career ==
In 1946, Ahidjo entered territorial politics. From 1953 to 1957, Ahidjo was a member of the Assembly of the French Union. From 28 January 1957, to 10 May 1957, Ahidjo served as President of the Legislative Assembly of Cameroon. In the same year he became Deputy Prime Minister in de facto head of state André-Marie Mbida's government. In February 1958, Ahidjo became Prime Minister at the age of thirty-four after Mbida resigned. He was reassuring towards the Church and the Muslim aristocracies in the north of the country and succeeded in embodying the union of conservative currents concerned about the growing number of protest movements in the 1950s. While serving as Prime Minister, Ahidjo had administrative goals to move toward independence for Cameroon while reuniting the separated factions of the country and cooperating with French colonial powers. On 12 June, with a motion from the National Assembly, Ahidjo became involved in negotiations with France in Paris. These negotiations continued through October, resulting in formal recognition of Cameroonian plans for independence. The date for the simultaneous termination of French trusteeship and Cameroonian independence was set by Cameroon's National Assembly for 1 January 1960. During and immediately after Cameroon was decolonized, Ahidjo recruited follow northern, Muslim Fulani and Peuhl into the army and an elite guard.

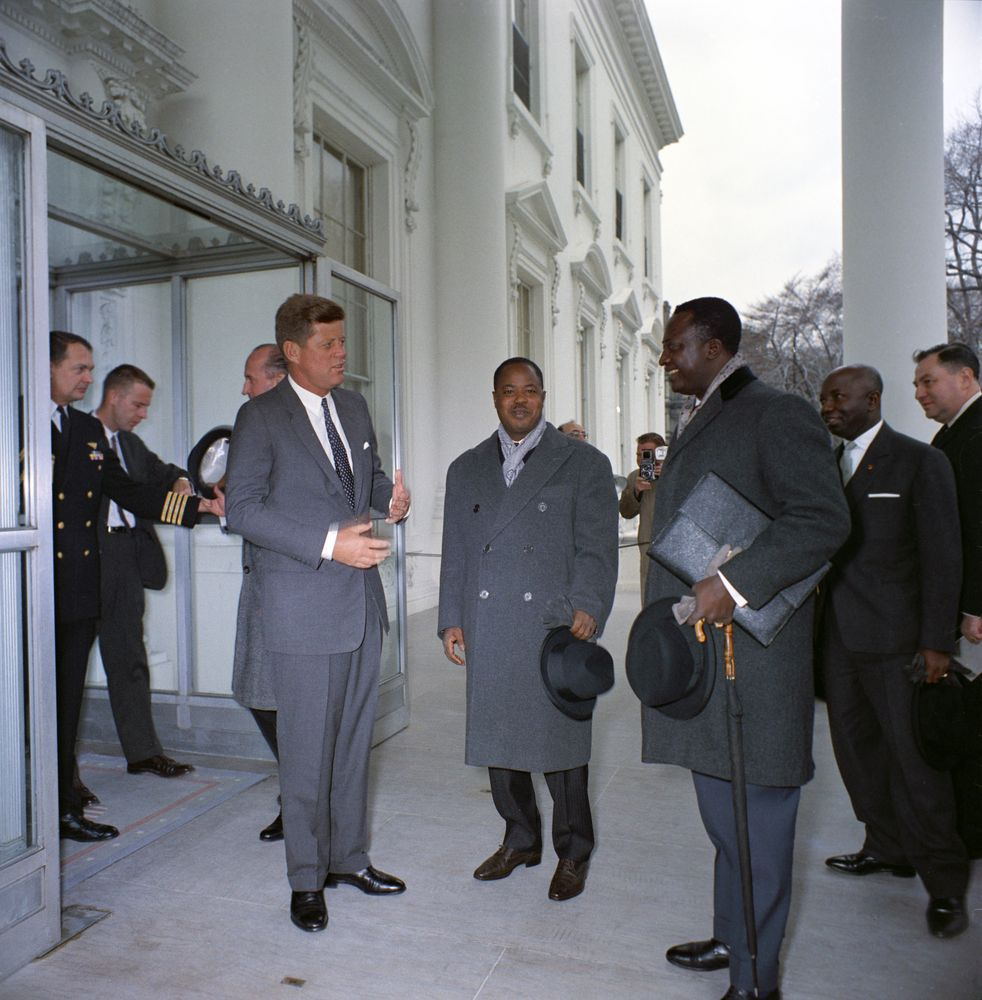
Ahidjo with John F. Kennedy, 13 March 1962

Ahidjo's support and collaboration in allowing for continued French influence economically and politically was faced with opposition from radicals who rejected French influence. These radicals were sympathetic to a more revolutionary, procommunist approach to decolonization. They formed their own political party, Union des Populations du Cameroun. In March 1959, Ahidjo addressed the United Nations General Assembly in order to gather support for France's independence plan. Influenced by Cold War tensions, the United Nations expressed concern about the UPC due to the party's pro-communist disposition. The United Nations moved to end French trusteeship in Cameroon without organizing new elections or lifting the ban that France had imposed on the UPC. Ahidjo experienced a rebellion in the 1960s from the UPC, but defeated it by 1970 with the aid of French military force. Ahidjo proposed and was granted four bills to gather power and declare a state of emergency in order to end the rebellion.

Following the independence of the French-controlled area of Cameroon, Ahidjo's focus turned on reuniting the British-controlled area of Cameroon with its newly independent counterpart. In addressing the United Nations, Ahidjo and his supporters favored integration and reunification whereas more radical players such as the UPC preferred immediate reunification. However, both sides were seeking a plebiscite for reunification of the separated Cameroons. The UN decided on the integration and reunification plebiscite. The plebiscite resulted in northern area of the British Cameroons voting to join Nigeria and the southern area voting to reunite with the rest of Cameroon. Ahidjo worked with Premier John Foncha of the Anglophone Cameroon throughout the process of integrating the two parts of Cameroon. In July 1961, Ahidjo attended a conference at which the plans and conditions for merging the Cameroons were made and later adopted by both the National Assemblies of the Francophone and Anglophone Cameroons. Ahidjo and Foncha met in Bamenda in order to create a constitution for the united territories. In their meetings, Ahidjo and Foncha agreed not to join the French community or the Commonwealth. In the summer of 1961, Ahidjo and Foncha resolved any issues between them and agreed upon the final draft for the constitution, which was drawn in Foumban, a city in West Cameroon. Despite the fact that the plans to establish a federalist state were made public in Foumban, Ahidjo and Foncha had private discussions before the official Foumban conference. On 1 October 1961, the two separate Cameroons were merged, establishing the Federal Republic of Cameroon with Ahidjo as the president and Foncha as the Vice President.

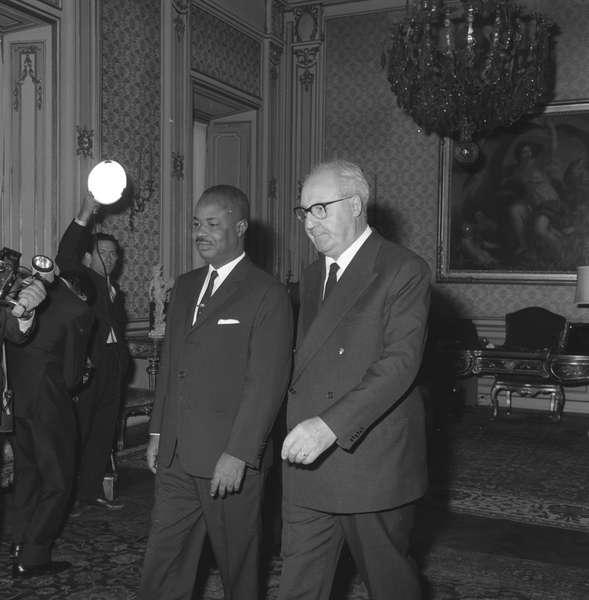
Italian president Giuseppe Saragat with Ahmadou Ahidjo in 1966

The issue of territorial administration was a topic of disagreement between Foncha and Ahidjo. In December 1961, Ahidjo issued a decree that split the federation into administrative regions under the Federal Inspectors of Administration. The inspectors were responsible to Ahidjo and for representing the federation, with access to police force and federal services. The power given to these inspectors led to conflict between them and Prime Ministers.

During the first years of the regime, the French ambassador Jean-Pierre Bénard is sometimes considered as the true "president" of Cameroon. This independence is indeed largely theoretical since French "advisers" are responsible for assisting each minister and have the reality of power. The Gaullist government preserves its influence over the country through the signing of "cooperation agreements" covering all sectors of Cameroon's sovereignty. Thus, in the monetary field, Cameroon retains the CFA franc and entrusts its monetary policy to its former guardian power. All strategic resources are exploited by France, French troops are maintained in the country, and a large proportion of Cameroonian army officers are French, including the Chief of Staff.

In 1961, Ahidjo began calling for a single-party state. On 12 March 1962, Ahidjo issued a decree that prevented criticism against his regime, giving the government the authority to imprison anyone found guilty of subversion against government authorities or laws. In July 1962, a group of opposition party leaders who had served in the government with Ahidjo, André-Marie Mbida, Charles Okala, Marcel Bey Bey Eyidi, and Theodore Mayi Martip, challenged Ahidjo's call for a single-party state, saying that it was dictatorial. These leaders were arrested, tried, and imprisoned on the grounds of subversion against the government. The arrest of these leaders resulted in many other opposition leaders joining Ahidjo's Party, the Union Camerounaise. On 1 September 1966, Ahidjo achieved his goal of creating a single-party state. The CNU was established, with Ahidjo maintaining that it was essential to the unity of Cameroon. In order to be elected to the National Assembly, membership in the CNU was required. Therefore, Ahidjo approved all nominations for the National Assembly as head of the party, and they approved all his legislation.

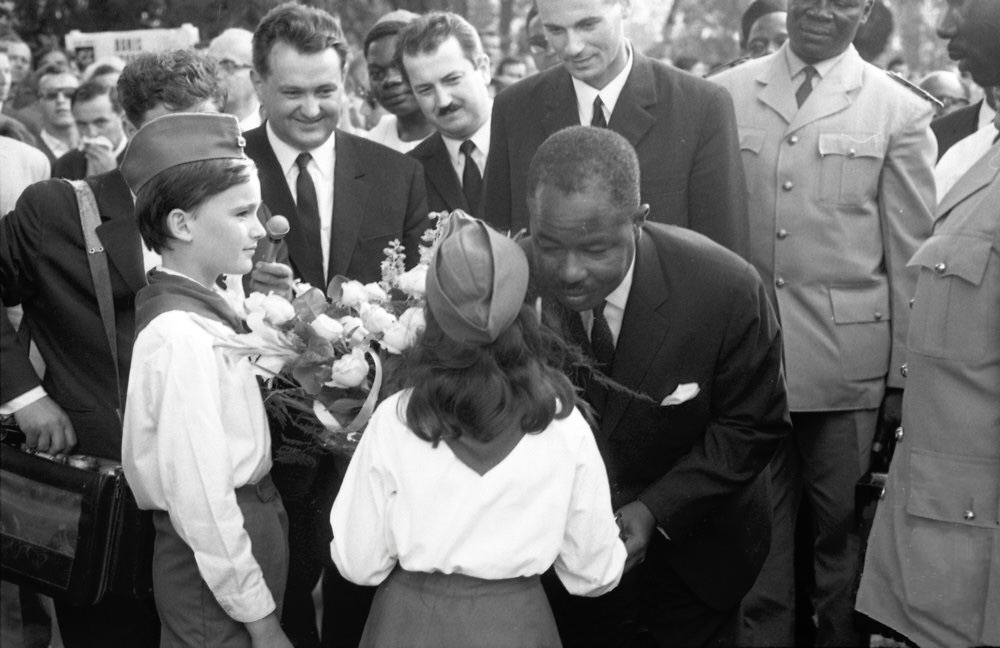
Ahidjo kissing Tito's Pioneers in Slovenia, SFRY, 1967

The authorities are multiplying the legal provisions enabling them to free themselves from the rule of law: arbitrary extension of police custody, prohibition of meetings and rallies, submission of publications to prior censorship, restriction of freedom of movement through the establishment of passes or curfews, prohibition for trade unions to issue subscriptions, etc. Anyone accused of "compromising public safety" is deprived of a lawyer and cannot appeal the judgment. Sentences of life imprisonment at hard labour or death penalty – executions can be public – are thus numerous. A one-party system was introduced in 1966.

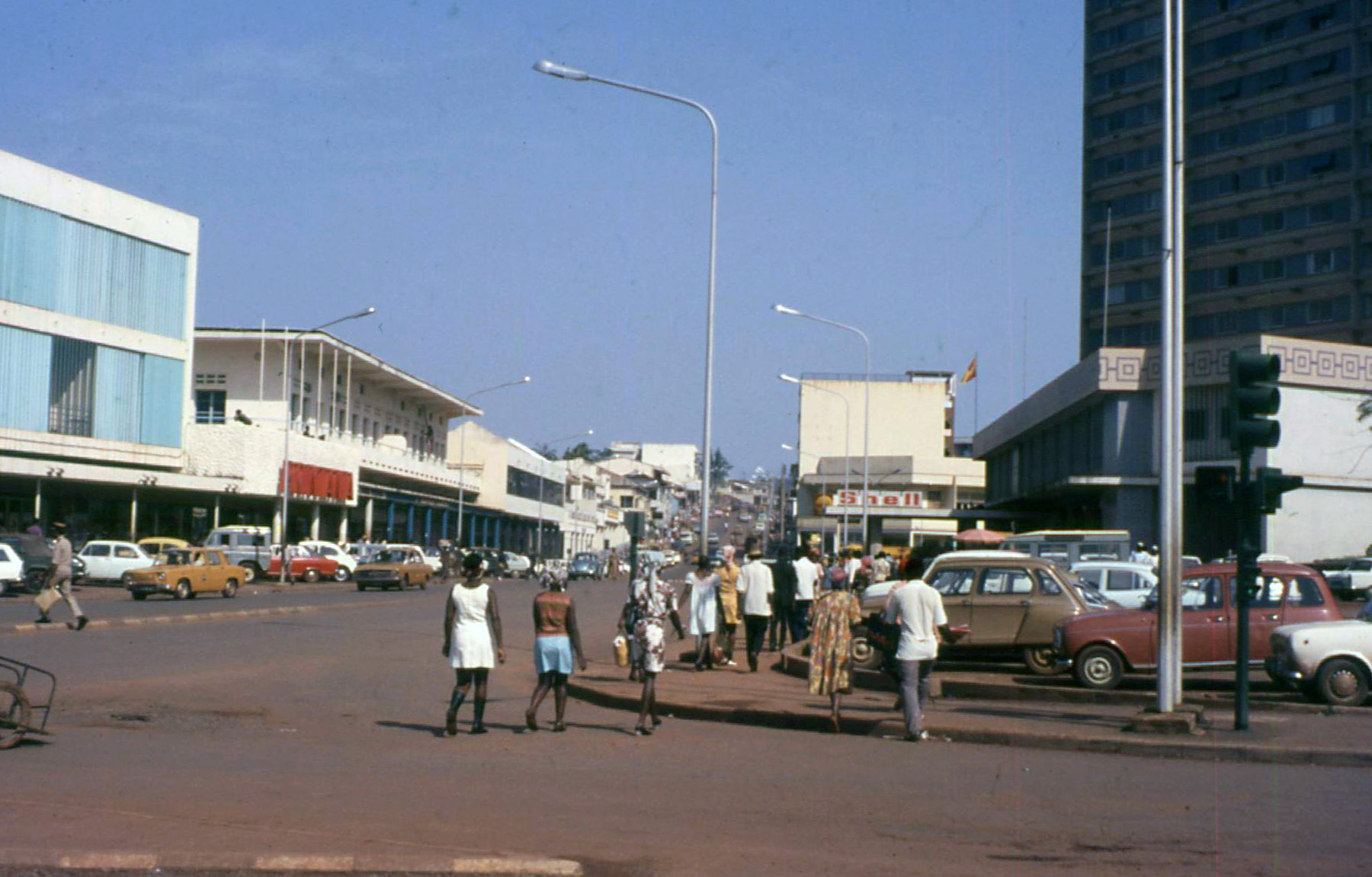
Ahidjo avenue in Yaoundé, February 1973

Ahidjo placed the blame for Cameroon's underdevelopment and poorly implemented town and public planning policies on Cameroon's federal structure, as well as charging federalism with maintaining cleavages and issues between the Anglophone and Francophone parts of Cameroon. Ahidjo's government also argued that managing separate governments in a poor country was too expensive. Ahidjo announced on 6 May 1972, that he wanted to abolish the federation and put a unitary state into place if the electorate supported the idea in a referendum set for 20 May 1972. This event became known as "The Glorious Revolution of May Twentieth." Because Ahidjo held control over the CNU, he was ensured the party's support in this initiative. Ahidjo issued Presidential Decree No. 72–720 on 2 June 1972, which established the United Republic of Cameroon and abolished the federation. A new constitution was adopted by Ahidjo's government in the same year, abolishing the position of Vice President, which served to further centralize power in Cameroon. Ahidjo's power presided over not only the state and government, but also as commander of the military. In 1975, however, Ahidjo instituted the position of Prime Minister, which was filled by Paul Biya. In 1979, Ahidjo initiated a change in the constitution designating the Prime Minister as successor. Until 1972, Cameroon's federation consisted of two relatively autonomous parts: the francophone and anglophone. After the federation was abolished, many anglophones were displeased with the changes.

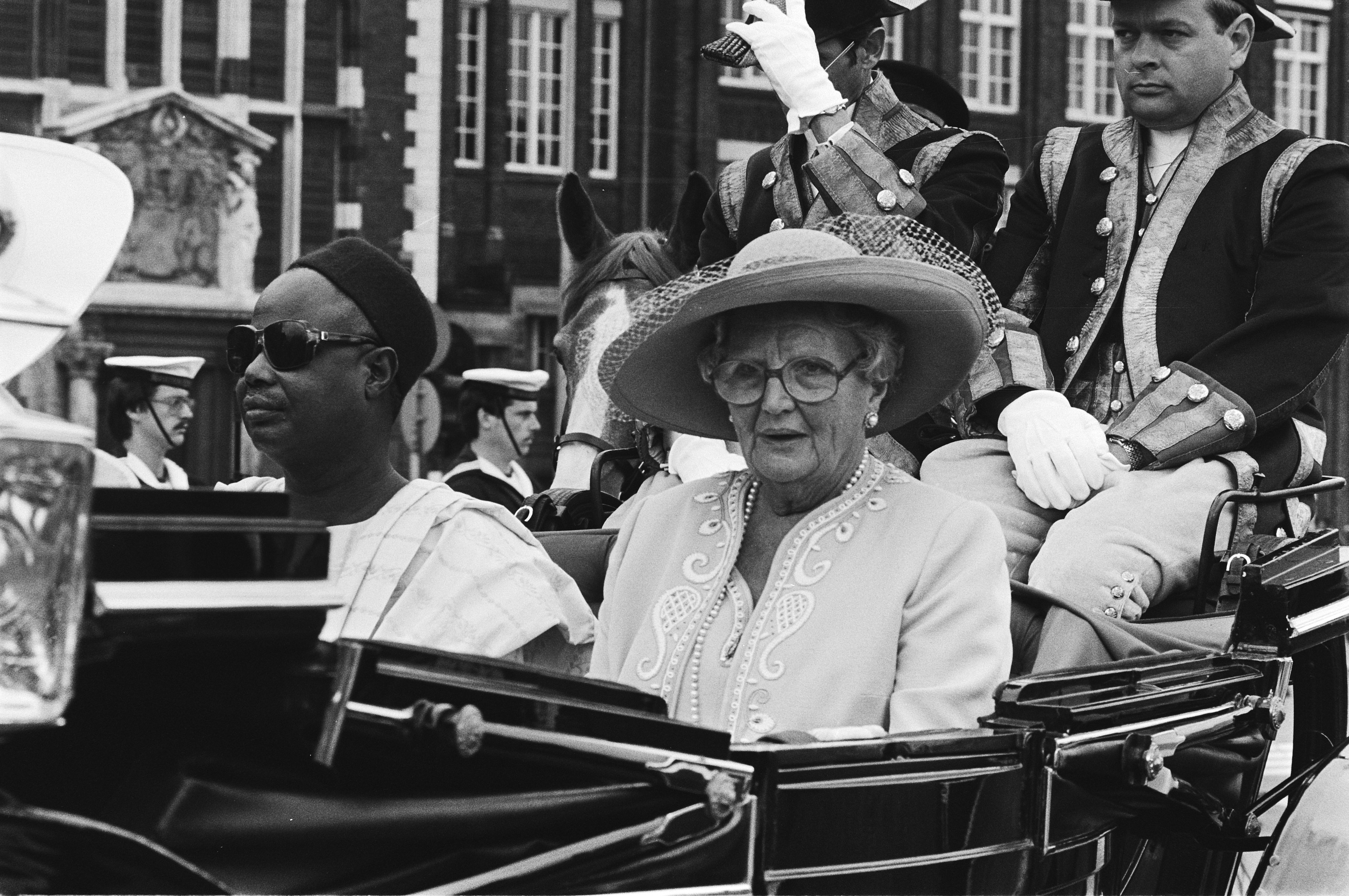
President Ahidjo and Queen Juliana of the Netherlands in 1979

In 1972, when Cameroon hosted the Africa Cup of Nations, Ahidjo ordered the construction of two new stadiums, the Ahmadou Ahidjo stadium and the Unification Stadium. The Unification Stadium was named in celebration of the country being renamed as the United Republic of Cameroon.

Cameroon became an oil-producing country in 1977. Claiming to want to make reserves for difficult times, the authorities manage "off-budget" oil revenues in total opacity (the funds are placed in Paris, Switzerland and New York accounts). Several billion dollars are thus diverted to the benefit of oil companies and regime officials. The influence of France and its 9,000 nationals in Cameroon remains considerable. African Affairs magazine noted in the early 1980s that they "continue to dominate almost all key sectors of the economy, much as they did before independence. French nationals control 55% of the modern sector of the Cameroonian economy and their control over the banking system is total.

Though many of his actions were dictatorial, Cameroon became one of the most stable in Africa. He was considered to be more conservative and less charismatic than most post-colonial African leaders, but his policies allowed Cameroon to attain comparative prosperity. Courtiers surrounding Ahidjo promoted the myth that he was "father of the nation."

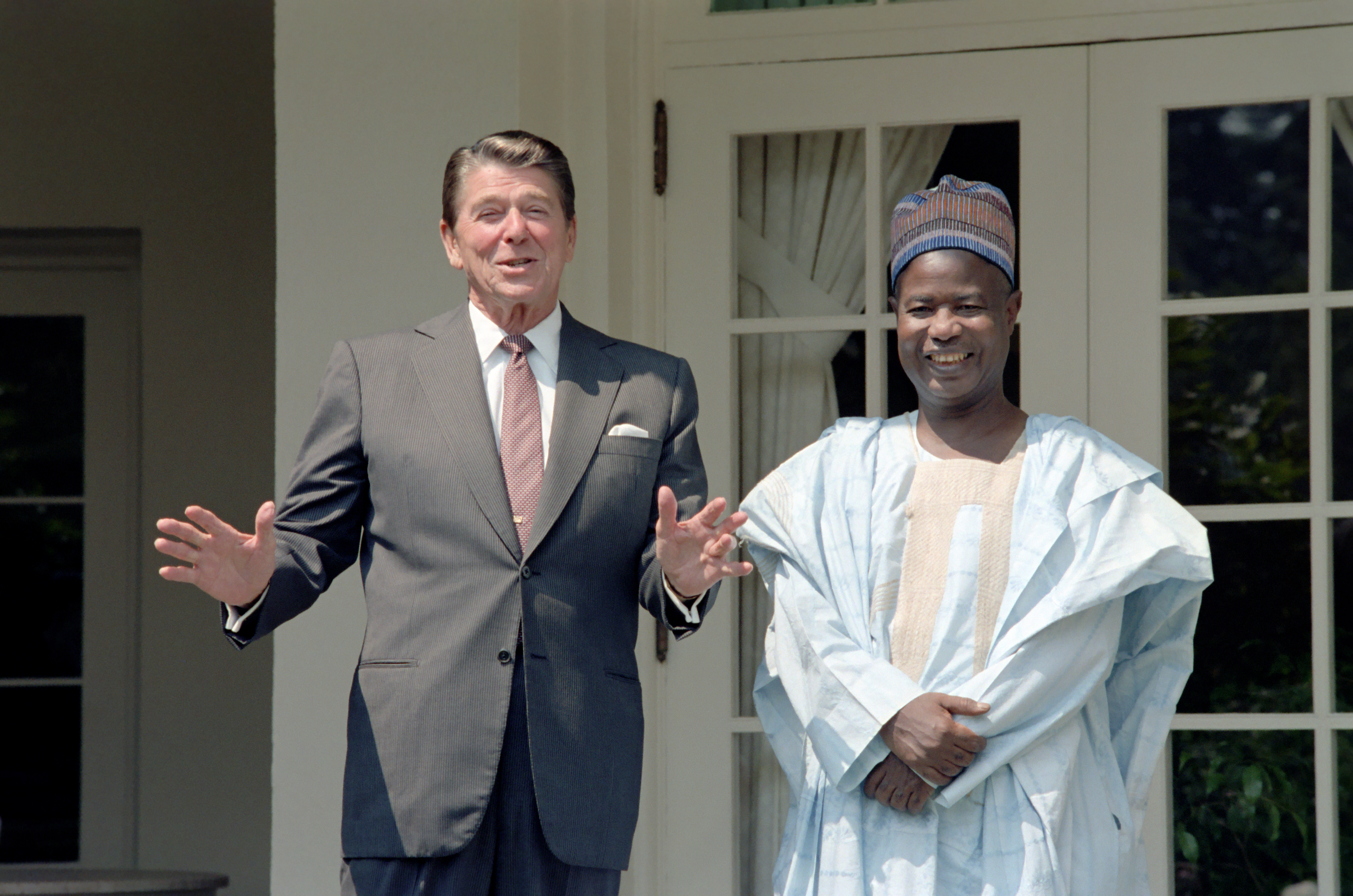
Ronald Reagan and Ahmadou Ahidjo in July 1982

Ahidjo's presidential style was cultivated around the image of himself as the father of the nation. He carried many titles, and after he visited Mecca, Ahidjo gained the title of "El Hadj." Ahidjo used radio to regularly lecture the nation and to announce the regular reassignment of government positions. Ahidjo built up a clientelistic network in which he redistributed state resources to maintain control over a diverse Cameroon. When Cameroon began seeing oil revenue, the president was in control of the funds. People received jobs, licenses, contracts, and projects through Ahidjo in exchange for loyalty.

During Ahidjo's presidency, music served a role in maintaining for national unity and development. Musicians wrote songs with themes of independence, unity, and Ahidjo as the father of the nation. On official holidays, schools would compete by writing patriotic songs in Ahidjo's honor. Songs that were critical of politicians were rare. Musicians such as Medzo Me Nsom encouraged the people of Cameroon to turn out at the polls and vote for Ahidjo.

== Post-presidency, later life and death ==
Ahidjo resigned, ostensibly for health reasons, on 4 November 1982 and was succeeded by Prime Minister Paul Biya two days later. That he stepped down in favor of Biya, a Christian from the south and not a Muslim from the north like himself, was considered surprising. Ahidjo's ultimate intentions were unclear; it is possible that he intended to return to the presidency at a later point when his health improved, and another possibility is that he intended for Maigari Bello Bouba, a fellow Muslim from the north who succeeded Biya as Prime Minister, to be his eventual successor as president, with Biya in effectively a caretaker role. Although the Central Committee of the ruling Cameroon National Union (CNU) urged Ahidjo to remain President, he declined to do so, but he did agree to remain as the President of the CNU. However, he also arranged for Biya to become the CNU Vice-President and handle party affairs in his absence. During the first few months of Biya's administration, there was cooperation between Biya and Ahidjo. In January 1983, Ahidjo dismissed four CNU members who opposed Biya's presidency. Additionally that month, Ahidjo and Biya both went on separate speaking tours to different parts of Cameroon in order to address the public's concerns.

Later that year, however, a major feud developed between Ahidjo and Biya. On 19 July 1983, Ahidjo went into exile in France, and Biya began removing Ahidjo's supporters from positions of power and eliminating symbols of his authority, removing official photographs of Ahidjo from the public as well as removing Ahidjo's name from the anthem of the CNU. On 22 August, Biya announced that a plot allegedly involving Ahidjo had been uncovered. For his part, Ahidjo severely criticized Biya, alleging that Biya was abusing his power, that he lived in fear of plots against him, and that he was a threat to national unity. The two were unable to reconcile despite the efforts of several foreign leaders, and Ahidjo announced on 27 August that he was resigning as head of the CNU. In exile, Ahidjo was sentenced to death in absentia in February 1984, along with two others, for participation in the June 1983 coup plot, although Biya commuted the sentence to life in prison. Ahidjo denied involvement in the plot. A violent but unsuccessful coup attempt in April 1984 was also widely believed to have been orchestrated by Ahidjo.

In his remaining years, Ahidjo divided his time between France and Senegal. He died of a heart attack in Dakar on 30 November 1989 and was buried there. He was officially rehabilitated by a law in December 1991. Biya said on 30 October 2007 that the matter of returning Ahidjo's remains to Cameroon was "a family affair". An agreement on returning Ahidjo's remains was reached in June 2009, and it was expected that they would be returned in 2010. However, as of 2021, Ahidjo remains in Dakar, buried alongside his wife, who died in April of that year.

== Notes ==
Political offices
Preceded by André-Marie Mbida	Prime Minister of Cameroon; 1958–1960	Succeeded by Charles Assalé
Preceded by (none)	President of Cameroon; 1960–1982	Succeeded by Paul Biya
