= History of Cameroon =

At the crossroads of West Africa and Central Africa, the territory of what is now Cameroon has seen human habitation since some time in the Middle Paleolithic, likely no later than 130,000 years ago. The earliest discovered archaeological evidence of humans dates from around 30,000 years ago at Shum Laka. The Bamenda highlands in western Cameroon near the border with Nigeria are one of the most likely origin for the Bantu peoples, whose language and culture came to dominate most of central and southern Africa between 1000 BCE and 1000 CE.

European traders arrived in the fifteenth century and Cameroon was the exonym given by the Portuguese to the Wouri River, which they called Rio dos Camarões—"river of shrimps" or "shrimp river", referring to the then-abundant Cameroon ghost shrimp. Cameroon was a source of slaves for the slave trade. While the northern part of Cameroon was subject to influence from the Islamic kingdoms in the Chad basin and the Sahel, the south was largely ruled by small kings, chieftains, and fons.

Cameroon as a political entity emerged from the colonization of Africa by Europeans. From 1884, Cameroon was a German colony, German Kamerun, with its borders drawn through negotiations between the Germans, British, and French. After the First World War, the League of Nations mandated France to administer most of the territory, with the United Kingdom administering a small portion in the west. Following World War II, the League of Nations' successor, the United Nations, instituted a Trusteeship system, leaving France and Britain in control of their respective regions, French Cameroon and British Cameroon. In 1960, Cameroon became independent with part of British Cameroons voting to join former French Cameroon. Cameroon has had only two presidents since independence and while opposition parties were legalized in 1990 only one party has ever governed. Cameroon has maintained close relations with France and allied itself largely with Western political and economic interests throughout the Cold War and into the twenty-first century. This consistency gave Cameroon a reputation as one of the most stable countries in the region. In 2017, tensions between Anglophone Cameroonians in former British territory and the Francophone-dominated government led to an ongoing civil war known as the Anglophone Crisis in the west of the country, while Islamist insurgents Boko Haram continue to carry out military and terror attacks in the north of the country.

In January 2024, Cameroon launched the world's first routine malaria vaccine program, using the World Health Organization (WHO)-approved RTS,S vaccine developed by British drugmaker GSK. The initiative aims to save thousands of African children's lives annually. Despite some skepticism, health experts emphasize careful community outreach to combat vaccine hesitancy and stress the importance of using existing preventive measures alongside vaccines.

== Pre-colonial history ==
=== Prehistory ===
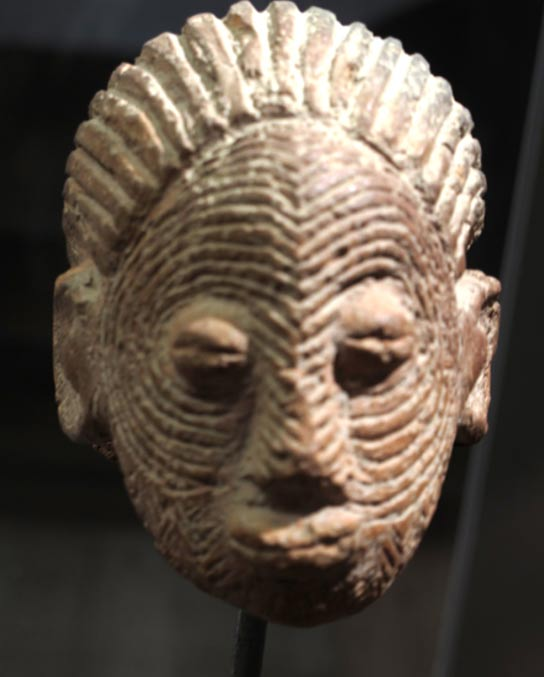
Terracotta Sao statuette

Map showing the approximate extent of the Sokoto Caliphate in 1875 as well as the remnants of the Kanem-Bornu empire

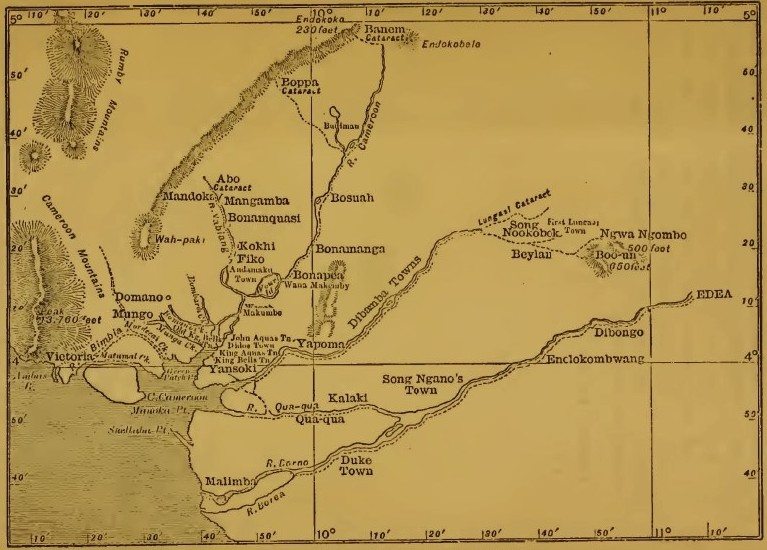
Map of pre-colonial Cameroon coastline published in 1884

Archaeological research has been relatively scarce in Cameroon due to a lack of resources and transportation infrastructure. Historically the warm, wet climate in many parts of the country was thought of as inhospitable to the preservation of remains, but recent finds and the introduction of new techniques have challenged that assumption. Evidence from digs at Shum Laka in the Northwest Region shows human occupation dating back 30,000 years while in the dense forests of the south, the oldest evidence of occupation is around 7000 years old. Recent research in southern Cameroon indicates that the Iron Age may have started there as early as 1000 BCE and was certainly well established by 100 BCE at the latest.

Linguistic analysis, supported by archaeological and genetic research, has shown that the Bantu expansion, a series of migrations that spread Bantu culture across much of Sub-Saharan Africa, most likely originated in the highlands on the Nigeria-Cameroon border around 1000 BCE. Bantu languages spread with these people along with agricultural methods and possibly iron tools, first east and then south, forming one of the largest language families in Africa. In Cameroon, Bantu people largely displaced Central African Pygmies such as the Baka, who were hunter-gatherers and who now survive in much smaller numbers in the heavily forested southeast. Despite Cameroon being the original homeland of the Bantu people, the great medieval Bantu-speaking kingdoms arose elsewhere, such as what is now Kenya, Congo, Angola, and South Africa.

=== Northern Cameroon ===
The earliest known civilization to have left clear traces of their presence in the territory of modern Cameroon is known as the Sao civilisation. Known for their elaborate terracotta and bronze artwork and round, walled settlements in the Lake Chad Basin, little else is known with any certainty due to the lack of historical records. The culture possibly arose as early as the fourth century BC but certainly, by the end of the first millennium BC, their presence was well established around Lake Chad and near the Chari River. The city-states of the Sao reached their apex sometime between the ninth and fifteenth centuries AD. The Sao were displaced or assimilated by the sixteenth century.

After the Muslim conquest of North Africa in 709, Islam's influence began to spread south with the growth of trans-Saharan trade, including in what is now northern Cameroon. The Kanem-Bornu Empire began in what is now Chad and likely came into conflict with the Sao. The Kanem Empire began in Chad in the eighth century and gradually extended its influence northward into Libya and southward into Nigeria and Cameroon. Slaves from raids in the south were their principal trade good along with mined salt. The Empire was Muslim from at least the eleventh century and reached its first peak in the 13th, controlling most of what is now Chad and smaller regions in surrounding countries. After a period of internal instability, the center of power shifted to Bornu with its capital at Ngazargamu, in what is now northwestern Nigeria, and territory was gradually reconquered and new territory in present-day Niger also conquered. The Empire began to decline in the seventeenth century though it continued to control much of northern Cameroon.

From 1804 to 1808 the Fulani War saw the Bornu pushed north out of Cameroon and the Sokoto Caliphate took control of the region, as well as most of northern Nigeria and large swathes of Niger and Mali. A feudal empire with local rulers pledging allegiance and paying tributes to the Caliph, northern Cameroon was likely part of the Adamawa Emirate within the Caliphate. This structure proved susceptible to exploitation by colonial powers beginning in the 1870s, who sought to undermine local rulers' ties to the Caliphate.

=== Southern Regions ===
The Muslim empires of the Sahara and Sahel never reached further south than the highlands of the Cameroon Line. Further south, there is little archaeological evidence of large empires or kingdoms and no historical record due to the lack of writing in the region. When the Portuguese arrived in the region in the fifteenth century, a large number of kings, chiefs, and fons ruled small territories. Many ethnic groups, particularly speakers of the Grassfields languages in the west, have oral histories of migrating south fleeing Muslim invaders, likely reference to the Fulani War and subsequent conflicts in Nigeria and northern Cameroon.

Malaria prevented significant European settlement or exploration until the late 1870s, when large supplies of the malaria suppressant quinine became available. The early European presence in Cameroon was primarily devoted to coastal trade and the acquisition of slaves. The Cameroon coast was a major hub for the purchase of slaves who were taken across the Atlantic to Brazil, the United States, and the Caribbean. In 1807, the British abolished slavery in the Empire and began military efforts to suppress the slave trade, particularly in West Africa. Combined with the end of legal slave imports in the United States the same year, the international slave trade in Cameroon declined sharply. Christian missionaries established a presence in the late nineteenth century. Around this time, the Aro Confederacy, was expanding its economic and political influence from southeastern Nigeria into western Cameroon. However, the arrival of British and German colonizers cut short its growth and influence.

== Colonial period ==
=== Scramble for Africa and German Kamerun (1884–1918) ===
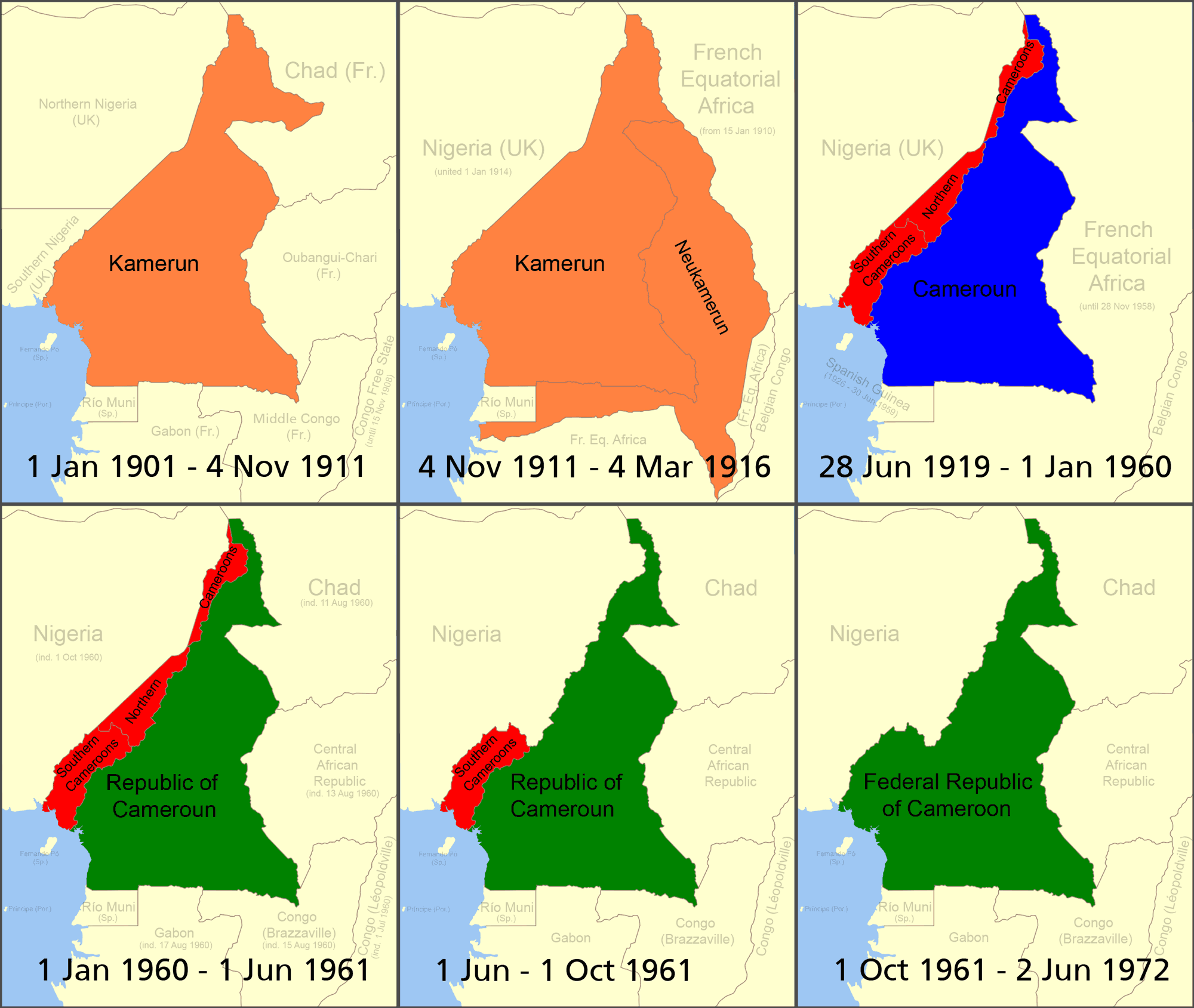
Cameroon over time German Kamerun British Cameroons French Cameroun Republic of Cameroon

The Scramble for Africa beginning in the late 1870s, saw European powers, primarily seeking to establish formal control over the parts of Africa not yet colonized. The Cameroon coast was of interest to both the British, already established in what is now Nigeria and with missionaries outposts in several towns, and the Germans who had extensive trading relationships and plantations established in the Douala region. On July 5, 1884, German explorer and administrator Gustav Nachtigal began signing agreements with Duala leaders establishing a German protectorate in the region. A brief conflict ensued with rival Duala chiefs which Germany and its allies won, leaving the British with little choice but to acknowledge Germany's claim to the region. The borders of modern Cameroon were established through a series of negotiations with the British and French. Germany established an administration for the colony with a capital first at Buea and later at Yaoundé and continued to explore the interior and co-opt or subjugate local rulers. The largest conflicts were the Bafut Wars and the Adamawa Wars which ended by 1907 with German victories.

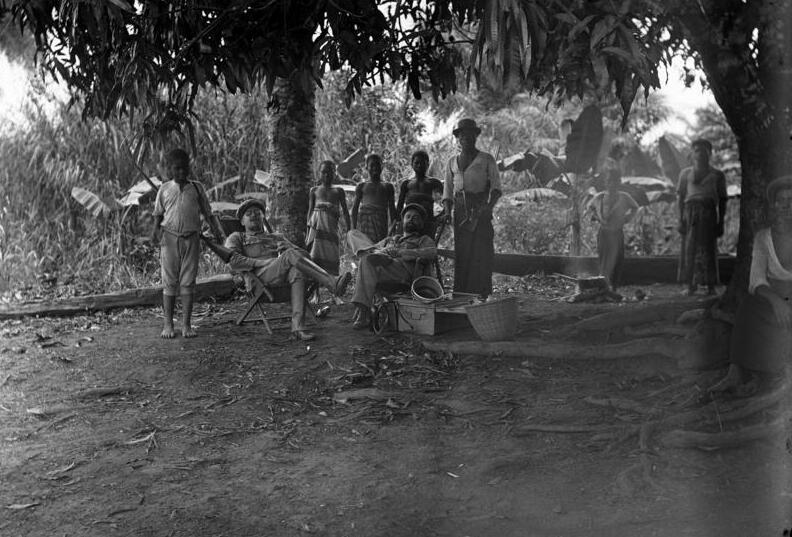
German Settlers celebrating Christmas in Kamerun

Germany was particularly interested in Cameroon's agricultural potential and entrusted large firms with the task of exploiting and exporting it. German Chancellor Otto von Bismarck defined the order of priorities as follows: "first the merchant, then the soldier". It was under the influence of a businessman Adolph Woermann, whose company set up a trading house in Douala, that Bismarck, initially skeptical about the interest of the colonial project, was convinced. Large German trading companies (Woermann, Jantzen & Thormählen) and concession companies (Südkamerun Gesellschaft, Nord-West Kamerun Gesellschaft) established themselves massively in the colony. Letting the big companies impose their order, the administration simply supported them, protected them, and tried to eliminate indigenous rebellions.

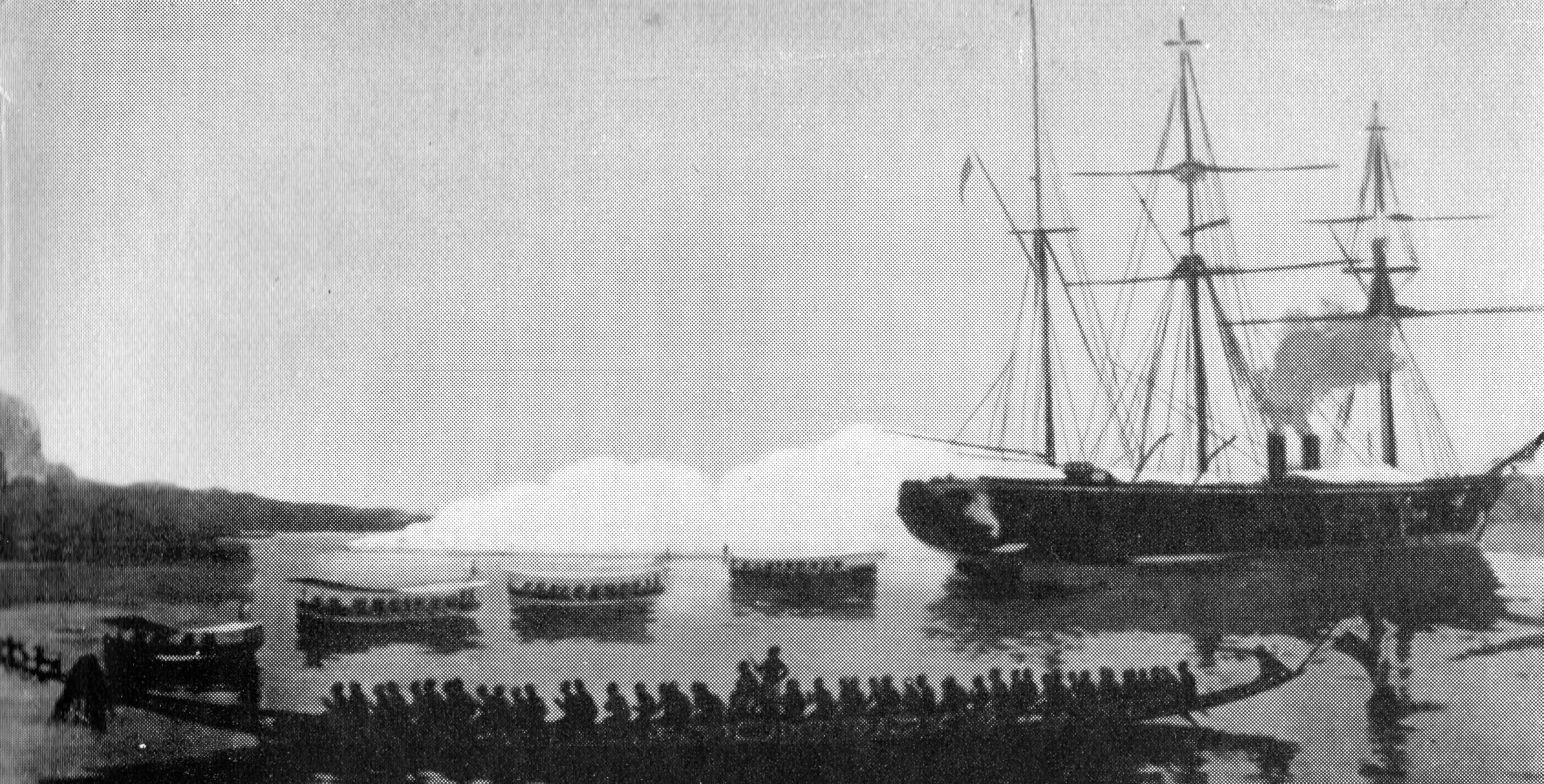
The German corvette SMS OLGA bombarding Hickorytown (now Douala in December 1884

The Imperial German government made substantial investments in the infrastructure of Cameroon, including the extensive railways, such as the 160-metre single-span railway bridge on the southern branch of Sanaga River. However, the indigenous peoples proved reluctant to work on these projects, so the Germans instigated a harsh and unpopular system of forced labour. In fact, Jesko von Puttkamer was relieved of duty as governor of the colony due to his untoward actions toward the native Cameroonians. In 1911 at the Treaty of Fez after the Agadir Crisis, France ceded a nearly 300,000 km^{2} portion of the territory of French Equatorial Africa to Kamerun which became Neukamerun (New Cameroon), while Germany ceded a smaller area in the north in present-day Chad to France.

Shortly after the outbreak of World War I in 1914, the British invaded Cameroon from Nigeria and the French from French Equatorial Africa in the Kamerun campaign. The last German fort in the country surrendered in February 1916. After the Allied victory, the territory was partitioned between the United Kingdom and France, which was formalized on June 28, 1919, with League of Nations mandates (Class B). France gained the larger geographical share, transferred Neukamerun back to neighboring French colonies, and ruled the rest from Yaoundé as Cameroun (French Cameroons). Britain's territory, a strip bordering Nigeria from the sea to Lake Chad, with a roughly equal population was ruled from Lagos as part of Nigeria, known as Cameroons (British Cameroons).

=== French Cameroon (1918–1960) ===
==== League of Nations Mandate, Free France, and UN Trust Territory ====
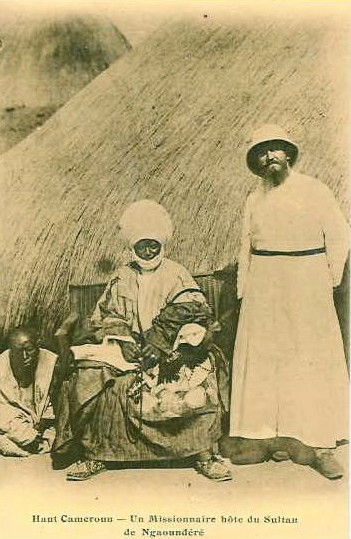
French Missionary with the Sultan of Ngaoundéré in 1920

The French administration declined to return much of the property in Cameroon to its prior German owners, reassigning much of it to French companies. This was particularly the case for the Société financière des Caoutchoucs, which obtained plantations put into operation during the German period and became the largest company in French Cameroon. Roads and other infrastructure projects were undertaken with native labor, often in extremely harsh conditions. The Douala-Yaoundé railway line, begun under the German regime, was completed. Thousands of workers were forcibly deported to this site to work fifty-four hours a week. Workers also suffered from lack of food and the massive presence of mosquitoes and related illnesses. In 1925, the mortality rate on the site was 61.7%. However, the other sites were not as deadly, although working conditions were generally very harsh.

French Cameroon joined the Free France in August 1940. The system established by Free France was essentially a military dictatorship. Philippe Leclerc de Hauteclocque established a state of siege throughout the country and abolished almost all public freedom. The objective was to neutralize any potential feelings of independence or sympathy for the former German colonizer. Indigenous people known for their Germanophilia were executed in public places. In 1945, the country was placed under the supervision of the United Nations, as successor to the League of Nations, which left Cameroon under French control as a UN Trust Territory.

==== Independence Movement ====
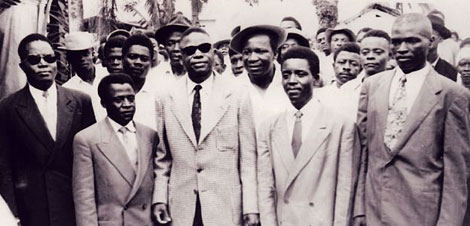
The leaders of the UPC

In 1948, the Union des populations du Cameroun (UPC), a nationalist movement, was founded and Ruben Um Nyobe took over as its leader. In May 1955, the arrests of independence activists were followed by riots in several cities across the country. The repression caused several dozen or hundreds of deaths - the French administration officially lists twenty-two, although secret reports acknowledge many more. The UPC was banned and nearly 800 of its activists were arrested, many of whom would be beaten in prison. Because they were wanted by the police, UPC activists took refuge in the forests, where they formed guerilla bands; they also took refuge in neighboring British Cameroon. The French authorities repressed these events and made arbitrary arrests. The party received the support of personalities such as Gamal Abdel Nasser and Kwame Nkrumah and France's action was denounced at the UN by representatives of countries such as India, Syria, and the Soviet Union.

An insurrection broke out among the Bassa people on 18 to 19 December 1956. Several dozen anti-UPC figures were murdered or kidnapped, bridges, telephone lines, and other infrastructure were sabotaged. The French military and native security forces violently repressed these uprisings, which led to many native Cameroonians joining the cause of independence and long-running guerilla war. Several UPC militias were formed though their access to weapons was very limited. Though the UPC was a multi-ethnic movement, the pro-independence movement was seen as particularly strong among the Bamileke and Bassa peoples, and both were targeted by the French for severe repression, including razing of villages, forced relocations, and indiscriminate killings in what was sometimes called the Bamileke War or the Cameroon Independence War. Though the uprising was suppressed, guerilla violence and reprisals continued even after independence.

Legislative elections were held on 23 December 1956 and the resulting Assembly passed a decree on 16 April 1957 which made French Cameroon a state. It took back its former status of associated territory as a member of the French Union. Its inhabitants became Cameroonian citizens, and Cameroonian institutions were created under a parliamentary democracy. On 12 June 1958, the Legislative Assembly of French Cameroon asked the French government to: "Accord independence to the State of Cameroon at the ends of their trusteeship. Transfer every competence related to the running of internal affairs of Cameroon to Cameroonians". On 19 October 1958, France recognized the right of its United Nations trust territory to choose independence. On 24 October 1958, the Legislative Assembly of French Cameroon solemnly proclaimed the desire of Cameroonians to see their country accede full independence on 1 January 1960. It enjoined the government of French Cameroon to ask France to inform the General Assembly of the United Nations, to abrogate the trusteeship accord concomitant with the independence of French Cameroon.

On 12 November 1958, France asked the United Nations to grant French Cameroon independence and end the Trusteeship. On 5 December 1958, the United Nations’ General Assembly took note of the French government's declaration according to which French Cameroon would gain independence on 1 January 1960. On 13 March 1959, the United Nations’ General Assembly resolved that the UN Trusteeship Agreement with France for French Cameroon would end when French Cameroon became independent on 1 January 1960.

=== British Cameroons (1918–1961) ===
==== Nigerian administration ====
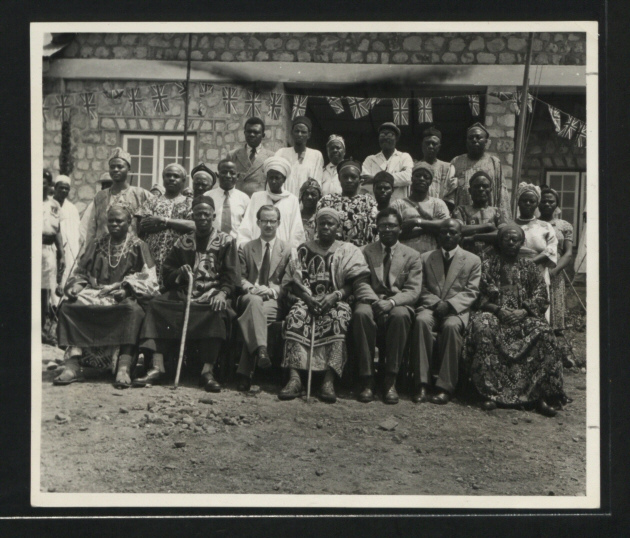
The first Premier of Southern Cameroons, Dr. Endeley (first row, third from right) in Bamenda

The British territory was administered as two areas, Northern Cameroons and Southern Cameroons. Northern Cameroons consisted of two non-contiguous sections, divided by a point where the Nigerian and Cameroon borders met and were governed as part of the Northern Region of Nigeria. Southern Cameroons was administered as a province of Eastern Nigeria. In British Cameroons, many German administrators were allowed to run the plantations of the southern coastal area after World War I. A British parliamentary publication, Report on the British Sphere of the Cameroons (May 1922, p. 62-8), reported that the German plantations there were "as a whole . . . wonderful examples of industry, based on solid scientific knowledge. The natives have been taught discipline and have come to realize what can be achieved by industry. Large numbers who return to their villages take up cocoa or other cultivation on their own account, thus increasing the general prosperity of the country." In the 1930s, most of the white population still consisted of Germans, most of whom were interned in British camps starting in June 1940. The native population showed little interest in volunteering for the British forces during World War II; only 3,500 men did so.

When the League of Nations ceased to exist in 1946, British Cameroons was reclassified as a UN trust territory, administered through the UN Trusteeship Council, but remained under British control. The United Nations approved the Trusteeship Agreements for British Cameroons to be governed by Britain on June 12, 1946.

==== Plebiscite and independence ====
French Cameroun became independent, as Cameroun or Cameroon, in January 1960, and Nigeria was scheduled for independence later that same year, which raised the question of what to do with the British territory. After some discussion (which had been going on since 1959), a plebiscite was agreed to and held on 11 February 1961. The Muslim-majority Northern area opted for union with Nigeria, and the Southern area voted to join Cameroon.

== Independence and presidency of Ahmadou Ahidjo (1960–1982) ==
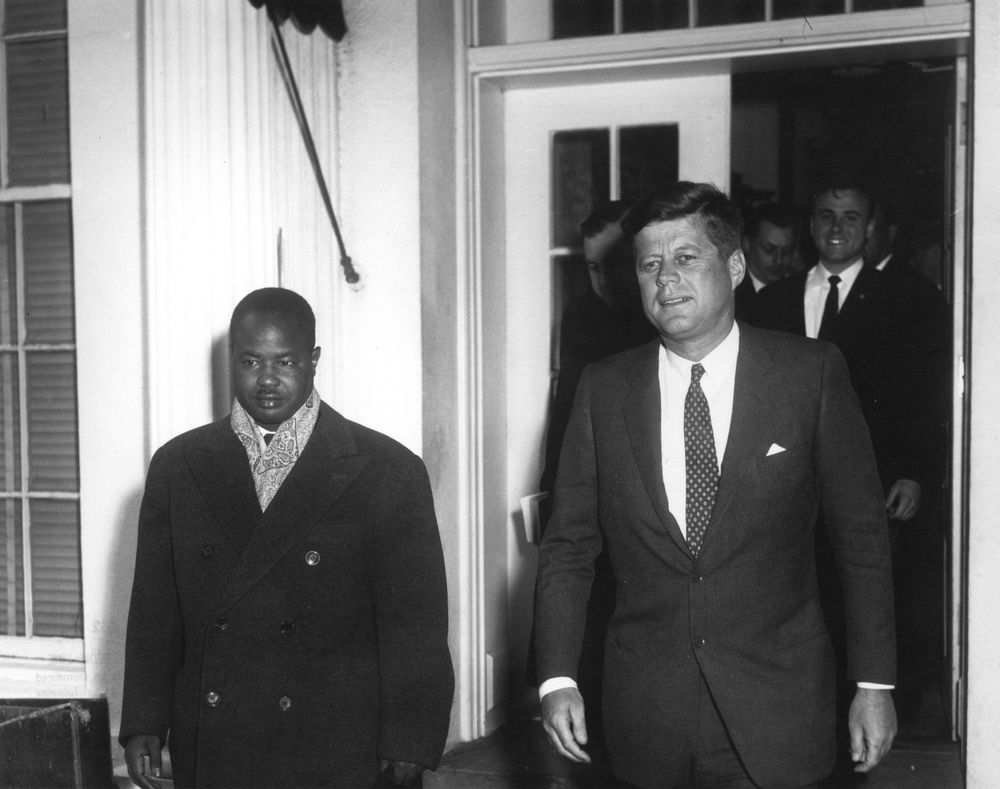
President Ahmadou Ahidjo with U.S. President John F. Kennedy in 1962

French Cameroon achieved independence on January 1, 1960. After Guinea, it was the second of France's colonies in Sub-Saharan Africa to become independent. On 21 February 1960, the new nation held a constitutional referendum, approving a new constitution. On 5 May 1960, Ahmadou Ahidjo became president. Ahidjo aligned himself closely with France and allowed many French advisers and administrators to stay on as well as leaving most of the country's assets in the hands of French companies.

=== Union with Southern Cameroon ===
On 12 February 1961, the results of the Southern Cameroon plebiscite were announced and it was learned that Southern Cameroons had voted for unification with the Republic Of Cameroon, sometimes called "reunification" since both regions had been part of German Kamerun. To negotiate the terms of this union, the Foumban Conference was held on 16–21 July 1961. John Ngu Foncha, the leader of the Kamerun National Democratic Party and the Southern Cameroons elected government represented Southern Cameroons while Ahidjo represented Cameroon. The agreement reached was a new constitution, based heavily on the version adopted in Cameroon earlier that year, but with a federal structure granting former British Cameroons - now West Cameroon - jurisdiction over certain issues and procedural rights. Buea became the capital of West Cameroon while Yaounde doubled as the federal capital and East Cameroonian capital. Neither side was particularly satisfied as Ahidjo had wanted a unitary or more centralized state while the West Cameroonians had wanted more explicit protections. On 14 August 1961, the federal constitution was adopted, with Ahidjo as president. Foncha became the prime minister of West Cameroon and vice president of the Federal Republic of Cameroon. The unification of British and French Cameroon has caused linguistic and cultural tensions within Cameroon, which has led to violence.

=== Civil War and repression ===
The UPC, many among whom espoused Marxist or other leftist ideologies and had demanded a full break with France, were not satisfied with Ahidjo's rule and close cooperation with the French. They did not lay down their arms at independence and sought to overthrow Ahidjo's regime, which they viewed as too subservient to France. Ahidjo requested continued French assistance in suppressing the UPC rebels in what became known as the Bamileke War, after the region where much of the fighting took place. The UPC was ultimately defeated with government forces capturing the last important rebel leader in 1970. During the intervening years, Ahidjo used emergency powers granted due to the war and the fear of further ethnic conflict to consolidate power. He implemented a highly centralized and authoritarian government that used arbitrary police custody, prohibition of meetings and rallies, submission of publications to prior censorship, restriction of freedom of movement through the establishment of passes or curfews, and a prohibition on trade unions to prevent opposition. Anyone accused of "compromising public safety" was handled outside traditional criminal process without the right to a lawyer or any appeal. Sentences of life imprisonment, hard labor or death were numerous, and executions were often public.

In 1966, opposition parties were banned and Cameroon became a one-party state. On 28 March 1970, Ahidjo was re-elected as president with 100% of the vote and 99.4% turnout. Solomon Tandeng Muna became vice president. In 1972, a referendum was held on a new constitution, which replaced the federation between East and West with a unitary state called the United Republic of Cameroon and further expanded the power of the president. Official results claimed 98.2% turnout and 99.99% of votes in favor of the new constitution. Although Ahidjo's rule was authoritarian, he was seen as noticeably lacking in charisma in comparison to many post-colonial African leaders. He didn't follow the anti-Western policies pursued by many of these leaders, which helped Cameroon achieve a degree of comparative political stability, retain Western investment, and see fairly steady economic growth.

=== Discovery of oil ===
Cameroon became an oil-producing country in 1977. The accounting of oil revenues was totally opaque and many Cameroonians felt the money was mismanaged or embezzled since. Oil remains a primary driver of the economy, though the country is not as oil-dependent as many other producers in the region.

== Presidency of Paul Biya (1982–present) ==
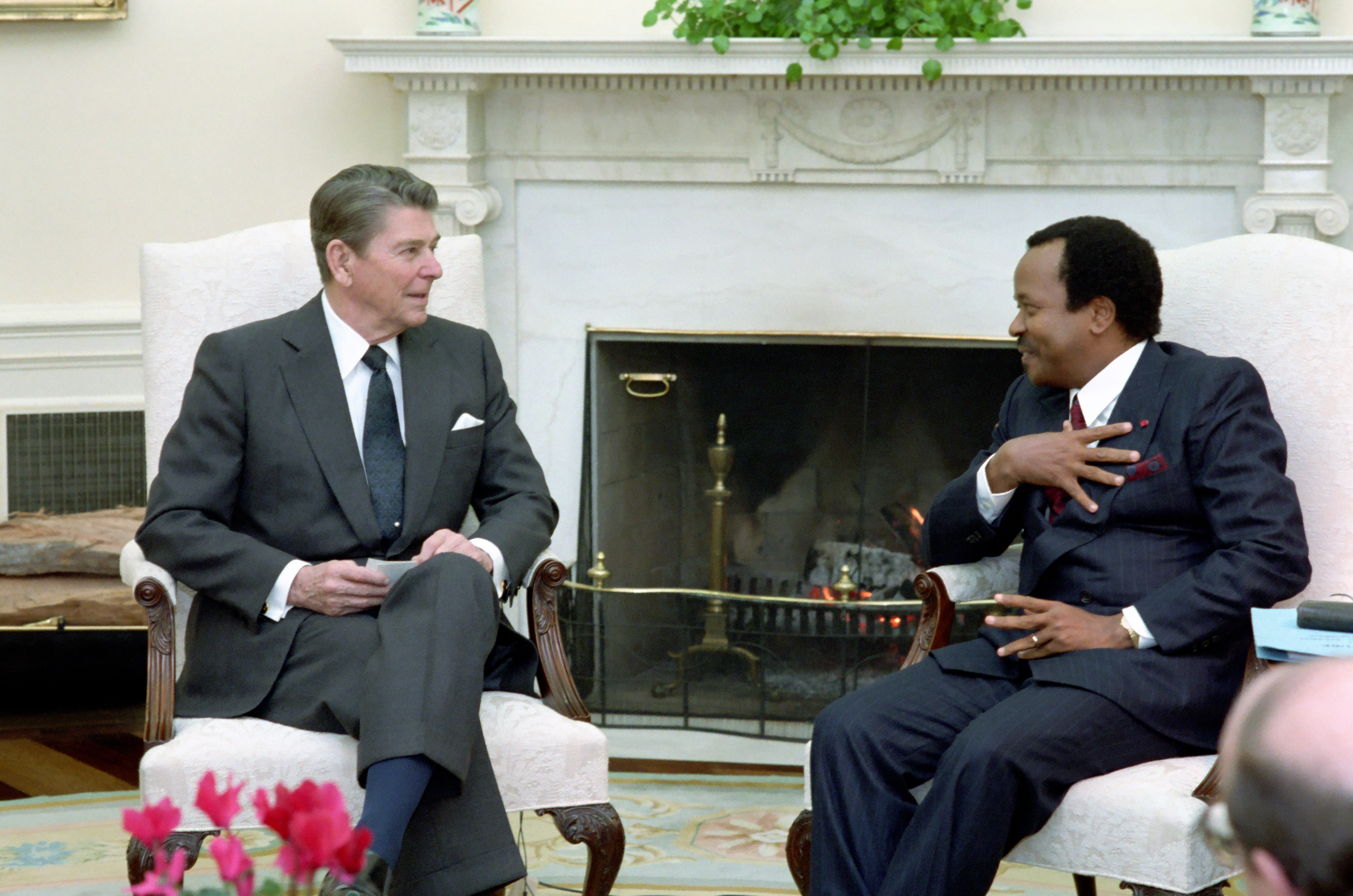
Paul Biya with U.S. President Ronald Reagan in 1986

On 30 June 1975, Paul Biya, a long-serving bureaucrat and administrator in the Ahidjo government, was appointed Prime Minister. On 4 November 1982, Ahidjo resigned as president and was succeeded by Biya under the constitution. Many observers were surprised, as Biya was a Christian from the south while Ahidjo was 59 years old and a Muslim from the north. However, Ahidjo did not resign from his role as leader of the governing party, and many speculated that he hoped Biya would be a figurehead, or perhaps even a temporary caretaker, as Ahidjo was rumored to be ill and receiving medical care in France.

=== Rift and coup attempt ===
Despite previous good relations, in 1983 signs of a rift became apparent between Biya and Ahidjo. Ahidjo left for France and publicly accused Biya of abuse of power. Ahidjo sought to use his continuing control over the party apparatus to sideline Biya, by causing the party, not the president to set the government's agenda. However, at the party conference in September, Biya was elected to lead the party and Ahidjo resigned. In January 1984, Biya was elected president of the country, running unopposed. In February, two senior officials were arrested and, along with Ahidjo who was tried in absentia alongside them.

On April 6, 1984, supporters of Ahidjo attempted a coup d'état, led by the Republican Guard, an elite force recruited by Ahidjo, mainly from the north. The Republican Guard under Colonel Saleh Ibrahim took control of the Yaounde airport, national radio station, and other key points around the capital. However, Biya was able to hole up in the presidential palace with his bodyguard until troops from outside the capital were able to retake control within two days. Ahidjo denied knowledge or responsibility for the coup attempt but was widely viewed as behind it.

=== Limnic eruptions ===
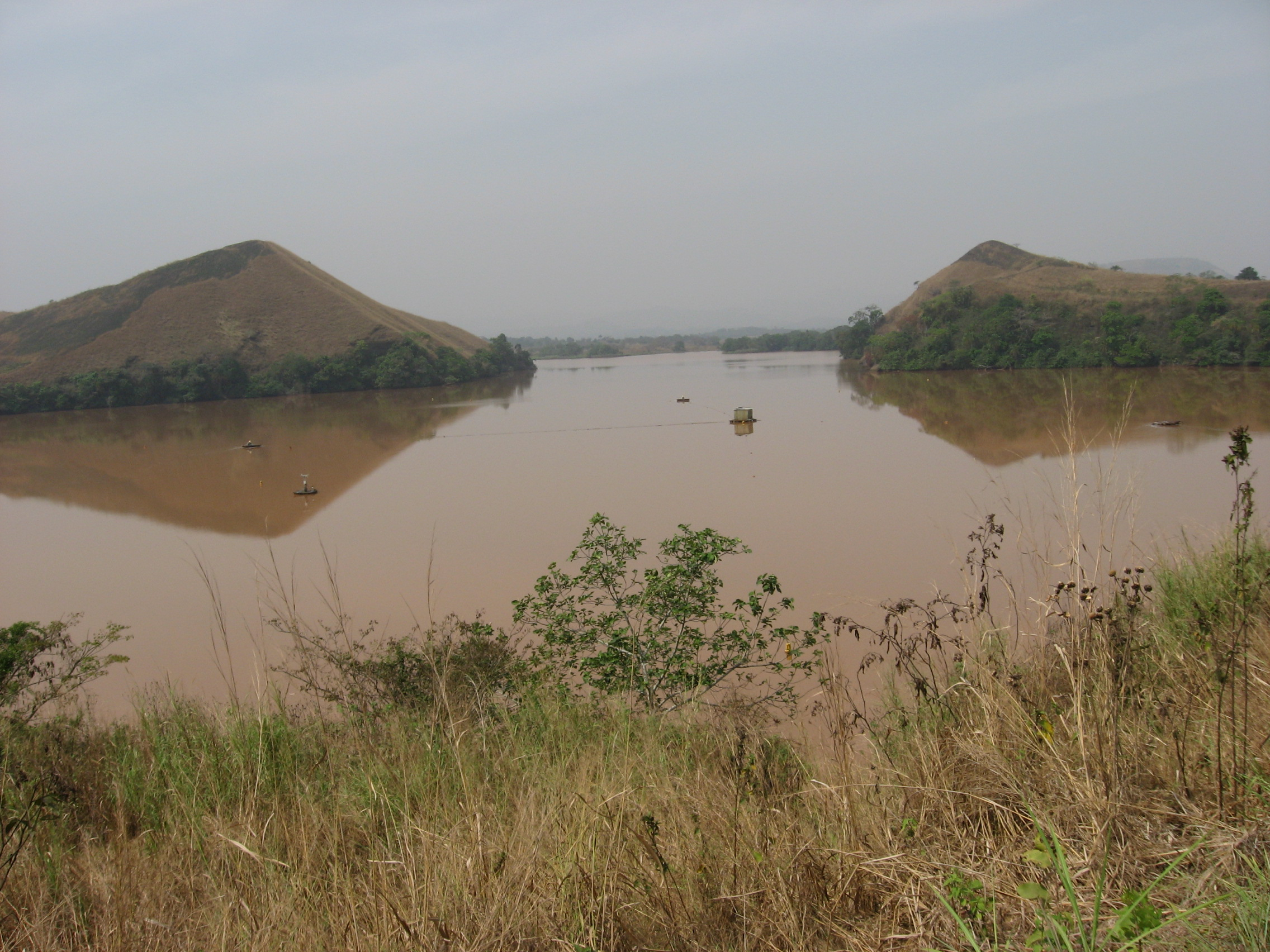
Lake Monoun

On August 15, 1984, Lake Monoun exploded in a limnic eruption that released enormous amounts of carbon dioxide, suffocating 37 people to death. On August 21, 1986, another limnic eruption at Lake Nyos killed as many as 1,800 people and 3,500 livestock. The two disasters are the only recorded instances of limnic eruptions, though geologic and sedimentary evidence indicates they may have caused large localized die-offs before historical records began.

=== Brief political loosening ===
Biya had initially seemed supportive of loosening restrictions on civil society, but the coup attempt ended any sign of opening up. However, by 1990, pressure from Western governments was mounting as the end of the Cold War made them less tolerant of authoritarian allies. In December 1990, opposition parties were legalized for the first time since 1966. The first multiparty elections were held in 1992 and were hotly contested. Biya won with 40% of the vote against 36 for his closest competitor and 19 for another opposition party. In Parliament, Biya's ruling party on a plurality with 45% of the votes but failed to obtain a majority. The competitiveness of the election was not to Biya's liking and subsequent elections have been widely criticized by opposition parties and international observers as rigged and suffering from numerous and widespread irregularities. The ruling party has had no trouble gaining large majorities.

Pressure from Anglophone groups in former British Cameroons resulted in changes to the constitution in 1996, which purported to decentralize power but fell short of Anglophone demands to reestablish the federal structure. As a result of continued opposition, many of the changes adopted in 1996 have never been fully implemented and power remains highly centralized in the President.

=== Bakassi border conflict ===
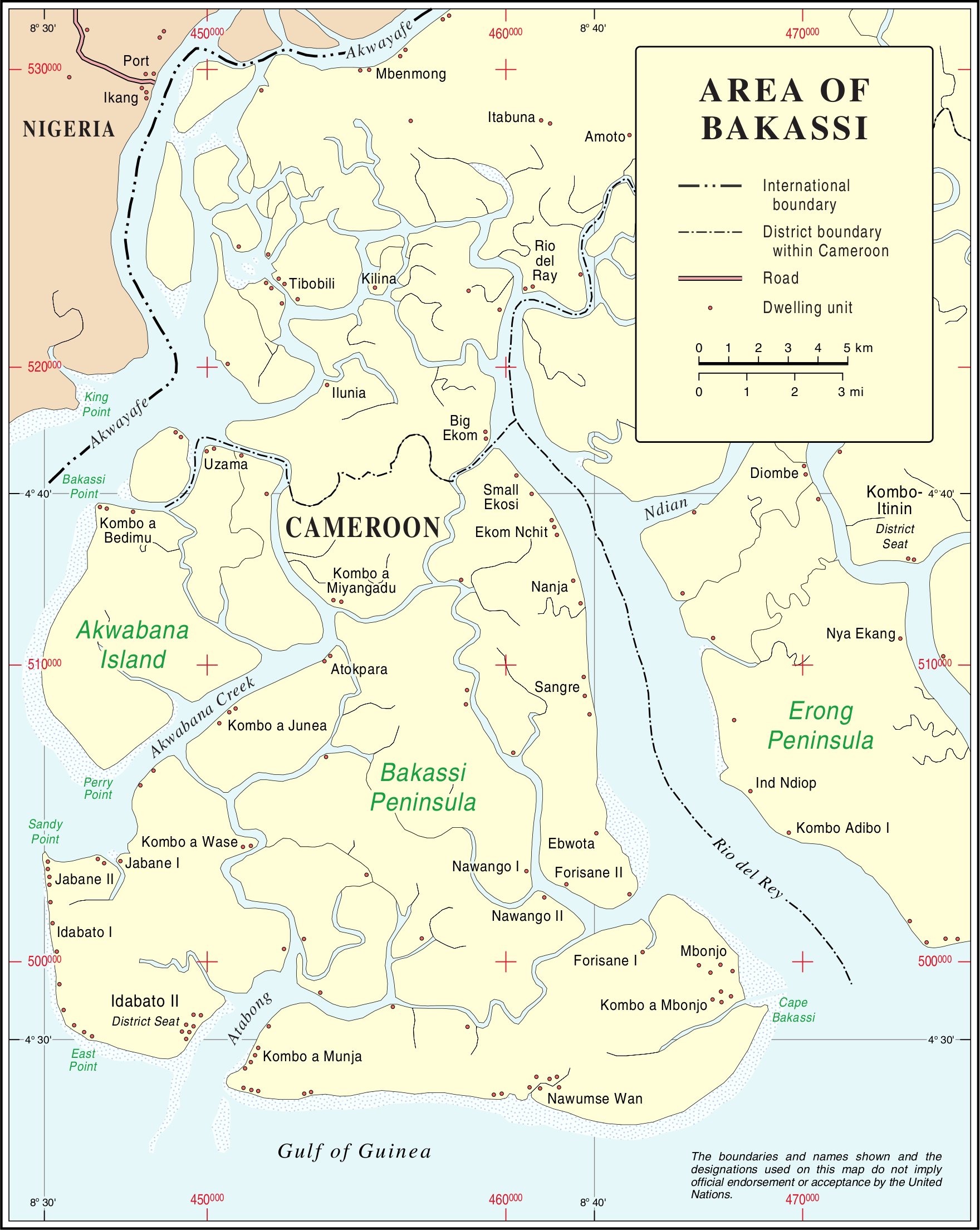
Bakassi Peninsula

Bakassi is a peninsula on the Gulf of Guinea between the Cross River estuary and the Rio del Rey estuary on the east. The area was administered by Nigeria through the colonial era. However, after independence, efforts to demarcate the border revealed that a 1913 agreement between Britain and Germany, placed Bakassi in German Cameroon and accordingly should belong to Cameroon. Nigeria pointed to other colonial-era documents and agreements and their long history of administration to object to this narrative. The competing claims grew contentious after oil was discovered in the region. An agreement between the two countries in 1975 was derailed by a coup in Nigeria. In 1981, clashes between Nigerian and Cameroonian forces resulted in several deaths and nearly led to war between the two nations. The border saw further clashes several times throughout the 1980s. In 1993, the situation worsened with both countries sending large military contingents to the region and numerous reports of skirmishes and attacks against civilians. On 29 March 1994, Cameroon referred the matter to the International Court of Justice (ICJ).

In October 2002, the International Court of Justice ruled in favor of Cameroon. However, the ruling was resisted by Nigeria. Pressure from the UN and international community and the threat of withdrawal of foreign aid ultimately forced Nigeria to acquiesce and in 2006 the Greentree Agreement laid out a plan for the transfer of administration over two years. The transfer was successfully accomplished but many inhabitants of the peninsula retained their Nigerian citizenship and remain dissatisfied with the transition. Low-level violence continued until it was subsumed in the Anglophone Crisis in 2017.

=== 2008 protests ===
In February 2008, Cameroon experienced widespread violent unrest as a strike by transport workers opposing high fuel prices and poor working conditions coincided with President Paul Biya's announcement that he wanted the constitution to be amended to remove term limits. Biya was scheduled to leave power at the end of his term in 2011. After several days of widespread rioting, looting, and reports of gunfire in all the major cities, calm was eventually restored after a crackdown with thousands arrested, and at least several dozen killed. The government announced lower fuel prices, increased wages for the military and civil servants, and decreased duties on key foodstuffs and construction materials. Many opposition groups reported additional harassment and restrictions on speech, gatherings, and political activity in the wake of the protests. Ultimately, the constitutional term limits were revoked and Biya was reelected in 2011 in an election criticized by the opposition and international observers as plagued by irregularities and low turnout.

== Contemporary issues ==
=== Boko Haram ===
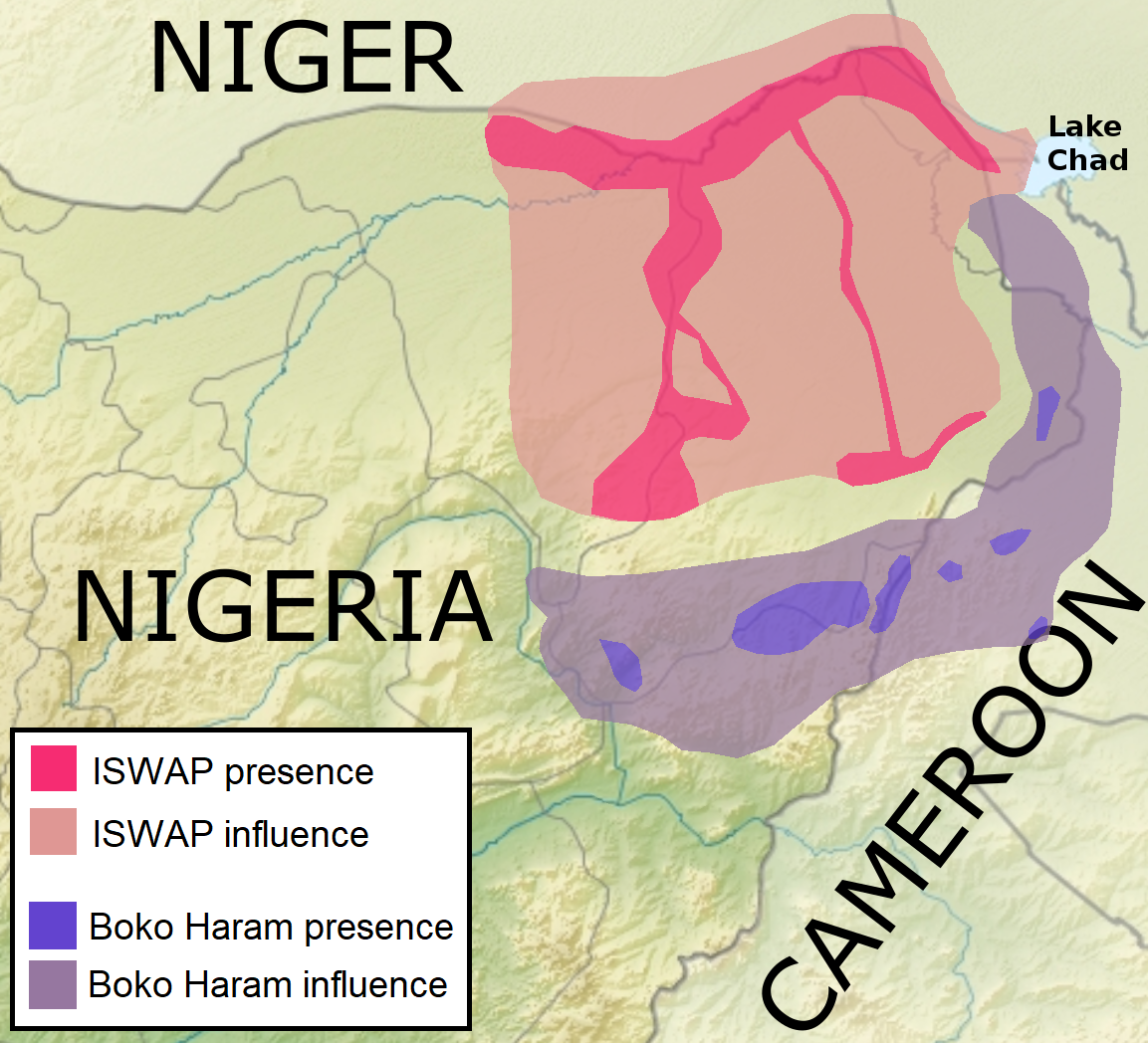
Map of Boko Haram impacted areas including northern Cameroon

In 2014, the Boko Haram insurgency spread into Cameroon from Nigeria. In May 2014, in the wake of the Chibok schoolgirls kidnapping, Presidents Paul Biya of Cameroon and Idriss Déby of Chad announced they were waging war on Boko Haram, and deployed troops to the Northern Nigerian border. Cameroon announced in September 2018 that Boko Haram had been repelled, but the conflict persists in the northern border areas nonetheless.

=== Anglophone Crisis ===
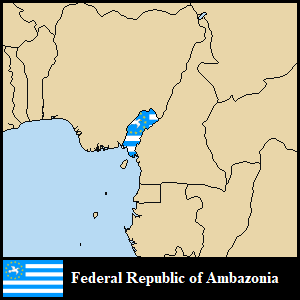
Anglophone regions claimed by separatists as Ambazonia

In November 2016, major protests broke out in the Anglophone regions of Cameroon. In September 2017, the protests and the government's response to them escalated into an armed conflict, with separatists declaring the independence of Ambazonia and starting a guerilla war against the Cameroonian Army.

== Football ==
Cameroon has received some international attention following the relative success of its football team. The team has qualified for the FIFA World Cup eight times, more than any other African team. However, the team has only made it out of the group stage once, in 1990, when they became the first African team to reach the quarter-final of the World Cup. They have also won five Africa Cup of Nations.

== See also ==
- Ambazonia
- History of Africa
- Politics of Cameroon
- List of heads of government of Cameroon
- List of heads of state of Cameroon
- Douala history and timeline
- Yaoundé history and timeline

== Notes ==
=== Works cited ===
- DeLancey, Mark W.; DeLancey, Mark Dike (2000). Historical Dictionary of the Republic of Cameroon (3rd ed.). Scarecrow Press. ISBN 978-0-8108-3775-1.
- Hudgens, Jim; Trillo, Richard (1999). The Rough Guide to West Africa (3rd ed.). Rough Guides.
- Walker, Robin (2011). When We Ruled: The Ancient and Mediæval History of Black Civilisations. Black Classic Press. ISBN 978-1-58073-045-7.
