= Southern Cameroons =

1916–1961 British mandate in west-central Africa

- Part of the British Cameroons
- 1916–1961
- Flag Coat of arms

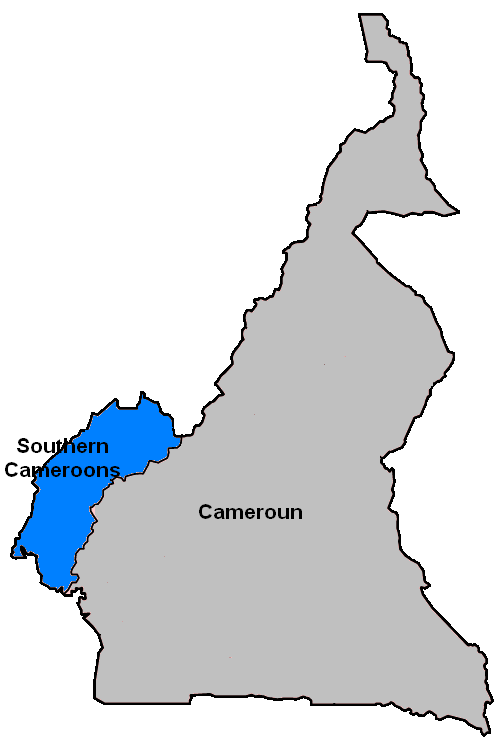
- The Southern Cameroons now constitute the Southwest Region and Northwest Region.
- Capital: Buea
- Area
  - 1987: 42,710 km^{2} (16,490 sq mi)
- Population
  - 1987: 2,100,000
- History
  - British Mandate: 1916
  - Federated with French Cameroons: 1 October 1961
Preceded by	Succeeded by
Kamerun	West Cameroon
- Today part of: Cameroon

The Southern Cameroons was the southern part of the British League of Nations mandate territory of the British Cameroons in West Africa. Since 1961, it has been part of the Republic of Cameroon, where it makes up the Northwest Region and Southwest Region. Since 1994, pressure groups in the territory claim there was no legal document (treaty of union) in accordance to UNGA RES 1608(XV) paragraph 5, and are seeking to restore statehood and independence from the Republic. They renamed the British Southern Cameroons as Ambazonia (from Ambas Bay).

== History ==
=== League of Nations mandate ===
Following the Treaty of Versailles, the German territory of Kamerun was divided on 28 June 1919, between a French and a British League of Nations mandate, the French, who had previously administered the whole occupied territory, getting the larger. The French mandate was known as Cameroun. The British mandate comprised two adjacent territories, Northern Cameroons and Southern Cameroons. They were administered from, but not joined to, the British territory of Nigeria through the British Resident (although some incumbents had the rank of District Officer, Senior Resident or Deputy Resident) with headquarters in Buea.

Applying the principle of indirect rule, the British allowed native authorities to administer populations according to their own traditions. These also collected taxes, which were then paid over to the British. The British devoted themselves to trade and to exploiting mining resources of the territory. South Cameroons students, including Emmanuel Mbela Lifafa Endeley, created the Cameroons Youth League (CYL) on 27 March 1940, to oppose what they saw as the exploitation of their country.

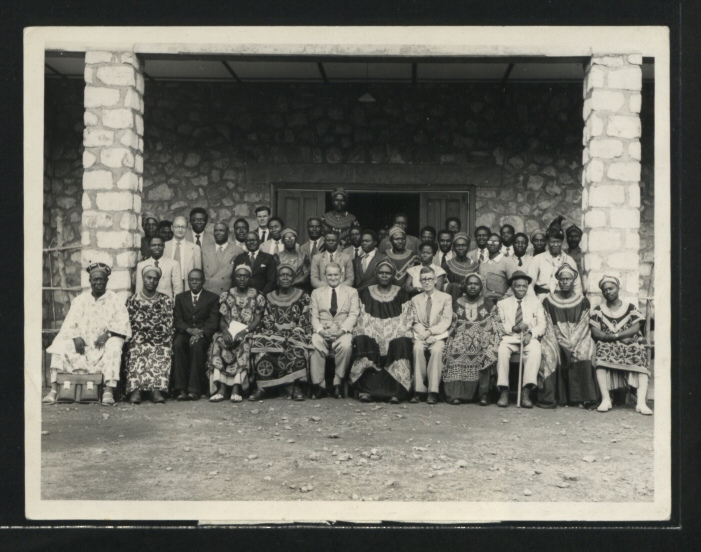
Delegates to the Bamenda conference on the future constitution of Southern Cameroons in front of the Bamenda social centre in May 1956.

=== Trust territory ===
When the League of Nations ceased to exist in 1946, most of the mandate territories were reclassified as UN trust territories, henceforth administered through the UN Trusteeship Council. The object of trusteeship was to prepare the lands for eventual independence. The United Nations approved the Trusteeship Agreements for British Cameroons to be governed by Britain on 6 December 1946.

Southern Cameroons was divided in 1949 into two provinces: Bamenda (capital Bamenda, hence also thus named) and Southern (capital Buea). Yet the residential type of administration was continued with a single British Resident at Buea, but in 1949 Edward John Gibbons was appointed Special Resident, and on 1 October 1954, when political power shifted to the elected government, succeeded himself as first of only two commissioners.

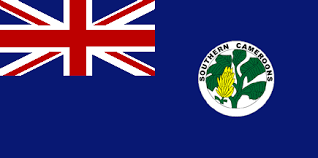
Temporary Flag of British Southern Cameroons after its separation from Nigeria.

Following the Ibadan General Conference of 1950, a new constitution for Nigeria devolved more power to the regions. In the subsequent election thirteen Southern Cameroonian representatives were elected to the Eastern Nigerian House of Assembly in Enugu. In 1953, however, the Southern Cameroons representatives, unhappy with the domineering attitude of Nigerian politicians and lack of unity among the ethnic groups in the Eastern Region, declared a "benevolent neutrality" and withdrew from the assembly. At a conference in London from 30 July to 22 August 1953, the Southern Cameroons delegation asked for a separate region of its own. The British agreed, and Southern Cameroons became an autonomous region with its capital still at Buea. Elections were held in 1954 and the parliament met on 1 October 1954, with E.M.L. Endeley as Premier. As Cameroun and Nigeria prepared for Independence, South Cameroons nationalists debated whether their best interests lay with union with Cameroun, union with Nigeria or total independence. Endeley was defeated in elections on 1 February 1959 by John Ngu Foncha.

Referendums were held in 1959 and 1961 in the Cameroons to determine union with Nigeria or Cameroun. In 1961, Northern Cameroons voted for union with Nigeria and Southern Cameroons for union with (the formerly French) Cameroun.

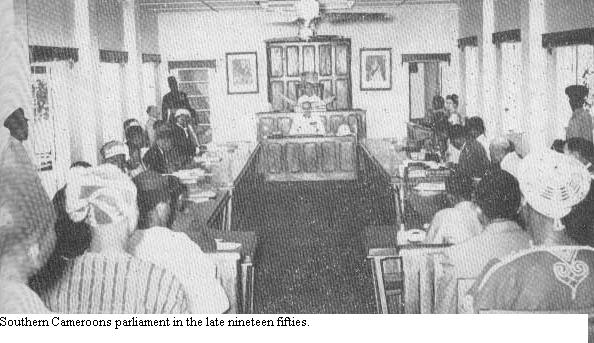
Southern Cameroons Regional Assembly in 1958.

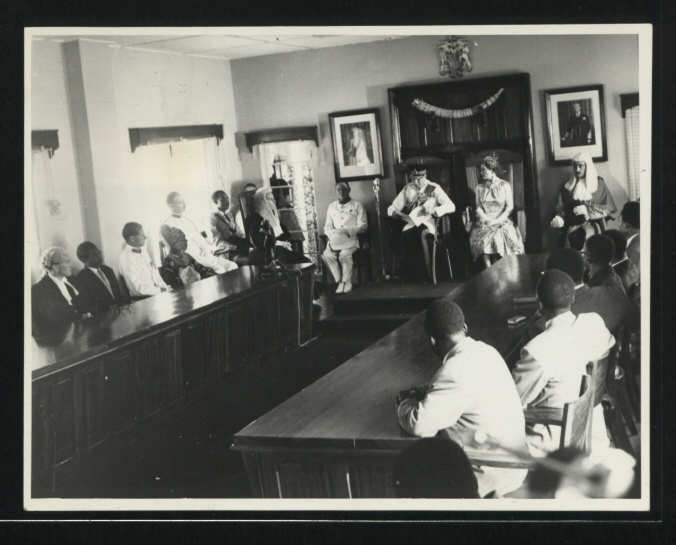
Prince Henry, Duke of Gloucester and his spouse Princess Alice, Duchess of Gloucester in Buea, 1959.

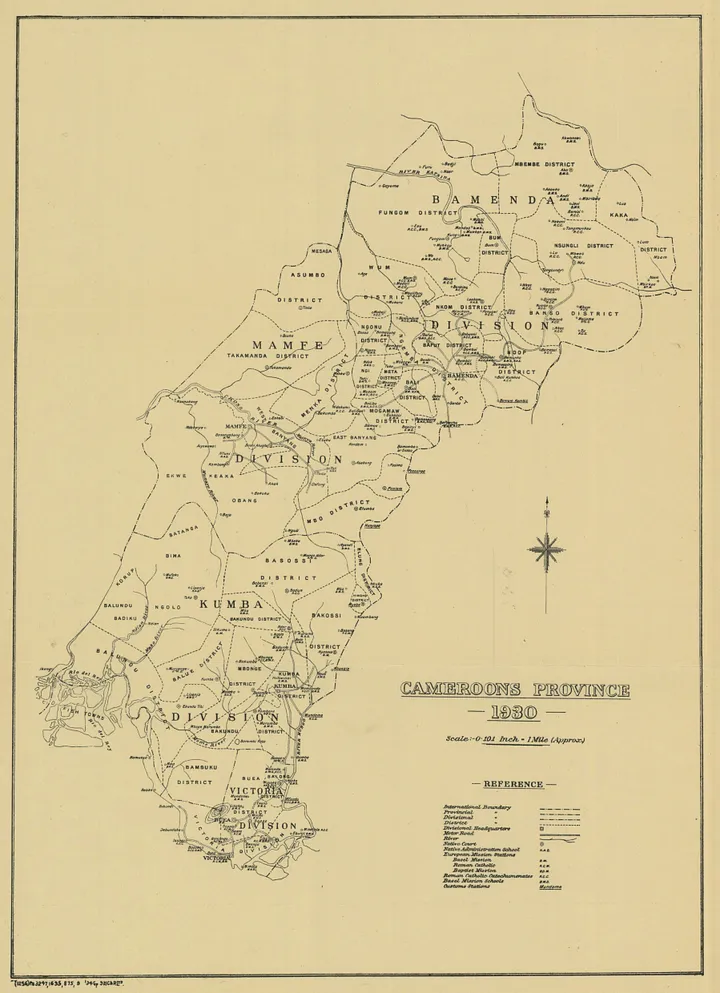
Map of the Southern Cameroons consisting of 4 Divisions (1930): Victoria, Kumba, Mamfe and Bamenda.

=== Integration into Cameroon ===
Despite being united, the Anglophones in Cameroon did not feel represented in government politics. In 1993, the All Anglophone Conference argued at their meeting that "the 1961 Foumban Accord. . .was hardly represented by the Francophone majority who ultimately scrapped the Federal Constitution and replaced it with a Unitary Constitution." The Foumban Accord "was the basis of Cameroon's post-independence Federal Constitution".

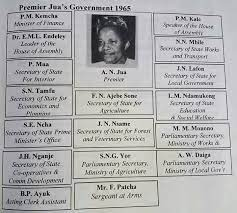
Augustine N. Jua's cabinet, 1965.

=== Ambazonian independence movement ===
Flag of the Ambazonian independence movement.

Southern Cameroons became part of Cameroon on 1 October 1961. Foncha served as Prime Minister of West Cameroun and vice-president of the Federal Republic of Cameroun. However, the English-speaking peoples of the Southern Cameroons (now West Cameroun) did not believe that they were fairly treated by the French-speaking government of the country. Following a referendum on 20 May 1972, a new constitution was adopted in Cameroun which replaced the federal state with a unitary state. Southern Cameroons lost its autonomous status and became the Northwest Province and Southwest Province of the Republic of Cameroun. The Southern Cameroonians felt further marginalised. Groups such as the Cameroon Anglophone Movement (CAM) demanded greater autonomy, or independence, for the provinces.

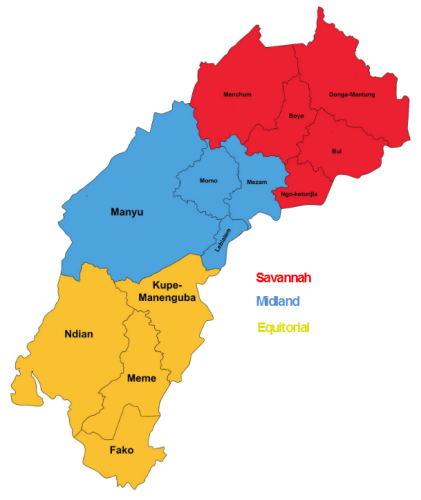
States and Counties of Ambazaonia. Proposed by the Ambazonian IG.

Pro-independence groups claim that UN Resolution 1608 21 April 1961, which required the UK, the Government of the Southern Cameroons and Republic of Cameroun to engage in talks with a view to agreeing measures for union of the two countries, was not implemented, and that the Government of the United Kingdom was negligent in terminating its trusteeship without ensuring that proper arrangements were made. They say that the adoption of a federal constitution by Cameroun on 1 September 1961 constituted annexation of the Southern Cameroons.

Representatives of Anglophone groups convened the first All Anglophone Conference (AAC1) in Buea from 2 April to 3 April 1993. The conference issued the "Buea Declaration", which called for constitutional amendments to restore the 1961 federation. This was followed by the second All Anglophone Conference (AAC2) in Bamenda in 1994. This conference issued the "Bamenda Declaration", which stated that if the federal state was not restored within a reasonable time, Southern Cameroons would declare its independence. The AAC was renamed the Southern Cameroons Peoples Conference (SCPC), and later the Southern Cameroons Peoples Organisation (SCAPO), with the Southern Cameroons National Council (SCNC) as the executive governing body. Younger activists formed the Southern Cameroons Youth League (SCYL) in Buea on 28 May 1995. The SCNC sent a delegation, led by John Foncha, to the United Nations, which was received on 1 June 1995 and presented a petition against the 'annexation' of the Southern Cameroons by French Cameroun. This was followed by a signature referendum the same year, which the organisers claim produced a 99% vote in favour of independence with 315,000 people voting.

Armed members of the SCNC took over the Buea radio station in Southwest Province on the night of 30 December 1999 and in the early hours of 31 December broadcast a tape of a proclamation of independence read by Judge Ebong Frederick Alobwede.

Amnesty International has accused the Cameroun authorities of violations of human rights against Southern Cameroons activists.

Southern Cameroons, since then renamed to Ambazonia, is a member of the Unrepresented Nations and Peoples Organization (UNPO) since 2005 and a charter member of the Organization of Emerging African States (OEAS).

Counties of Ambazonia
County	Capital	Area (km^{2})
Fako	Victoria	2,093
Meme	Kumba	3,105
Ndian	Mundemba	6,626
Kupenguba	Bangem	3,404
Lebialem	Menji	617
Manyu	Mamfe	9,565
Momo	Mbengwi	1,792
Mezam	Bamenda	1,745
Ngo-Ketundjia	Ndop	1,126
Builand	Kumbo	2,297
Boyo	Fundong	1,592
Menchum	Wum	4,469
Mantungia	Nkambe	4,279

State	Capital	Area (km^{2})	Population (2015)
Equatoria (Atlantic)	Kumba	15,228	2,618,138
Midland	Widikum	13,719	2,454,795
Savannah	Kumbo	13,763	2,733,032
F.R.A.	Buea	42, 710	7,805,965

==== Complaint with the African Commission on Human and Peoples Rights ====
On 9 January 2003, the SCNC and SCAPO filed a complaint with the African Commission on Human and Peoples' Rights against the Republic of Cameroun. Among other allegations, the complainants alleged that the Republic of Cameroun is illegally occupying the territory of Southern Cameroons. The Complainants alleged that the Republic of Cameroon has violated Articles 2, 3, 4, 5, 6, 7(1), 9, 10, 11, 12, 13, 17(1), 19, 20, 21, 22, 23(1), 24 of the African Charter. The SCNC and SCAPO ultimately seek the independence of the territory of Southern Cameroons. In a decision reached at its 45th Ordinary Session on 27 May 2009, the African Commission on Human and Peoples' Rights found that the Republic of Cameroun has violated Articles 1, 2, 4, 5, 6, 7(1), 10, 11, 19 and 26 the Charter. The Human Rights Commission determined that Articles 12, 13, 17(1), 20, 21, 22, 23(1) and 24 have not been violated.

The Human Rights Commission further recognized that under the African Charter and broad international law, Southern Cameroons meets the definition of a "people" under international law "because they manifest numerous characteristics and affinities, which include a common history, linguistic tradition, territorial connection, and political outlook". The Human Rights Commission declared itself incompetent rationae temporis, to rule on allegations that occurred prior to 18 December 1989, date on which the African Charter came into force for the Respondent State (Republic of Cameroun). Hence, the Human Rights Commission declared itself incompetent to rule on the complainants' allegations with respect to events that occurred from the 1961 United Nations plebiscite to 1972 when the Federal and Union Constitutions were adopted to form the United Republic of Cameroon during which the Complainants claim the Respondent State (Republic of Cameroun) "...established its colonial rule there, complete with its structures, and its administrative, military and police personnel, applying a system and operating in a language alien to the Southern Cameroon." The Human Rights Commission stated, however, that, if the Complainants can establish that any violation committed before 18 December 1989 continued thereafter, then the Commission shall have competence to examine it.

The Human Rights Commission addressed the question, whether the people of Southern Cameroons are entitled to the right to self-determination contextualizing the question by dealing, not with the 1961 UN Plebiscite, or the 1972 Unification, but rather the events of 1993 and 1994 on the constitutional demands vis-à-vis the claim for the right to self-determination of the Southern Cameroonian people. The Human Rights Commission stated that to invoke Self Determination as prescribed by Article 20 the African Charter, the Complainant must satisfy the Commission that the two conditions under Article 20(2), namely oppression and domination have been met. Based on events that occurred after 18 December 1989, the Human Rights Commission noted that the Complainants have not demonstrated if these conditions have been met to warrant invoking the right to self-determination. The Human Rights Commission also noted that in their submission, the Respondent State (Republic of Cameroun) implicitly accepted that self-determination may be exercisable by the Complainants on condition that they establish cases of massive violations of human rights or denial of participation in public affairs.

The Human Rights Commission noted that autonomy within a sovereign state is acceptable, in the context of self-government, confederacy, or federation while preserving the territorial integrity of a State party, can be exercised under the African Charter.

The Human Rights Commission recommended that the Respondent State (Republic of Cameroun) should among other things enter into constructive dialogue with the Complainants, and in particular SCNC and SCAPO, to resolve the constitutional issues, as well as grievances.

=== Bakassi Peninsula ===
Following the International Court of Justice ruling of 10 October 2002 that sovereignty over the Bakassi peninsula rested with Cameroon, SCAPO claimed that Bakassi was, in fact, part of the territory of Southern Cameroons. In 2002, SCAPO took the Nigerian government to the Federal High Court in Abuja to require it to take a case before the International Court of Justice to establish the right of the people of the Southern Cameroons to self-determination. The court ruled in their favour on 5 March 2002. On 14 August 2006, Nigeria handed over the Bakassi peninsula to Cameroon. SCAPO responded by proclaiming the independence of the Republic of Ambazonia, to include the territory of Bakassi.

== Leadership ==
No.	Portrait	Name (Birth–Death)	Election	Term of office			Political party	President
No.	Portrait	Name (Birth–Death)	Election	Took office	Left office	Time in office	Political party	President
Premier of British Southern Cameroons
1		E. M. L. Endeley (1916–1988)	1957	1 October 1954	1 February 1959	4 years, 153 days	KNC	
2		John Ngu Foncha (1916–1999)	1959	1959	1 October 1961	2 years, 212 days	KNDP	
Prime Minister of West Cameroon (Federal Republic of Cameroon)
1		John Ngu Foncha (1916–1999)	1964	1 October 1961	13 May 1965	3 years, 224 days	KNDP	Ahidjo
2		Augustine Ngom Jua (1929–1977)	—	13 May 1965	1 September 1966	2 years, 243 days	KNDP	Ahidjo
(2)		Augustine Ngom Jua (1929–1977)	—	1 September 1966	11 January 1968	2 years, 243 days	UNC	Ahidjo
3		Salomon Tandeng Muna (1912–2002)	1970	11 January 1968	2 June 1972	4 years, 143 days	UNC	Ahidjo

== List of Parties ==
- KNDP
- KNC
- KPP
- CPNC
- OK Party
- UPC
- Cameroon United Congress (CUC)

== See also ==
- Ambazonia
- West Cameroon
- AmbaCoin
- Anglophone Cameroonian
- Bakassi
- Biafra
- President of Ambazonia

== Sources and external links ==
- SCNC official website
- WorldStatesmen - Cameroon
