= 1961 West Cameroon parliamentary election =

- 30 December 1961
Party	Leader	Vote %	Seats	+/–
KNDP	John Ngu Foncha	54.94	24	+10
CNPC	E. M. L. Endeley	26.80	10	−2
OK	Ndeh Ntumazah	6.94	1	+1
Independents	–	10.76	2	+2
This lists parties that won seats. See the complete results below.
Prime Minister before	Prime Minister after
John Ngu Foncha; KNDP	John Ngu Foncha; KNDP

Parliamentary elections were held in West Cameroon on 30 December 1961. The result was a victory for the Kamerun National Democratic Party, which won 24 of the 37 seats in the House of Assembly.

== Results ==
Party	Votes	%	Seats	+/–
Kamerun National Democratic Party	140,347	54.94	24	+10
Cameroon People's National Convention	68,458	26.80	10	–2
One Kamerun	17,733	6.94	1	+1
Other parties	1,401	0.55	0	New
Independents	27,494	10.76	2	+2
Total	255,433	100.00	37	+11
Source: Nohlen et al.
