= Paul Monyonge Kale =

Cameroonian politician

Paul Monyonge Kale (1910–1966) was a leading politician of the pre-independence era in Southern Cameroons and speaker of the West Cameroon House of Assembly until his death in 1966. Much of his adult life was spent in the pursuit of Cameroon independence.

== Biography ==
=== Early life ===
Born 20 March 1910, in Buea, Kale did his primary education in Buea before continuing his secondary education in Normal College, Kake (near Kumba). After this he worked as a teacher in Buea for a few years.

=== Adult life ===
In April 1935 he moved to Lagos working as Supervisor of the Salvation Army Schools and also working for the magazine the West African Pilot. Through his journalism he quickly became caught up in activism. He was a founding member of the Cameroon Welfare Union (CWU), joined the National Council of Nigeria and Cameroons (NCNC), and also cofounded the Cameroon Youth League (CYL) and the Cameroons National Federation (CNF). He was also involved in the founding of the Bakweri Union and the Bamenda Improvement Association. In 1949 he was part of the pan-Nigerian delegation to London.

In 1953, Kale returned to Southern Cameroons where with Nerius N. Mbile he created the Kamerun People's Party (KPP). In 1959 Kale left the KPP and founded the Kamerun United Party (KUP), which advocated the independence of British Cameroons as a separate political entity. Later, in 1960 the KPP merged with the Kamerun National Congress (KNC) to form the opposition coalition, the Cameroon People's National Convention (CNPC). He served as the speaker of the West Cameroon House of Assembly, 1961–1966.

== Published works ==
His book, ‘Political Evolution in the Cameroons’, was published posthumously in August 1967.

An earlier book by Kale about the Bakweri had been published in 1939. Edwin Ardener discussed this in his "Kingdom on Mount Cameroon" book already cited.
