= 1957 Southern Cameroons parliamentary election =

Parliamentary elections were held in Southern Cameroons in March 1957. The Kamerun National Congress emerged as the largest party, winning six of the 13 seats in the House of Assembly.

== Results ==
| Party | Votes | % | Seats |
|---|---|---|---|
| Kamerun National Congress | 35,626 | 45.42 | 6 |
| Kamerun National Democratic Party | 17,937 | 22.87 | 5 |
| Kamerun People's Party | 15,436 | 19.68 | 2 |
| Union of the Peoples of Cameroon | 9,440 | 12.03 | 0 |
| Total | 78,439 | 100.00 | 13 |
| Registered voters/turnout | 102,944 | – | |
Source: Sternberger et al.
