= 1964 Cameroonian parliamentary election =

- 24 April 1964
- All 50 seats in the National Assembly; 25 seats needed for a majority
Party	Leader	Vote %	Seats
Cameroonian Union	Ahmadou Ahidjo	82.98	40
KNDP	John Ngu Foncha	8.55	10
This lists parties that won seats. See the complete results below.
Prime Minister before	Prime Minister after
Charles Assalé; Cameroonian Union	Charles Assalé; Cameroonian Union

Parliamentary elections were held in Cameroon on 24 April 1964. They were the first elections held after Southern Cameroons (also known as West Cameroon) became part of the country in 1961. The result was a victory for the Cameroonian Union (UC), which won 40 of the 50 seats. The UC and the Cameroonian Party of Democrats only contested the 40 seats East Cameroon, while the Kamerun National Democratic Party and Cameroon People's National Convention contested the ten seats in West Cameroon. The elections were marred by severe irregularities.

== Results ==
Party	Votes	%	Seats
Cameroonian Union	1,863,614	82.98	40
Kamerun National Democratic Party	192,081	8.55	10
Cameroonian Party of Democrats	129,571	5.77	0
Cameroon People's National Convention	60,485	2.69	0
Total	2,245,751	100.00	50
Total votes	2,259,658	–	
Source: Nohlen et al.
