= E. M. L. Endeley =

Cameroonian politician

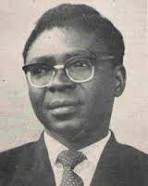
- Endeley visiting Bamenda

Premier of Southern Cameroons
- In office 26 October 1954 – 1 February 1959
- Preceded by: Office established
- Succeeded by: John Ngu Foncha

Personal details
- Born: Emmanuel Mbela Lifafa Endeley; April 10, 1916 Buea, Kamerun
- Died: June 1988
- Profession: Physician, politician

Emmanuel Mbela Lifafa Endeley, OBE (10 April 1916 – June 1988) was a Cameroonian politician who led Southern Cameroonian representatives out of the Eastern Nigerian House of Assembly in Enugu and negotiated the creation of the autonomous region of Southern Cameroons in 1954.

== Early career and activism ==
Endeley was born on 10 April 1916 to Mathias Lifafa and Mariana Mojoko Endeley; his family were wealthy members of the Bakweri ethnic group and his father was a chief of Bakweri. Endeley was born in Buea then under the Colony of German Kamerun until administrative control was divided between the French and British after the Treaty of Versailles was signed. He was educated at a newly created British government school in Buea and then proceeded to a Catholic Mission School in Bonjongo both in British Southern Cameroons. Endeley completed his secondary education at Government College, Umuahia in Nigeria. His initial intention was to enroll at Yaba Higher College to study agriculture but then turned his attention to medicine, later earning a government scholarship to study at the Nigerian School of Medicine in Yaba in 1935. In 1942, he joined the colonial service and took the post of assistant medical officer with his own district, in 1945, he served as chief medical officer in Buea, he also served in a similar capacity in Lagos and Port Harcourt. In 1946, his medical license was suspended after a professional charge was brought against him, Azikiwe and NCNC in which the youth league was aligned fought against the charges and Endeley gained back his license in 1950 and he returned to practice medicine privately.

Endeley was concerned with providing a voice for workers in British Southern Cameroons and for citizens of that territory in general. As a medical student in 1939, he helped form the Cameroon Youth League (CYL) in Lagos and became its General Secretary. In 1944, he was a founding member of the Bakweri Improvement Union. In 1946, after the United Nations approved a British trusteeship for Eastern Cameroon, a development corporation was established to stimulate growth in agricultural produce. When Endeley returned to British Cameroons, he joined union organisers of the Cameroon Development Corporation (CDC) in Southern Cameroons. A trained medical officer, Endeley was new to union politics when he joined the Cameroon Development Corporation Worker's Union but he studied labour regulations and was able to build the union to a formidable strength. He became union secretary the following year and was union president in 1949. Endeley organised and participated in petitioning United Nations delegations and in organising general strikes. He was a founder of the Cameroons National Federation (CNF) in 1949 and later served as its president. CNF was later known as Cameroons National Congress. A biographical sketch is given in Njeuma 1999

== Political career ==
Endeley was a delegate to the constitutional conference at Ibadan that introduced a new constitution, permitted elections into legislative seats and approved African nominees to a Council of Ministers. When elections were conducted in British Cameroons, Endeley led Cameroons National Congress won the plurality of votes in the area. In 1951, Endeley was elected to the Eastern Nigerian Assembly in Enugu. Endeley was nominated to the Council of Ministers in 1952 as a minister without portfolio, between 1953 and 1954, he was the Minister of Labour.

He worked to have Southern Cameroons granted special regional status apart from Nigeria; when the Southern Cameroons Regional Assembly was formed, he was one of its first members. In 1953, Endeley joined John Ngu Foncha and Solomon Tandeng Muna in breaking from the National Council of Nigeria and the Cameroons (NCNC) to form the Kamerun National Congress (KNC), which advocated autonomy for Southern Cameroons. In 1954, British Cameroons became a federal territory with its own House of Assembly and executive council.

However, Endeley's political views changed, and he advocated greater integration of the territory with Nigeria. In 1955, Foncha and Muna broke with the KNC to form the separatist Kamerun National Democratic Party (KNDP). Endeley allied the KNC with the Kamerun People's Party (KPP), another pro-Nigeria group, but the coalition lost seats to the KNDP.

In 1957, Endeley squeaked out a victory to become the first Prime Minister of Southern Cameroons; he was installed the following year. The following January, voters replaced Endeley with Foncha. In May 1960, his KNC merged with the KPP to form the Cameroon People's National Convention (CPNC) to be the main opposition party to Foncha's KNDP. Political opinion was strongly in favour of reunification with French Cameroun, and the United Nations held a plebiscite over the issue on 11 February 1961. Endeley and the CPNC opposed; Endeley released a lengthy pamphlet urging the people of Southern Cameroons to vote "no". Nevertheless, the vote came in favour of reunification.

In the new federal state of Cameroon, Endeley and the CPNC took the role of Foncha's main opposition in West Cameroon. Endeley supported President Ahmadou Ahidjo's moves to create a one-party system in Cameroon. He served in several more posts in Cameroon before his death. In 1965, Endeley became leader of government business for West Cameroon. He served as a member of the Cameroon National Union's central committee, and in 1966, he became president of the Fako section, a post he held until 1985. Endeley was also elected to the National Assembly of Cameroon. Endeley died in 1988.
