= 1959 Southern Cameroons parliamentary election =

- 24 January 1959
Party	Leader	Vote %	Seats	+/–
KNDP	John Ngu Foncha	53.42	14	+9
KNC–KPP		37.45	12	+4
This lists parties that won seats. See the complete results below.
Premier before	Premier after
E. M. L. Endeley; KNC	John Ngu Foncha; KNDP

Parliamentary elections were held in Southern Cameroons on 24 January 1959. The result was a victory for the Kamerun National Democratic Party, which won 14 of the 26 seats in the House of Assembly.

== Results ==
Of the twelve seats won by the Kamerun National Congress–Kamerun People's Party alliance, eight were won by the KNC and four by the KPP.

Party	Votes	%	Seats	+/–
Kamerun National Democratic Party	73,305	53.42	14	+9
Kamerun National Congress–Kamerun People's Party	51,384	37.45	12	+4
One Kamerun	2,021	1.47	0	New
Independents	10,509	7.66	0	New
Total	137,219	100.00	26	+13
Registered voters/turnout	205,576	–		
Source: Nohlen et al.
