= Kamerun National Congress =

Southern Cameroons political party

- Abbreviation: KNC
- Leader: E. M. L. Endeley; Salomon Tandeng Muna; John Ngu Foncha; Sampson George
- Founded: 1952
- Dissolved: May 1960
- Merger of: Kamerun United National Congress; Cameroons National Federation
- Merged into: Cameroon People's National Convention

The Kamerun National Congress (KNC) was a political party in Southern Cameroons.

== History ==
The KNC was established in 1952 as a merger of two pro-unification parties, the Kamerun United National Congress and the Cameroons National Federation.

The party's leaders included E. M. L. Endeley, Salomon Tandeng Muna, John Ngu Foncha and Sampson George. However, with Endeley leading the party towards a pro-Nigerian stance, Foncha led a breakaway group to form the Kamerun National Democratic Party (KNDP) in 1955. Another breakaway led to the formation of the Kamerun People's Party (KPP).

The KNC received 45% of the vote in the 1957 parliamentary elections, winning six of the 13 seats and emerging as the largest party in the House of Assembly. The 1959 elections saw the KNC run in an alliance with the KPP. The alliance received 37% of the vote, winning 12 of the 26 seats, of which the KNC took eight. However, the KNDP won the elections with 14 seats.

The KNC and KPP merged in 1960 to form the Cameroon People's National Convention.
