= Kamerun National Democratic Party =

Southern Cameroons political party

- Abbreviation: KNDP
- Founder: John Ngu Foncha
- Founded: 1955
- Dissolved: 1 September 1966
- Split from: Kamerun National Congress
- Merged into: Cameroonian National Union
- Headquarters: Buea

Kamerun National Democratic Party (KNDP) was a pro-independence political party active in Southern Cameroons (now the North West and South West regions of the Republic of Cameroon) during the period of British Mandate rule.

== Pre-independence ==
The KNDP was formed in 1955 by John Ngu Foncha. The party initially sought a close relationship with the Union of the Peoples of Cameroon of Cameroun and in the early days contained a number of UPC members who had fled persecution in the French zone. However whilst Foncha supported autonomy for the South this was rejected by the UPC who wanted full reunification. The KNDP ended their relationship with the UPC in 1957 and the Francophone party were banned in the British territory. The party also split from the Kamerun National Congress (of which Foncha had previously been a member) and the two parties became bitter rivals over the KNC's support for incorporation into Nigeria. The KNDP's stance proved the most popular and they won the legislative elections in 1959, forcing the KNU into opposition. As the governing party they supported a united independent Cameroon but one organised along federal lines and this was endorsed by a referendum in 1961. As a result E. M. L. Endeley's Cameroon People's National Convention (CPNC), which supported the Nigeria, emerged as the main source of opposition to KNDP hegemony, with attempts by the KNDP to absorb the party floundering due to personality clashes.

== Post-independence and merger ==
Following independence, democracy largely receded in Cameroon as the KNDP in what became known as West Cameroon and the Cameroon Union (UC) in East Cameroon established their respective hegemonies. However whilst Ahmadou Ahidjo and the UC enjoyed full control in the East, the KNDP initially did not enjoy the same levels of endorsement, their 78% of the vote in 1964 parliamentary elections some way behind the 98% won by the UC.

Foncha was forced to relinquish his position as Prime Minister of West Cameroon in 1965 when he was elected Vice-President to Ahidjo on a joint ticket as the Constitution of Cameroon stated that both offices could not be held simultaneously. As a consequence Augustine Ngom Jua was chosen as the new prime minister, although not before a round of bitter in-fighting which saw Solomon Tandeng Muna, who had been an important figure in the foundation of the KNDP, split away to form his own Cameroon United Congress (CUC). Initially this put the KNDP in a weaker position, particularly with regards to the UC which was the only effective party in the East. However before long KNDP dominance became as complete when both the CPNC and the CUC were absorbed by the KNDP. Finally the two dominant parties merged into one, the Cameroonian National Union, in 1966 and almost immediately this group became the sole party in a unitary state.

== Attempted revival ==
In 1990 Victorin Hameni Bieleu mooted the possibility of re-establishing the KNDP and contacted Foncha with a view to securing his support. However this did not prove forthcoming and so the plans were shelved in favour of Bieleu forming his own party the Union of Democratic Forces of Cameroon.
