= One Kamerun =

One Kamerun (OK) was a political party in British Cameroons.

== History ==
One Kamerun was established by Ndeh Ntumazah in 1957 after the Union of the Peoples of Cameroon left the territory. Supporting reunification with French Cameroons, it gained support from members of co-operatives, workers, intellectuals and university students.

The party received 1.5% of the vote in the 1959 elections, but failed to win a seat. However, after increasing its vote share to 6.9% in the 1961 elections, it won one of the 37 seats in the House of Representatives.

After unification was achieved in 1961, the party disappeared.

== Bibliography ==
- DeLancey, Mark Dike; Mbuh, Rebecca; DeLancey, Mark Wakeman (2010). Historical Dictionary of the Republic of Cameroon. Scarecrow Press. ISBN 9780810873995.
