= 1959 Northern Cameroons referendum =

Referendum that postponed union with Nigeria

- November 1959
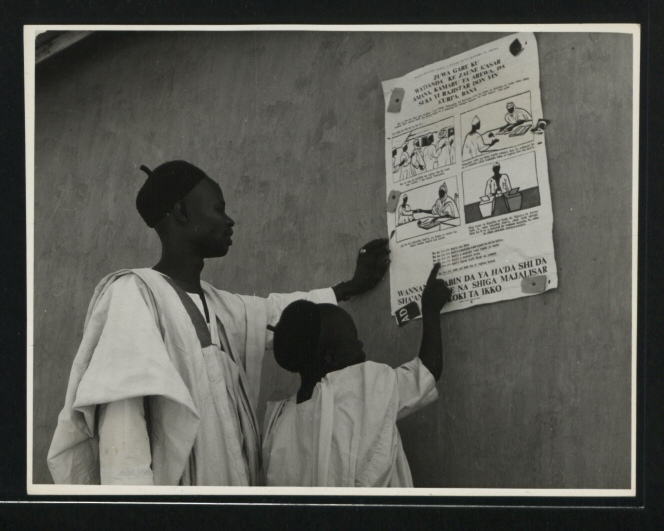
- Poster with referendum instructions

Results
Choice	Votes	%
Postpone decision	70,546	62.25%
Union with Nigeria	42,788	37.75%
Valid votes	113,334	99.54%
Invalid or blank votes	525	0.46%
Total votes	113,859	100.00%
Registered voters/turnout	129,549	87.89%

A referendum on becoming part of Nigeria was held in the Northern Cameroons in November 1959. Voters were given the choice between a union with Nigeria and postponing the decision. Voters favoured the latter, with 62.25% voting to postpone the decision. A second referendum was held in 1961, with 60% voting to join Nigeria and 40% voting to join Cameroon.

== Results ==
Choice	Votes	%
✓ Postpone decision	70,546	62.25
Union with Nigeria	42,788	27.75
Invalid/blank votes	525	–
Total	113,859	100
Registered voters/turnout	129,549	87.9
African Elections Database
