= 1961 British Cameroons referendum =

Referendum that joined British Cameroons to Nigeria and Cameroon

- a) Do you wish to achieve independence by joining the independent Federation of Nigeria or, b) Do you wish to achieve independence by joining the independent Republic of Cameroon?

Northern Cameroons
Federation of Nigeria	59.97%
Republic of Cameroon	40.03%

Southern Cameroons
Federation of Nigeria	29.50%
Republic of Cameroon	70.50%

A United Nations referendum was held in the British Cameroons on 11 February 1961 to determine whether the territory should join neighbouring Cameroon or Nigeria. This followed an earlier plebiscite in the Northern Cameroons in 1959 which voted to postpone a decision. The option of full independence was not on the ballot, having been opposed by Andrew Cohen, the UK representative to the UN Trusteeship Council, as well as African and anti-colonial delegations, notably by E. M. L. Endeley, who favoured independence by joining Nigeria, and John Ngu Foncha, who favoured independence by joining Francophone Cameroon.

The Muslim-majority Northern Cameroons saw a majority of 60% in favour of joining Nigeria, whilst the Christian-majority Southern Cameroons saw 70.5% in favour of joining Cameroon. Northern Cameroon officially became Sardauna Province, a part of the Northern Region of Nigeria, on 1 June, whilst the Southern Cameroons became West Cameroon, one of the two federated states of the Federal Republic of Cameroon, on 1 October.

== Results ==
Choice	Northern Cameroons		Southern Cameroons	
Choice	Votes	%	Votes	%
Independence by joining Cameroon	97,659	40.0	233,571	70.5
Independence by joining Nigeria	146,296	60.0	97,741	29.5
Invalid/blank votes		–		–
Total	243,955	100	331,312	100
Registered voters/turnout	292,985		349,652	
Source: Nohlen et al., African Elections Database
