= West Cameroon =

Cameroonian state (1961–1972)

West Cameroon Cameroun occidental
- State of the Federal Republic of Cameroon
- 1961–1972
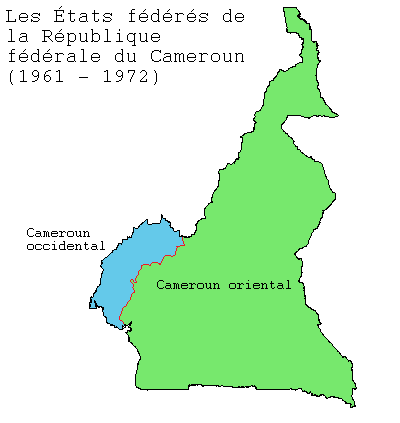
- West Cameroon (blue) within the Federal Republic of Cameroon
- Capital: Buea
- Area
- 42,710 km^{2} (16,490 sq mi)
  - Type: Federated state
- History
  - Established: 1 October 1961
  - Disestablished: 2 June 1972
| Preceded by | Succeeded by |
| Southern Cameroons | Northwest Region; Southwest Region |
- Today part of: Cameroon

West Cameroon (French: Cameroun occidental) was a federated state within the Federal Republic of Cameroon that existed between 1961 and 1972. It was formed on 1 October 1961 when the formerly British-administered Southern Cameroons was integrated into the Republic of Cameroon to form the Federal Republic of Cameroon and abolished on 2 June 1972 when Cameroon became a unitary state. The region now falls within the Northwest Region and Southwest region of Cameroon.

== History ==
The German Empire established the Kamerun protectorate in August 1884. At the conclusion of the First World War, the Treaty of Versailles divided German Kamerun between France and the United Kingdom, with what would become West Cameroon becoming the southern region of British administered Cameroon.

As part of the process of decolonization, voters were asked in a referendum held in 1961 whether they wished to join either Nigeria or Cameroon. With a majority opting to join Cameroon, the British administered Southern Cameroons were integrated into the Republic of Cameroon, which had gained independence from France in the previous year, to form the Federal Republic of Cameroon. West Cameroon was to enjoy autonomy within the federation, with its own legislature and regional government.

Following a referendum held on 20 May 1972, a new constitution came to effect on 2 June 1972, which reconstituted Cameroon as a unitary state. West Cameroon was abolished and replaced by two regions, the Northwest Region and Southwest region.

A nationalist movement, which seeks to establish an independent state, to be known as Ambazonia, exists in the region resulting in an armed conflict breaking out in 2017.

== Governance ==
The constitution of West Cameroon gave the region its own legislature, regional government led by a prime minister, civil service and police force. The federal constitution gave the institutions of West Cameroon executive and legislative competence in all areas not specifically reserved for the federal government.

=== Executive ===
Executive authority was vested in an Executive Council (cabinet) consisting of between 7 and 11 ministers led by a prime minister.

Prime ministers

| No. | Portrait | Name (Birth–Death) | Election | Term of office | | | Political party | President |
| No. | Portrait | Name (Birth–Death) | Election | Took office | Left office | Time in office | Political party | President |
Prime Minister of West Cameroon
| 1 | | John Ngu Foncha (1916–1999) | 1961; 1964 | 1 October 1961 | 13 May 1965 | 3 years, 224 days | KNDP | Ahmadou Ahidjo |
| 2 | | Augustine Ngom Jua (1929–1977) | — | 13 May 1965 | 1 September 1966 | 2 years, 243 days | KNDP | Ahmadou Ahidjo |
| (2) | | Augustine Ngom Jua (1929–1977) | — | 1 September 1966 | 11 January 1968 | 2 years, 243 days | UNC | Ahmadou Ahidjo |
| 3 | | Salomon Tandeng Muna (1912–2002) | 1970 | 11 January 1968 | 2 June 1972 | 4 years, 143 days | UNC | Ahmadou Ahidjo |

Cabinets

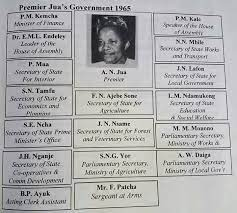
Augustine N. Jua's cabinet in 1965.

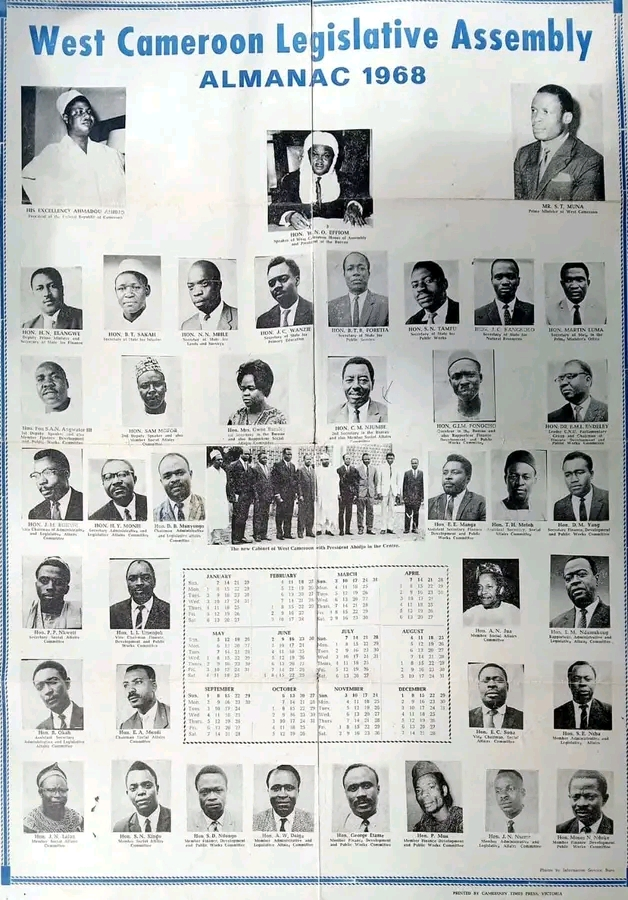
West Cameroon Assembly in 1968.

=== Legislative ===
The legislature of West Cameroon was bicameral, consisting of a 37-member House of Assembly as the lower chamber and a House of Chiefs as the upper chamber.

Speakers of the House of Assembly

| Name | Entered office | Left office |
|---|---|---|
| Paul Monyonge Kale | January 10, 1962 | August 1966 |
| Willie Ndep Orock Effiom | 1968 | 1972 |

== See also ==
- East Cameroon

== Sources ==
- DeLancey, Mark W., and Mark Dike DeLancey (2000): Historical Dictionary of the Republic of Cameroon (3rd ed.). Lanham, Maryland: The Scarecrow Press.
