= Kamerun People's Party =

- Founder: Nerius Mbile; P. M. Kale; Motomby-Woleta
- Founded: 1957
- Dissolved: May 1960
- Split from: Kamerun National Congress
- Merged into: Cameroon People's National Convention

The Kamerun People's Party (KPP) was a political party in British Cameroons.

== History ==
The KPP was established as a breakaway from the Kamerun National Congress (KNC), when a faction led by Nerius Mbile, P. M. Kale, and Motomby-Woleta disagreed with KNC leader E. M. L. Endeley's decision to demand autonomy from the National Council of Nigeria and the Cameroons.

The KPP received 20% of the vote in the 1957 parliamentary elections, winning two of the 13 seats. The 1959 elections saw the KPP run in an alliance with the Kamerun National Congress (KNC). The alliance received 37% of the vote, winning 12 of the 26 seats, of which the KPP took four. However, the KNDP won the elections with 14 seats.

The KPP and KNC merged in 1960 to form the Cameroon People's National Convention.
