= Bonjongo =

Coordinates: 4°03′56″N 9°10′35″E

Bonjongo (Wonjongo) Town is a locality in the Buea Municipality in the Fako Division of the South West Region of Cameroon. This village is currently ruled by HRH Chief Stephen Efesoa

== Overview ==
Bonjongo is a second class chiefdom in the Buea Council Area. It is home to Cameroonians mostly of the Bakweri origin.

== Notable institutions ==
- Presbyterian Church
- G.H.S Bonjongo
- St. Paul's College Bonjongo
