= United Nations trust territories =

Successors to League of Nations mandates

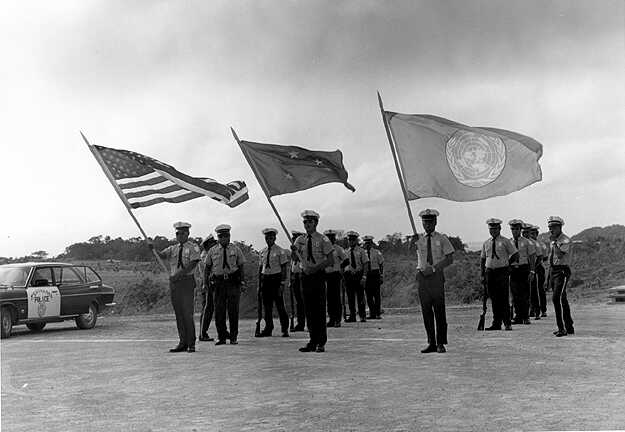
Palau District Police greet the UN Visiting Mission to the Trust Territory of the Pacific Islands (1973).

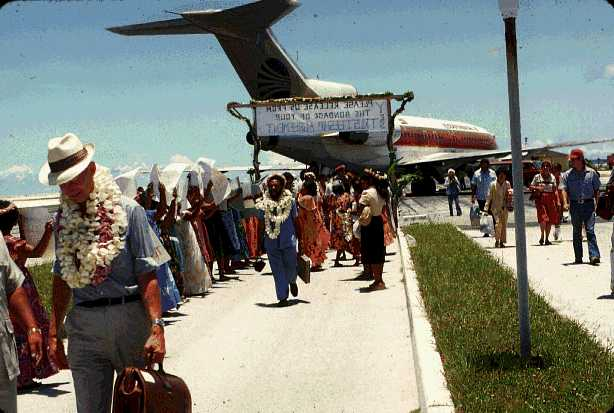
Arrival of UN Visiting Mission in Majuro, Trust Territory of the Pacific Islands (1978). The sign reads "Please release us from the bondage of your trusteeship agreement."

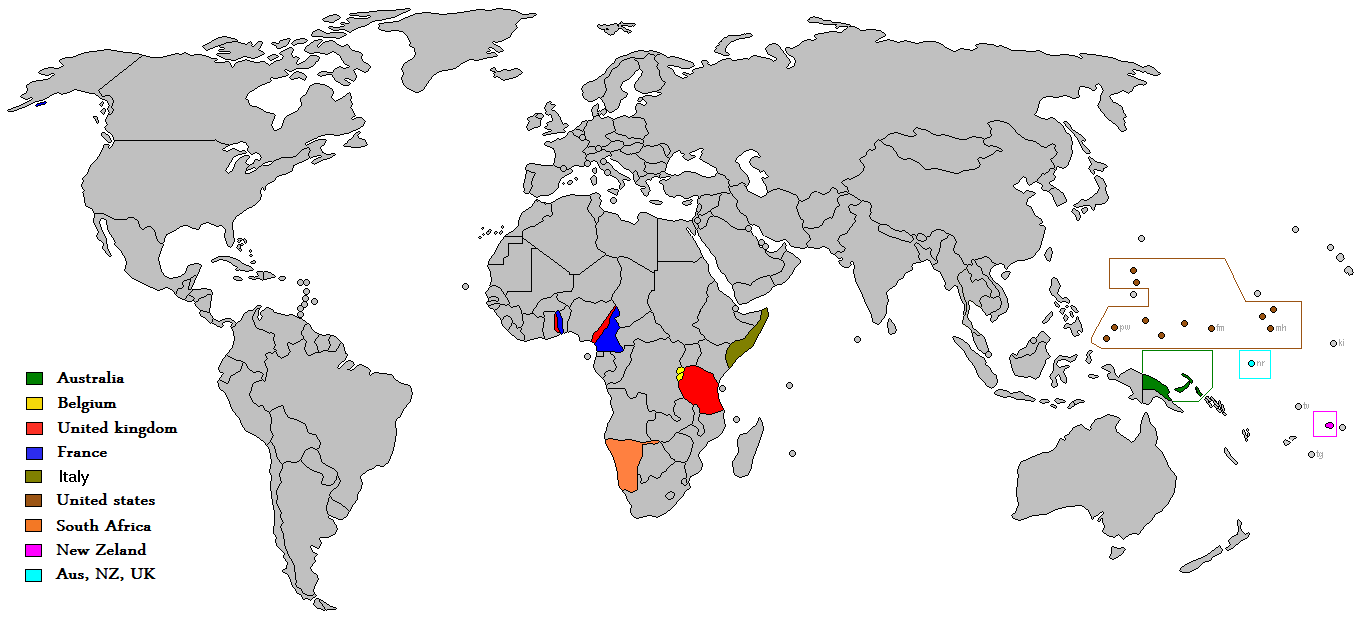
UN trust territories by trustee

Modern successor states of UN trust territories: Modern states composed solely of former trust territories Modern states composed partially of former trust territories

The United Nations trust territories were the successors of the remaining League of Nations mandates, and came into being when the League of Nations ceased to exist in 1946. All the trust territories were administered through the United Nations Trusteeship Council and authorised to a single country. The concept is distinct from a territory temporarily and directly governed by the United Nations.

The one League of Nations mandate not succeeded by a trust territory was South West Africa, at South Africa's insistence. South Africa's apartheid regime refused to commit to preparing the territory for independence and majority rule, as required by the trust territory guidelines, among other objections. South-West Africa eventually gained independence in 1990 as Namibia.

All trust territories have either attained self-government or independence. The last was Palau, formerly part of the Trust Territory of the Pacific Islands, which became a member state of the United Nations in December 1994.

== Trust territories (and administering powers) ==
=== Former German Schutzgebiete ===
All these territories previously were League of Nations mandates.

| Trust territories | United Nations Trusteeship Power | Prior name | Prior sov. | Comments | Current state |
|---|---|---|---|---|---|
| British Cameroon | United Kingdom | Kamerun | German colonial empire | Following a plebiscite, Northern Cameroons became part of Nigeria in May 1961 and Southern Cameroons joined Cameroon in October 1961. | Nigeria |
| British Cameroon | United Kingdom | Kamerun | German colonial empire | Following a plebiscite, Northern Cameroons became part of Nigeria in May 1961 and Southern Cameroons joined Cameroon in October 1961. | Republic of Cameroon |
| French Cameroon | France | Kamerun | German colonial empire | Achieved independence as Cameroon in 1960. | Republic of Cameroon |
| Territory of Nauru | Australia, New Zealand, United Kingdom | German New Guinea | German colonial empire | Granted independence from Australia (administering authority) in 1968. | Nauru |
| Territory of New Guinea | Australia | German New Guinea | German colonial empire | In 1975, it was legally unified with the Territory of Papua and granted independence as Papua New Guinea. The western half of the island, formerly Dutch and now part of Indonesia, was never part of either territory. | Papua New Guinea |
| Ruanda-Urundi | Belgium | German East Africa | German colonial empire | Separately gained independence in 1962 as Republic of Rwanda and Kingdom of Burundi. | Republic of Rwanda |
| Ruanda-Urundi | Belgium | German East Africa | German colonial empire | Separately gained independence in 1962 as Republic of Rwanda and Kingdom of Burundi. | Republic of Burundi |
| Tanganyika Territory | United Kingdom | German East Africa | German colonial empire | Granted independence in 1961. Federated with the former British protectorate Zanzibar in 1964 to form Tanzania. | United Republic of Tanzania |
| French Togoland | France | Togoland | German colonial empire | Became independent as Togo in 1960. | Togo |
| British Togoland | United Kingdom | Togoland | German colonial empire | This territory was merged in 1956 with the British colony of the Gold Coast, which was granted independence as Ghana in 1957. | Ghana |
| Western Samoa | New Zealand | German Samoa | German colonial empire | Granted independence in 1962, known since 1997 simply as Samoa. | Independent State of Samoa |

=== Former Japanese possessions ===
| Trust territories | United Nations Trusteeship Power | Prior name | Prior sov. | Current state | Comments |
|---|---|---|---|---|---|
| Trust Territory of the Pacific Islands | United States | South Seas Mandate | Empire of Japan | Northern Mariana Islands | Became US Commonwealth in 1986. |
| Trust Territory of the Pacific Islands | United States | South Seas Mandate | Empire of Japan | Marshall Islands | Became an associated state of the United States after signing a Compact of Free Association in 1986. |
| Trust Territory of the Pacific Islands | United States | South Seas Mandate | Empire of Japan | Federated States of Micronesia | Became an associated state of the United States after signing a Compact of Free Association in 1986. |
| Trust Territory of the Pacific Islands | United States | South Seas Mandate | Empire of Japan | Palau | Became an associated state of the United States after signing and ratifying a Compact of Free Association going into effect in 1994. |

=== Former Italian possessions ===
Italy was the only country to keep its former possession upon becoming a trust Territory.

| Trust territories | United Nations Trusteeship Power | Prior name | Prior sov. | Current state | Comments |
|---|---|---|---|---|---|
| Territory of Somaliland | Italy | Italian East Africa | Italian Empire | Somalia | In 1960, the Trust Territory merged with the State of Somaliland to form the Somali Republic |

== Proposed trust territories ==
=== British-occupied territories ===
- Jerusalem: Under the United Nations Partition Plan for Palestine, Jerusalem would have become a corpus separatum territory under United Nations Trusteeship Council administration. Both Palestinian Arabs and the Yishuv opposed this solution.
- Mandatory Palestine: The United States government under Harry Truman proposed a UN trusteeship status for the Mandatory Palestine in 1948.

=== Italian-occupied territory ===
- Italian Libya: Between 1945 and 1947, the Soviet Union made various proposals that Tripolitania be placed under Soviet trusteeship for ten years, or a joint trusteeship with the United Kingdom and the United States, or that Libya as a whole become an Italian trusteeship.

=== Japanese-occupied territories ===
- Karafuto Prefecture: In January 1945, Hugh Borton prepared a document for American officials headed to the Yalta Conference. Suggesting that a "proposed international organization" could place Karafuto under a Soviet-administered trusteeship.
- Korea: In wartime talks, Franklin D. Roosevelt proposed that Korea be placed under an American–Soviet trust administration. The plan was eclipsed after Roosevelt's death on 12 April 1945, although it was expressed in the December Moscow Conference, and caused considerable civil unrest in Korea.
- Ryukyu Islands and Bonin Islands: the Treaty of San Francisco included provisions which provided the United States the right to convert its administration over the Ryukyu and Bonin Islands into a trust territory, but it never did so before sovereignty was voluntarily reverted to Japan.
- Vietnam: Roosevelt also proposed that French Indochina be placed under an international trusteeship as an alternative to French colonial rule and immediate independence.

== See also ==
- List of territories governed by the United Nations
- Trust Territory of the Pacific Islands

== Bibliography ==
- The United Nations and Decolonization: Trust Territories that Have Achieved Self-Determination
- WorldStatesmen – Index of Possessions and Colonies
