= Augustine Ngom Jua =

Cameroonian politician

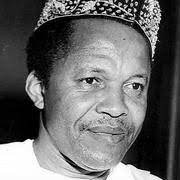
Augustine Ngom Jua

Augustine Ngom Jua (24 November 1924 – 30 December 1977) was the prime minister of the state of West Cameroon (formerly Southern Cameroons) in the Federal Republic of Cameroon from 13 May 1965 to 11 January 1968.

== Early life, education and career ==
Jua was born on 24 November 1924 at Wum in Cameroon. He went to local schools and worked as a teacher in the Bamenda area. He became a member of Wum Native Authority Council under the British Trusteeship administration in 1952.

== Politics ==
When the British Southern Cameroons was separated from Eastern Nigeria in 1954, Jua was elected as a member of Southern Cameroon's House of assembly. In 1955 he helped Mr J.N Foncha found the Kamerun National Democratic Party (KNDP), a party which favors reunification with the French Cameroon. Jua was elected vice president of KNDP in 1963 in a contest with Mr Solomon Tandeng Muna. In 1965, after a constitutional amendment, President Ahmadou Ahidjo appointed Jua as prime minister. He was the head of that government for less than three years and after the elections in December 1967, Jua was replaced as prime minister by Mr Solomon Tandeng Muna.

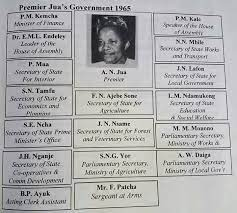
Njua's Government of West Cameroon (1965)

== Later life and death ==
After he was replaced as prime minister, Jua then retired and lived to see a unitory state created. He died on 30 December 1977, aged 53.
