= Cameroon People's National Convention =

Political party in British Cameroons

- Abbreviation: CPNC
- Leader: E. M. L. Endeley
- Founded: May 1960
- Merger of: Kamerun National Congress; Kamerun People's Party

The Cameroon People's National Convention (CPNC) was a political party in British Cameroons.

== History ==
The CPNC was established in May 1960 by a merger of the Kamerun National Congress and the Kamerun People's Party, which had contested the 1959 elections together.

The 1961 elections saw the party receive 26.8% of the vote, winning 10 seats, two fewer than the two parties had won in 1959.

In the first elections in unified Cameroon in 1964, the party ran in East Cameroon. Although it received 24% of the vote, it failed to win a seat.
