= Salomon Tandeng Muna =

Prime Minister of Cameroon

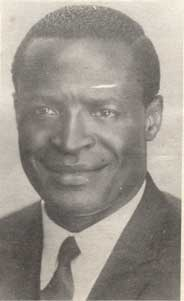
- Muna in 1970

2nd Vice President of Cameroon
- In office 26 February 1970 – 1 May 1972
- President: Ahmadou Ahidjo
- Preceded by: John Ngu Foncha
- Succeeded by: Office abolished

2nd President of the National Assembly of Cameroon
- In office 14 June 1973 – 1 July 1988
- Preceded by: Marcel Marigoh Mboua
- Succeeded by: Lawrence Fonka Shang

3rd Prime Minister of West Cameroon
- In office 11 January 1968 – 2 June 1972
- President: Ahmadou Ahidjo
- Preceded by: Augustine Ngom Jua
- Succeeded by: Office abolished

Personal details
- Born: 27 March 1912
- Died: 22 January 2002 (aged 89) Douala, Cameroon
- Party: Cameroonian National Union
- Other political affiliations: Kamerun National Congress; Kamerun National Democratic Party; Cameroon United Congress

Salomon Tandeng Muna (27 March 1912 – 22 January 2002) was a Cameroonian politician. He served as the third prime minister of the federated state of West Cameroon from 1968 to 1972. Additionally, he served as the second vice president of Cameroon from 1970 to 1972. He was the second president of the National Assembly of Cameroon from 1973 to 1988.

Muna was very active in international scouting, where he became the Vice-President of the World Scout Committee (the first African member), after serving as Chief Scout of Cameroon, as well as Chairman of the African Scout Committee.

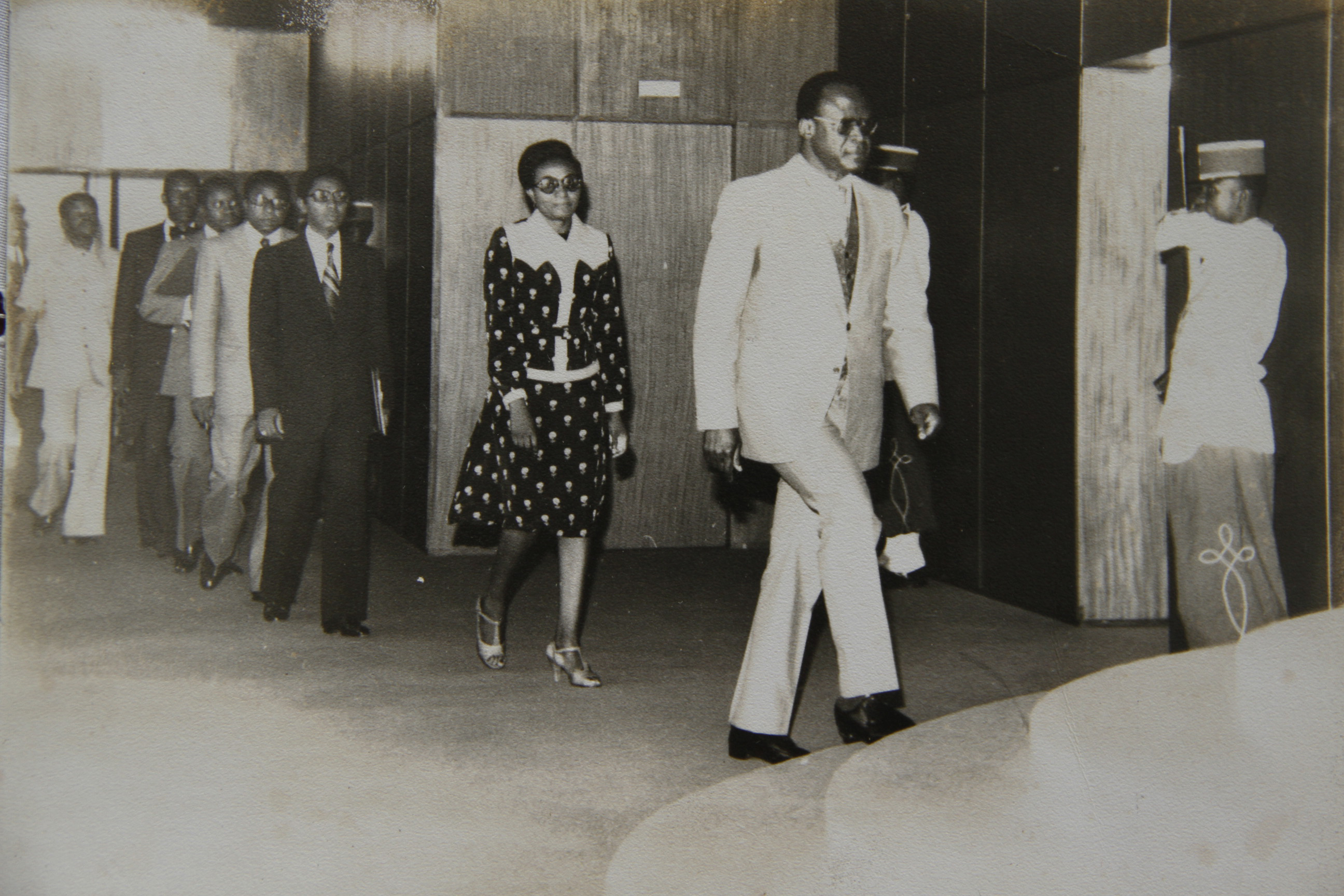
Ms. Ebanda, secretary of the office of the National Assembly of Cameroon following President Salomon Tandeng Muna

Muna was awarded the Bronze Wolf, the only distinction of the World Organization of the Scout Movement, awarded by the World Scout Committee for exceptional services to world Scouting, in 1981.
