= John Ngu Foncha =

Cameroonian politician

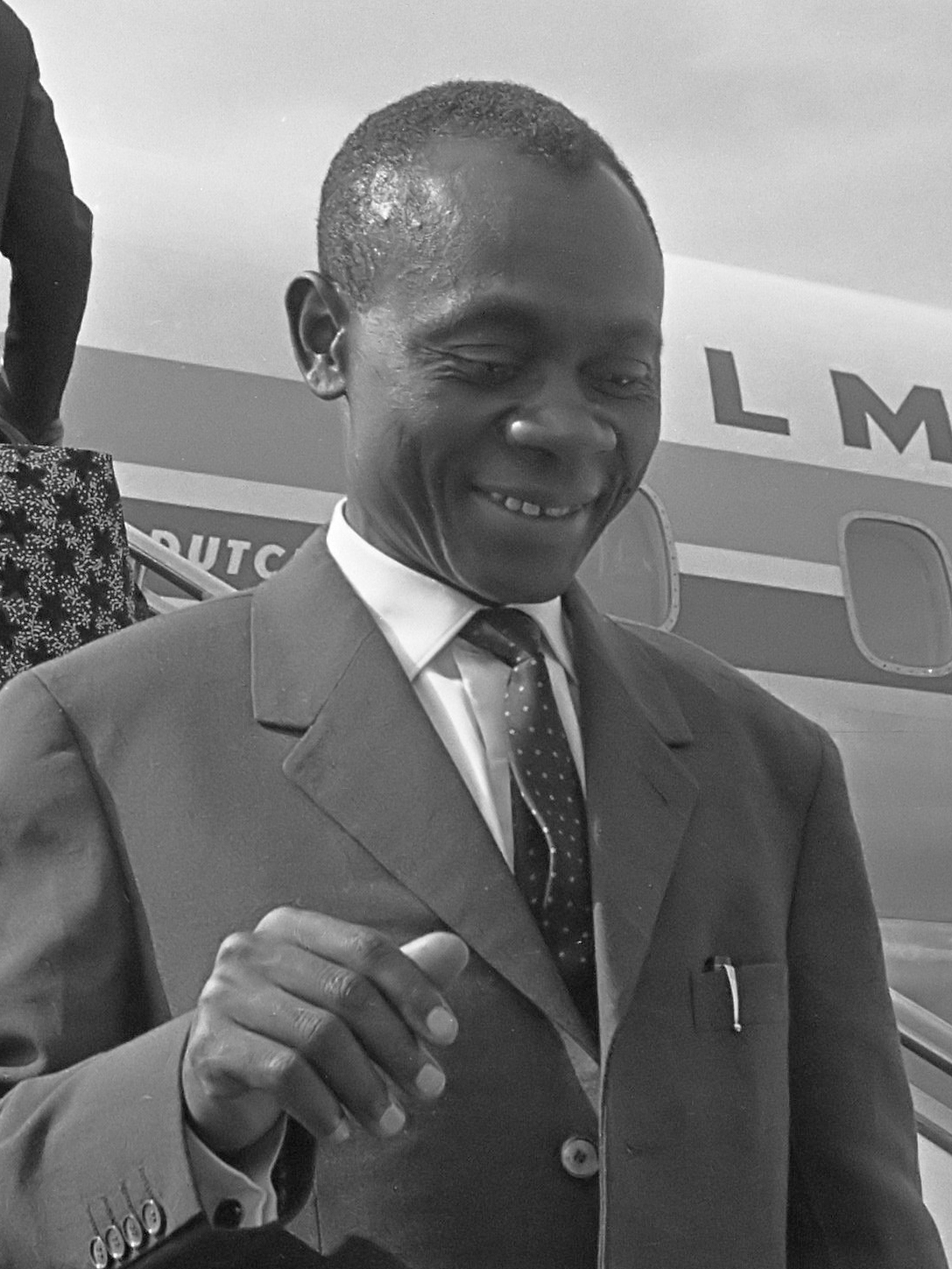
Foncha in 1964

John Ngu Foncha (21 June 1916 – 10 April 1999) was a Cameroonian politician, who served as 5th Prime Minister of Cameroon.

== Career ==
Foncha was born in Bamenda. He founded the Kamerun National Democratic Party (KNDP) in 1955 and became Premier of the British Cameroons on 1 February 1959. He held that position until 1 October 1961, when the region, renamed West Cameroon, merged into a federation with Francophone Cameroon.

From 1 October 1961 to 13 May 1965, Foncha concurrently served as 5th Prime Minister of Cameroon and Vice-president of the Federal Republic of Cameroon. He held the latter title until 1970.

In 1994, he led a delegation of the Southern Cameroons National Council (SCNC) to the United Nations to request its backing of the movement's drive for greater autonomy in Cameroon's two English-speaking provinces. His grandson is Jean-Christian Foncha.

He died in Bamenda on 10 April 1999 at the age of 82.

== Gallery ==
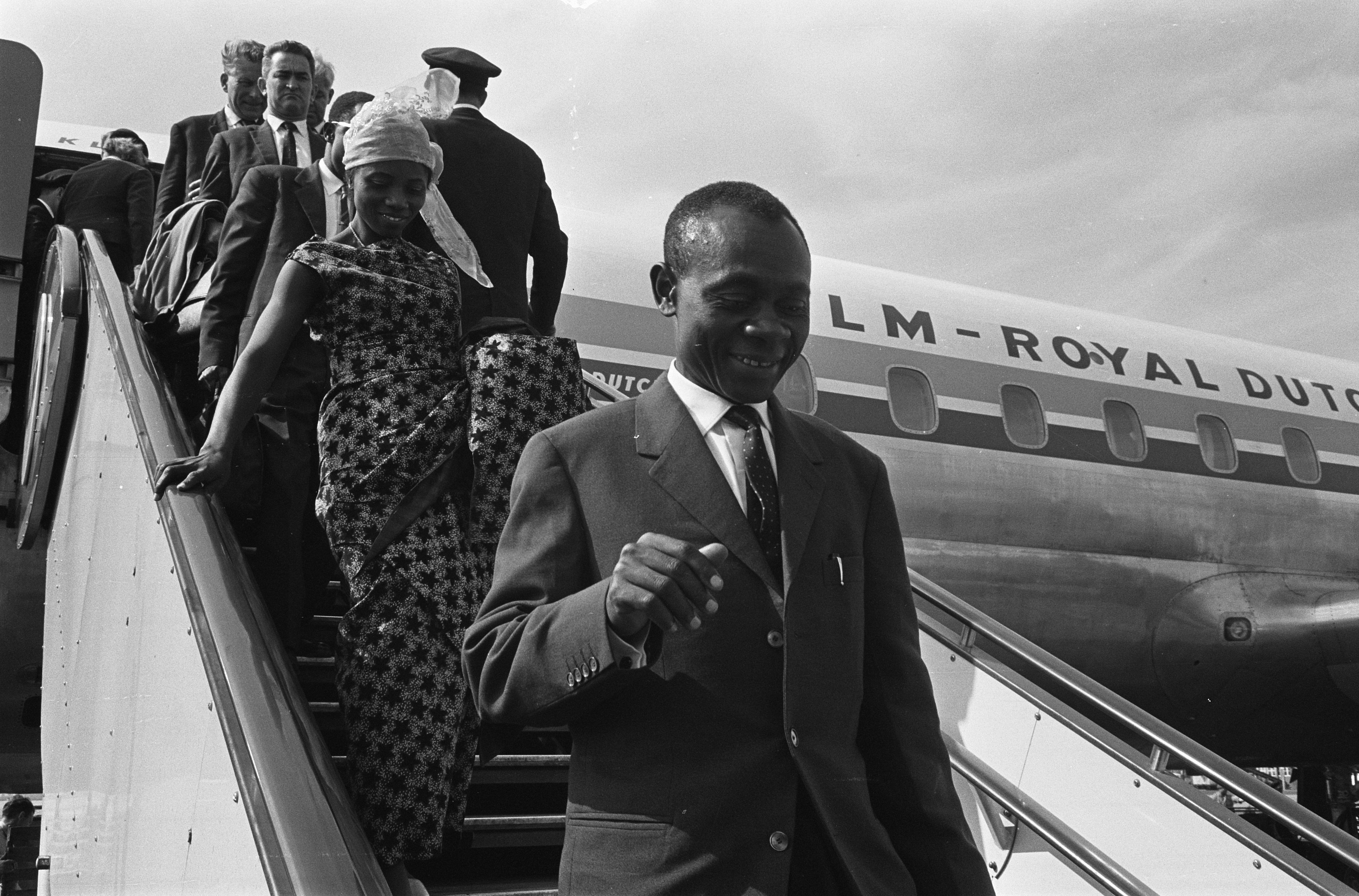
Arrival of Vice President of Cameroon J. Foncha at Schiphol, no. 4 J. Foncha (head)

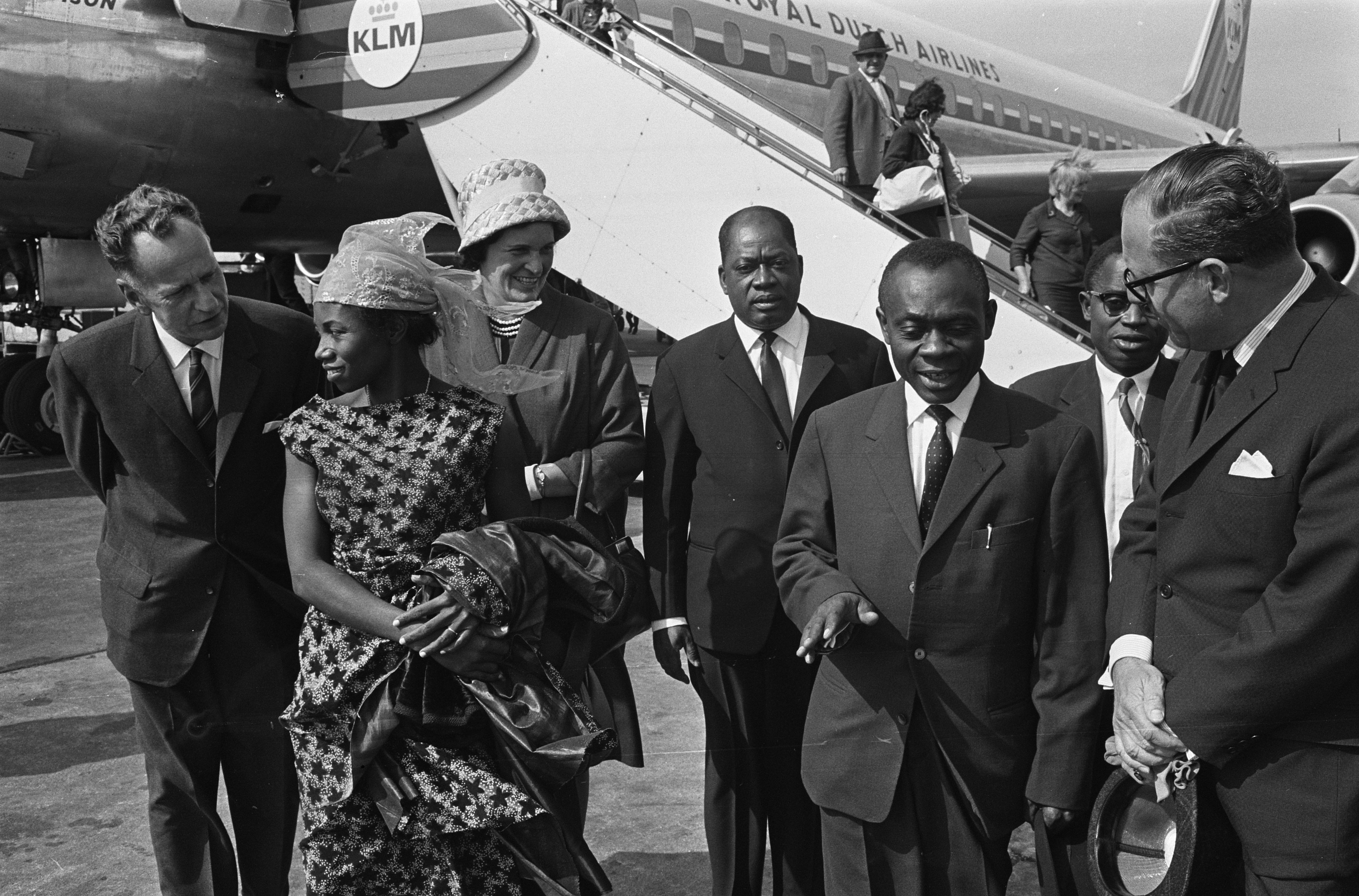
Arrival of Vice President of Cameroon J. Foncha at Schiphol, no. 4 J. Foncha (head)

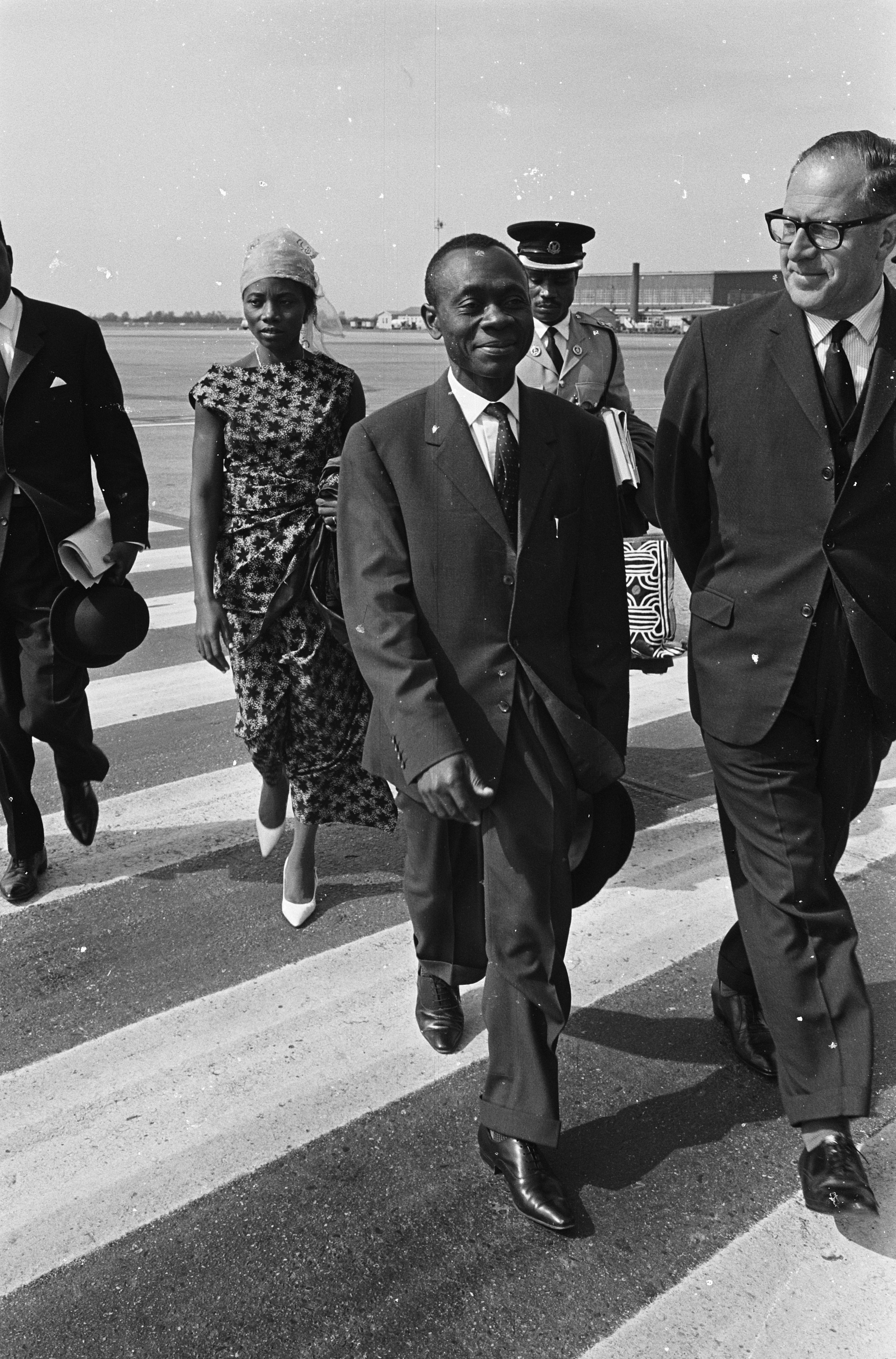
Arrival of Vice President of Cameroon J. Foncha at Schiphol, left behind his wife Mr. Ngu on the right
