= British Cameroons =

British mandate in West Africa (1916–1961)

Coordinates: 6°N 10°E

- 1916–1961
- Flag Coat of arms

- Status: Occupied territory of the United Kingdom (1916–1922); Class B League of Nations mandate under British administration (1922–1946); United Nations trust territory under British administration (1946–1961)
- Capital: Buea
- Common languages: English (official); Duala, Oroko, Grassfields, Fula, Kanuri widely spoken
- Religion: Christianity (southern area); Islam (northern area)
- Historical era: World War I
  - Kamerun partitioned: 20 July 1916
  - Integration into Nigeria and Cameroon: 1 October 1961

Area
  - Total: 89,526 km^{2} (34,566 sq mi)
- Currency: British West Africa pound
Preceded by	Succeeded by
Kamerun	Federation of Nigeria; Federal Republic of Cameroon
- Today part of: Cameroon; Nigeria

British Cameroons or British Cameroon was a British mandate territory in British West Africa, formed of the Northern Cameroons and Southern Cameroons. Today, the Northern Cameroons forms parts of the Borno, Adamawa and Taraba states of Nigeria, while the Southern Cameroons forms part of the Northwest and Southwest regions of Cameroon.

== History ==
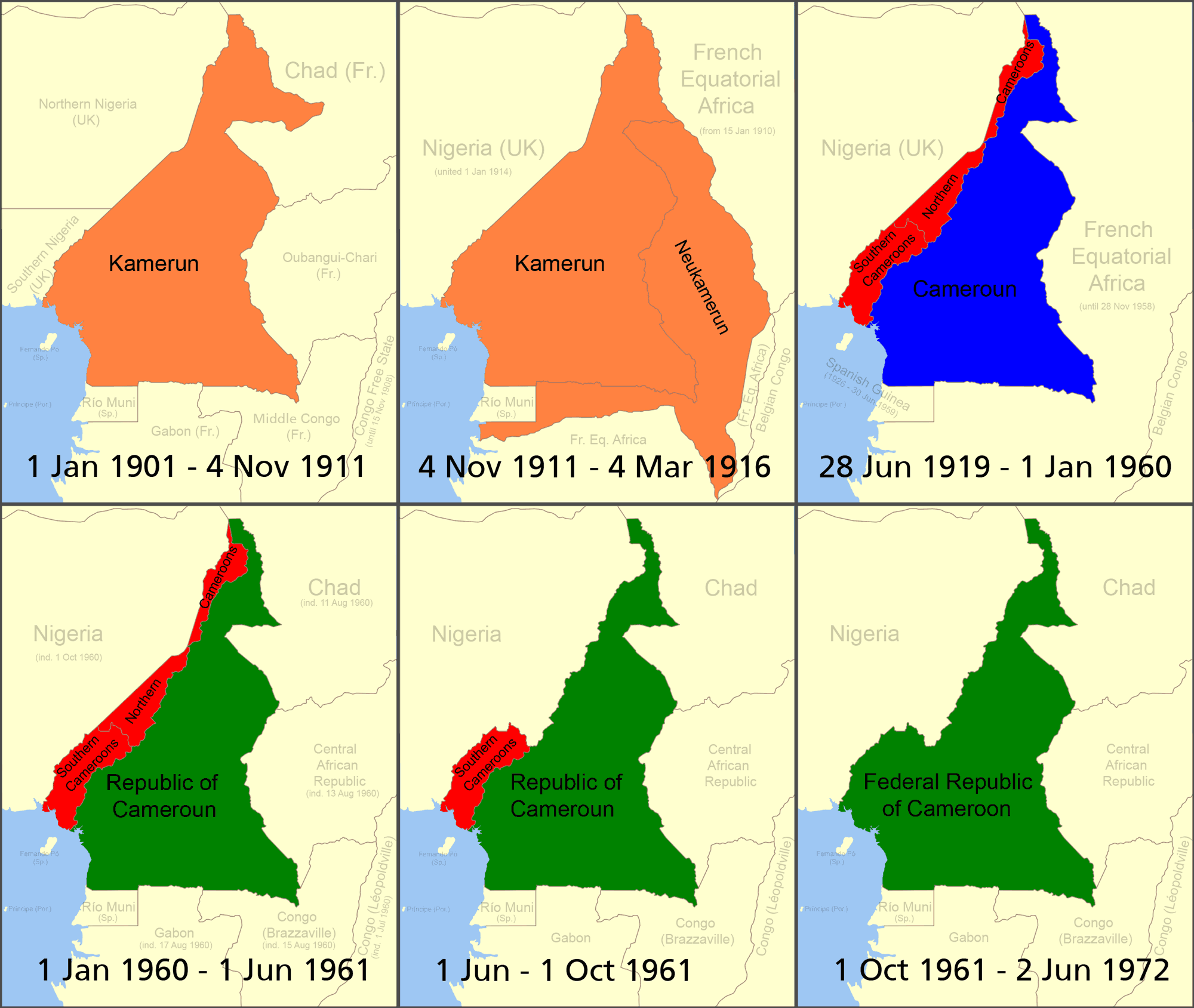
Cameroon from 1901–1972 German Kamerun British Cameroons French Cameroon Republic of Cameroon

The area of present-day Cameroon was claimed by Germany as a protectorate during the "Scramble for Africa" at the end of the 19th century. The German Empire named the territory Kamerun. During World War I, French and British troops invaded the German colony Kamerun (Present day Cameroon) and decided to divide the German colony into two regions. One of the regions would be French administered (French Cameroon) and the other would be British administered (British Cameroons). The British were more concerned with other areas of Africa, specifically Nigeria. Thus, the French gained a larger portion of Cameroon when the country was divided.

=== League of Nations mandate ===
During World War I, it was occupied by British, French and Belgian troops, and a later League of Nations mandate to Great Britain and France by the League of Nations in 1922. The French mandate was known as Cameroun and the British territory was administered as two areas, Northern Cameroons and Southern Cameroons. Northern Cameroons consisted of two non-contiguous sections, divided by a point where the Nigerian and Cameroun borders met. In the 1930s, most of the white population consisted of Germans, who were interned in British camps starting in June 1940. The native population of 400,000 showed little interest in volunteering for the British forces; only 3,500 men did so.

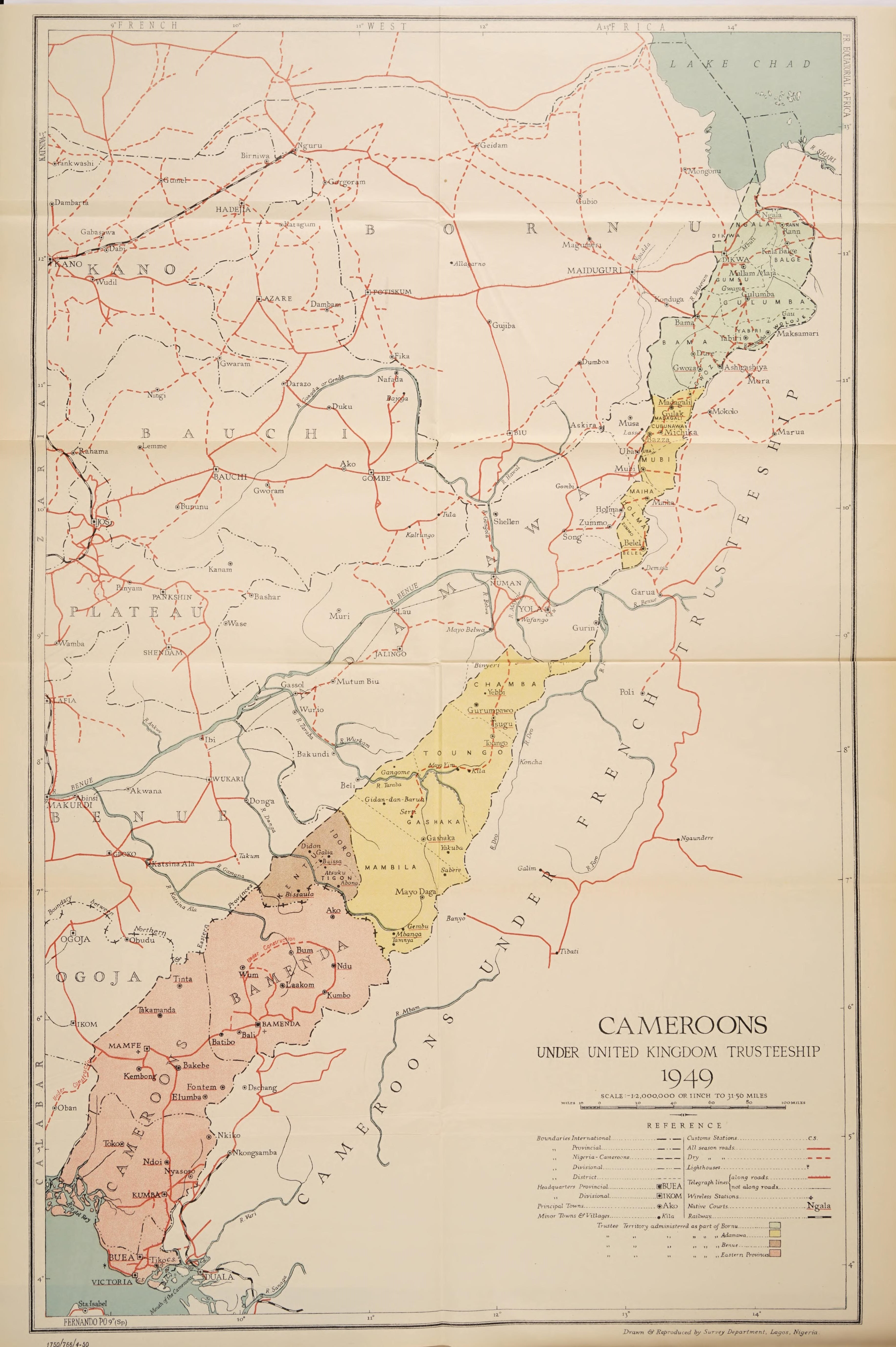
Detailed map of Cameroons under United Kingdom trusteeship, 1949, showing provinces, districts and towns. Produced by the Survey Department, Lagos, Nigeria.

=== Trust territory ===
When the League of Nations ceased to exist in 1946, most of the mandate territories were reclassified as United Nations trust territories, henceforth administered through the United Nations Trusteeship Council. The object of trusteeship was to prepare the lands for eventual independence. The United Nations approved the Trusteeship Agreements for British Cameroons to be governed by Britain on 6 December 1946.

=== Colonial legacy ===
Under colonial rule, Cameroons was ruled on the basis of indirect rule which allowed natives to execute judicial and executive decisions. The British in Cameroons used indirect rule because it meant that Cameroonians would comply willingly rather than having to coercively force compliance. This was important because it gave citizens of British Cameroons autonomy and helped to establish “a greater vitality of local political institutions in West Cameroon”. Despite the indirect rule used to invigorate the spirit of citizens, the British found that they had to "approach various developmental programs" because "there was little involvement of the local people in planning and executing community development programmes."

In British Cameroons, European immigrants were subject to the laws of their home country while natives of Cameroons were held to customary law which was typically overseen by British administrators.

The legal system established during the colonial era continues to be implemented, specifically, customary laws and the two legal systems. As the community development programmes grew, there was a large delay in educational efforts because British Cameroons ". . .had no secondary school in the territory." Secondary education was largely the work of missionaries such as St. Joseph College which opened in Sasse, Buea, in 1939.

=== Independence ===
As French Cameroon gained independence, British Cameroons was still under the administration of Nigeria. French Cameroun became independent, as Cameroun or Cameroon, on 1 January 1960, and Nigeria was scheduled for independence later that same year, which raised the question of what to do with the British territory. As colonizers of Nigeria, the British desired for the two to be united. After some discussion (which had been going on since 1959), a UN-administered plebiscite was agreed to and held on 11 February 1961. The Muslim-majority Northern Area opted for union with Nigeria, and the Southern Area voted to join Cameroon. No option was given for British Cameroonian independence. The driving force for the unification of east and south Cameroon was Ahmadou Ahidjo and the Kamerun National Democratic Party (KNDP) as the French were not concerned because southern Cameroon did not align with the French community established.

Upon reunification with French Cameroon, Anglophone Cameroonians "made up about 20% of the federal population…their French counterparts made up a majority at 80 percent".

Northern Cameroons became the Sardauna Province of Northern Nigeria on 1 June 1961, while Southern Cameroons became West Cameroon, a constituent state of the Federal Republic of Cameroon, later that year on 1 October 1961.

The separatist Ambazonia movement seeks to create an independent state out of the Cameroonian portion of British Cameroons, arguing that its Anglophone population is persecuted by the Francophone population of the rest of Cameroon.

== See also ==
- Postage stamps and postal history of British Cameroons
- Ambazonia
