= Honey Hill order of battle =

The following Confederate and Union units and commanders fought in the Battle of Honey Hill of the American Civil War on November 30, 1864.

== Abbreviations used ==
=== Military rank ===
- MG = Major General
- BG = Brigadier General
- Col = Colonel
- Ltc = Lieutenant Colonel
- Maj = Major
- Cpt = Captain
- Lt = Lieutenant

== Confederate ==
=== Military District of Georgia ===
Col Charles J. Colcock

- Georgia Militia: MG Gustavus W. Smith

Organizations	Regiments and others
Infantry BG Beverly H. Robertson	1st Brigade, Georgia Militia: Col James Willis; State Line Brigade (Georgia): Ltc James Wilson; 17th Georgia Infantry Battalion (State Guards): Ltc J. J. Edwards; 32nd Georgia Infantry Regiment: Ltc Edwin H. Bacon; The Athens Battalion: Maj Ferdinand W. C. Cook; The Augusta Battalion: Maj George T. Jackson
Cavalry Maj John Jenkins	Companies B and E, and detachments from Company C and the Rebel Troop, 3rd South Carolina Cavalry Regiment
Artillery Col Ambrosio J. Gonzales	Section of the Beaufort Artillery: Cpt Henry M. Stuart; Section of the De Pass's Light Battery; Section of the LaFayette Artillery; Gun from Kanapaux's Light Battery: Lt Zealy

== Union ==
=== Coastal Division, Department of the South ===
BG John P. Hatch

Brigade	Regiments and others
1st Brigade BG Edward E. Potter	25th Ohio Infantry Regiment: Ltc Nathaniel Haughton; 32nd United States Colored Troops: Col George W. Baird; 34th United States Colored Troops: Ltc William W. Marple; 35th United States Colored Troops: Col James C. Beecher; 56th New York Infantry Regiment: Ltc Rockwell Tyler; 127th New York Infantry Regiment: Col William Gurney; 144th New York Infantry Regiment: Col James Lewis; 157th New York Infantry Regiment: Ltc James C. Carmichael
2nd Brigade Col Alfred S. Hartwell	54th Massachusetts Infantry Regiment: Ltc Henry N. Hooper; 55th Massachusetts Infantry Regiment: Lt Col Charles B. Fox; 102nd United States Colored Troops: Col Henry L. Chipman
Naval Brigade Commander George H. Preble	Naval Battalion: Lt James O'Kane; Marine Battalion: Lt George G. Stoddard
Artillery Brigade Ltc William Ames	Battery A, 3rd Rhode Island Heavy Artillery Regiment (section): Cpt William H. Hammer; Battery B, 3rd New York Light Artillery (4x12pdr): Cpt Thomas J. Meseareu; Co F, 3rd New York Artillery (4x12pdr): Lt Edgar H. Titus
Cavalry Cpt George Hurlbut	4th Massachusetts Cavalry Regiment (2 companies)

== See also ==
- List of orders of battle

== Sources ==
- Jones, Charles C. (1874). The Siege of Savannah in December, 1864, and the Confederate Operations in Georgia and the Third Military District of South Carolina During General Sherman's March from Atlanta to the Sea. Albany, N. Y.: Joel Munsell. OCLC 1084957628. OL 6915627M – via Internet Archive.
