= Mandara Kingdom =

Kingdom in modern-day Cameroon

Sultanate of Mandara
- c. 1500–1902
- Mandara on the outskirts of the Bornu Empire (c. 1810)
- Capital: Doulo; Mora
- Common languages: Mandara
- Religion: Traditional African religion, later Islam (official 1715)
- Government: Monarchy
- Historical era: Early modern period
  - Established: c. 1500
  - Islamization: 1715
  - Disestablished: 1902
Succeeded by
German Cameroon
- Today part of: Cameroon

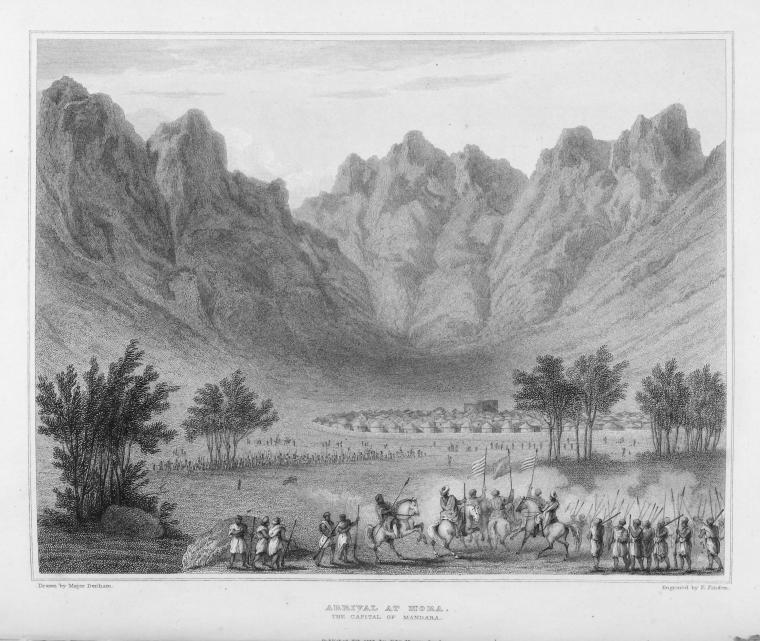
Arrival at Mora, the capital of Mandara by British explorer Edward Francis Finden in 1826.

The Mandara Kingdom (sometimes called Wandala or the Kingdom of Medra) was an African kingdom in the Mandara Mountains of what is today Cameroon. The Mandara people are descended from the kingdom's inhabitants.

== History ==
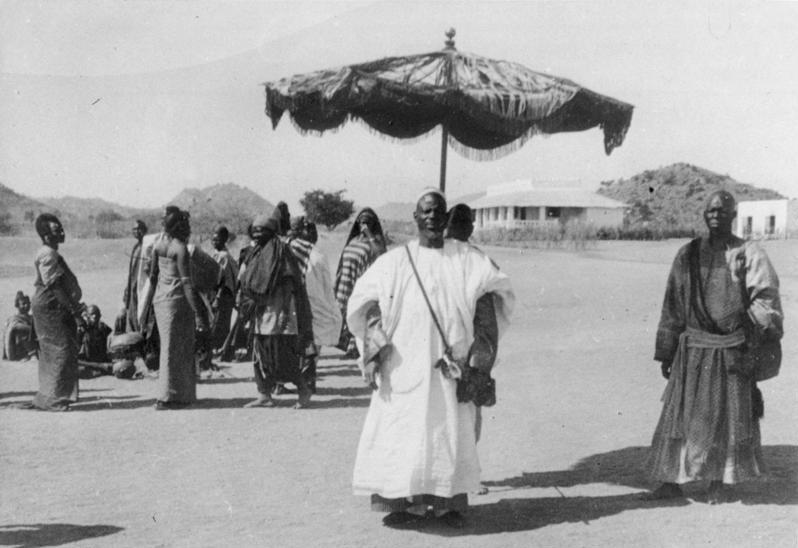
Sultan Bukar Afade c. 1911/15.

Tradition states that Mandara was founded shortly before 1500 by a female ruler named Soukda and a non-Mandarawa hunter named Gaya. The kingdom was first referred to by Fra Mauro (in 1459) and Leo Africanus (in 1526); the provenance of its name remains uncertain. Medra is mostly likely the original name of Mandara, one letter being obliterated in Leo's Arabic notes. Leo acknowledges the Kingdom of Medra (Mandara) for their good governors and rulers. The inhabitants of Medra are rich and industrious people, visited often, and great lovers of justice and equity. The region of Medra is listed on the Africae Tabula Nova in 1570. Leo Africanus visited the Kingdom of Medra, located in the south.

For the kingdom's first century of history, its rulers warred with neighbouring groups in an effort to expand their territories. After conquering the Dulo (or Duolo) and establishing the capital at Dulo c. 1580, the dynasty of Sankre, a war leader, began. When the Dulo made an attempt to seize the throne, the Bornu kingdom supported the claim of Aldawa Nanda, a member of Sankre's house. Emperor Idris Alaoma of Borno personally installed Nanda as king in 1614. Bornu thus attained an influential position over Mandara.

Mai Bukar Aji, the 25th king, made Mandara a sultanate c. 1715, which it would remain for nearly two hundred years. Muslim visitors converted Bukar to Islam, and the Islamicisation of the kingdom would continue for most of the next century.

The kingdom experienced a golden age of sorts under Bukar and his successor, Bukar Guiana (1773-1828). Around 1781, the Mandara defeated the kingdom of Borno in a major battle, further expanding their control in the region. At the peak of her power at the turn of the century, Mandara received tribute from some 15 chiefdoms. However, the kingdom faced a setback in 1809, when Modibo Adama, a Fulani disciple of Usman dan Fodio, led a jihad against Mandara. Adama briefly seized Dulo, though the Mandara counterattack soon drove him from the kingdom's borders. Adama's defeat prompted Borno to ally with Mandara once again against the Fulani invaders.

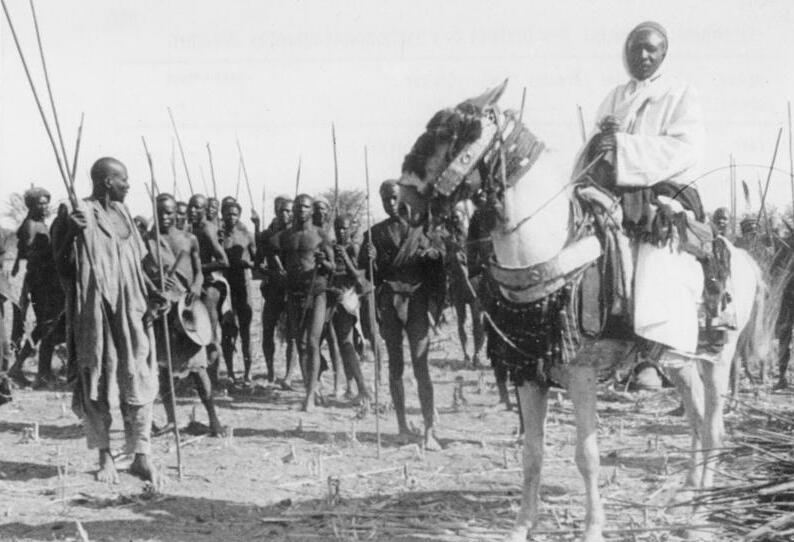
Sultan Bukar Afade (on horse) with a following of his people, c.1911/15.

Upon the death of ruler Bukai Dgjiama, Mandara's non-Muslim tributaries rose up, and the Fulani attacked once more. By 1850, Borno could not pass up the opportunity to attack the weakened kingdom. This renewed conflict began to sap the kingdom's strength, paving the way for the invasion of Muhammad Ahmad's forces in the 1880s. In 1895 or 1896, Muhammad Ahmad's army destroyed Dulo, marking a further decline in Mandara power. However, the kingdom continued to exist, repelling continual Fulani raids until it finally fell to them in 1893.

English explorer Dixon Denham accompanied a slave-raiding expedition from Borno into the Mandara kingdom in February 1823; though he barely escaped with his life following the raiders' defeat, he brought back one of the first European accounts of the kingdom. In 1902, the kingdom was conquered by Germany, passing then to France in 1918. In 1960, the Mandara kingdom became a part of newly independent Cameroon.

== Rulers of Mandara ==
Names and dates taken from John Stewart's African States and Rulers (Third edition, 2006).

Rulers of Mandara
Dates	Name
Kings of Mandara
c. 1500–?	Sukda
?–?	Unknown rulers
?–c. 1600	Ti-Maya
c. 1600–c. 1619	Sankré
c. 1619–?	Aldawa Nanda
?–?	Unknown rulers
?–c. 1715	Naldawa Nazariza
Sultans of Mandara
c. 1715–c. 1737	Mai Bukar Aji
c. 1737–1757	Mahmadi Makia
1757–1773	Ti-Kse Bldi
1773–1828	Bukar D'Gjiama
1828–1842	Hiassae
1842–1894	Bukar Narbanha
1895–1911	Umar Adjara
1911–1915	Bukar Afade
1915–1922	Umar Adjara
1922–May 1924	Amada
May 1924–March 1926	Kola Adama
March 1926–18 March 1942	Bukar Afade
18 March 1942–?	Hamidu Umar

== See also ==
- Politics of Cameroon
- Heads of government of Cameroon
- Colonial heads of Cameroon British Cameroon (Cameroons)
- Heads of government of British Cameroon (Cameroons)
- Colonial heads of French Cameroon (Cameroun)
- Heads of government of French Cameroon (Cameroun)
- Fon (title)
  - The Fon of Batibo
- Colonial heads of German Cameroon (Kamerun)
- Rulers of Mandara
- Rulers of the Bamum
- Lists of office-holders
