= Colcock =

Colcock is a surname. Notable people with the surname include:

- Charles Colcock Jones Carpenter (1899–1969), D.D., LL.D, Bishop of the Alabama Episcopal Diocese
- Charles J. Colcock (1820–1891), Confederate Colonel
- Richard W. Colcock (born 1806), Superintendent of the Citadel, (Military College of South Carolina), 1844–1852
- William F. Colcock (1804–1889), U.S. Representative from South Carolina
- Charles Colcock Jones (1804–1863), Presbyterian clergyman, educator, missionary, planter of Liberty County, Georgia
