= 1864 Massachusetts gubernatorial election =

- November 8, 1864
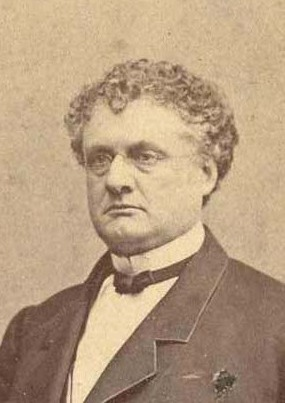

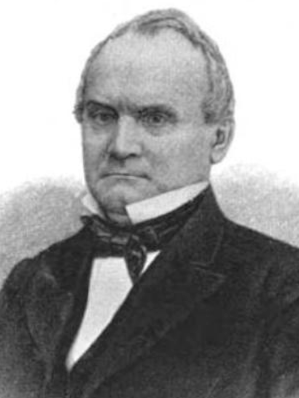
Nominee	John Albion Andrew	Henry W. Paine
Party	Republican	Democratic
Popular vote	125,291	49,190
Percentage	71.81%	28.19%
- County results Andrew: 60–70% 70–80% 80–90% >90%
Governor before election
John Albion Andrew
Republican
Elected Governor
John Albion Andrew
Republican

The 1864 Massachusetts gubernatorial election was held on November 8. Governor John Albion Andrew was re-elected to a fifth term in office over Democrat Henry W. Paine.

== General election ==
=== Candidates ===
- John Albion Andrew, governor of Massachusetts since 1861 (Republican)
- Henry W. Paine (Democratic)

=== Results ===
1864 Massachusetts gubernatorial election
Party	Candidate	Votes	%	±%
Republican	John Albion Andrew (incumbent)	125,291	71.81	▲1.11
Democratic	Henry W. Paine	49,190	28.19	▼1.11
Total votes		91,249	100.00	
Republican hold		Swing		

== See also ==
- 1864 Massachusetts legislature
