= 127th New York Infantry Regiment =

- Active: July 10, 1862 – June 30, 1865
- Country: United States
- Allegiance: Union
- Branch: Infantry
- Engagements: Siege of Suffolk; Battle of Diascund Bridge; Battle of Nine Mile Ordinary; Second Battle of Charleston Harbor; Battle of Honey Hill; Battle of Deveaux’s Neck; Battle of Tulifinny; Battle of Rivers' Bridge

Commanders
- Colonel: William Gurney

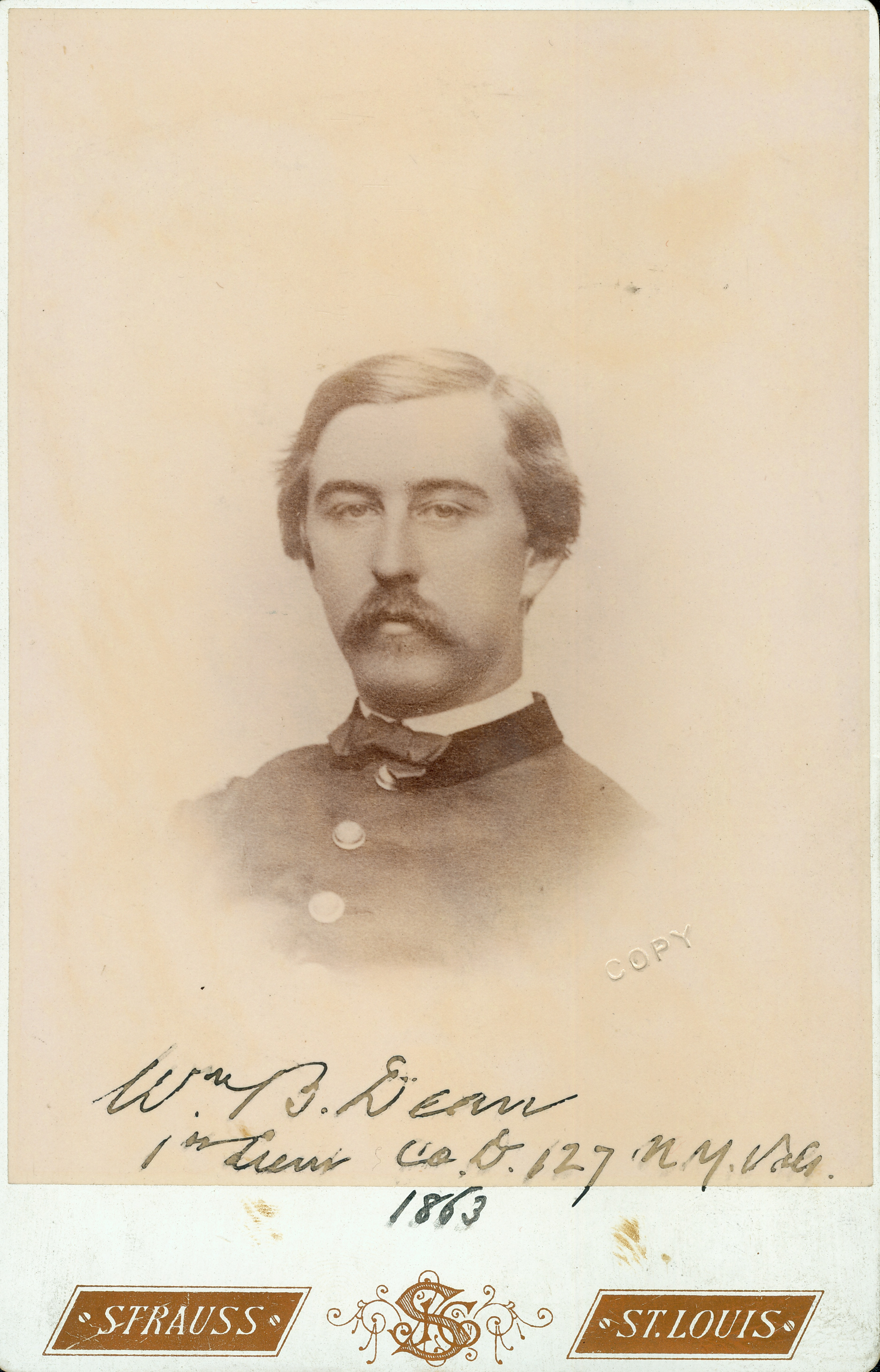
William B. Dean, 1st Lieutenant, Company D, 127th New York Infantry

The 127th New York Infantry Regiment (a.k.a. "National Volunteers" and "Monitors") was an infantry regiment in the Union Army during the American Civil War.

== Service ==
The 127th New York Infantry was organized at Staten Island, New York beginning July 10, 1862, and mustered in for three-years service on September 8, 1862, under the command of Colonel William Gurney.

The regiment was attached to Abercrombie's Brigade, Defenses of Washington, D.C., to October 1862. 2nd Brigade, 1st Division, and 4th Brigade, 1st Division, XII Corps, to October 1862. 3rd Brigade, Abercrombie's Division, Defenses of Washington, D.C. to February 1863. 3rd Brigade, Abercrombie's Division, XXII Corps, Department of Washington, to April 1863. 2nd Brigade, 3rd Division, VII Corps, Department of Virginia, to July 1863. 1st Brigade. 1st Division, XI Corps, Army of the Potomac, to August 1863. 1st Brigade, Gordon's Division, Folly Island, South Carolina, X Corps, Department of the South, to January 1864. 1st Brigade, Folly Island, South Carolina, Northern District, Department of the South, to April 1864. Morris Island, South Carolina, Northern District, Department of the South, to October 1864. District of Beaufort, South Carolina, 2nd Separate Brigade, Department of the South, to November 1864. 1st Brigade, Coast Division, Department of the South, to January 1865. 1st Separate Brigade, Northern District, Department of the South, to March 1865. 1st Separate Brigade, District of Charleston, South Carolina, Department of the South, to June 1865.

The 127th New York Infantry mustered out of service June 3, 1865.

== Detailed service ==
Left New York for Washington, D.C., September 10, 1862. Duty in the defenses of Washington, D.C., until April 1863. Moved to Suffolk, Virginia, April 18. Siege of Suffolk, April 20 – May 4. Dix's Peninsula Campaign, June 24 – July 7. Ordered to Washington, D.C., July 10. Pursuit of Lee to Berlin, Maryland, July 13–22. Moved to Folly Island, South Carolina, August 1–8. Siege operations against Forts Wagner and Gregg on Morris Island and against Fort Sumter and Charleston, South Carolina, August 9 – September 7. Bombardment of Fort Sumter, August 17–23. Operations against Charleston and duty on Folly and Morris Islands, South Carolina, until October 1864. Assault on Fort Johnson and Battery Simpkins, James Island, South Carolina, July 3, 1864. Duty at Beaufort, South Carolina, until November 1864. Hatch's Expedition up Broad River, November 28–30. Battle of Honey Hill, November 30. Demonstration on Charleston & Savannah Railroad, December 6–9. Deveaux's Neck, Tullifinney River, December 6. Tullifinney River, December 9. Charleston & Savannah Railroad, December 19 and 29. Duty in the Northern District and at Charleston, South Carolina, Department of the South, until June 1865.

== Casualties ==
The regiment lost a total of 130 men during service; 35 enlisted men killed or mortally wounded, one officer and 94 enlisted men died of disease.

== Commanders ==
- Colonel William Gurney

== See also ==
- List of New York Civil War regiments
- New York in the Civil War
