= 1863 Massachusetts gubernatorial election =

- November 3, 1863
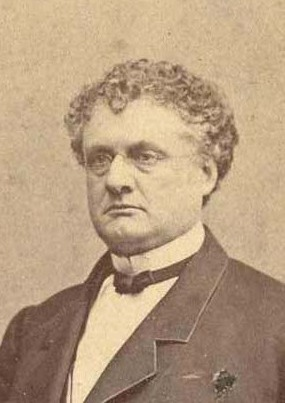

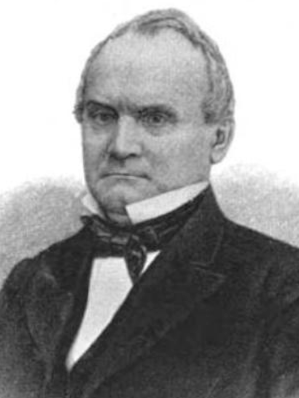
| Nominee | John Albion Andrew | Henry W. Paine |
| Party | Republican | Democratic |
| Popular vote | 70,483 | 29,207 |
| Percentage | 70.70% | 29.30% |
- County results Andrew: 50–60% 60–70% 70–80% 80–90% >90%
Governor before election
John Albion Andrew
Republican
Elected Governor
John Albion Andrew
Republican

The 1863 Massachusetts gubernatorial election was held on November 3. Governor John Albion Andrew was re-elected to a fourth term in office over Democrat Henry W. Paine.

== General election ==
=== Candidates ===
- John Albion Andrew, governor of Massachusetts since 1861 (Republican)
- Henry W. Paine (Democratic)

=== Results ===
1863 Massachusetts gubernatorial election
| Party | Candidate | Votes | % | ±% |
|---|---|---|---|---|
| Republican | John Albion Andrew (incumbent) | 70,483 | 70.70 | ▲11.12 |
| Democratic | Henry W. Paine | 29,207 | 29.30 | ▼11.12 |
| Total votes | | 99,690 | 100.00 | |
| Republican hold | | Swing | | |

== See also ==
- 1863 Massachusetts legislature
