= William Gurney =

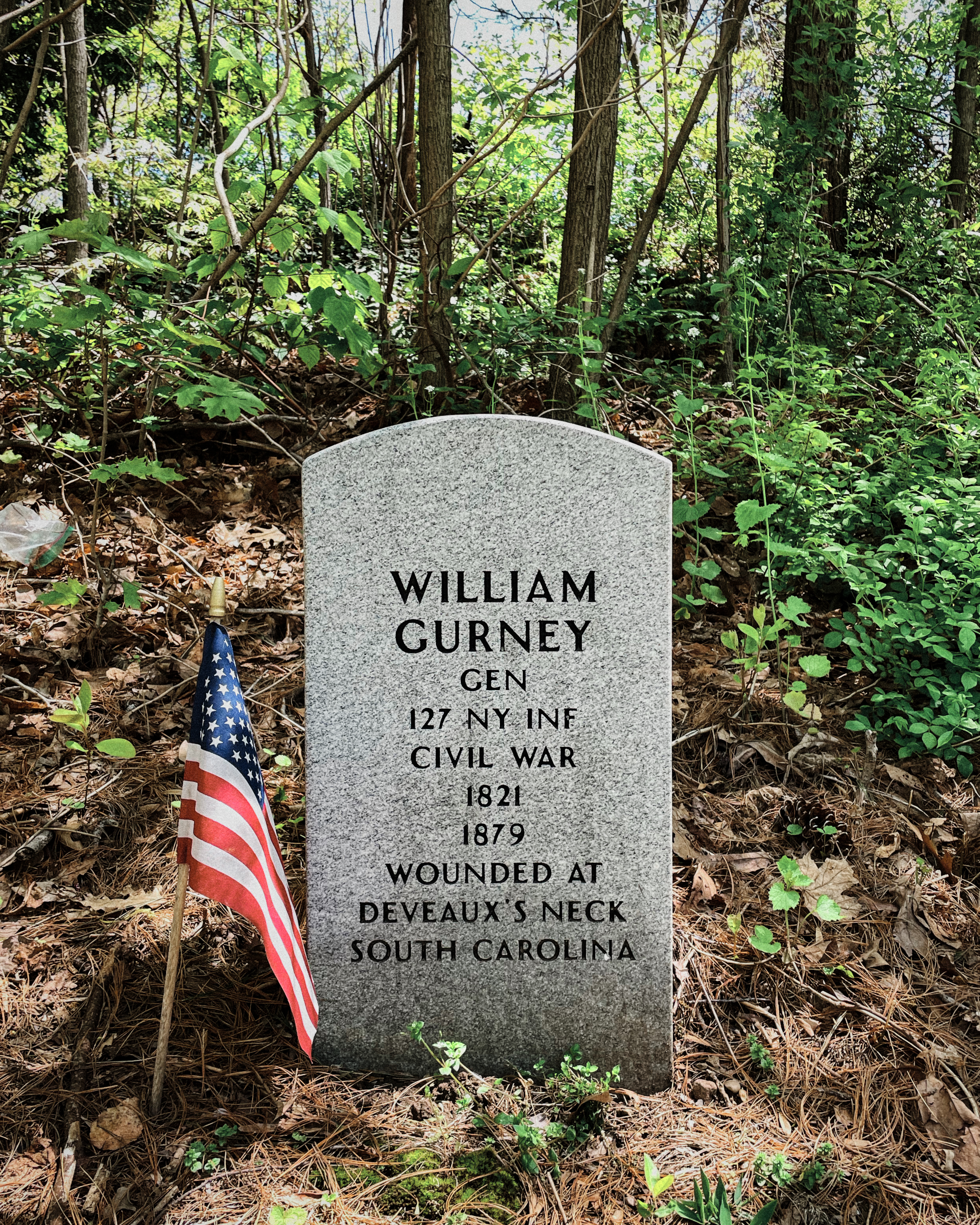
- Grave at Green-Wood Cemetery

General

Personal details
- Born: 21 August 1821 Flushing, Long Island
- Died: 2 February 1879 (aged 57) Charleston, South Carolina
- Party: Republican
- Profession: Military Officer, Cotton Factor

Military service
- Rank: Brigadier-General, United States Volunteers
- Battles/wars: American Civil War; Battle of Honey Hill

William Gurney (August 21, 1821 – February 2, 1879) was a soldier and statesmen from New York and South Carolina, who distinguished himself in the Civil War and within the craft of Freemasonry.

== Early life ==
Gurney was born at Flushing, Long Island, in 1821. He was of Quaker extraction.

Gurney went to New York City in 1837, and obtained employment as a clerk in the wholesale establishment of A.N. Brown, in Dey street. He became a junior partner of Mr. Brown, and afterward the head of the firm of Gurney & Underhill, which succeeded the old firm. He was one of the originators of the Five Points Mission in New York City.

== Masonic affiliations ==
Gurney was affiliated with many Masonic lodges including Adelphic and Arcana and in 1853 was one of the founders of Continental Lodge No. 287 Free and Accepted Masons in the state of New York. He was also a member of Adelphi Chapter and Morton Commandery.

== Military service ==
Gurney always took an active interest in the Militia, and was originally a member of the Eighth Regiment. At the outbreak of the American Civil War he was a First Lieutenant in the Seventh Regiment, which he accompanied during its three months' term of service. On his return to New York City he accepted a captain's commission in the Sixty-fifth Regiment, New York Volunteers, commanded by Col. John Cochrane.

In 1862 he was appointed Assistant Inspector-General and Examining Officer on the staff of Gov. Morgan, in which position he was required to pass upon the qualifications of persons applying for commissions in the regiments of the State of New York.

On July 10, 1862 Gurney received authority to raise a regiment, and in 30 days recruited the 127th New York Volunteer Infantry. It was organized on Staten Island September 8, 1862. Gurney returned to the front at the head of this unit.

Later in 1862 he was assigned to the command of the Second Brigade in Gen. Abercrombie's Division. In 1863, he was leading a division in the Department of Virginia forces.

In 1864 he joined the command of Gen. Q.A. Gillmore, who was then operating on the South Carolina coast. He was severely wounded at Deveaux's Neck, near Charleston, in December 1864, and was sent North for medical treatment.

On his recovery, he returned south and was assigned to duty as Commander of the post at Charleston, taking over the job from Stewart Woodford. While in this position, Gurney was involved in an incident with Stephen Atkins Swails, the first African American Commissioned Officer.

He was promoted for gallantry in action to the rank of brigadier general. Gurney returned to New York in July, 1865, where he was mustered out of the service.

The 127th New York Volunteers he had raised was mustered out on June 30, 1865 after three years of service to the United States.

== Post Civil War life ==
Gurney went back with his family to Charleston, where he established himself as a merchant and cotton factor.

In 1870 Gurney was appointed Treasurer of Charleston County. He was a member of the Electoral College in 1872 from South Carolina, and was the Commissioner from that State in the Centennial Exposition. He continued to reside in Charleston until about 1878, when he came North on account of his health.
