= Thomas Foulds Ellsworth =

US Army officer (1840-1911)

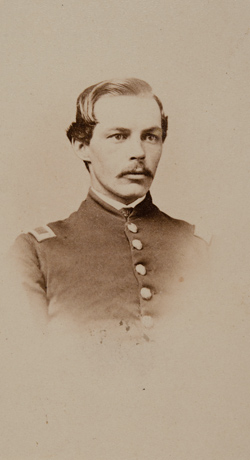
- Born: November 12, 1840; Ipswich, Massachusetts
- Died: August 29, 1911 (aged 70)
- Burial place: Altadena, California
- Military career
- Allegiance: United States of America
- Branch: United States Army; Union Army
- Rank: Captain
- Units: Company B, 55th Massachusetts Volunteer Infantry Regiment
- Conflicts: Battle of Honey Hill
- Awards: Medal of Honor

Thomas Foulds Ellsworth (November 12, 1840 - August 29, 1911) was an American soldier who received the Medal of Honor for valor during the American Civil War.

== Biography ==
Ellsworth served in the Union Army in the 55th Massachusetts Infantry. He received the Medal of Honor on November 18, 1895, for his actions at the Battle of Honey Hill.

== Medal of Honor citation ==
Citation:

The President of the United States of America, in the name of Congress, takes pleasure in presenting the Medal of Honor to Captain (Infantry) Thomas Foulds Ellsworth, United States Army, for extraordinary heroism on 30 November 1864, while serving with Company B, 55th Massachusetts Colored Infantry, in action at Honey Hill, South Carolina. Under a heavy fire Captain Ellsworth carried his wounded commanding officer from the field.

== See also ==
- List of American Civil War Medal of Honor recipients: A-F
