= List of heads of government of French Cameroon =

This is a list of heads of government of French Cameroon (Cameroun).

Tenure	Incumbent	Affiliation	Notes
16 May 1957 to 18 February 1958	André-Marie Mbida, Prime Minister		
18 February 1958 to 1 January 1960	Ahmadou Ahidjo, Prime Minister	UNC/UC	Becoming Head of State of independent Republic of Cameroon
1 January 1960	Independence as Republic of Cameroon		

== Affiliations ==
UC	Union du Camerounais
UC	(Cameroon Union) French Cameroon-based, from 1966: part of UNC
UNC	Union National du Camerounais
UNC	(Cameroonian National Union) from 1985: RDPC

== See also ==
- French Cameroon topics
  - List of colonial governors of French Cameroon
- Colonial governors of British Cameroon (Cameroons)
- Heads of government of British Cameroon (Cameroons)
- Colonial heads of German Cameroon (Kamerun)
- Colonial heads of Ambas Bay (Victoria Colony)
