= Charles J. Colcock =

From Jones-Liddell Fued

Charles Jones Colcock
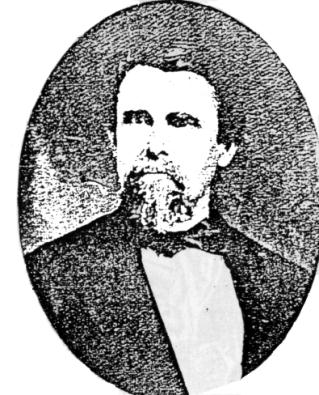
- Born: April 30, 1820; Barnwell County, South Carolina, United States
- Died: October 22, 1891 (aged 71); Hampton County, South Carolina, United States
- Burial place: Sheldon, South Carolina, United States
- Education: 1860 census shows he owned 113 slaves that he didn’t want to give up in St. Luke’s Parish.
- Military career
- Allegiance: Confederate States
- Branch: Confederate States Army
- Service years: 1862 – 1865
- Rank: Colonel, Brigadier General
- Commands: 3rd South Carolina Cavalry
- Conflicts: American Civil War: Second Battle of Pocotaligo; Battle of Honey Hill; Battle of Tulifinny; Battle of Rivers' Bridge; Battle of Bentonville

Charles Jones Colcock (April 30, 1820 - October 22, 1891) was a Confederate Colonel who was most notable for commanding the 3rd South Carolina and serving at the Battle of Honey Hill after General G. W. Smith relinquished command to him as the main Confederate commander.

== Biography ==
Charles was born on April 30, 1820, in Barnwell County, South Carolina as the son of slave owners Thomas Hutson Colcock and Eliza Mary Hay. He married Mary Caroline Heyward in 1838, Lucy Frances Horton in 1851 and Agnes Bostick in 1864 and sired, among others, Charles J. Colcock Jr., John Colcock (who would be an officer in the 3rd South Carolina Infantry), and Francis Horton Colcock.

=== Military career ===
When South Carolina seceded from the United States, Charles Colcock joined the Confederate States Army in 1863 and commanded the 3rd South Carolina Cavalry. During his service, he was a projector of the Charleston and Savannah Railway and lead the 3rd South Carolina to defend the construction of the railroad.

During his military service, he was also put in charge of the Confederate Third Military District from Ashepoo to the Savannah River. When the Battle of Honey Hill broke out, General G. W. Smith was replaced with Colcock due to his knowledge of the geography and under his command, won the battle. In 1865, he would be promoted to Brigadier General.

=== Post-War Life ===
When the war ended, Colcock went into private life and eventually died without owning slaves on October 22, 1891, and was buried at Sheldon, South Carolina.
