= John Albion Andrew =

American lawyer and politician (1817–1867)

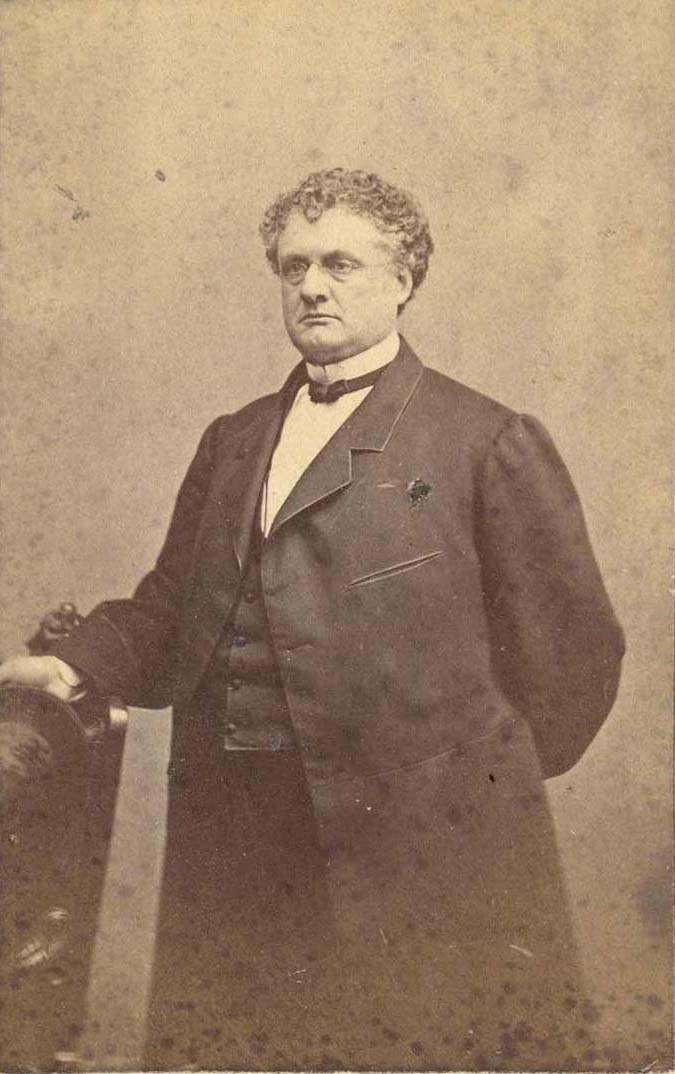
- Carte de visite of Andrew, by James Wallace Black

25th Governor of Massachusetts
- In office January 3, 1861 – January 4, 1866
- Lieutenant: John Z. Goodrich; John Nesmith; Joel Hayden
- Preceded by: Nathaniel P. Banks
- Succeeded by: Alexander H. Bullock

Member of the Massachusetts House of Representatives from the 6th Suffolk district
- In office January 6, 1858 – January 5, 1859 Serving with George P. Clapp
- Preceded by: Countywide district
- Succeeded by: Thornton K. Lothrop; Martin Brimmer II

Personal details
- Born: May 31, 1818 Windham, Massachusetts (now Windham, Maine)
- Died: October 30, 1867 (aged 49) Boston, Massachusetts
- Party: Whig (1840–1848); Free Soil (1848–1854); Republican (1854–1867)
- Spouse: Eliza Jane Hersey
- Children: John F. Andrew
- Profession: Lawyer

John Albion Andrew (May 31, 1818 – October 30, 1867) was an American lawyer and politician from Massachusetts. He was elected in 1860 as the 25th governor of Massachusetts, serving between 1861 and 1866, and led the state's contributions to the Union cause during the American Civil War (1861–1865). He was a guiding force behind the creation of some of the first African-American units in the United States Army, including the 54th Massachusetts Infantry. He belonged to the Whig, Free Soil, and Republican parties during his career.

Educated at Bowdoin College, Andrew was a radical abolitionist of slavery from an early age, engaged in the legal defense of fugitive slaves against owners seeking their return. He provided legal support to John Brown after his 1859 raid on Harpers Ferry, Virginia, raising his profile and propelling him to the Massachusetts governor's chair. Andrew was a persistent voice criticizing President Abraham Lincoln's conduct of the war, and pressing him to end slavery. By the end of the war, his politics had moderated, and he came to support the Reconstruction policies of Lincoln's successor, Andrew Johnson.

In Massachusetts, Andrew opposed the Know Nothing movement of the 1850s and the state's strict alcohol prohibition laws, and oversaw the state takeover of the Hoosac Tunnel construction project. In 1865, he signed legislation establishing the Massachusetts State Police, the first statewide police force of its type in the nation. He died early of apoplexy at the age of 49.

== Early life and career ==
Andrew was born in Windham (in modern-day Maine, then a part of Massachusetts) on May 31, 1818, the eldest of four children. His father, Jonathan Andrew, was descended from an early settler of Boxford, Massachusetts, and ran a small but prosperous merchant business in Windham. His mother, Nancy Green Pierce, was a teacher at Fryeburg Academy. Andrew's 5th great-grandfather was an immigrant from England named George Andrew who settled in Boxford, Massachusetts, in 1637. His 4th great-grandfather was born in Boxford, Massachusetts, in 1638, being his first American-born ancestor.

Andrew received his primary education first at home, and then at several area boarding schools. After his mother's death in 1832, he attended Gorham Academy in nearby Gorham. During his youth he exhibited talent for both memory and public speaking, memorizing church sermons and recounting them with the same oratorical style in which they were delivered. While a teenager, he was exposed to the early abolitionist writings of William Lloyd Garrison and others. He entered Bowdoin College in 1833. Although he was studious and popular with other students, he did not shine academically and was ranked near the bottom in his class.

After his graduation in 1837, Andrew moved to Boston to study law under Henry H. Fuller, with whom he became close friends. He was admitted to the Massachusetts bar in 1840, and began the practice of law.

== Antislavery legal and political advocate ==
After his admission to the bar, Andrew joined the Whig Party and became actively involved in the anti-slavery movement. As a Conscience Whig, he opposed the election of "Cotton Whig" Robert Charles Winthrop in the 1846 election for Congress, promoting Charles Sumner (over the latter's objection) as an independent candidate. He sat on the executive committee of Boston's first vigilance committee, an anti-slavery organization established in 1846 that was devoted to assisting escaped slaves. Andrew participated in the establishment in 1848 of the Free Soil Party, whose principal political goal was ending the expansion of slavery into western territories. The Free Soilers nominated Martin Van Buren for president; he placed third in the election, but the party was somewhat more successful at the state level, gaining seats in the state legislature and Congress.

In 1847, Andrew, then 29 and with his law practice underway, met Eliza Jane Hersey of Hingham at an anti-slavery fair. They were engaged that year and married on Christmas evening in 1848. They had four children: John Forrester (1850), Elizabeth Loring (1852), Edith (1854), and Henry Hersey (1858).

The Boston Vigilance Committee attracted many new members following congressional passage of the federal Fugitive Slave Act of 1850, which required law enforcement officials and citizens of free states as well as slave states to aid in the recovery of fugitive slaves. Andrew sat on a subcommittee that handled the legal defense of individuals accused of being fugitive slaves. He was also a regular attendee at meetings of the "Bird Club", a political group organized by businessman Francis Bird. Its members were mainly anti-slavery ex-Whigs, described by Samuel Gridley Howe as "straight & impractical republicans". Bird Club members would dominate the state's political establishment into the 1870s. Andrew's political activity was otherwise minimal, as he was devoted to his growing law practice and family, which was settled in Hingham. By 1855, his practice was sufficiently successful that he also purchased a house on Charles Street in Boston.

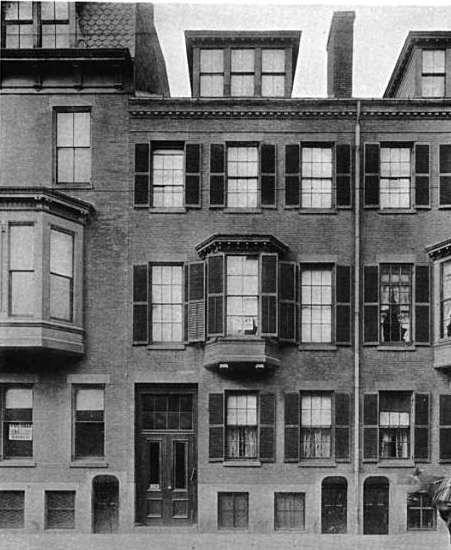
Andrew used this house at 110 Charles St., Boston, as a city residence from 1855 to 1867.

In 1854, Andrew became personally involved in the highly publicized fugitive slave case of Anthony Burns, defending one of the men who was arrested for trying to rescue Burns from the ship on which he was being held. Anger over that year's passage of the Kansas-Nebraska Act (which overturned the limitation of slavery's expansion under the Missouri Compromise of 1820) revitalized the Free Soil movement. He once defended a poor mixed race man on a murder charge at the Norfolk County Courthouse, pro bono.

Andrew was elected chair of a committee to manage a nominating convention for the 1854 elections. This meeting resulted in the first organization of the Republican Party in Massachusetts. Its slate was undermined by Henry Wilson's defection to the Know Nothing movement, which swept the state's elected offices that year. The Republicans reorganized in 1855, but Andrew was not involved in the party processes that resulted in the eventual election of Nathaniel Prentice Banks as the first Republican governor in 1857. He continued legal activity on behalf of anti-slavery interests.

In 1857, Andrew won election as a representative in the Massachusetts General Court, as part of a complete Republican takeover of the Massachusetts government. He was quickly promoted as a leading abolitionist voice, filling a void left after Sumner was severely injured in an attack in Congress. Andrew led the debate in favor of removing Judge Edward Loring from office over his actions in the Burns case, and in opposition to the proposed repeal of the state's stringent anti-slavery personal liberty law. Although he did not run for reelection, Andrew gained popularity as his actions became known in the state Republican party. He was selected to chair the 1858 state Republican convention. In anticipation of gaining a higher elected office, Andrew refused Governor Banks' offer of a seat on the Superior Court bench in 1859.

I pause not now to consider ... whether the enterprise of John Brown and his associates in Virginia was wise or foolish, right or wrong; I only know that, whether the enterprise itself was the one or the other, John Brown himself was right.

— Andrew, in his 1859 fund-raising appeal for John Brown's defense

Following John Brown's 1859 raid on Harpers Ferry, Virginia, Andrew helped organize legal aid for Brown. He expressed sympathy with Brown's position, if not his deeds. Andrew's efforts on behalf of Brown brought him statewide notice, and also drew the attention of Southern interests in the United States Senate. They were seeking evidence to tie Northern interests to the funding and arming of Brown's force, and Andrew was summoned to testify to his connections with Brown. Andrew led efforts to raise money to help Brown's family.

Andrew's actions on behalf of Brown and his family were highly popular in Massachusetts. The Massachusetts Republican Committee published his speeches and testimony on Brown's behalf in a pamphlet to distribute to voters.

Andrew's popularity made him the choice to head the Massachusetts delegation to the 1860 Republican National Convention. He was nominated for governor at the state convention that year, despite an attempt by the more moderate Governor Banks to secure the nomination for Henry L. Dawes. Banks sought to put off the announcement of his retirement until the last possible moment, but state Republican chairman William Claflin leaked the news to Andrew supporters. Andrew won the nomination by a wide margin, and defeated Constitutional Union Party candidate Amos A. Lawrence in the general election.

== War Governor of Massachusetts ==
When Andrew took office on January 2, 1861, on the eve of the American Civil War, the Albany Argus called him "a lawyer of a low type and a brutal fanatic" who "proposes to maintain the condemned [personal liberty] statutes of [Massachusetts], and to force upon the South by arms, an allegiance to the Constitution thus violated." In the early war years that followed, Andrew was a persistent radical voice, pressuring President Abraham Lincoln on the conduct of the war and the need to end slavery.

Shortly after taking office, Andrew began to ready the Massachusetts militia for duty, promoting younger and more vigorous leaders, and contracting for updated armaments, equipment, and supplies. He also wrote to the governors of Maine and New Hampshire, urging them to also step up preparations. Once hostilities broke out, he also took the lead to update the state's coastal defenses, which were in poor condition and largely obsolete. Taking this step without federal authorization or funding, he secured bank loans from major Boston banks to fund the effort in the interim. With the war already underway in late 1861, Andrew engaged in a highly public dispute with General Benjamin Franklin Butler, who sought to appoint officers of regiments he recruited. Andrew ended up winning in the disagreement, and (in a response viewed at the time as somewhat petulant) refused to appoint any of Butler's choices to those positions.

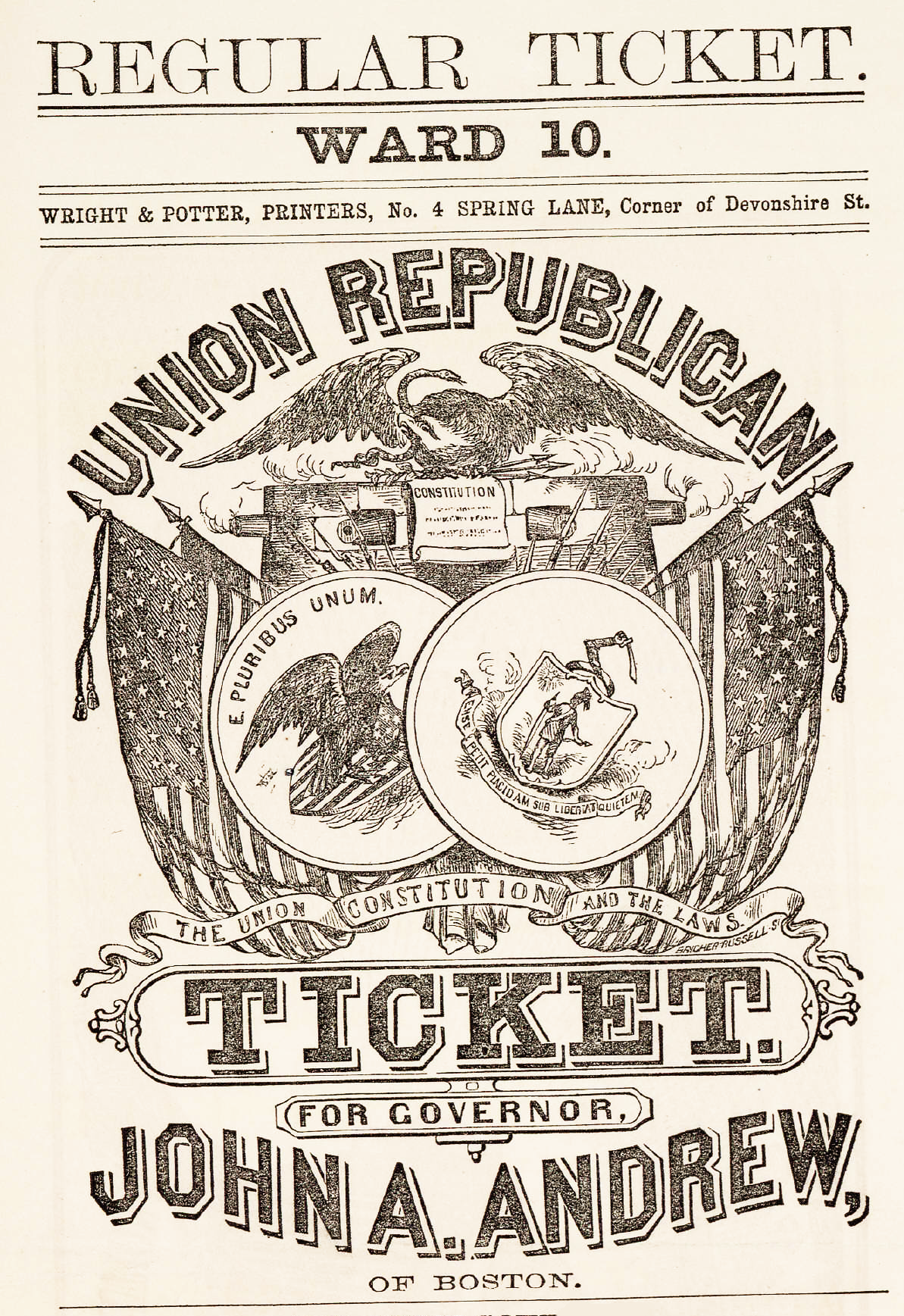
A historical election poster promoting Andrew for governor

Andrew was a regular voice, although somewhat muted in public statements, in the drive to declare an end to slavery. When Lincoln announced his Preliminary Emancipation Proclamation in September 1862 (shortly after the Union victory in the Battle of Antietam), Andrew was supportive, but called it "a poor document but a mighty act", and complained that it was too limited in scope and late in becoming effective. Still, he distributed copies of the Preliminary Emancipation Proclamation printed by John Murray Forbes to Union soldiers ahead of the final issuance. Andrew was one of the leading state executives at the Loyal War Governors' Conference in Altoona, Pennsylvania, held in late September 1862, which ultimately backed the Emancipation Proclamation and the continued war effort.

Andrew was a leading force in promoting the enlistment of black men as uniformed soldiers in the Union Army, although the state legislature was at first reluctant to authorize it. Abolitionist Frederick Douglass had advocated this from the start of the war, and Andrew viewed it as a necessary equalizing step, and a means to fill the state's enlistment quotas with something other than factory workers. After lobbying the administration, Andrew was granted permission to raise a black regiment in January 1863. Due to Massachusetts's small black population, the 54th (and then also the 55th) Massachusetts were composed of blacks recruited not just from Massachusetts, but also Ohio, New York, Pennsylvania, and other states. Andrew wanted the regiments to be staffed by black officers, but this was rejected, and their officers were instead hand-picked by Andrew from strong abolitionist circles. He was also supportive of efforts by the recruits to receive equal pay; he offered them money from the state to do so, but they refused, holding out for equal pay from the federal government. He was somewhat less receptive to the relocation of freed slaves to Massachusetts, objecting to a plan to send 500 of them to Massachusetts from South Carolina in 1862.

By the end of the war, Andrew's politics had moderated. In late 1865, he expressed support for the Reconstruction policies of President Andrew Johnson, resulting in a split with his longtime political ally Charles Sumner. The party split was such that Andrew was considered as a potential candidate for Sumner's Senate seat, but he rejected the possibility. With the war at an end in 1865, he decided not to run for reelection. In his final speech to the state legislature in January 1866 he outlined his vision of how Reconstruction should proceed, significantly diverging from the Radical agenda by not making black suffrage a prerequisite for the readmission of rebel state legislators to Congress. He had in part acted on private efforts to aid in the reconstruction of the south in 1865, forming a land agency as a clearing house for Northerners seeking to invest in the southern properties.

Andrew was elected a 3rd Class Companion (honorary member) of the Pennsylvania Commandery of the Military Order of the Loyal Legion of the United States in recognition of his support of the Union during the Civil War.

=== Domestic Massachusetts issues ===
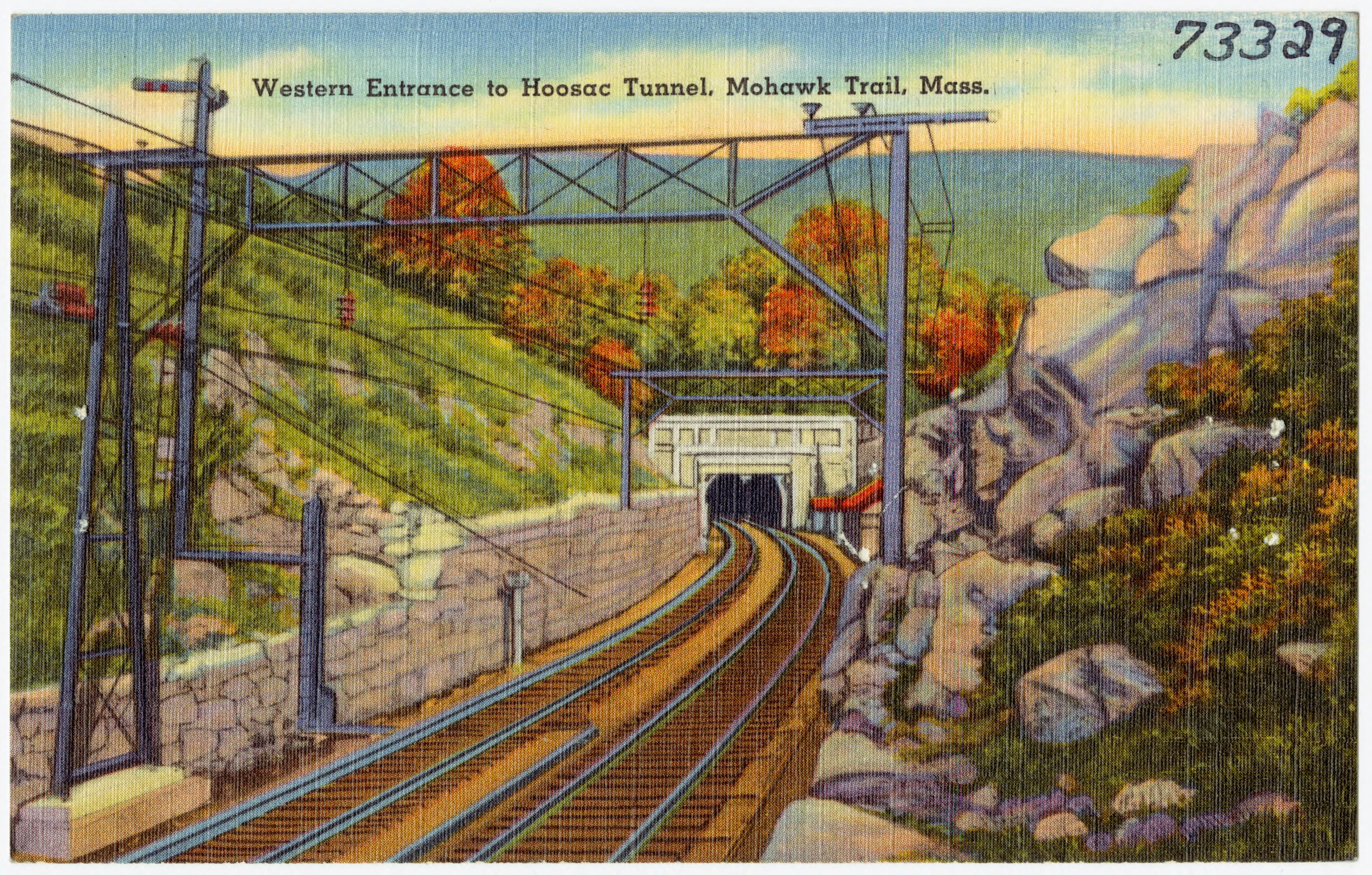
1930s postcard view of the Hoosac Tunnel

Andrew was elected with support from a large and primarily populist base. He was not part of Boston's relatively conservative aristocracy, whose support he needed to govern, especially in managing the war effort. Many of his military advisors and aides were drawn from Boston's elites, which caused some discontent among his populist supporters.

Construction of the Hoosac Tunnel was a significant issue within the state during Andrew's tenure. The state had loaned its builder, the Troy and Greenfield Railroad, $2 million in the 1850s to support the construction. In 1861, both outgoing Governor Banks, and Andrew, after he took office, refused to sign a bill authorizing additional funding to the financially troubled project. Andrew lacked confidence in Herman Haupt, the tunnel's chief engineer, and withdrew the state engineer overseeing the project. These actions cost Andrew votes in the 1861 election in the towns on the railroad route, but not enough to cost him the election. The state took over the tunnel project in 1862, and it was finally completed at great expense in 1875.

Andrew also had to contend with ongoing political activities of the nativist Know Nothings, some of whom were now in the Republican fold. The state had in 1859 enacted a constitutional amendment requiring newly naturalized citizens to wait two years before they could vote. This amendment was repealed in 1862–1863 (by a process requiring votes of consecutive legislatures and a referendum). Andrew also deliberately snubbed the sentiments of the anti-Catholic Know Nothings by signing the charter for the College of the Holy Cross, a Catholic college in Worcester, and subsequently attending its first commencement exercises. In support of the war effort, he rescinded a ban, enacted by the Know Nothing Governor Henry J. Gardner, against the formation of militia companies composed of immigrants. This made possible the formation of state units populated mainly by German and Irish immigrants. On July 14, 1863, in response to a draft riot that broke out among Irish Catholics in the North End of Boston, Andrew ordered six companies and additional regular troops to protect Union armories in the neighborhood from attempts by the rioters to raid them.

Reform elements within the Republican establishment pressed Andrew for enforcement of the state's alcohol prohibition law, which had been passed in 1855, and which had been poorly enforced, particularly in Boston. In response, legislation was enacted in 1865 and signed by Andrew creating a statewide constabulary, now the Massachusetts State Police; it was the first police force of its kind in the nation. Andrew was not a supporter of prohibition, and did little to enforce the law; his fondness of alcohol was well known.

== Post-war career ==
Andrew resumed the practice of law after leaving office, although he intended to remain active in politics. He sought the chairmanship of the state Republican Party, competing against Radicals. When President Johnson engaged in political attacks against Charles Sumner in 1866, charging him with treason, Andrew decided to withdraw from the contest.

Among Andrew's clients in 1867 were a group of businessmen who sought a loosening of the state's strict alcohol prohibition law. Even though Andrew had laxly enforced the law while governor, his successor Alexander Bullock was a strict prohibitionist, and his enforcement of the law was the strictest the state had yet seen. Andrew represented the businessmen in extensive hearings (lasting six weeks) before a legislative committee considering the issue. His promotion of the cause was seized on by Democrats in the 1867 gubernatorial campaign, in which Andrew's chief of staff John Quincy Adams II was running as a Democrat against Bullock.

Governor Andrew died on October 30, 1867, of apoplexy after having tea at his home in Boston. He was at first buried at Mount Auburn Cemetery in Cambridge, but his remains were moved in 1875 to the Hingham (Old Ship) Cemetery in Hingham. His grave is marked by a full-size statue, mounted on a pedestal.

== Honors and memorials ==
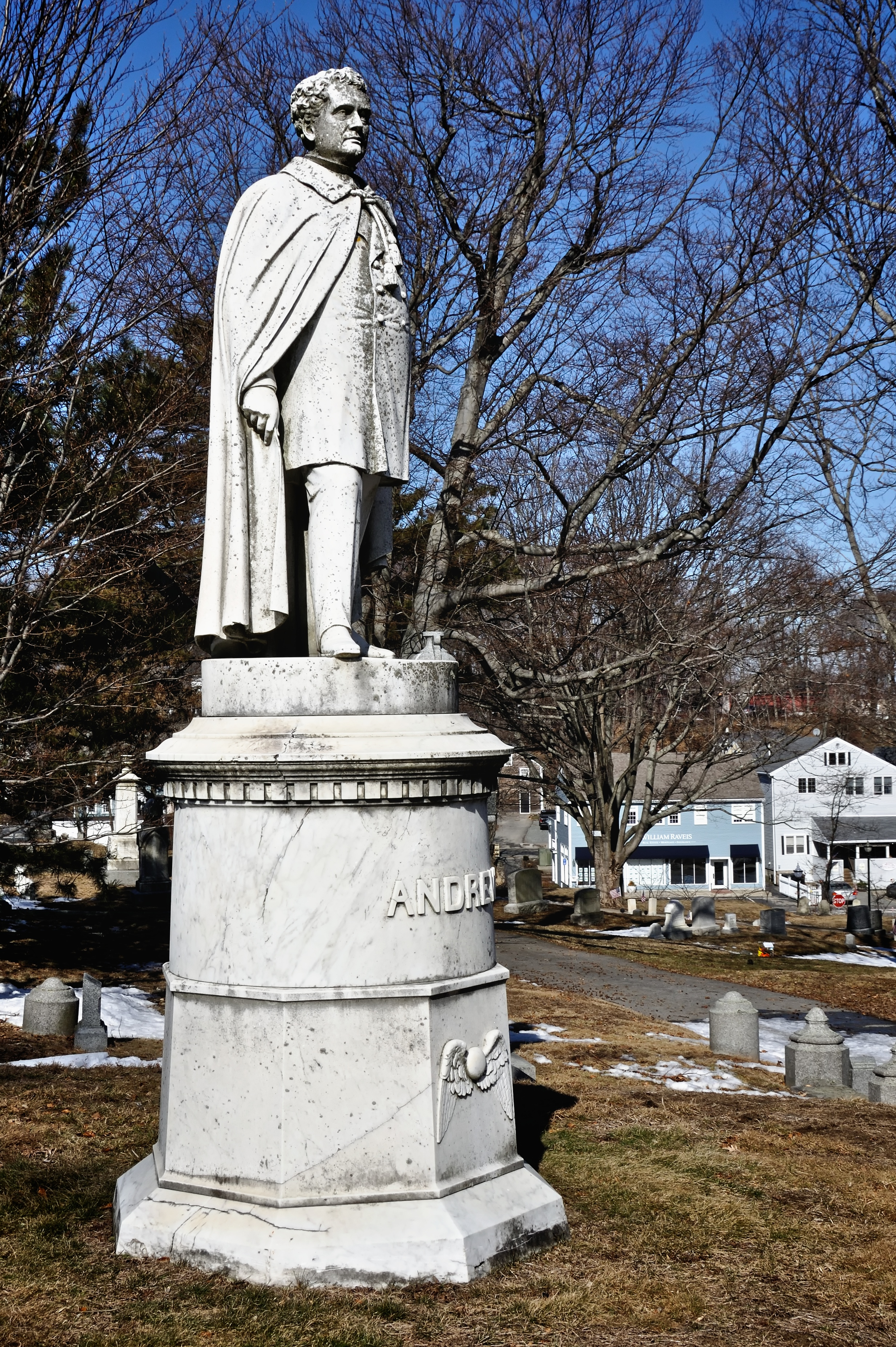
Statue of Governor Andrew, Old Ship Burying Ground, Hingham, Massachusetts

- Andrew Square in South Boston is named in his honor.
- John A. Andrew St., in the Jamaica Plain section of Boston, is named in his honor, and his name is one of four on the Soldier's Memorial in the same community (along with Lincoln, Admiral David Farragut, and General George Henry Thomas).
- John Andrew Hospital at Tuskegee University in Tuskegee, Alabama, is named for him.
- The City of Boston placed a plaque at the site of his home on Charles Street in 1924.
- In 2007, governor Deval Patrick hung Andrew's portrait over the fireplace in his office, calling him an inspiration.
- John A. Andrew School in Windham, Maine is named for him.

Party political offices
Preceded by Nathaniel P. Banks	Republican nominee for Governor of Massachusetts; 1860, 1861, 1862, 1863, 1864	Succeeded by Alexander Bullock
Political offices
Preceded by Nathaniel P. Banks	Governor of Massachusetts; January 3, 1861 – January 4, 1866	Succeeded by Alexander H. Bullock
