= 55th Massachusetts Infantry Regiment =

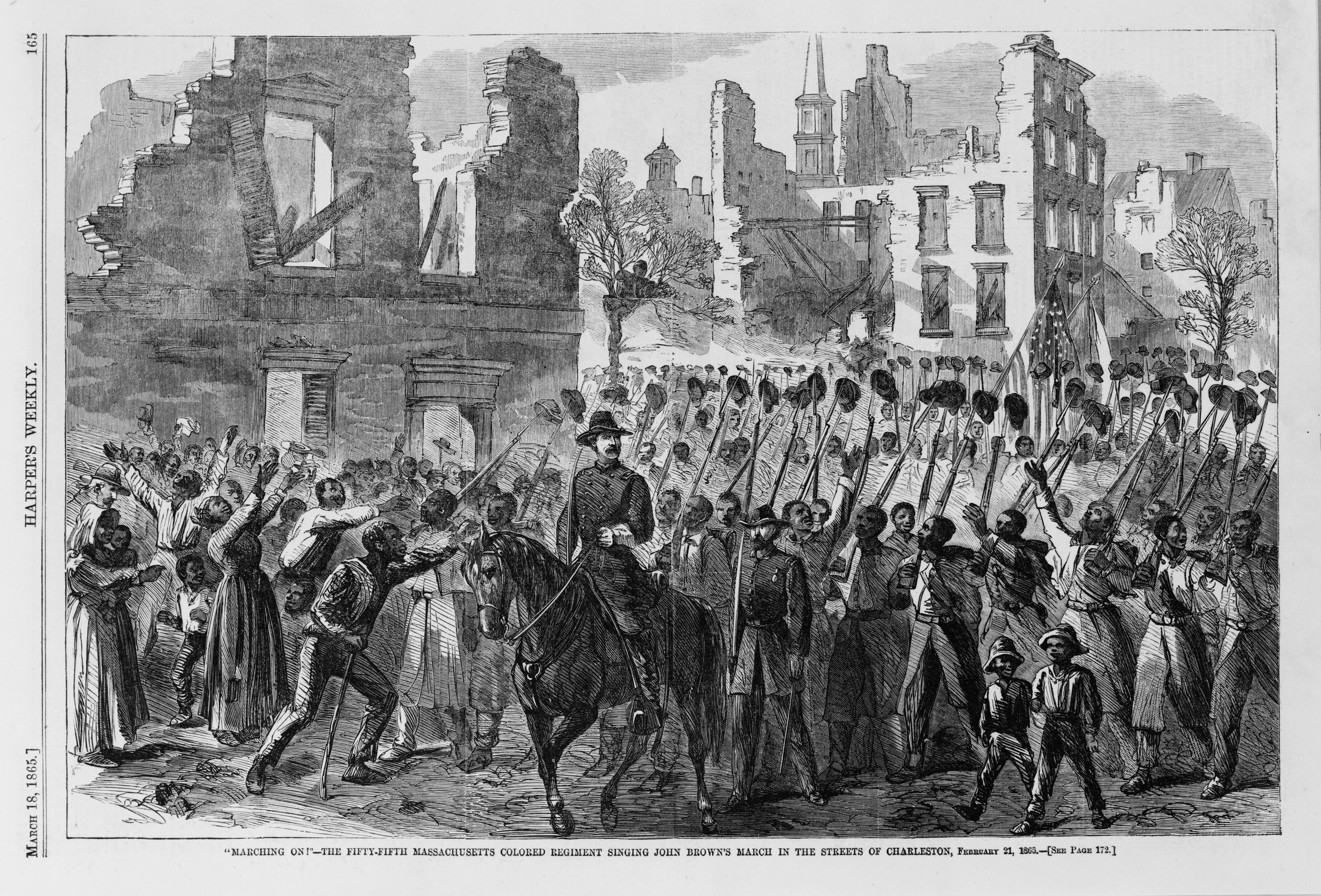
- Lieutenant Colonel Charles B. Fox leads the 55th Massachusetts into Charleston, South Carolina, February 21, 1865
- Active: June 22, 1863 – September 23, 1865
- Country: United States of America
- Allegiance: (United States) Union
- Branch: Union Army
- Type: Infantry
- Size: 1,226
- Nickname: 55th Massachusetts
- Engagements: Battle of Honey Hill, S.C.; James Island, S.C.; Deveaux Neck; Second Battle of Fort Wagner

Commanders
- Colonel: Norwood Penrose Hallowell
- Lt. Colonel: Alfred Stedman Hartwell
- Major: Charles B. Fox

The 55th Massachusetts Infantry Regiment was the sister regiment of the renowned Massachusetts 54th Volunteers during the latter half of the American Civil War, formed because of the overflow of volunteer enlistees to the 54th Massachusetts.

== History ==
=== Authorization and muster ===
The enactment of the Emancipation Proclamation by United States President Abraham Lincoln on January 1, 1863, opened the way for the enlistment of free men of color and newly liberated slaves to fight for their freedom within the Union Army. As the ranks of the 54th Massachusetts quickly reached its full complement of recruits, an overflow of colored volunteers continued to pour in from several other states outside Massachusetts — many of whom simply had not arrived in time — prompting Governor John Albion Andrew to authorize yet another regiment of colored soldiers sponsored by the Commonwealth. Lieutenant Colonel Norwood P. Hallowell of the 54th Massachusetts was promoted to colonel and appointed commander of the 55th Massachusetts on May 30, 1863. Five companies of the 55th Massachusetts were mustered into service on May 31; two more companies were mustered in on June 15; and the last three on June 22. Due to the Commonwealth's relatively small black population, both the 54th Massachusetts and, subsequently, the 55th Massachusetts, were made up of free men of color recruited from other states, including Ohio, New York, and Pennsylvania. The State of Ohio provided 222 recruits to the 55th Massachusetts, more than any other northern state. Among these was James Monroe Trotter of Chillicothe, Ohio, father of William Monroe Trotter, an early civil rights activist and a co-founder of the Niagara Movement, the direct predecessor to the NAACP. William Monroe Trotter was also a graduate of Harvard University and numbered among the 100 Greatest African Americans as compiled by Molefi Kete Asante, Ph.D.

Although Union forces achieved a victory at the Battle of Antietam in September 1862, two years of war had taken a great toll in men and resources. Free men of color had remained largely excluded from taking up arms as soldiers in the defense of the Union and their own continued liberty. In his Pulitzer Prize–winning book Battle Cry of Freedom, historian James M. McPherson wrote: "Despite the service of black soldiers in the [American] Revolution and the War of 1812, Negroes had been barred from state militias since 1792 and the regular army had never enrolled black soldiers. The prejudices of the old order died hard." In a speech delivered on March 21, 1863, the great abolitionist orator Frederick Douglass recounted how he had "...implored the imperiled nation to unchain against her foes, her powerful black hand." Under the leadership of Governor Andrew, the Commonwealth of Massachusetts took decisive action to do just that. Both the 54th and the 55th regiments were mustered in at Camp Meigs in Readville, Massachusetts, near Boston, and were trained there in that camp.

=== Deployment and action ===
From the 54th Massachusetts, officers Norwood Penrose Hallowell and Alfred Stedman Hartwell were promoted and mustered in as Colonel and Lieutenant Colonel, respectively, to lead the newly formed regiment, with Charles Barnard Fox of the 2nd Massachusetts Cavalry mustered in as major. Together with the 2nd and 3rd North Carolina Colored Volunteers (which later became renumbered as the 36th and 37th U.S. Colored Troops respectively), it was a part of "Wild's African Brigade" led by Edward A. Wild for much of the war.

Following departure from Boston for North Carolina and before seeing action in battle, Colonel Hallowell took a furlough to the north in order to seek treatment of a severe wound he had suffered at Antietam, and ultimately resigned his commission never to return to active duty. In turn, officers Hartwell and Fox were promoted to lead the regiment as Colonel and Lt. Colonel, respectively, with Sigourney Wales mustered in as major. Coincidentally, the newly formed regiment received its regimental colors from Governor Andrew on July 18, 1863, the very day that the Massachusetts 54th launched its fateful assault on Fort Wagner at Morris Island, South Carolina.

The regiment carried 5 banners, 2 national flags, a blue regimental flag and 2 guidons. All being presented by the group of African-American women from Ohio, with them being made by the Shillito & Co. in Cincinnati. The National flag from Ohio bore the inscription: "God and Liberty." While the other National flag had the name of the regiment written across the stripes in gold.

The brigade, headquartered in Norfolk, comprised the 55th Massachusetts, and the 2nd and 3rd North Carolina Colored Volunteers (which later became renumbered as the 36th and 37th U.S. Colored Troops respectively). Wild's men served in the Charleston, South Carolina, area and saw action in numerous skirmishes and battles in that region, including an expedition to South Mills and Camden Court House in December.

Transferred to the Army of the Potomac in 1864, Wild and his black soldiers participated in the Overland Campaign and the subsequent Siege of Petersburg, Wild's men constructed and manned Fort Pocahontas, an earthen-walled Virginia fort on the James River that during the Battle of Wilson's Wharf withstood an attack on May 24 by Fitzhugh Lee's Confederates.

In early 1865, Wild's men performed picket duty along the Appomattox River. They were a part of the large force of black troops under Godfrey Weitzel that occupied the former Confederate national capital, Richmond, Virginia, holding that city through the end of the war. Wild's men were among those troops who witnessed the historic visit of President Abraham Lincoln to Richmond following the city's fall to the Union forces.

== Working conditions and service ==
At the time of formation, the colored troops of Massachusetts were promised a pay rate of $13.00 per month, equal to that of all other active recruits throughout the Union Army. This promise was not initially honored, principally due to inaction of the U.S. Congress. On principle, these men almost unanimously chose to forgo their pay altogether until this discrepancy was fully rectified. And according to the Civil War Index: "Like the 54th, a grave injustice was done the men of the 55th in the matter of pay, as the Federal paymasters offered the men but $10 a month. This, they consistently refused to accept, and serious trouble with the men was narrowly averted in consequence." By one account, James Monroe Trotter "was the first soldier to step forth and say to the paymaster 'No, sir; we'll never take it. We are soldiers, we will accept nothing less than the soldier's pay. We are perfectly willing to take the soldier's fare, but we will not degrade the name of an American soldier.'" This circumstance persisted for a period of eighteen months before the matter was finally settled through action taken by the War Department.

== Notable engagements ==
The 54th Massachusetts and the 55th Massachusetts brigaded together, fighting and dying side by side during the campaign at Honey Hill, South Carolina, on November 30, 1864. The 55th Massachusetts was one of the first Union regiments to enter the captured city of Charleston, South Carolina.

== Public impact ==
In her 1995 article 'History of 55th Massachusetts Volunteer Infantry', Civil War historian Katherine Dhalle stated: "The war that had taken so many lives had also seen fit to form many survivors into the leaders of a new, reunited country. Despite frustrations, disappointments, obstacles, and restrictions, the men of the 55th bore their military office well. Instead of retreating in the face of adversity, whether it be the enemy, their fellow officers, or their own government, they continued in their quest to promote freedom and preserve the Union at all costs. For this they deserve our unending respect and admiration. As well, the brave men of the regiment, both black and white, who fought side by side, and lived through the inequities of a discriminatory government, deserve to be remembered as the heroes they are. Nothing less would be acceptable."

== Notable soldiers and officers ==
- Colonel Norwood P. Hallowell
- Lieutenant James Monroe Trotter had been mustered in to the regiment as a private, promoted to sergeant major and ultimately attained the rank of 2nd lieutenant, one of first men of color to receive a commission in U.S. Military during the Civil War. His brother-in-law, William Dupree, and John Freeman Shorter, both Sergeants and men of color, were also mustered into the regiment as 2nd Lieutenants. However, despite these notable achievements, Lt. J.M. Trotter wrote: "There is much feeling in the Regiment among the officers against these promotions of colored men in Regiments with white officers; but all the best officers are in favor of it...Some talk of resigning on account of these promotions. I cannot say that they will do so...I do not know how it will all turn out, but Dupree and I will try to do our duty as officers let prejudice be as great as it may." Echoing these sentiments, Lt. John F. Shorter in reading the regiment's resolutions, called upon his fellow brave soldiers of color to fulfill their first duty as men, to "prove our fitness for liberty and citizenship, in the new order of things now arising in this, our native land."
- Sergeant Nicholas Said (b. Bornu Empire 1836, d. Alabama 1882) was a translator of Arabic, Turkish, Russian, and French. Although no one in his ancestry was ever enslaved in the Americas, he elected to immigrate to the United States and to join the 55th Regiment.
- Joshua Dunbar, a former slave and father of renowned American poet Paul Laurence Dunbar, served in both the 55th Massachusetts and the 5th Regiment, Massachusetts Cavalry (Colored). In honor of newly liberated slaves and free men of color who fought and died in defense of nationhood and freedom, Paul Lawrence Dunbar would pen two poems, entitled "The Colored Soldiers" and "When Dey 'Listed Colored Soldiers."
- George Thompson Garrison, eldest son of internationally acclaimed American abolitionist William Lloyd Garrison, enlisted in the Fifty-fifth Colored Regiment of Massachusetts Volunteers and mustered in as a 2nd lieutenant, ultimately attaining the rank of captain.
- Captain Charles Pickering Bowditch, later financier, archaeologist, cryptographer and linguist
- Thomas F. Ellsworth (Company B), received a Medal of Honor for carrying his injured superior officer from the Battle of Honey Hill.
- Second Lieutenant Ezra Palmer Gould, later an Episcopal priest
- Chaplain William Jackson, a Baptist minister who served from July 1863 to January 1864
- Second Lieutenant Charles Lewis Mitchell, later one of the first two African Americans to serve in the Massachusetts state legislature
- Captain William Nutt, later politician and banker
- Corporal Andrew Jackson Smith (Medal of Honor), received a Medal of Honor for taking and keeping the colors after the color bearer fell at the Battle of Honey Hill.
- Surgeon Burt Green Wilder
- Matthew M. Lewey, judge, state rep., mayor, publisher, editor, and militia leader in Florida.
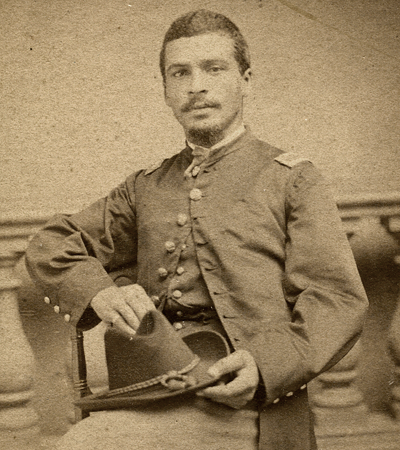
  2nd Lt. James Monroe Trotter
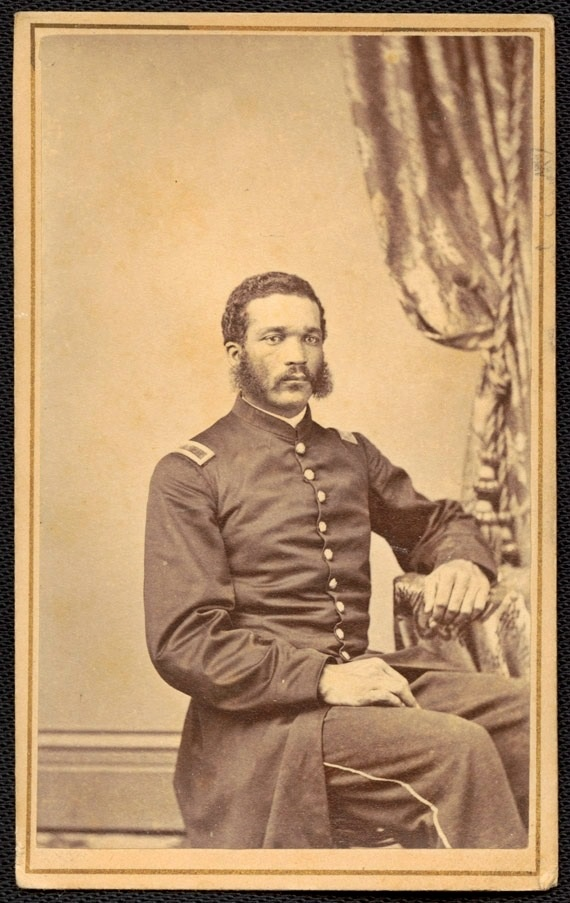
  2nd Lt. William H. Dupree
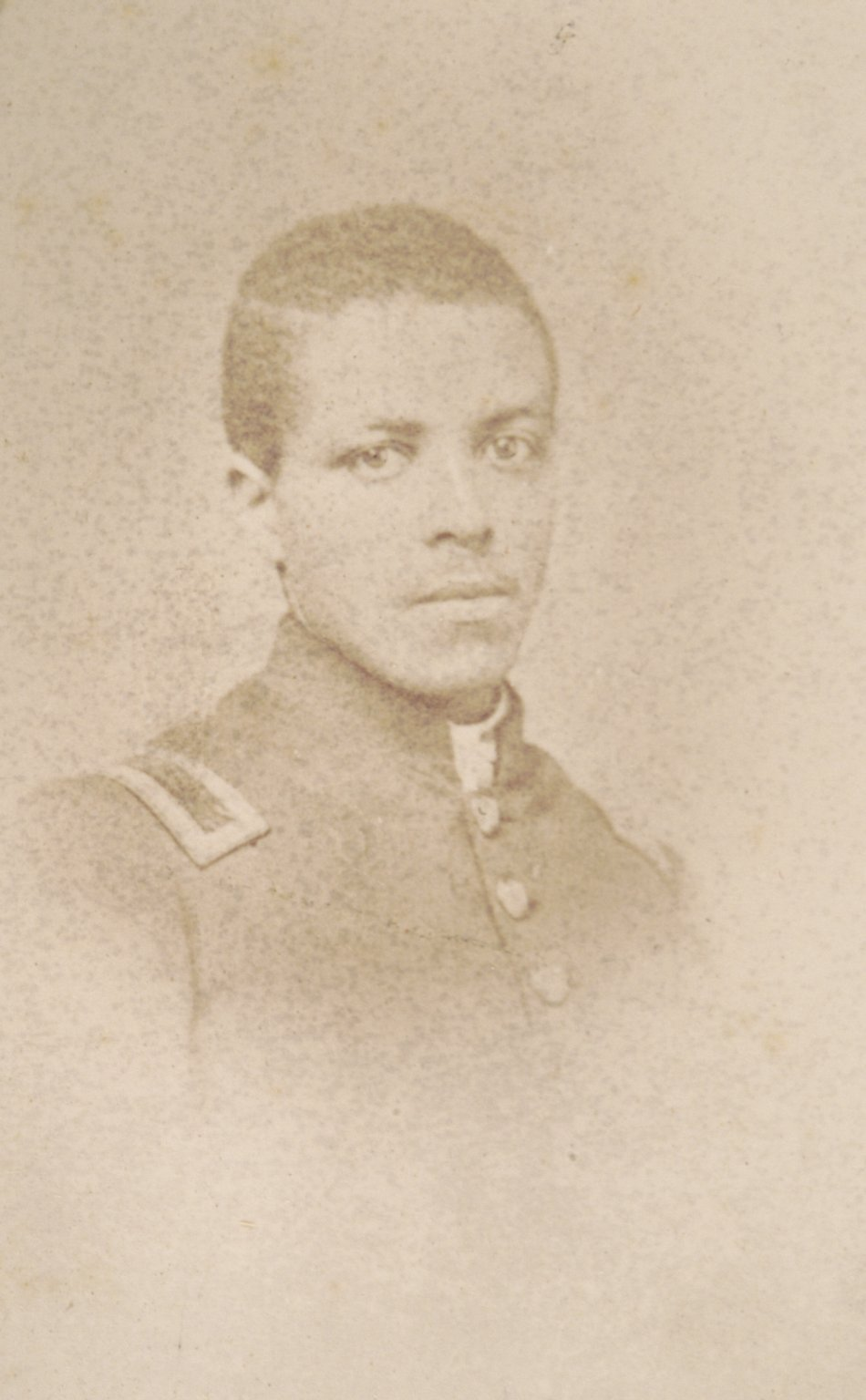
  2nd Lt. John Freeman Shorter
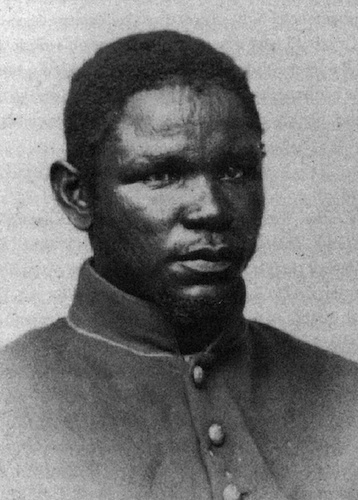
  Sergeant Nicholas Said
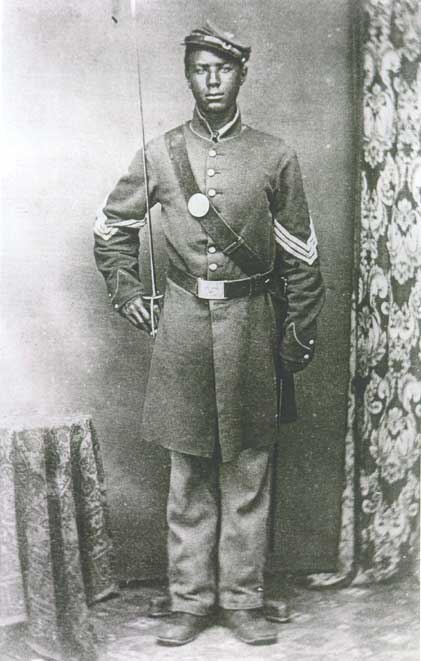
  Sgt Andrew Jackson Smith MOH

== See also ==
- List of Massachusetts Civil War units
- Freedman
- Abolitionism in New Bedford, Massachusetts
- Frederick Douglass
