= Mandara people =

Central African ethnic group

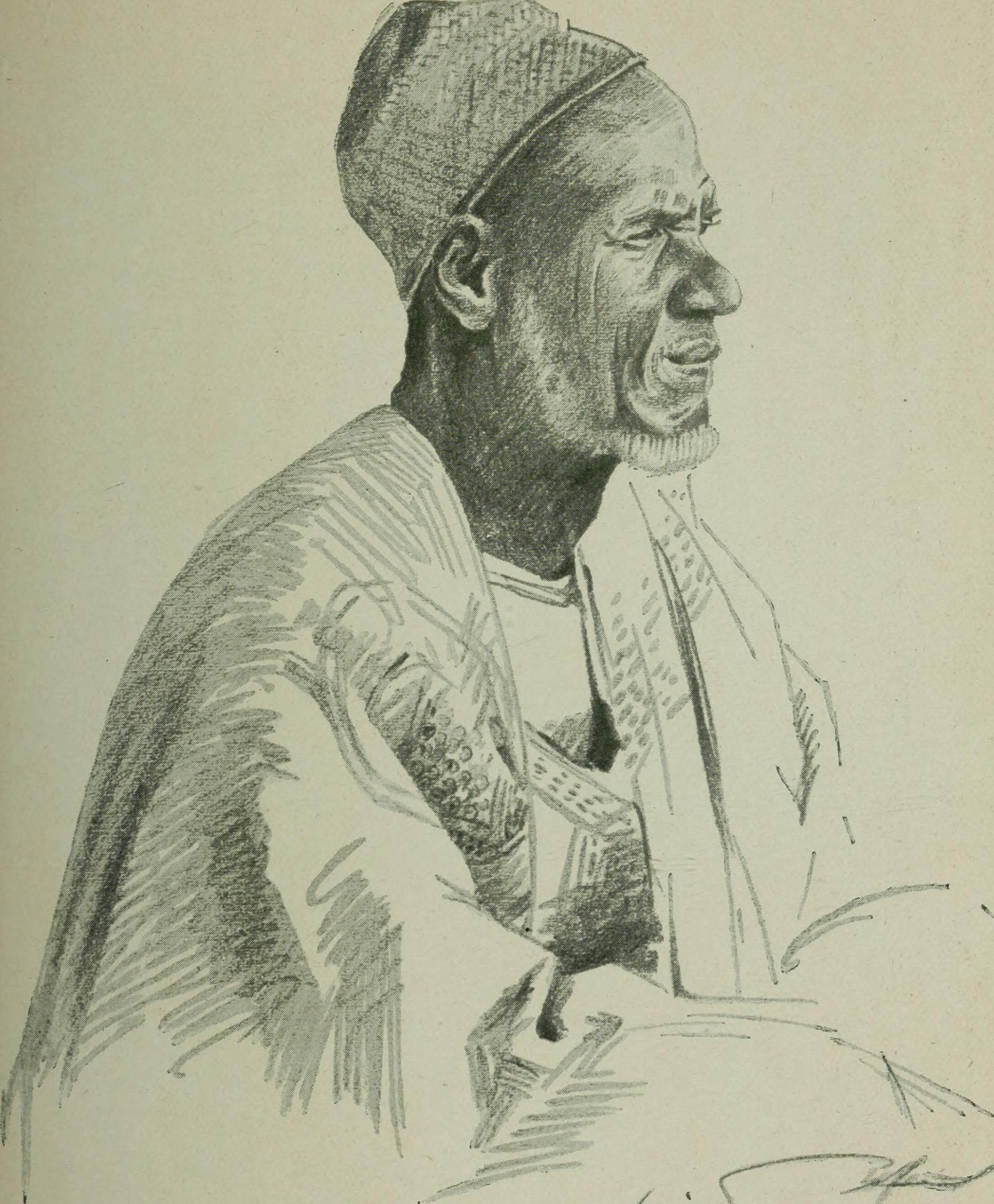
- Mandara people were a part of a Sultanate

Regions with significant populations
- Cameroon: 75,000
- Nigeria: 21,000

Languages
- Wandala language

Religion
- Sunni Islam

Related ethnic groups
- Mura people, Malgwa people

The Mandara people, also known as Wandala or Mandwara, are a Central African traditionalist ethnic group found in north Cameroon, northeastern Nigeria, and southeastern Chad. They speak the Wandala language, which belongs to the Chadic branch of the Afro-Asiatic Language family.

Their origins are unclear. They live in the mountainous region and valleys north of the Benue River in Cameroon, and have long been a part of the Mandara Sultanate. Their region witnessed slave trading and sub-Saharan caravans till the 19th century. The Mandara people were known for their horse raising and iron working skills, and featured a society that was socially stratified.

== History ==
The origins of the Mandara people are in the Mandara Kingdom, once found in the Mandara Mountains, along the northern Cameroon at its border with northeastern Nigeria between the Benue River and Mora, Cameroon.

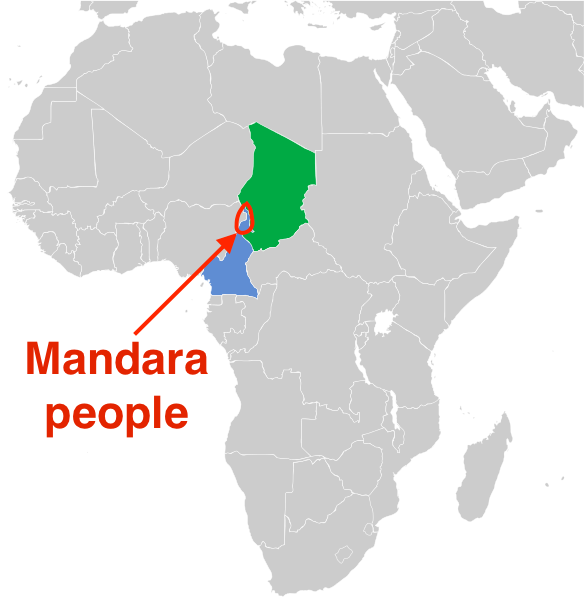
Mandara people distribution in Sahel (approx).

Their prehistory is unclear. One oral traditions trace their start to a king Agamakiya in the 13th century, who led them as invasions came from the Sahel. They converted to Sunni Islam under Sultan Bukar Aaji in the 1720s. Another tradition states Wandala Mbra was one of the sons of Mbra of Turu and Katala, the daughter of Vaya, he adopted Islam and it is his lineage that formed this patrilineal Muslim ethnic group. These oral traditions may have been reconstructed later, when Mandara came under the influence of and cooperated in Fulani jihads, slave raids on other ethnic groups.

Islamic historians mention the Mandara people, but also provide inconsistent accounts of their history. One account by Ibn Fartuwa states that they were unbelievers, but they converted to Islam in the 16th century. Another account states that It is their ruler who invited two Moroccans from Fez returning from Mecca, to stay with him. They converted him, and he then mandated the Islamic traditions of circumcision, prayer, zakat and fasting among his Mandara people in early 18th-century. Between the 18th and 19th centuries, the Mandara people's region was surrounded by pagan people, and these were a source of slaves through raiding, and for trade to the African slave caravans.

== Society and culture ==
Their historic lands have been midst a densely populated river valley surrounded by volcanic mountains rich in iron ore, famed as a horse breeding area. Their Sultans have had Mora in Cameroon as their capital. The Mandara people have lived in dispersed villages, each with a mosque, growing sorghum as their principal crop and producing iron tools that were sought by traders and other ethnic groups. The Mandara people wear Muslim dress typically of northern Africa, and they carry leather amulets around their neck that contains verses from the Quran.

The Mandara society developed into a socially stratified system, with Sultan and royalty, farmers, horse breeders, artisans, iron workers and smiths forming a distinct endogamous occupation-inheriting castes. The caste system among the Mandara people integrated the concept that the strata have innate pollution and therefore they are stigmatized, however there is no evidence that their Islamic belief integrated the differences between the socially differentiated castes in their society to have been divinely sanctioned.
