= List of colonial governors of Cameroon =

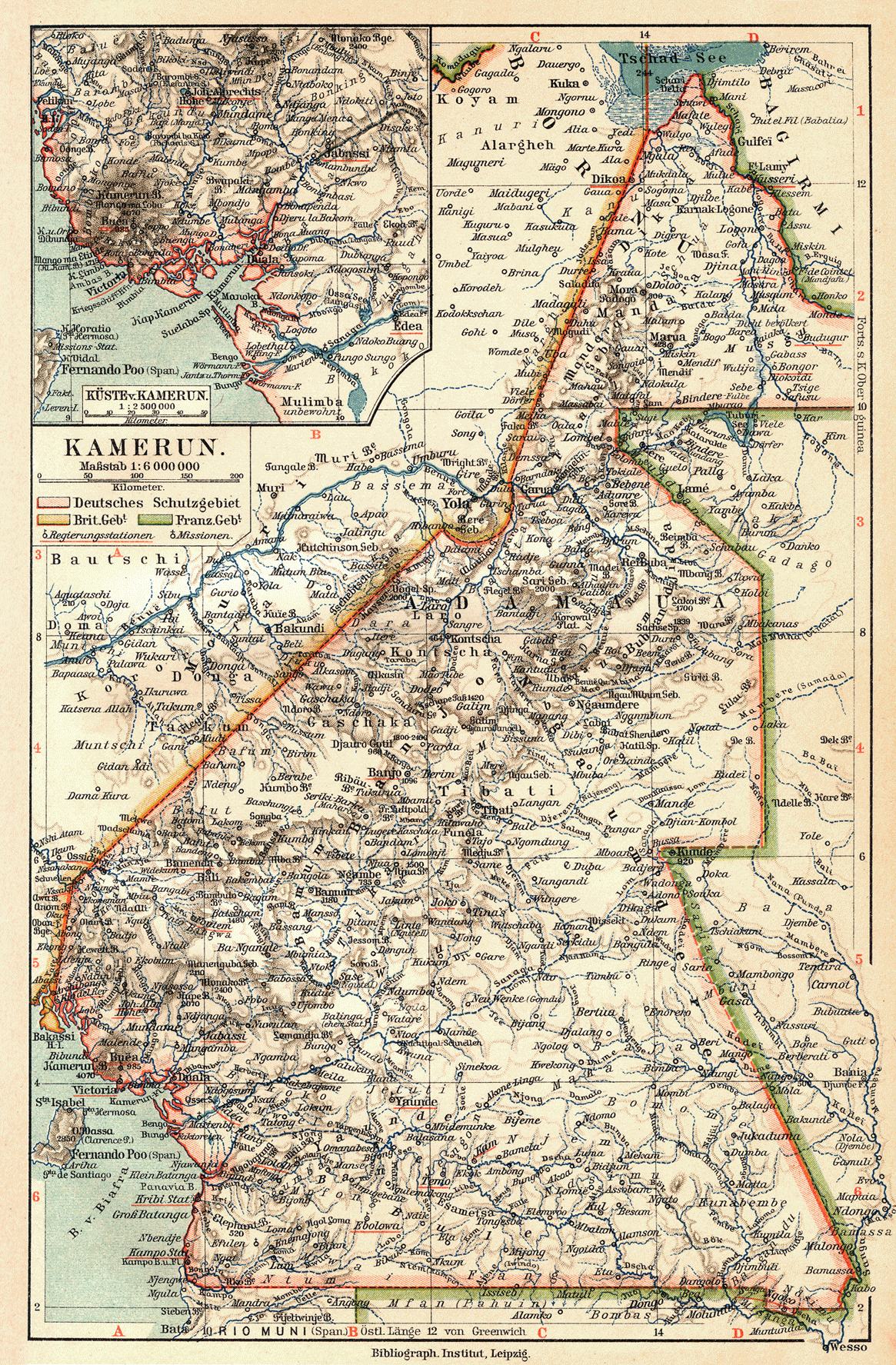
German Cameroon (bordered in red), 1905.

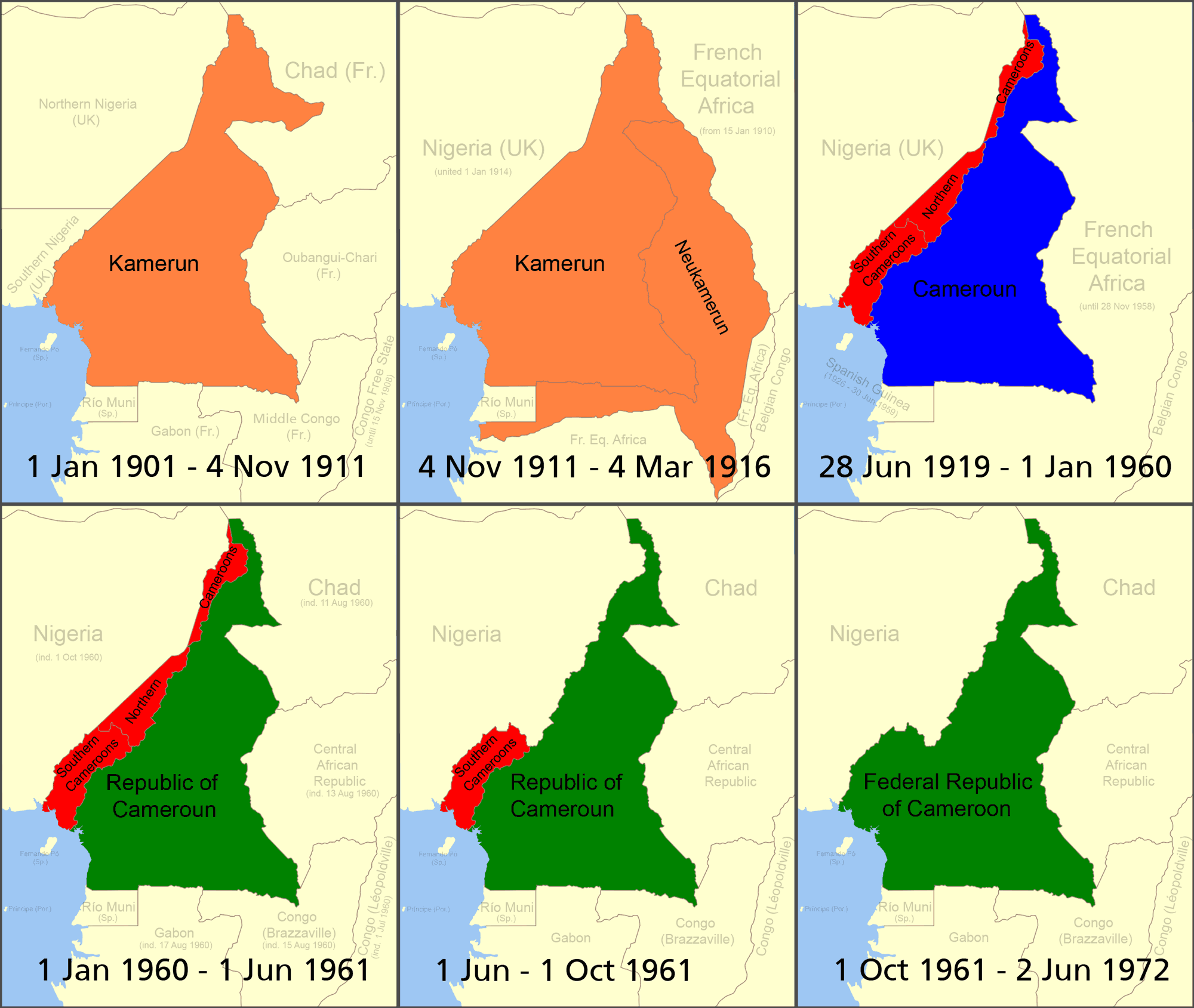
Cameroon 1901–1972 German Cameroon British Cameroon French Cameroon Republic of Cameroon

This article lists the colonial governors of Cameroon. It encompasses the period when the country was under colonial rule of the German Empire (as Kamerun), military occupation of the territory by the Allies of World War I (during the Kamerun campaign of the African theatre), as well as the period when it was a Class B League of Nations mandate and a United Nation trust territory, under the administration of France (as French Cameroon) and the United Kingdom (as British Cameroons) respectively.

== List ==
(Dates in italics indicate de facto continuation of office)

=== German Kamerun ===
Tenure	Portrait	Incumbent	Notes
14 July 1884 to 19 July 1884		Gustav Nachtigal, Kommissar	Commissioner
19 July 1884 to 1 April 1885		Maximilian Buchner, acting Kommissar	acting Commissioner
1 April 1885 to 4 July 1885		Eduard von Knorr, acting Kommissar	acting Commissioner
4 July 1885 to 14 February 1891		Julius von Soden, Governor	
13 May 1887 to 4 October 1887		Jesko von Puttkamer, acting Governor	Acting for Soden, 1st time
4 October 1887 to 17 January 1888		Eugen von Zimmerer, acting Governor	Acting for Soden, 1st time
26 December 1889 to 17 April 1890		Eugen von Zimmerer, acting Governor	Acting for Soden, 2nd time
17 April 1890 to 3 August 1890		Markus Graf von Pfeil, acting Governor	Acting for Soden
3 August 1890 to 14 August 1890		Kurz, acting Governor	Acting for Soden
14 August 1890 to 2 December 1890		Jesko von Puttkamer, acting Governor	Acting for Soden, 2nd time
2 December 1890 to 15 April 1891		Heinrich Leist, acting Governor	Acting for Soden to 14 February 1891, 1st time
15 April 1891 to 13 August 1895		Eugen von Zimmerer, Governor	
7 August 1891 to 5 January 1892		Bruno von Schuckmann, acting Governor	Acting for Zimmerer
27 June 1893 to 24 February 1894		Heinrich Leist, acting Governor	Acting for Zimmerer, 2nd time
31 December 1894 to 27 March 1895		Jesko von Puttkamer, acting Governor	Acting for Zimmerer, 3rd time
27 March 1895 to 4 May 1895		von Lucke, acting Governor	Acting for Zimmerer
13 August 1895 to 9 May 1907		Jesko von Puttkamer, Governor	
27 October 1895 to 10 September 1897		Theodor Seitz, acting Governor	Acting for Puttkamer, 1st time
12 January 1898 to 13 October 1898		Theodor Seitz, acting Governor	Acting for Puttkamer, 2nd time
17 January 1900 to 31 July 1900		August Köhler, acting Governor	Acting for Puttkamer
1 August 1900 to 6 September 1900		Emil Diehl, acting Governor	Acting for Puttkamer
6 September 1900 to 15 November 1900		Oltwig von Kamptz, acting Governor	Acting for Puttkamer
3 February 1902 to 3 October 1902		Albert Plehn, acting Governor	Acting for Puttkamer
9 May 1904 to 8 November 1904		Karl Ebermaier, acting Governor	Acting for Puttkamer
9 November 1904 to 31 January 1905		Otto Gleim, acting Governor	Acting for Puttkamer, 1st time
January 1906 to November 1906		Franz Ludwig Wilhelm Müller, acting Governor	Acting for Puttkamer
November 1906 to 9 May 1907		Otto Gleim, acting Governor	Acting for Puttkamer, 2nd time
9 May 1907 to 27 August 1910		Theodor Seitz, Governor	
10 February 1909 to October 1909		Wilhelm Peter Hansen, acting Governor	Acting for Seitz, 1st time
28 August 1910 to 29 January 1912		Otto Gleim, Governor	
August 1910 to September 1910		Theodor Steinhausen, acting Governor	Acting for Gleim
September 1910 to 25 October 1910		Wilhelm Peter Hansen, acting Governor	Acting for Gleim, 2nd time
October 1911 to 29 January 1912		Wilhelm Peter Hansen, acting Governor	Acting for Gleim, 3rd time
29 January 1912 to 4 March 1916		Karl Ebermaier, Governor	
9 October 1913 to 1914		August Full, acting Governor	Acting for Ebermaier
(26 September 1914)	Occupation by Great Britain and France begins		
4 March 1916	Germany surrenders territory to occupying powers		

=== Allied occupation of German Kamerun ===
Tenure	Portrait	Incumbent	Notes
26 August 1914 to 7 April 1916		Joseph Gaudérique Aymerich, Military Commander	Military Commander of French Cameroon
7 April 1916 to 8 October 1916		Joseph Gaudérique Aymerich, Administrator	Administrator of French Cameroon
8 October 1916 to 6 March 1919		Lucien Louis Fourneau, Administrator	Administrator of French Cameroon
6 March 1919 to 28 June 1919		Jules Carde, Commissioner	Commissioner of French Cameroon
28 June 1919	Formal division into French and British Cameroons		

=== French Cameroon ===
Tenure	Portrait	Incumbent	Notes
French-occupied territory
7 April 1916 to 8 October 1916		Joseph Gaudérique Aymerich, Administrator	
8 October 1916 to 6 March 1919		Lucien Louis Fourneau, Administrator	
6 March 1919 to 20 July 1922		Jules Carde, Commissioner	Acting to 7 December 1919
French Cameroons (League of Nations mandate)
20 July 1922 to March 1923		Jules Carde, Commissioner	
September 1920 to June 1921		Paul Auguste François Bonnecarrère, acting Commissioner	Acting for Carde
March 1923 to 29 April 1923		Albéric Auguste Fournier, acting Commissioner	
29 April 1923 to 31 August 1932		Théodore Paul Marchand, Commissioner	1st time
27 December 1924 to 11 May 1925		Ernest Augustin Bleu, acting Commissioner	Acting for Marchand, 1st time
2 March 1926 to 31 October 1926		Ernest Augustin Bleu, acting Commissioner	Acting for Marchand, 2nd time
26 April 1929 to 26 October 1929		Ernest Augustin Bleu, acting Commissioner	Acting for Marchand, 3rd time
19 June 1931 to 6 February 1932		Ernest Augustin Bleu, acting Commissioner	Acting for Marchand, 4th time
31 August 1932 to 7 July 1934		Paul Auguste François Bonnecarrère, Commissioner	Acting to 22 September 1932
7 July 1934 to 1936		Jules Vincent Repiquet, Commissioner	
1936 to January 1937		Gaston Camille Guibet, acting Commissioner	
January 1937 to 16 November 1938		Pierre François Boisson, Commissioner	
7 October 1937 to 9 March 1938		Pierre Émile Aubert, acting Commissioner	Acting for Boisson
16 November 1938 to 27 August 1940		Richard Edmond Maurice Édouard Brunot, Commissioner	
27 August 1940 to 20 November 1940		Philippe Leclerc de Hauteclocque, Governor	
20 November 1940 to 20 July 1943		Pierre Charles Albert Cournarie, Governor	
20 July 1943 to 15 November 1944		Hubert Eugène Paul Carras, Governor	
15 November 1944 to 16 January 1946		Henri Pierre Nicolas, Governor	
16 January 1946 to 16 March 1946		Adrien Émile Amédée Léger, acting Governor	
16 March 1946 to 13 December 1946		Robert Delavignette, High Commissioner	
French Cameroons (United Nations trust territory)
13 December 1946 to 25 March 1947		Robert Delavignette, High Commissioner	
25 March 1947 to April 1947		Robert Casimir, acting High Commissioner	1st time
April 1947 to 7 July 1949		René Hoffherr, High Commissioner	
7 July 1949 to 10 January 1950		Robert Casimir, acting High Commissioner	2nd time
10 January 1950 to 2 December 1954		Jean Louis Marie André Soucadoux, High Commissioner	
2 December 1954 to 17 April 1956		Roland Joanes Louis Pré, High Commissioner	
17 April 1956 to 29 January 1958		Pierre Messmer, High Commissioner	
29 January 1958 to 19 February 1958		Jean Paul Ramadier, High Commissioner	
19 February 1958 to 1 January 1960		Xavier Antoine Torre, High Commissioner	
1 January 1960	Independence as Republic of Cameroon		

=== British Cameroons ===
Tenure	Portrait	Incumbent	Notes
British-occupied territory
1916		Kenneth V. Elphinstone, Resident	
1916 to 1917		E. C. Duff, Resident	
1917 to 1919		P. V. Young, Resident	
1919		W. G. Ambrose, Resident	
1919		John C. Maxwell, Resident	
1919 to 20 July 1920		Sir John H. Davidson, Resident	
British Cameroons (League of Nations mandate)
20 July 1920 to 1921?		Sir John H. Davidson, Resident	
1921 to 1925		Fitz Herbert Ruxton, Senior Resident	
1925		William Edgar Hunt, acting District Officer	
1925 to 1928		Edward John Arnett, Senior Resident	1st time
1928 to 1929		H. J. Aveling, acting Resident	
1929 to 1932		Edward John Arnett, Resident	2nd time
1932 to 1933		Frederick Bernard Carr, District Officer	
1933		George Hugo Findlay, Senior Resident	
1933 to 1935		John Wynne Corrie Rutherfoord, Resident	
1935 to 1938		O. W. Firth, Senior Resident	
1938 to 1939		Ludlow Sealy-King, acting Resident	1st time
1939 to 1942		Arthur Evelyn Francis Murray, Senior Resident	
1942 to 1943		Ludlow Sealy-King, Resident	2nd time
1943 to 194?		James Macrae Simpson, Resident	
194? to 25 February 1945		Percy Graham Harris, Resident	
20 March 1945 to 10 October 1945		Alfred Leeming, Senior District Officer	
1945		Reuben John Hook, acting Resident	
1945 to 1946		Frank B. Bridges, Resident	
14 February 1946 to 13 December 1946		Neil Mackenzie, Senior District Officer	
British Cameroons (United Nations trust territory)
13 December 1946 to 4 August 1949		Neil Mackenzie, Senior District Officer	
25 August 1949 to 31 December 1949		Doyle Arthur Fitzroy Shute, Senior Resident	
1949 to 1 October 1954		Edward John Gibbons, Special Resident	
1 October 1954	Autonomous territory within Colony and Protectorate of Nigeria		
1 October 1954 to 1956		Edward John Gibbons, Commissioner	
1956 to 1 October 1961		John Osbaldiston Field, Commissioner	
1 June 1961	Northern British Cameroons incorporated into Federation of Nigeria		
1 October 1961	Southern British Cameroons incorporated into Republic of Cameroon		

For continuation after independence, see: List of presidents of Cameroon

== See also ==
- President of Cameroon
  - List of presidents of Cameroon
- Prime Minister of Cameroon
  - List of prime ministers of Cameroon
- List of heads of government of French Cameroon
- List of heads of government of British Cameroons
- History of Cameroon
- Politics of Cameroon
