= List of heads of government of British Cameroons =

This is a list of heads of government of British Cameroons

Tenure	Incumbent	Affiliation	Notes
1 October 1954 to 1 February 1959	E. M. L. Endeley, Premier		
1 February 1959 to 1 October 1961	John Ngu Foncha, Premier	KDNP	

== Affiliations ==
KNDP	Kamerun National Democratic Party British Cameroon-based

== See also ==
- Cameroon
  - Politics of Cameroon
  - Heads of state of Cameroon
  - Heads of government of Cameroon
  - Colonial heads of British Cameroon (Cameroons)
  - Colonial heads of French Cameroon (Cameroun)
  - Heads of government of French Cameroon (Cameroun)
  - Colonial heads of German Cameroon (Kamerun)
  - Colonial heads of Ambas Bay (Victoria Colony)
- Lists of office-holders
