= William Ames (politician) =

Military and political leader from Rhode Island

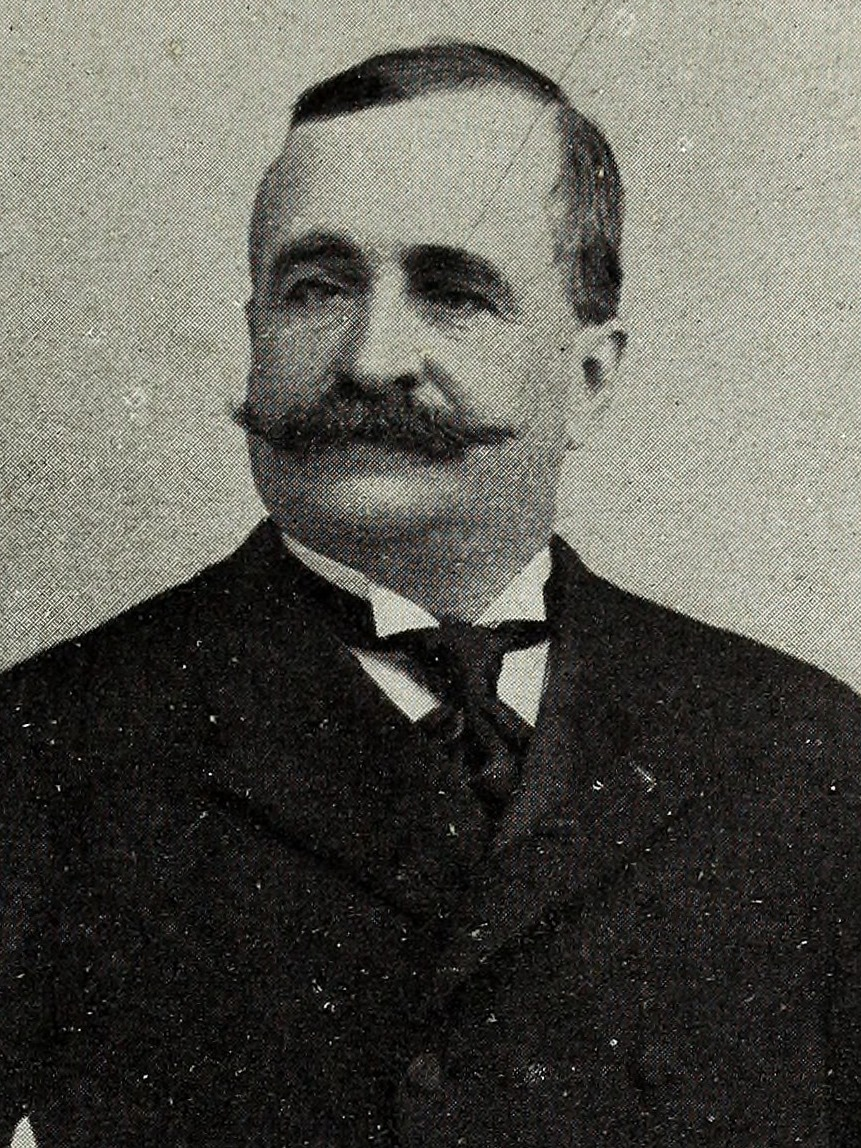

William Ames (May 15, 1842 – March 1914) was a Union army officer during the American Civil War, a businessman, and a politician in Rhode Island. He married the widowed Ann Ives Carrington Dwight. He served in the Rhode Island House of Representatives.

Born in Providence, Rhode Island, he was one of Judge Samuel Ames's sons, and attended Brown University. He married Harriette Fletcher Ormsbee and then Anne Ives Carrington, widow of Gamaliel Lyman Dwight.

His wife attended a reception at the Slater memorial homestead donated to Brown University for a women's dormitory by Mrs. Horatio N. Slater.

== Civil War ==
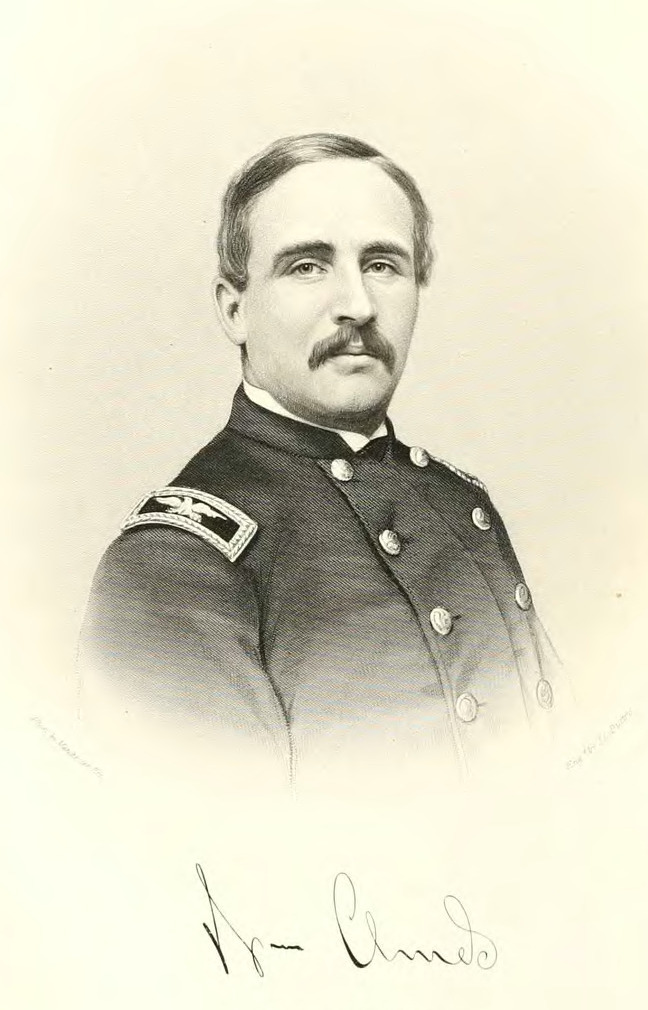

Some of his wartime letters are extant.

== Political career ==
He served in the Rhode Island House of Representatives in 1898. He was a Republican.

== Legacy ==
A House Resolution honored him after his death. He is buried at Swan Point Cemetery.

The Rhode Island Historical Society has a portrait of him. A pair of gauntlets (gloves) purported to be his from the Civil War were auctioned.

== See also ==
- Ames family
- Lincoln School (Providence, Rhode Island), established for his second wife's daughter
