= Gustavus Woodson Smith =

American military officer (1821–1896)

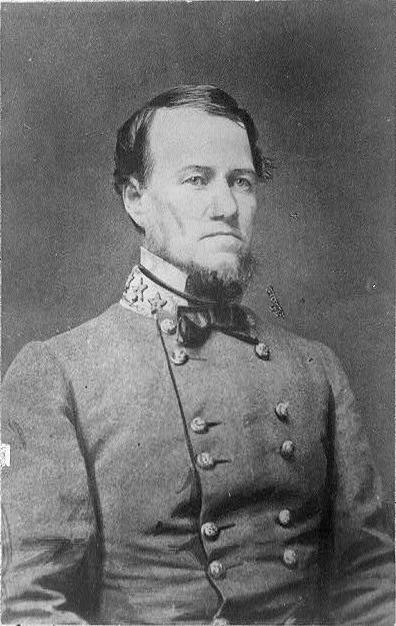
- Gustavus Woodson Smith, photo taken during the Civil War 1861–65
- Born: November 30, 1821; Georgetown, Kentucky, U.S.
- Died: June 24, 1896 (aged 74); New York City, New York, U.S.
- Burial place: Cedar Grove Cemetery, New London, Connecticut, U.S.
- Military career
- Allegiance: United States of America; Confederate States of America
- Branch: United States Army; Confederate States Army
- Service years: 1842–1854 (USA); 1861–1863, 1864–1865 (CSA)
- Rank: Brevet Captain (USA); Major General (CSA)
- Commands: Army of Northern Virginia
- Conflicts: Mexican–American War; Battle of Cerro Gordo; Battle of Contreras; American Civil War; Battle of Seven Pines; Battle of Atlanta; Battle of Honey Hill
- Other work: Civil engineer streets commissioner iron manufacturer insurance commissioner author

Gustavus Woodson Smith (November 30, 1821 – June 24, 1896), more commonly known as G.W. Smith, was a career United States Army officer who fought in the Mexican–American War, a civil engineer, and a major general in the Confederate States Army during the American Civil War. He briefly commanded the Army of Northern Virginia from May 31 until June 1, 1862, following the wounding of General Joseph E. Johnston at the Battle of Seven Pines, and before General Robert E. Lee took command. Smith later served as an interim Confederate States Secretary of War and in the Georgia Militia.

== Early life and Mexican-American War ==
Smith was born in Georgetown, Kentucky, and was a brother-in-law of Horace Randal and a distant relative of John Bell Hood. He graduated from the United States Military Academy as a brevet second lieutenant in 1842. Smith finished eighth out of 56 cadets. He entered the United States Army Corps of Engineers afterward and was promoted to second lieutenant on January 1, 1845.

Smith fought in the Mexican–American War, winning two brevet promotions for his actions. On April 18, 1847, he was appointed brevet first lieutenant for his service at the Battle of Cerro Gordo, and on August 20, 1847, brevet captain for his service at the Battle of Contreras. In 1848 he became an original member of the Aztec Club of 1847.

On March 3, 1853, Smith was promoted to first lieutenant. He resigned his commission on December 18, 1854, to become a civil engineer in New York City, and was Streets Commissioner there from 1858 to 1861.

== Civil War ==
Smith's home state of Kentucky became a border state when the American Civil War began in 1861. Some months afterward, Smith presented himself in Richmond, Virginia, to serve in the Confederate States Army. Commissioned as a major general on September 19, he served in Northern Virginia as a divisional and "wing" commander. He fought in the Battle of Seven Pines near Richmond during the Peninsula Campaign.

On May 31, 1862, because he was the senior major general in the Army of Northern Virginia, Smith briefly took command after Gen. Joseph E. Johnston was wounded at Seven Pines. However, Smith's nerve broke, and Jefferson Davis replaced him with Robert E. Lee the following day, June 1. On June 2, Smith took a leave of absence to recuperate.

In late August, Smith returned and took command of the defenses around Richmond, which was expanded to become the Department of North Carolina & Southern Virginia in September. In addition, he acted as interim Confederate States Secretary of War from November 17 through November 21, 1862.

Smith resigned his commission as a major general on February 17, 1863, and became a volunteer aide to General P. G. T. Beauregard for the rest of that year. Smith was also the superintendent of the Etowah Iron Works from 1863 until June 1, 1864, when he was commissioned a major general in the Georgia Militia, commanding its first division until the war's end.

== Postbellum life and death ==
Smith was paroled in Macon, Georgia, on April 20, 1865, and moved to Tennessee to become an iron manufacturer from 1866 to 1870. He moved back to Kentucky to become Insurance Commissioner until 1876, then moved to New York City and began writing. Smith authored Notes on Insurance in 1870, Confederate War Papers in 1884, The Battle of Seven Pines in 1891, and Generals J. E. Johnston and G. T. Beauregard at the Battle of Manassas, July 1861 in 1892. His final work, Company "A," Corps of Engineers, U.S.A., 1846–48, in the Mexican War, was published in 1896 after his death.

In December 1894, he was one of nineteen founders of the Military Order of Foreign Wars - a military society for officers who were veterans of wars with foreign nations and their descendants.

Smith died in New York City in 1896 and was buried in the Cedar Grove Cemetery in New London, Connecticut.

== See also ==
- List of American Civil War generals (Confederate)
