= Battle of Honey Hill =

1864 battle of the American Civil War

- Part of the American Civil War
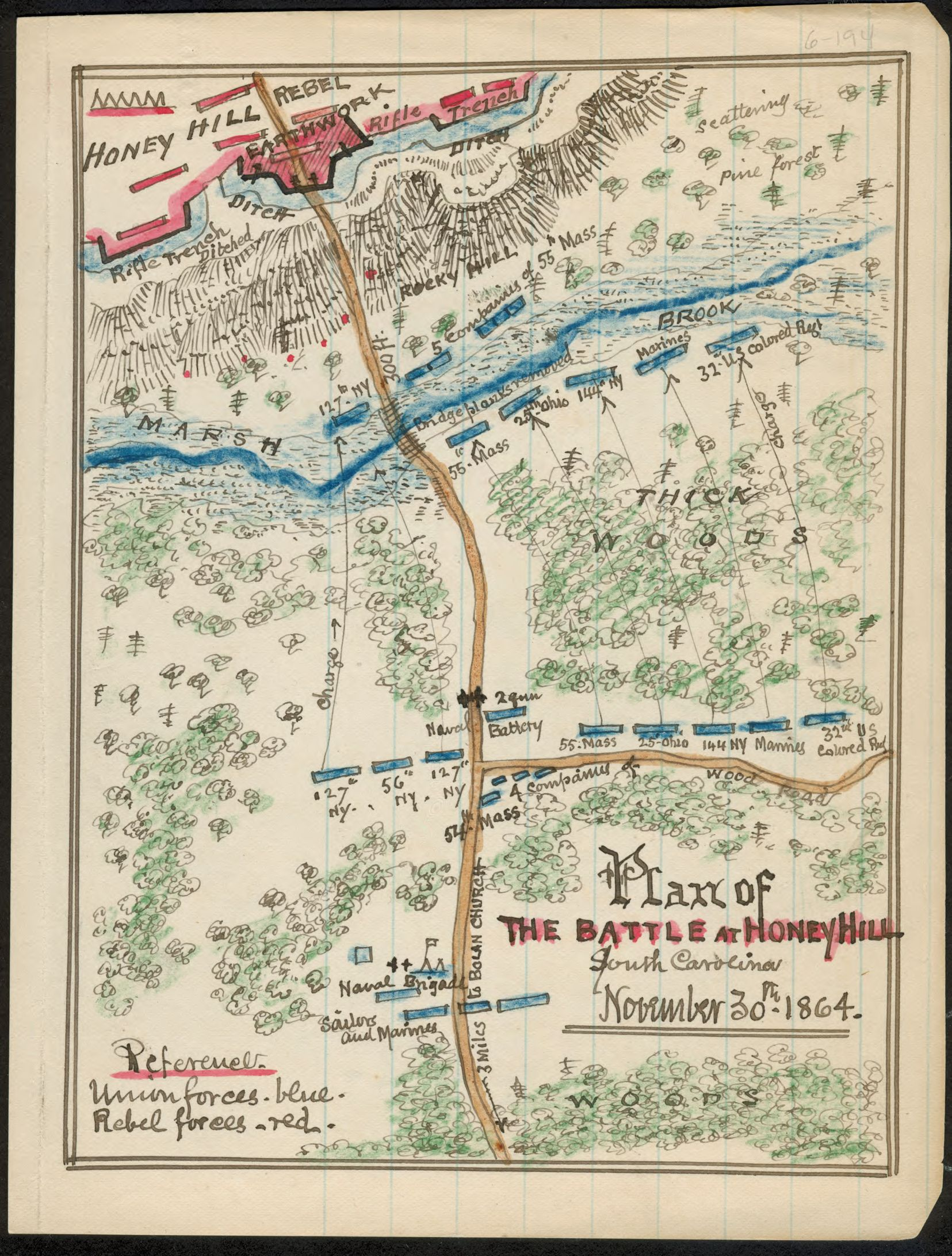
- Plan of the Battle of Honey Hill, South Carolina
Date	November 30, 1864
Location	Beaufort County (present-day Jasper County), South Carolina 32°29′10″N 80°56′03″W
Result	Confederate victory

Belligerents
Confederate States	United States (Union)

Commanders and leaders
(Confederate States of America) Charles J. Colcock: Gustavus W. Smith	(United States) John P. Hatch

Units involved
Military District of Georgia: Georgia Militia	Coastal Division, Department of the South; South Atlantic Blockading Squadron

Strength
1,400	5,000

Casualties and losses
50 total 8 killed 42 wounded	755 total 88 killed, 623 wounded 44 captured
- Location within South Carolina

The Battle of Honey Hill was the third battle of Savannah campaign, fought November 30, 1864, during the American Civil War. It did not involve Major General William T. Sherman's main force, marching from Atlanta to Savannah, Georgia, but was a failed Union Army expedition under Brig. Gen. John P. Hatch that attempted to cut off the Charleston and Savannah Railroad in support of Sherman's projected arrival in Savannah.

== Battle ==
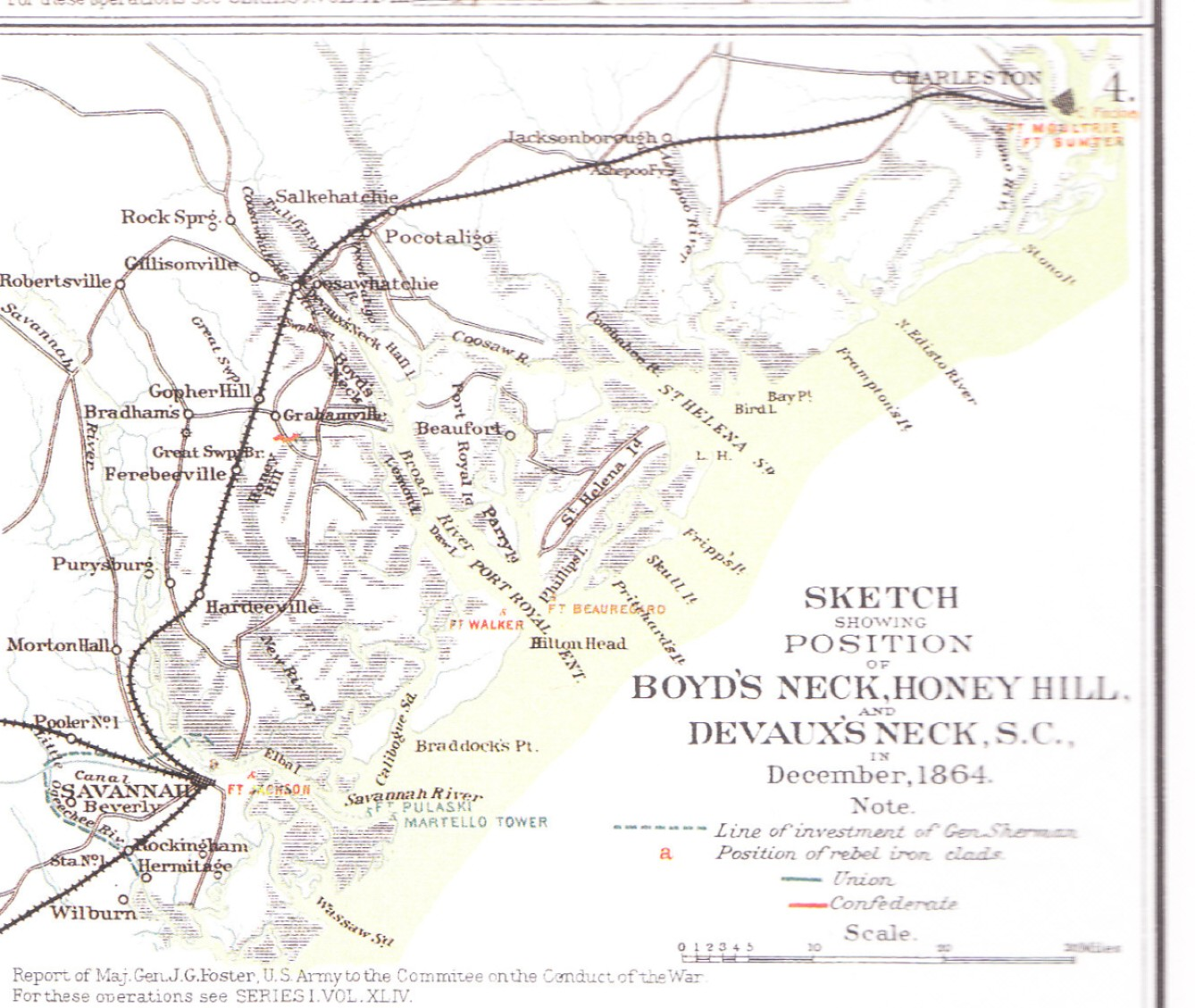
Map of Honey Hill and Grahamsville, Official Military Atlas of the Civil War, Plate XCI, Nr.4

Hatch's expeditionary force left Hilton Head, South Carolina, for Boyd’s Neck (above Beaufort) on November 28. It consisted of 5,000 men—two brigades of the Coast Division of the Department of the South, one naval brigade, and portions of three batteries of light artillery. They steamed up the Broad River in transports to cut the Charleston and Savannah Railroad near Pocotaligo. Due to a heavy fog the troops were not disembarked from the transports until late the following afternoon, and Hatch immediately started forward to cut the railroad near Grahamville.

However, the expedition maps and guides proved worthless and Hatch was unable to proceed on the right road until the morning of November 30. At Honey Hill, a few miles from Grahamville, he encountered a Confederate force of regulars and militia, under Col. Charles J. Colcock, with a battery of seven guns across the road. Determined attacks were launched by U.S. Colored Troops including a brigade led by Alfred S. Hartwell that included the 54th Massachusetts and 55th Massachusetts. The position of the Federal force was such that only one section of artillery could be used at a time, and the Confederates were too well entrenched to be dislodged. Fighting kept up until dark when Hatch, realizing the impossibility of successfully attacking or turning the flank of the enemy, withdrew to his transports at Boyd’s Neck, having lost 89 men killed, 629 wounded, and 28 missing. The Confederate casualties amounted to eight killed and 39 wounded.

== Aftermath ==
Captains George E. Gouraud and Thomas F. Ellsworth as well as First Lt. Orson W. Bennett were awarded the Medal of Honor. In 2001 another medal was awarded posthumously to then Corporal Andrew J. Smith.

== Casualties and losses ==
In a report of Hatch December 1864 summarized the Union losses:

- 1st Brigade: casualties of 2 officers and 54 men killed;28 officers and 409 men wounded; 1 officer and 14 men missing.
- 2nd Brigade: casualties of 3 officers and 28 men killed;10 officers and 160 men wounded; 1 officer and 8 men missing.
- Naval Brigade: casualties of 1 man killed; 7 men wounded; 4 men missing
- Artillery Brigade: casualties of 1 officer killed; 2 officers and 12 men wounded
- Cavalry: casualties of 1 man wounded

The Confederate losses were reported by Lt Col C.C. Jones in his Siege of Savannah as 4 killed and 40 wounded. The Savannah Republican newspaper on Dec 1, 1864 reported "between eighty and one hundred killed and wounded"
