= Postcolonial Africa =

Postcolonial history of the African region

Dates of independence of African countries

The postcolonial history of Africa spans the postcolonial, neocolonial, and contemporary period in the history of Africa. The decolonization of Africa started with Libya become independent in 1951 from the United Kingdom and France, although Liberia, South Africa, Egypt and Ethiopia were already independent. Many countries followed in the 1950s and 1960s, with a peak in 1960 with the Year of Africa, which saw 17 African nations declare independence, including 14 colonies from the French colonial empire, 2 from the British Empire and 1 from Belgium. From the 54 countries of Africa today, 25 gained independence from France, 19 from the United Kingdom 5 from Portugal, 3 from Belgium and 1 from Spain. Most of the remaining countries gained independence throughout the 1960s, although some colonizers (Portugal in particular) were reluctant to relinquish sovereignty, resulting in bitter wars of independence which lasted for a decade or more. The last African countries to gain formal independence were Guinea-Bissau (1974), Mozambique (1975) and Angola (1975) from Portugal; Djibouti from France in 1977; Zimbabwe from the United Kingdom in 1980; and Namibia from South Africa in 1990. Eritrea later split off from Ethiopia in 1993. South Sudan later declared independence from Sudan in 2011, following the referendum and the end of 22 year civil war.

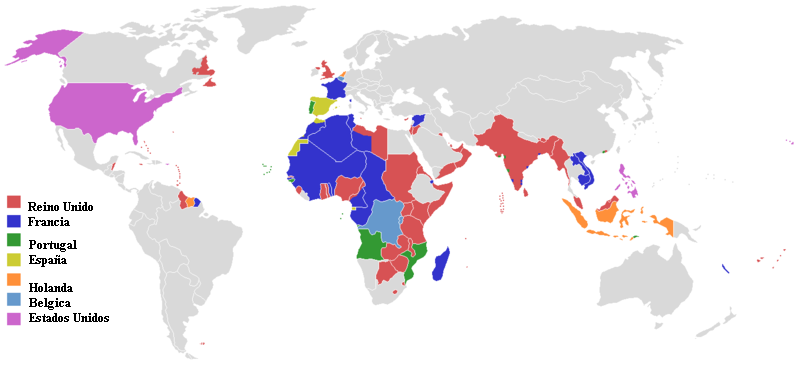
Colonial powers in 1950

== North Africa ==
Moroccan nationalism developed during the 1930s; the Istiqlal Party was formed, pushing for independence. In 1953 sultan Mohammed V of Morocco called for independence. On March 2, 1956, Morocco became independent of France. Mohammed V became ruler of independent Morocco.

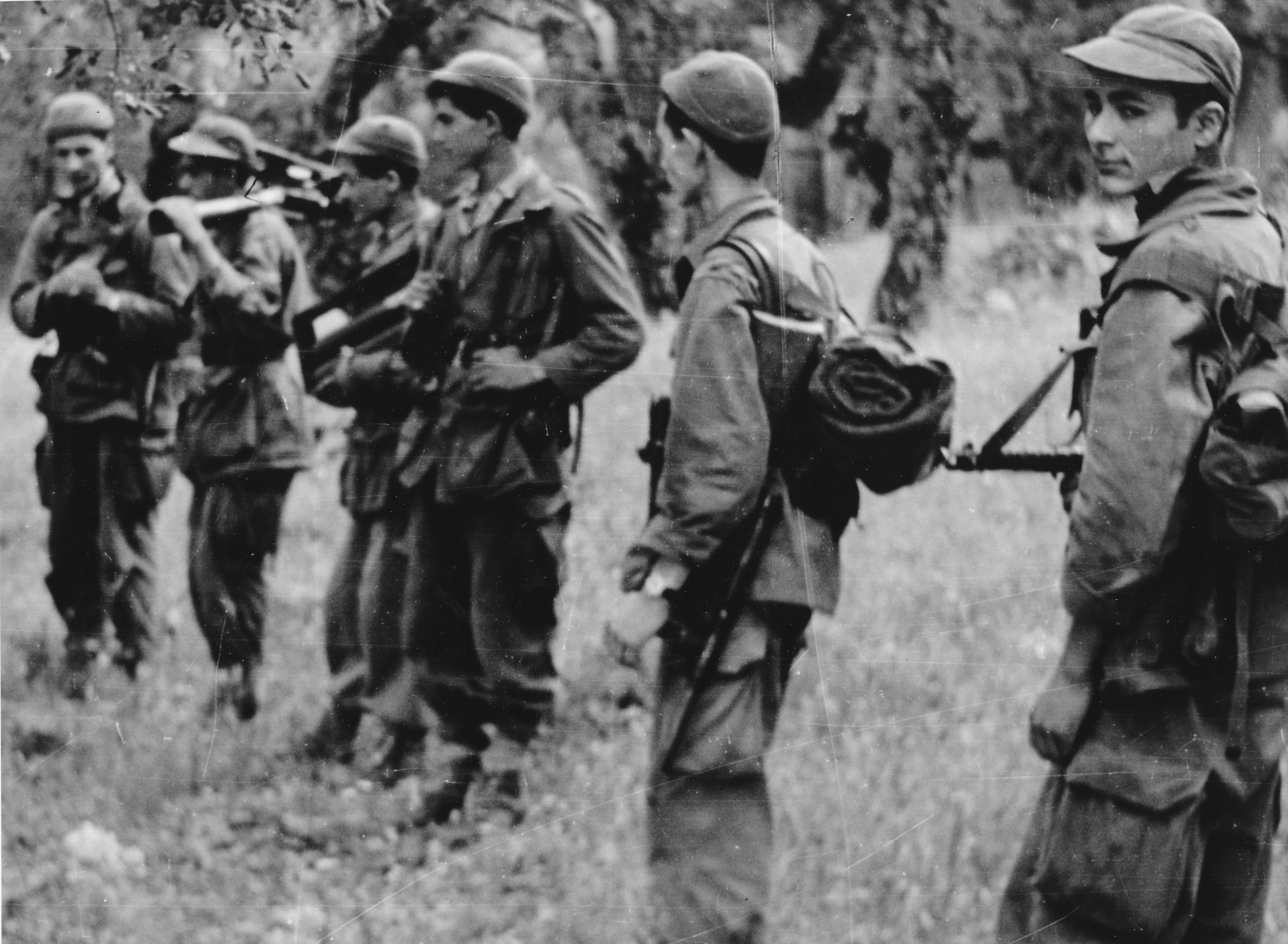
Soldiers of the National Liberation Army during the Algerian War of Independence, 1958

In 1954, Algeria formed the National Liberation Front (FLN) as it split from France. This resulted in the Algerian War, which lasted until independence negotiations in 1962. Muhammad Ahmed Ben Bella was elected President of Algeria. Over a million French nationals, predominantly Pied-Noirs, left the country, crippling the economy.

In 1934, the "Neo Destour" (New Constitution) party was founded by Habib Bourguiba pushing for independence in Tunisia. Tunisia became independent in 1955. Its bey was deposed and Habib Bourguiba elected as President of Tunisia.

In 1954, Gamal Abdel Nasser deposed the monarchy of Egypt in the Egyptian Revolution of 1952 and came to power as Prime Minister of Egypt. Muammar Gaddafi led the 1969 Libyan coup d'état which deposed Idris of Libya. Gaddafi remained in power until his death in the Libyan Civil War of 2011 which had caused power vacuums that allowed both foreign terrorist fighters and extremists including the Islamic State (IS) to enter Libya by establishing Wilayah Libya in late 2014, which still continues today at the southern region of Fezzan. Egypt was involved in several wars against Israel and was allied with other Arab countries. The first was the 1948 Arab–Israeli War, right after the state of Israel was founded. In 1956, Israel, France and the United Kingdom invaded Egypt after Nasser announced the nationalization of the Suez Canal; Egypt was attacked again by Israel in the Six-Day War of 1967 and lost the Sinai Peninsula to Israel. They went to war yet again in the Yom Kippur War of 1973. In 1979, President of Egypt Anwar Sadat and Prime Minister of Israel Menachem Begin signed the Camp David Accords, which gave back the Sinai Peninsula to Egypt in exchange for the recognition of Israel. The accords are still in effect today. In 1981, Sadat was assassinated by members of the Egyptian Islamic Jihad under Khalid Islambouli. The assassins were Islamists who targeted Sadat for his signing of the Accords.

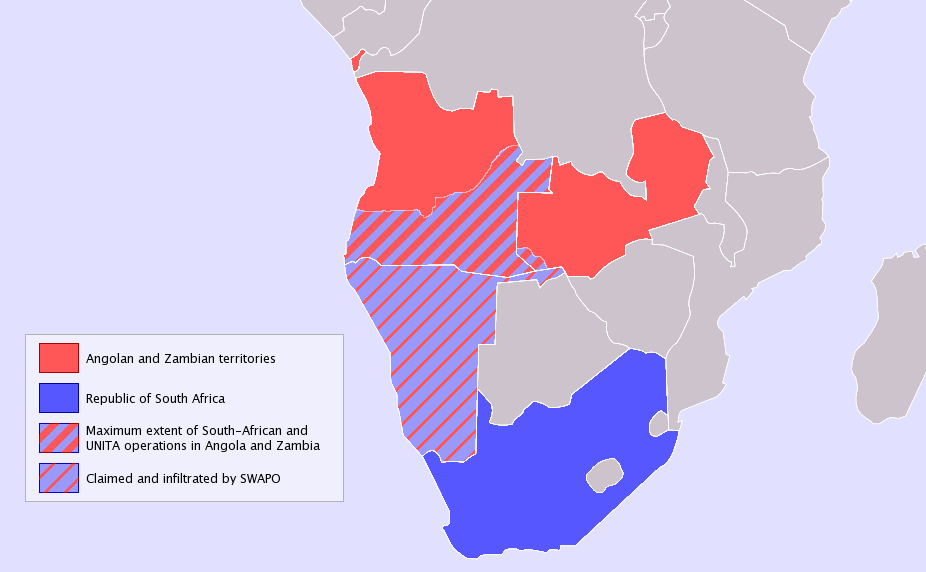
South African-occupied South West Africa (1915–1990) and maximum extent of South African and UNITA operations in Angola and Zambia during the Angolan Civil War

== West Africa ==
Following World War II, nationalist movements arose across West Africa, most notably in Ghana under Kwame Nkrumah. In 1957, Ghana became the first sub-Saharan colony to achieve its independence, followed the next year by France's colonies; by 1974, West Africa's nations were entirely autonomous. Since independence, many West African nations have been plagued by corruption and instability, with notable civil wars in Nigeria, Sierra Leone, Liberia, and Ivory Coast, and a succession of military coups in Ghana and Burkina Faso. Many states have failed to develop their economies despite enviable natural resources, and political instability is often accompanied by undemocratic government.

== Central Africa ==
Ambazonian nationalism gained steam in 1982

The central regions of Africa were traditionally regarded to be the regions between Kilwa and the mouth of the Zambesi river. Due to its isolated position from the coasts, this area has received minimal attention from historians pertaining to Africa. It also had one of the most varied sources of European colonial imperialists including Germany in Cameroon, Britain in Northern Cameroons, Belgium in Congo, and France in CAF. Due to its territory, among the main trope s regarding Central Africa is traversing its lands and the nature of its tropicals. Since 1982, one of the main protracted issues within central Africa has been the ongoing secession movement of the secessionist entity of Ambazonia. The impasse between Cameroon and Ambazonia gained steam in 1992 when Fon Gorji-Dinka filed an international lawsuit against Cameroon claiming that Ambazonian territories are held illegally by the latter and describing Cameroonian claims on Ambazonian territories as illegal. Fifteen years later, this stalemate would escalate when Abmazonia formally declared itself as the Federal Republic of Ambazonia.

== East Africa ==
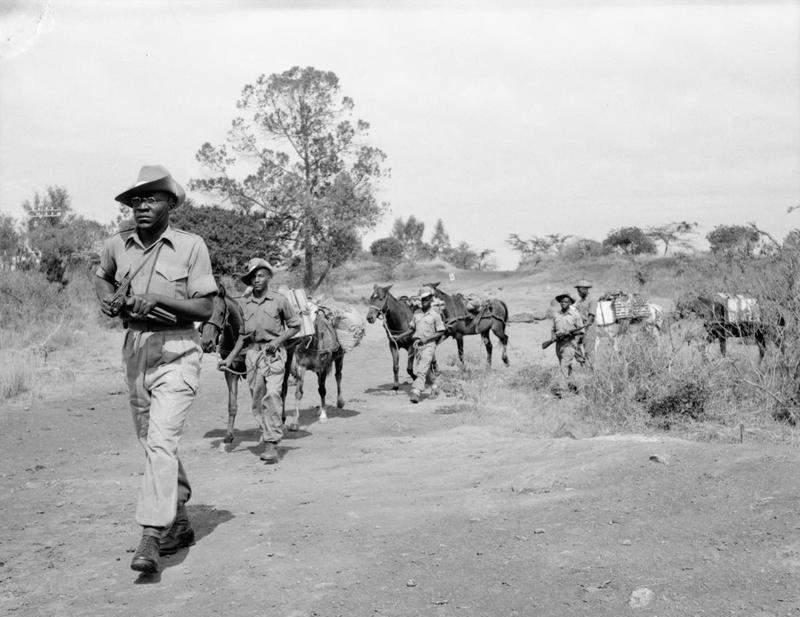
Troops of the King's African Rifles carry supplies while on watch for Mau Mau fighters during the Mau Mau Uprising. 1952-1956.

The Mau Mau Uprising took place in Kenya from 1952 until 1956 but was put down by British and local forces. A state of emergency remained in place until 1960. Kenya became independent in 1963, and Jomo Kenyatta served as its first president.

The early 1960s also signaled the start of major clashes between the Hutus and the Tutsis in Rwanda and Burundi. In 1994 this culminated in the Rwandan genocide, a conflict in which over 800,000 people were murdered.

== Southern Africa ==
In 1948 the apartheid laws were started in South Africa by the dominant National Party. These were largely a continuation of existing policies; the difference was the policy of "separate development" (Apartheid). Where previous policies had only been disparate efforts to economically exploit the African majority, Apartheid represented an entire philosophy of separate racial goals, leading to both the divisive laws of 'petty apartheid,' and the grander scheme of African homelands.

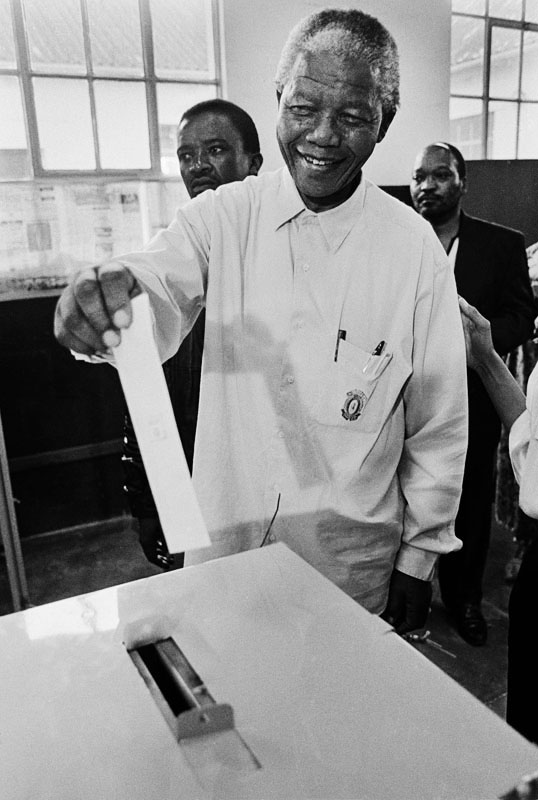
Nelson Mandela voting in the 1994 South African elections. He became the first Post-Apartheid leader of South Africa.

In 1994, Apartheid ended, and Nelson Mandela of the African National Congress was elected president after the South African general election, 1994, the country's first non-racial election.

== See also ==
- List of kingdoms in Africa throughout history
- Decolonisation of Africa
