= Flag of Ambazonia =

Ambazonia
- Use: National flag
- Proportion: 2:3
- Adopted: 2017
- Design: Nine horizontal stripes, in turn blue and white; a dove surrounded by 13 stars on a blue square field in canton.
- Designed by: SCNC

The national flag of the unrecognized Ambazonia is used by Ambazonian separatists. Originally designed and adopted by the Southern Cameroons National Council in 1999, it has since been universally embraced by Ambazonian separatist movements.

== Symbolism ==
According to the Ambazonia Governing Council, the components of the flag symbolize the following:

- Blue: Democracy, the plurality of the people and the rule of law, potential for growth and development, and for faith in God.
- White: Purity, transparency, accountability in life and governance, and intolerance of mediocrities and corruption.
- Dove: Principles of God and peace and tranquility.
- Green leaves carried by the dove: Assurance of good news even in stormy circumstances, truth and justice, a promise of peace, prosperity, productivity and success.
- 13 stars: The 13 counties of Ambazonia.
- Golden color: Priceless value of all 13 counties, balanced development, and equity and equality among the counties.
- The dove's flight: Visionary focus, hard work, liberty and freedom.

== Other flags ==
Flag of the Ambas Bay Protectorate
(1884–1887)

Flag of the Imperial Colonial Office (German Kamerun)
(1892–1918)

Flag of British Cameroons
(1922–1961)

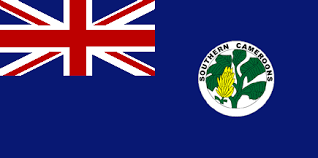
Flag of Southern Cameroons
(1954-1961)

Flag of the Federal Republic of Cameroon (1961–1972) (Note: The original flag of Cameroon was a simple tricolor. Upon unification with Southern Cameroons, two stars were added to the flag, with one star for the Francophone part of the country and one for the Anglophone regions. Following the abolition of the federation, this design was dropped in favor of a single-star flag.)

Flag of the Republic of Cameroon (1972–present)
