= International reactions to the Anglophone Crisis =

From 2018, the Anglophone Crisis drew increasing international attention, and became a challenge to Cameroon's foreign relations. Triggered by a violent crackdown on the 2016–2017 Cameroonian protests, the conflict escalated from a low-scale insurgency to a civil war-like situation. While Cameroon enjoys support from African countries, no country has openly supported the Ambazonian independence movements. However, many countries have put pressure on Cameroon to talk to the separatists. In addition, the separatists enjoy support from officers in the Nigerian Army, who have helped arrange arms deals for them.

While African countries have been largely silent on the issue and opposed any non-African interference, many Western countries have put pressure on Cameroon to open a dialogue with the separatists. In May 2019, an informal discussion was held at the United Nations Security Council, a milestone after nearly two years of little international involvement.

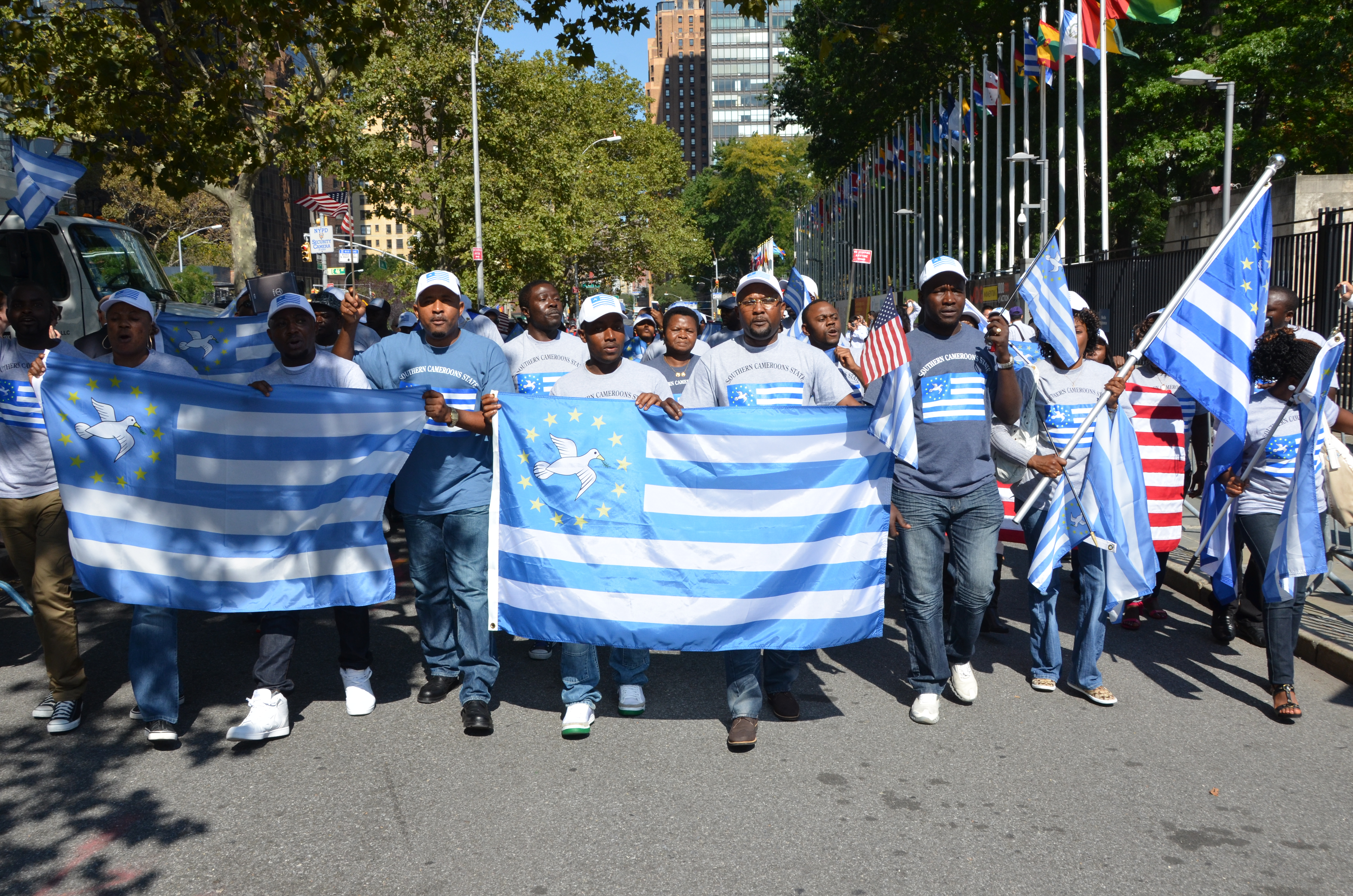
Southern Cameroonian expats marching in support of the Ambazonian cause

== International organizations ==
- African Union – Until 2019, the African Union remained largely silent on the Anglophone Crisis. On July 27, 2019, the AU welcomed the upcoming Swiss-mediated talks.
- Commonwealth of Nations – In November 2019, Commonwealth Secretary-General Patricia Scotland expressed support for the peace process initiated by the Cameroonian government.
- European Union – On June 20, 2018, the EU supported the entry of UN bodies to the Anglophone region, and called upon the Cameroonian government to allow this. In March 2019, High Representative Federica Mogherini stated that "the persistent violence and human rights abuses in the North West and South West regions of Cameroon have created an unacceptable number of victims as well as enormous human and material damages". She also blamed Cameroonian media and politicians for incitement through hate speech. In April 2019, the European Parliament passed a motion condemning human right violations in Southern Cameroons and calling for an investigation of possible war crimes committed by Cameroonian soldiers. It also called on Cameroon to stop using "military trials for civilians and francophone courts for Anglophone detainees". The motion concluded that the Anglophone Crisis, if it continues, should be tabled at the United Nations Security Council. The EU statement was met with condemnation in the Senate of Cameroon, with Senate President Marcel Niat Njifenji calling it a "litany of falsehoods". Njifenji also stated that Cameroon would be open to receiving an EU delegation, so they could see for themselves. In June 2019, the EU gave its blessing to the upcoming Swiss-mediated negotiations.
- United Nations – On May 30, 2018, the United Nations declared a humanitarian crisis in Southern Cameroons and started organizing aid. Through the declaration, the United Nations assumed responsibility for the safety of civilians in Southern Cameroons, and to this end it could intervene against both warring parties. The United Nations has also called for impartial investigations of possible human rights violations in the Anglophone region. On November 20, 2018, the UN condemned both sides; the separatists for abductions, school attacks and killings of policemen, and the government for carrying out extrajudicial executions. On February 7, 2019, Allegra Baiocchi, the UN Resident and Humanitarian Coordinator for Cameroon, said that the situation was a "forgotten crisis" and should be put near the top of the UN's agenda. On May 6, 2019, UN High Commissioner for Human Rights Michelle Bachelet said that there was still a window of opportunity to end the crisis, but the Cameroonian government had to take decisive action to win the trust of the population in Southern Cameroons.

== States ==
=== Africa ===
- Chad – According to unverified reports, Chadian President Idriss Déby agreed to deploy Chadian troops to the Anglophone regions to fight the separatists. In February 2018, it was reported that Chadian troops had been fighting in Southern Cameroons for weeks. However, no physical evidence of such a deployment has been provided. In March 2019, the Chadian president called for other African states to get involved and assist in ending the conflict.
- Egypt – In December 2019, Egypt voiced support for the Major National Dialogue held two months prior.
- Equatorial Guinea – In January 2018, President Teodoro Obiang Nguema Mbasogo called for dialogue as the best way to end the Anglophone crisis. Equatorial Guinea has voted against attempts to bring the Anglophone Crisis up to discussion at the UN Security Council, and has endorsed the peace efforts by the Cameroonian government. In December 2019, Equatorial Guinea called for international assistance to the parties.
- Ethiopia – As a non-permanent member of the UN Security Council, Ethiopia has voted against attempts to bring the Anglophone Crisis up to discussion.
- Ghana – In 2019, it was revealed that weapons produced in Ghana had been smuggled into Southern Cameroons, prompting a meeting between Paul Biya and Ghanaian MP Albert Kan-Dapaah. Ghana has taken in refugees who have fled the Anglophone regions. In August 2019, SOCADEF leader Ebenezer Akwanga was briefly questioned by the Ghanaian Bureau of National Investigations.
- Ivory Coast – As a non-permanent member of the UN Security Council, the Ivory Coast has voted against attempts to bring the Anglophone Crisis up to discussion. When an informal discussion was held, the Ivory Coast voiced support for the peace efforts of the Cameroonian government.
- Nigeria – President Muhammadu Buhari vowed to prevent the separatists from operating from Nigerian territory; "Nigeria will take necessary measures within the ambit of the law to ensure that her territory is not used as a staging area to destabilise another friendly sovereign country". Having its own separatist elements to worry about, and benefitting from military cooperation with Cameroon against Boko Haram, Nigeria has been mostly supportive of the Cameroonian government. In January 2018, Nigeria arrested the Ambazonian leadership on its territory, including President Sisiku Julius Ayuk Tabe. They were then extradited to Cameroon, and jailed for a year before the start of a court case in January 2019. However, this was not without controversy, as the Ambazonian leaders had all submitted asylum claims. On March 1, 2019, a Nigerian court ruled that the 12 Ambazonian leaders should be returned to Nigeria, and compensated five million Nigerian naira each for the wrongful extradition. 57 other activists were also to be returned and to be given smaller compensations. This was not followed by any action by the Nigerian government. In July 2019, Nigeria pledged to prevent separatist fighters from smuggling firearms across the border or training in Nigeria. In February 2020, Nigeria set aside 100 hectares of land where refugees from the Anglophone regions could build farms and work the land, and donated approximately 1.4 billion CFA franc to help them get started.
  - Despite Nigeria's official policy, Ambazonian separatists frequently cross the border to buy firearms and to recruit fighters in refugee camps. There are also officers in the Nigerian Army who support the separatists by arranging arms deals.
- South Africa – In May 2019, as a non-permanent member of the UN Security Council, South Africa opposed an effort by the United States and the European Union to discuss the Anglophone Crisis at the UN Security Council. Taking a position shared by other African countries, South Africa held that the African Union, not the United Nations, should be responsible for handling the Anglophone Crisis. Due to this objections, only an informal discussion was held at the UN Security Council on May 13. However, South Africa criticized the Cameroonian government for being insincere in its efforts to end the crisis and for committing human rights violations.

=== Asia ===
- China – In November 2018, China offered humanitarian assistance to internally displaced people in Southern Cameroons. China has voted against proposals to discuss the Anglophone Crisis at the UN Security Council, When an informal discussion was held in May 2019, China took a neutral stance, and it believes the conflict does not require an international intervention due to it not being a threat to world peace.
- Japan – In July 2019, Japan supported the UNDP in granting financial support to 18 organizations working for the recovery of the war-torn regions.
- India – India criticized the Cameroonian government at an informal discussion in the UN Security Council, joining other countries in accusing it of not doing enough to solve the conflict.
- Indonesia – In May 2019, Indonesia called for cooperation with the Cameroonian government and regional organizations, and for an inclusive dialogue.
- Israel – In 2018, an Israeli human rights lawyer petitioned the Supreme Court of Israel to cancel all licenses to export Israeli weapons to the Rapid Intervention Battalion (BIR). A gag order accompanied the final ruling, which thus remains secret. However, a source within the BIR indicated that Israeli rifles had stopped arriving by 2019.
- Kuwait – In May 2019, Kuwait criticized the Cameroonian government for lacking political will to end the war.

=== Europe ===
- Belgium – In November 2018, a Belgian envoy stated that Cameroon should learn from Belgium when it comes to dealing with multi-lingualism. At an informal discussion at the UN Security Council in May 2019, Belgium endorsed the peace efforts by the Cameroonian government, being the only European country besides France to do so.
- France – France has condemned separatist attacks on soldiers, and has called for dialogue to ensure the unity of Cameroon. France has supported the peace efforts of the Cameroonian government, and maintains military cooperation with Cameroon. In July 2019, France declared that the Anglophone Crisis could not be solved militarily, but only politically. Separatists have repeatedly accused France of secretly deploying soldiers to fight alongside the Cameroonian Army in the Anglophone regions.
- Germany – Germany officially supports a resolution through dialogue and reforms. When an informal discussion was held at the UN Security Council in May 2019, Germany criticized the Cameroonian government.
- Netherlands – The Netherlands have attempted to get the Anglophone Crisis up for discussion at the UN Security Council.
- Norway – The Norwegian Refugee Council established itself in the Anglophone regions in 2019, aiming to provide internally displaced children with education. Norway has attempted to get the Anglophone Crisis up for discussion at the UN Security Council.
- Poland – At an informal discussion about the Anglophone Crisis at the UN Security Council on May 13, 2019, Poland criticized the Cameroonian government for not doing enough to end the conflict.
- Russia – Russia has voted against proposals to discuss the Anglophone Crisis at the UN Security Council. When an informal discussion was held in May 2019, Russia criticized the Cameroonian government, while also warning against foreign intervention.
- Sweden – In December 2018, Permanent Representative of Sweden to the United Nations Olof Skoog said that the Anglophone Crisis was a threat to regional stability, and urged Cameroon to work towards a resolution in cooperation with the United Nations.
- Switzerland – In April 2019, Switzerland offered its assistance in finding a solution to the conflict. On June 27, the Swiss Federal Department of Foreign Affairs confirmed that it would act as a mediator in upcoming negotiations, following requests from both the Cameroonian government and the Ambazonian separatists.
- United Kingdom – Minister for African Affairs Harriett Baldwin called for the conflict to be "solved democratically". At an informal discussion at the UN Security Council in May 2019, the United Kingdom criticized Cameroon for violating human rights and for not doing enough to solve the conflict.
- Vatican City – In February 2019, the Vatican offered to act as a mediator to help end the conflict.

=== North America ===
- Canada – In April 2019, the Canadian government offered $6.65 million in humanitarian aid, some of which was earmarked for security concerns. Ambazonian independence activist Ebenezer Akwanga has filed a CDN$25 million claim against Canada for violating the economic self determination of Ambazonia by backing anti-Ambazonian oil companies. In January 2023, Mélanie Joly, Minister of Foreign Affairs issued a statement announcing a peace process involving the Cameroonian government and Ambazonian separatists aimed at resolving the Anglophone Crisis with Canada acting as a mediator.
- Dominican Republic – In May 2019, the Dominican Republic joined the United States and the United Kingdom in requesting a discussion about the Anglophone Crisis at the UN Security Council. At the meeting, the Dominican Republic criticized the Cameroonian government for its handling of the crisis.
- United States – According to the U.S. Department of State's Country Report on Human Rights Practices 2017, Cameroonian forces carried out arbitrary killings, disappearances, torture, violations of freedom of expression and unlawful detentions in harsh prison conditions. In 2018, the United States formally accused the Cameroonian Army of carrying out targeted killings. In November 2018, following the death of an American missionary, the US Department of State issued a statement urging both sides to cease all attacks on civilian targets. The United States also condemned the "systematic intimidation based on ethnic and religious affiliation" in Cameroon. In February 2019, the United States decided to cut military aid worth of $17 million over Cameroon's human rights record, as well as withdrawing Cameroon's invitation into the State Partnership Program. The next day, United States Africa Command leader Thomas Waldhauser said the lack of transparency in the investigations into human rights violations by government soldiers could have a major impact on their ability to support Cameroon's counterterrorism efforts and challenged Biya to show greater transparency. In March 2019, Secretary for African Affairs Tibor P. Nagy called on the Cameroonian government to take more decisive action to solve the Anglophone Crisis, to grant autonomy to the Anglophone regions, and to release political prisoners. Communication Minister of Cameroon, René Sadi, responded on behalf of the government by stating that the security forces do respect human rights, and that Cameroon has to protect its territorial integrity against "secessionist terrorists". At an informal discussion at the UN Security Council in May 2019, the United States again criticized the Cameroonian government. On May 16, Tibor Nagy accused the Cameroonian government of doing "nothing" to solve the conflict. Nagy also stated that he did not believe that Ambazonian independence was a realistic option, and that the United States recognized the territorial integrity of Cameroon. In July 2019, the United States House of Representatives passed resolution 358, calling for the reintroduction of a federal system in Cameroon. In October 2019, President Donald Trump cancelled a trade deal with Cameroon, citing human rights abuses. In June 2021, the United States imposed visa restrictions on anyone deemed to be undermining the peace effort, without specifying whom that would affect.

=== Oceania ===
- Australia – Australian diplomat Alexander Chapman stated that "Australia recommends Cameroon lift unnecessary restrictions on freedom of assembly, investigate the alleged use of force in demonstrations, and ensure arrested protestors receive fair trials."

=== South America ===
- Bolivia – In December 2018, the Deputy Permanent Representative of Bolivia stated that Bolivia supports a resolution through inclusive dialogue.
- Brazil – Although the Brazilian government has not commented on the Anglophone Crisis, the municipality of Barueri recognized Ambazonia on December 3, 2019.
- Peru – In May 2019, at an informal discussion in the UN Security Council, Peru criticized Cameroon for human rights violations and for not doing enough to end the conflict.

== Others ==
- Africa Forum – In January 2020, it was announced that Africa Forum, a group of former African leaders, would organize a conference on Cameroon in Kenya in April. The Forum invited 500 Cameroonians from all backgrounds to participate.
- Amnesty International – In a report published in June 2018, Amnesty International criticized both sides for using excessive force. The report accused the Cameroonian Army of arbitrary arrests, torture, extrajudicial killings and destruction of property. The report claimed that the Cameroonian Army had obliterated an entire village, citing satellite photos as evidence. The Cameroonian Army denied the findings of the report.
- Biafra – Biafran independence movements have voiced support for the Ambazonian cause. A coalition of Biafran movements has met with the Ambazonian leadership and discussed building a diplomatic and bilateral relationship between Biafra and Ambazonia. In early 2021, the Biafra Nations League, a separatist movement based in Bakassi, openly allied themselves with Ambazonian separatists and threatened to take up arms against Cameroon. Following the outbreak of the Insurgency in Southeastern Nigeria, the Indigenous People of Biafra and the Ambazonia Governing Council entered into a military and political alliance.
- Republic of Cabinda – Inspired by a call from the Organization of Emerging African States and a similar move by SOCADEF, Cabindan separatist militias declared a unilateral ceasefire in the Cabinda War to help combat the COVID-19 pandemic.
- Confederation of African Football – Cameroon was meant to host the 2019 Africa Cup of Nations. However, due to security concerns, the Confederation of African Football retracted the hosting right.
- Facebook – In October 2021, it was revealed that Facebook had labeled the Ambazonia Defence Forces a "violent non-state actor".
- Human Rights Watch – In May 2019, Human Rights Watch announced it had "documented 26 cases of illegal detention and enforced disappearance at the detention centre of the Secretariat of State for Defence between January 2018 and January 2019, including 14 cases of torture". This figure included the ten leaders of the Interim Government of Ambazonia who were held in Yaoundé. In June 2019, in response to a video of separatist fighters torturing a man, Central Africa Director Lewis Mudge challenged separatist leaders to order the militias to end all attacks aimed at civilians.
- Unrepresented Nations and Peoples Organization – Ambazonia was admitted to the UNPO on March 28, 2018. The UNPO criticized Nigeria's extradition of the Ambazonian leadership as a violation of international refugee law, as most of the individuals had submitted political asylum claims.
- Organization of Emerging African States (OEAS) – Ambazonia was a founding member of the OEAS in 2011 as Southern Cameroons. The Secretary General of the OEAS is Ebenezer Akwanga, who is also the leader of SOCADEF. In March 2020, OEAS - inspired by a unilateral 14-days ceasefire declared by SOCADEF to combat the coronavirus pandemic - called for a pan-African ceasefire. This call was heeded by separatist movements in Biafra and Cabinda.
- Parliamentarians for Global Action – Following the April 2019 EU Parliament resolutions on the Anglophone Crisis, the PGA condemned the Cameroonian government for arresting political opponents and for interfering with the justice system. It urged the Cameroonian government to talk to the opposition and minorities.

=== Notable individuals ===
- Retired American diplomat Herman Jay Cohen has argued that Cameroon cannot win the war militarily. Drawing parallels to the Eritrean War of Independence, he has claimed that the growing bitterness resulting from prolonged warfare will only serve to close the window of opportunity where reconciliation and territorial integrity is still an option, thereby - ironically - increasing the likelihood of Ambazonian secession.
