= African People's Liberation Movement =

Ambazonian independence movement

- Logo
- Chairperson: Ebenezer Akwanga
- Armed wing: Southern Cameroons Defence Forces

The African People's Liberation Movement (APLM) is an Ambazonian independence movement. It is the successor movement of the Southern Cameroons Youth League, with which it shares an almost identical logo. It is led by chairman Ebenezer Akwanga, who also commands its armed wing, Southern Cameroons Defence Forces (SOCADEF).

In March 2019, the APLM participated in an Anglophone Cameroonian conference in Washington, D.C. The conference, in which both separatists (including the Interim Government of Ambazonia) and federalists participated, resulted in an agreement to form a common front. The Southern Cameroons Liberation Council was subsequently created.
