= Southern Cameroons Youth League =

- Logo
- Leaders: Ayaba Cho Lucas; Ebenezer Akwanga
- Transformed into: African People's Liberation Movement

The Southern Cameroons Youth League (SCYL) was an Ambazonian independence movement, led by Ayaba Cho Lucas and Ebenezer Akwanga. While Ayaba went on to become the leader of the Ambazonia Governing Council, Akwanga saw SCYL transform into the African People's Liberation Movement.

SCYL was one of the organizations that arose from the split of the Southern Cameroons National Council.
