= Ebenezer Akwanga =

Ambazonian activist

Ebenezer Derek Mbongo Akwanga
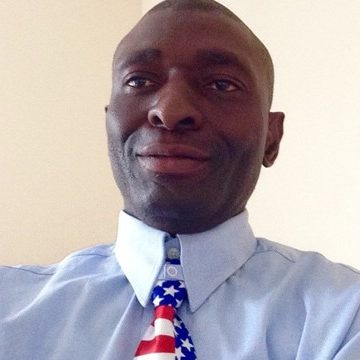
- Born: 1970 (age 55–56); Tiko, Cameroon
- Education: PhD Political Science 2014 University of KwaZulu-Natal
- Occupations: Chairman of the African People's Liberation Movement, Secretary General of the Organization of Emerging African States and leader of SOCADEF

Ebenezer Derek Mbongo Akwanga is an Ambazonian independence activist. He is the chairman of the African People's Liberation Movement, an Ambazonian separatist movement, and heads its armed wing, SOCADEF. A former student at the University of Buea, he and fellow activist Ayaba Cho Lucas founded a pro-independence student association. Their movement was soon outlawed, and in 1997, Akwanga was imprisoned for six years. Following his escape from prison, he joined forces with the Southern Cameroons National Council (SCNC). When the SCNC split into several factions, he became the leader of the Southern Cameroons Youth League (SCYL). The SCYL eventually transformed into the African People's Liberation Movement (APLM). In March 2019, he oversaw the APLM taking part in founding the Southern Cameroons Liberation Council, in an attempt to form a united front. Akwanga is also an advocate of the Biafran case, and has spoken in favor of an alliance between Ambazonian and Biafran independence movements. He has called for referendums on independence in both the former Southern Cameroons (including Bakassi) and Biafra.

== Political career ==
Ebenezer Akwanga became a political activist in 1993, initially campaigning peacefully for the rights of the people of Southern Cameroons as a student leader of the University of Buea Students Union which worked together with the Southern Cameroons National Council (SCNC). He took an active part in the uprising of March 1997 against oppression and discrimination by the Cameroun government. . He was arrested and tried by a military tribunal. For the next six years he suffered a range of serious human rights violations at the hands of the Republic of Cameroun. These included torture, incommunicado detention, and a variety of forms of abuse in prison including being held in grossly overcrowded and unhygienic conditions, lack of proper food and wholly inadequate medical care. He suffered paralysis of his lower limbs and impaired vision as a result of torture and spent over 700 days in solitary confinement. In 1999 he was sentenced by the military tribunal to 20 years in prison. In 2003 he escaped to Nigeria and from there, after some 30 months evading arrest, he was re-settled in the USA where he lives today. From the United States, Akwanga continued the struggle for the Southern Cameroonian people. The NGO REDRESS lodged a petition on Ebenezer's behalf with the UN Human Rights Committee (UNHRC) for multiple breaches of the International Covenant on Civil and Political Rights (ICCPR), including torture, over the period 1997 to 2003. In a unanimous decision made on 22 March 2011 UNHRC upheld the petition brought by REDRESS on behalf of Ebenezer against Cameroon. The petition averred multiple breaches of the ICCPR. In 2011-2014, Ebenezer Akwanga, Ayaba Cho Lucas and other independence advocates founded a Southern Cameroons Government affiliated with an armed wing, SOCADEF. The government signed agreements with two Canadian public companies to promote future assets and resources in Southern Cameroons and legally contest ownership. The Camerounian government-controlled press later credited Akwanga's government with being one of the primary movers of the October 2017 Declaration of Independence of Ambazonia.

As of 2020, he heads the Organization of Emerging African States (OEAS), which advises African separatists. As of 2016, the organization is based in the US, and has campaigned for a referendum regarding an independent Biafra.

== Assassination attempts ==
The government of Cameroon has attempted to eliminate Akwanga on several occasions; in Buea, Southern Cameroons by poison in 2003, in Lagos, Nigeria in 2005 with at least three attempts by Cameroonian agents, and in South Africa in 2012 with a murder and kidnapping plot.

== Ambazonia campaign ==
The October 2017 Ambazonia Declaration of Independence resulted in Akwanga revitalizing and arming SOCADEF (Southern Cameroons Defense Force) as a self-defense force. According to International Crisis Group, SOCADEF, is one of the largest armed units operating in Ambazonia.
