= AmbaCoin =

Cryptocurrency

- Official logo of AmbaCoin

Denominations
- Code: AMBA

Development
- Initial release: 24 December 2018

Valuation
- Exchange rate: Floating

Website
- Website: ambacoin.io

AmbaCoin is the official cryptocurrency of Ambazonia. It was launched in 2018, and the ICO was from December 2018 to 2019. The Ambazonia Governing Council claims that all profits go towards their independence struggle and humanitarian aid. It is said to be backed by the "rich natural resources" of the breakaway region.

As of the 18th of July 2024, their main hub (transact.ambacoin.io) is currently a dead link.

== Proposal ==
In 2018, AmbaCoin was created with the intention of being the official currency of Ambazonia. Despite the AmbaCoin being a cryptocurrency, it cannot be used as an official currency due to many Ambazonians not having access to the internet, low internet literacy, and lack of proper electricity infrastructure; most residents have little to no access to electricity. Because of this, a new currency would have to be introduced if independence is attained, for day-to-day transactions and business matters. Several names have been suggested but none have been adopted officially. Examples include: the Amba, the Ambazonian Shilling, the Amba-Dollar, Southern Cameroonian Pound, Ambazonian Cowry (the historical currency that circulated along the coast of West Africa, mostly by traders and merchants, before the colonization of Africa), Njangi, Ambazonian Dinar, Ambazonian Qwid and the West African Eco (provided it joins the ECOWAS along with the WAMZ if or once independence is attained).
