= Fongum Gorji Dinka =

Cameroonian political activist

Fongum Gorji-Dinka
- Born: 22 June 1930 (age 96)
- Education: St. Joseph's College (Buea); Fulbright Program; Council of Legal Education; Sorbonne University
- Occupation: Lawyer
- Title: Fon of the Widikum

Fongum Gorji Dinka is a Cameroonian attorney, political activist, and Fon of the Widikum in northwestern Cameroon.

== Biography ==
Gorji Dinka was active in the Anglophone Crisis and advocated for more rights for Anglophone Cameroonians, against the Francophone government. He was the first president of the Cameroon Bar Association, and is also the named party of the Fongum Gorji Dinka v. Cameroon which was tried at the High Court of Justice and United Nations Human Rights Committee. Gorji Dinka also coined the place name Ambazonia, which he first used in 1984.

Along with Bernard Fonlon and Carlson Anyangwe he authored The New Social Order, which claimed that the English-Speaking regions of Cameroons had the right to secede from Cameroon.

He was arrested in May 1985 for his protests against the government and was detained until February 1986. After his release, he escaped to Nigeria.

In a 2005 judgment of the United Nations Human Rights ICCPR, the tribunal ruled in favor of compensation for Fon Gorji-Dinka for human rights abuses to his person and for assurances of the enjoyment of his civil and political rights.

== Bibliography ==
- Fongum, Gorji-Dinka (20 March 1985). "The New Social Order" (PDF). Retyped Ambazonian Archives. Archived (PDF) from the original on 17 June 2022.
