= Ambazonia =

Proclaimed political entity in Cameroon

The flag of Ambazonia, used by separatists since 1999

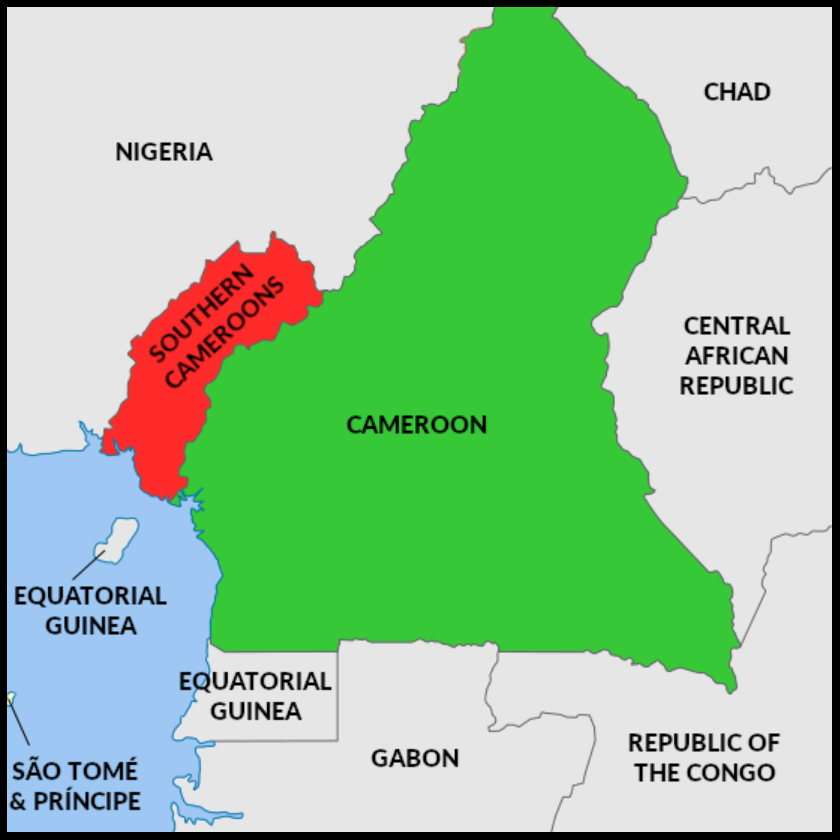
Territory (colored red) within Cameroon claimed by separatists, corresponding to the country's Northwest Region and Southwest Region

Ambazonia, alternatively the Federal Republic of Ambazonia or the State of Ambazonia, is a political entity proclaimed by Anglophone separatists seeking independence from Cameroon. The separatists claim that Ambazonia should consist of the Northwest Region and Southwest Region of Cameroon. Since 2017, Ambazonian rebels have engaged in armed conflict with the Cameroonian military, in what is known as the Anglophone Crisis, and have attempted to set up governments-in-exile, and supportive militias have exerted control over parts of the claimed territory. No country has recognized Ambazonia's existence as of 2026.

Until 1961, the territory of these regions was the southern part of a British trust territory, British Cameroon while the rest of Cameroon was a French trust territory, French Cameroon. At independence, a plebiscite was held, and voters in Southern Cameroons opted to join Cameroon as a constituent state of a federal republic. Over time, the power of the central government, dominated by Francophones, expanded at the expense of the region's autonomy. Many inhabitants identify as Anglophones and resent what they perceive as discrimination and efforts to eliminate Anglophone legal, administrative, educational, and cultural institutions by the Cameroonian government.

In 2016 and 2017, a widespread protest movement was met with a violent government crackdown, which led to rioting and violence against security forces and, in 2017, a unilateral declaration of independence by Ambazonian leaders. The violence developed into a guerrilla war, and as of 2023, clashes continue, with population centers and strategic locations largely controlled by the government engaged in counterinsurgency actions, with swathes of more remote, rural areas controlled by separatist militias and used to launch guerrilla attacks. Ambazonian forces have struggled to form a united front, and internecine conflicts have hampered efforts to negotiate with Cameroon or establish control over the various militia groups engaged in the fighting. Ongoing violence has led to widely reported human rights abuses by both sides, including indiscriminate killing of civilians, torture, rape and other gender-based crimes, unjustified detentions, and kidnappings.

== Etymology and terminology ==
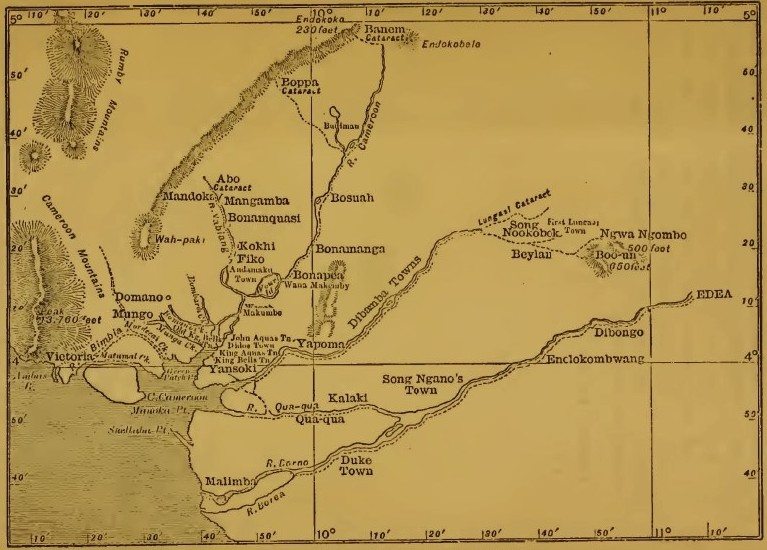
Colonial-era map showing Ambas Bay far left

The term "Ambazonia" is derived from the word Ambozes, the local name for the bay at the mouth of the Wouri River, known in English as Ambas Bay. The name was coined by Fon Gorji Dinka in 1984 as part of a campaign for the restoration of autonomy and preservation of Anglophone institutions in the region.

The term Ambazonia is more usually associated with the separatist or independence-seeking faction, while the Cameroonian government and other official sources, such as the UN, continue to refer to the "Northwest Region" and "Southwest Region" (or sometimes the "NoSo" regions), the official names of the two administrative provinces since 1972. As an alternative to "Ambazonia", separatists have also used "Ambaland". Other sources may also refer to "Southern Cameroons", "Anglophone Cameroon" or "Cameroon's Anglophone regions".

To refer to the French-speaking parts of Cameroon, Ambazonian separatists have used the term "la République" and more derogatory descriptors like "banana republic" or "colonial Cameroun". "Banana republic" is used as a criticism of the Cameroonian institutions, whereas "colonial Cameroun" is used to criticize the Francophone dominance. The Ambazonian activists call the war zone of the Anglophone Crisis "Ground Zero", a reference to the destruction caused by the civil war.

== Origins ==
=== Colonial contest in the region ===
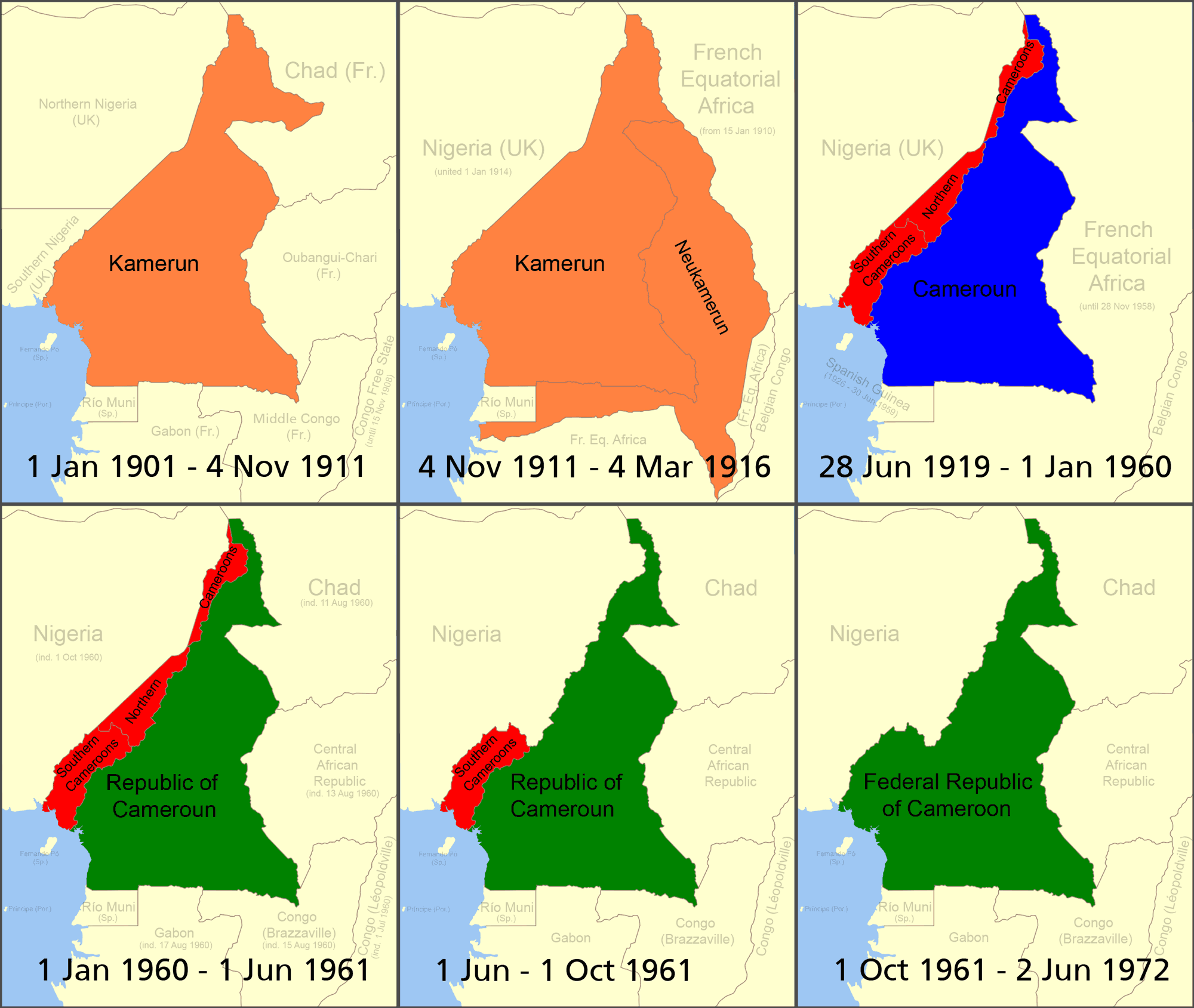
Boundary changes of Cameroon, 1901–1961.

The area around the mouth of the Wouri River is where the English language was permanently established for the first time in Southern Cameroons, when missionary Alfred Saker founded a settlement of freed slaves by Ambas Bay in 1858, which was later renamed Victoria (present-day Limbe). In 1884, the area became the British Ambas Bay Protectorate, with Victoria as its capital. Britain ceded the area to the German territory of Kamerun in 1887. Germany had some trouble establishing control over the hinterlands of Victoria, and fought the Bafut Wars against local fondoms until 1907.

Following World War I and the Treaty of Versailles, Kamerun was divided between a French and a British League of Nations Mandate. The French mandate was known as Cameroun, and comprised most of the former German territory. The British mandate was an elongated strip of land along the border of Colonial Nigeria, consisting of Northern Cameroons and Southern Cameroons, including the historical Ambas Bay Protectorate. This territory was organized as British Cameroons.

The British administered the territories through indirect rule, allowing native authorities to administer the population according to their own traditions. In 1953, the Southern Cameroons delegation at a conference in London asked for a separate region. The British agreed, and Southern Cameroons became an autonomous region with its capital still at Buea. Elections were held in 1954 and the parliament met on 1 October 1954, with E. M. L. Endeley as Premier.

=== 1961 referendum ===
The United Nations organised a plebiscite in the region on 11 February 1961 which put two alternatives to the people: union with Nigeria or union with Cameroon. The third option, independence, was opposed by the British representative to the UN Trusteeship Council, Sir Andrew Cohen, and as a result was not listed. In the plebiscite, 60% of voters in the Northern Cameroons voted for union with Nigeria, while 70% of voters in the Southern Cameroons opted for union with Cameroon. The results owed partly to a fear of domination by much larger Nigeria. Endeley was defeated in elections on 1 February 1959 by John Ngu Foncha.

Southern Cameroons federated with Cameroon on 1 October 1961 as "West Cameroon", with its own prime minister. However, the English-speaking peoples of the Southern Cameroons did not believe that they were fairly treated by the 80% majority French-speaking government of the country. Then-president Ahmadou Ahidjo feared that Southern Cameroons would secede from the union, taking its natural resources with it. Following a French Cameroon unilateral referendum on 20 May 1972, a new constitution was adopted in Cameroon which replaced the federal state with a unitary state, and also gave more power to the president. Southern Cameroons lost its autonomous status and became the Northwest Region and the Southwest Region of the Republic of Cameroon. Pro-independence groups claimed that this violated the constitution, as the majority of deputies from West Cameroon had not consented to legitimize the constitutional changes. They argued that Southern Cameroons had effectively been annexed by Cameroon. Shortly afterwards, French Cameroun's political leadership changed the constitution again, appointed French-speaking Paul Biya as Prime Minister and successor to Ahmadou Ahidjo.

In a memorandum dated 20 March 1985, Anglophone lawyer and President of the Cameroon Bar Association Fongum Gorji Dinka wrote that the Cameroonian government led by Paul Biya was unconstitutional and announced the former Southern Cameroons should become independent as the Republic of Ambazonia. Dinka was incarcerated the following January without trial. Three years later, he escaped to Nigeria.

=== Southern Cameroons National Council ===
In 1993, representatives of Anglophone groups convened the first All Anglophone Conference (AAC1) in Buea. The conference issued the "Buea Declaration", which called for constitutional amendments to restore the 1961 federation. This was followed by the second All Anglophone Conference (AAC2) in Bamenda in 1994. This conference issued the "Bamenda Declaration", which stated that if the federal state was not restored within a reasonable time, Southern Cameroons would declare its independence. The AAC was renamed the Southern Cameroons Peoples Conference (SCPC), and later the Southern Cameroons Peoples Organisation (SCAPO), with the Southern Cameroons National Council (SCNC) as the executive governing body. Younger activists formed the Southern Cameroons Youth League (SCYL) in Buea on 28 May 1995. The SCNC sent a delegation, led by John Foncha, to the United Nations, which was received on 1 June 1995 and presented a petition against the 'annexation' of the Southern Cameroons by French Cameroon. This was followed by a signature referendum the same year, which the organisers claim produced a 99% vote in favour of independence with 315,000 people voting.

SCNC activities were routinely disrupted by police. On 23 March 1997, about ten people were killed in a raid on a gendarme camp in Bamenda. The police arrested between 200 and 300 people, mostly SCNC supporters, but also members of the Social Democratic Front, an opposition party with significant support in the Anglophone regions. In the subsequent trials, Amnesty International and the SCNC found substantive evidence of admissions through torture and force. The raid and trial resulted in a shutdown of SCNC activities. In response to this, in April 1998 a small faction elected Esoka Ndoki Mukete, a high-ranking member of the Social Democratic Front, as the new chair of the SCNC. In October 1999, when many of the accused were found guilty in the 1997 trial, the faction led by Mukete became more assertive. On 1 October 1999, militants took over Radio Buea to proclaim the independence of Southern Cameroons, but failed to do so before security forces intervened. The leadership and many members of the SCNC were subsequently arrested. After clashes with the police, the SCNC was officially declared illegal by the Cameroonian authorities in 2001. In 2006, a faction of SCNC once again declared the independence of Ambazonia.

=== Protests and Anglophone Crisis ===
In November 2016, a number of large protests and strikes were organized, initially by Anglophone lawyers, students, and teachers focused on the growing marginalization of English and Anglophone institutions in the law and education. Several demonstrations were violently dispersed by security forces, leading to clashes between demonstrators and police in which several people were killed. Violence by both sides undermined negotiations in early 2017, which fell apart without an agreement. The violence led to additional demonstrations, general strikes (called "lockdowns"), and further crackdowns by the government into early 2017, including the banning of civil society organizations, cutting off phone and internet connections from January to April, and arrests of demonstrators. Although the government established a Commission to focus on Anglophone grievances and took steps to address issues of language equity in courts and schools, continued distrust and harsh responses to protests prevented significant deescalation.

By late 2017, with dialogue efforts moribund and violence continuing on both sides, the leading Ambazonian nationalist movements organized the umbrella organization Southern Cameroons Ambazonia Consortium United Front (SCACUF). SCACUF unilaterally declared the region's independence as Ambazonia on 1 October, the anniversary of Southern Cameroons' independence from the United Kingdom. SCACUF sought to transition itself into an interim government with its leader, Sisiku Ayuk Tabe Julius, as interim president. At least 17 people were killed in protests following the declaration of independence, while fourteen Cameroonian troops were killed in attacks claimed by the Ambazonia Defence Forces. The Cameroonian government stated that the declaration had no legal weight and on 30 November 2017, the President of Cameroon signaled a harder line on separatist attacks on police and soldiers. A massive military deployment accompanied by curfews and forced evacuations of entire villages. This temporarily ended hopes for continued dialogue and kicked off full-fledged guerilla war in Southern Cameroons. Several different armed factions have emerged such as the Red Dragons, Tigers, ARA, Seven Kata, ABL, with varying levels of coordination with and loyalty to Ambazonian political leaders. In practice, pro-independence militias operate largely autonomously from political leaders, who are mostly in exile.

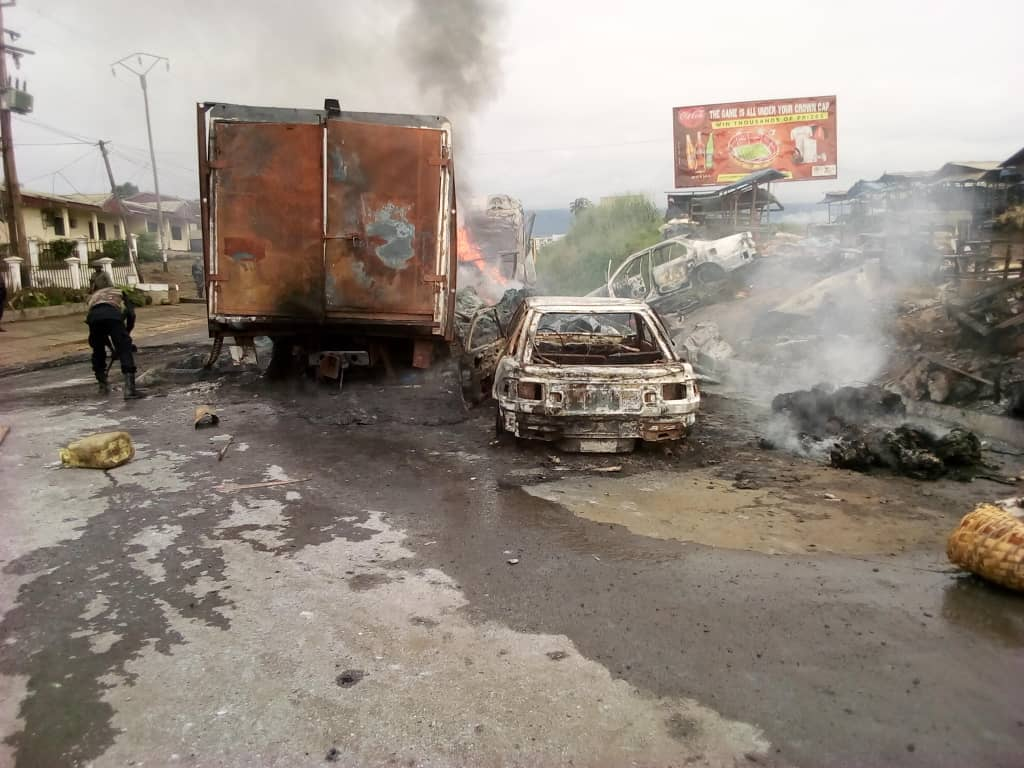
Destroyed vehicles after a clash in Buea, South West Cameroon

On 5 January 2018, members of the Ambazonia Interim Government in exile in Abuja, Nigeria, including President Sisiku Julius Ayuk Tabe, were arrested and deported to Cameroon into the custody of government forces to face criminal charges. On 4 February 2018, it was announced that US-based preacher Dr. Samuel Ikome Sako would become the Interim President of the Federal Republic of Ambazonia, temporarily succeeding Ayuk Tabe. However, despite receiving a life sentence on terrorism charges from a Cameroon court, on 2 May 2019, Ayuk Tabe declared from prison the dissolution of Sako's caretaker cabinet and the restoration of his own cabinet. Sako resisted, leading to the 2019 Ambazonian leadership crisis.

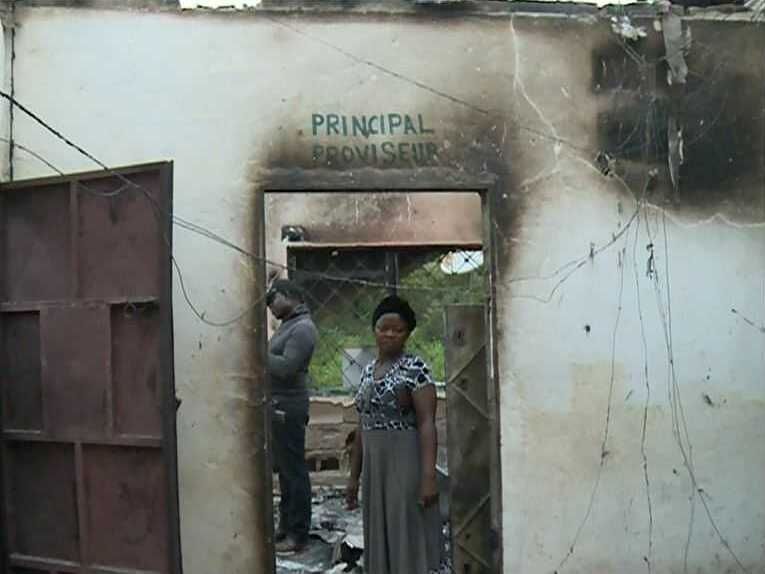
Destroyed school in Fontem, South West Cameroon

As the violence intensified, international efforts to resolve the crisis picked up. On 13 May 2019, the United Nations Security Council had an informal meeting to discuss the Anglophone Crisis. Peace talks mediated by the Swiss government have fallen apart multiple times, primarily due to factional divisions and lack of actual control over militias by separatist leaders making even preliminary steps difficult.

The war has been characterized by guerilla attacks by separatist militias against both security forces and against civilians suspected of collaboration or simply failing to abide militia's declared school and election boycotts or "lockdowns" which prevent all travel and activity. Many militias have sought to enforce a total school strike since 2017 due to concerns over the lack of Anglophone teachers and curriculum. Teachers and students have been kidnapped and killed and many schools and school materials burned while many children have had no schooling since the crisis began. Others have alleged that some militias have engaged in ransom attacks against civilians to fund their continued activities. Meanwhile, government forces have torched entire villages suspected of harboring separatists, disappeared and executed civilians without due process, and tortured detainees. Reports of indiscriminate killings, torture, rape and other gender-based violence by both sides have been widely reported. The governments of the United States and Germany have expressed concern over the human rights violations and scaled back or cancelled military cooperation with Cameroon over reported abuses. France, the UK as well as the European Parliament have also expressed concern and pushed for negotiations between the parties to resolve the crisis.

== Separatist forces ==
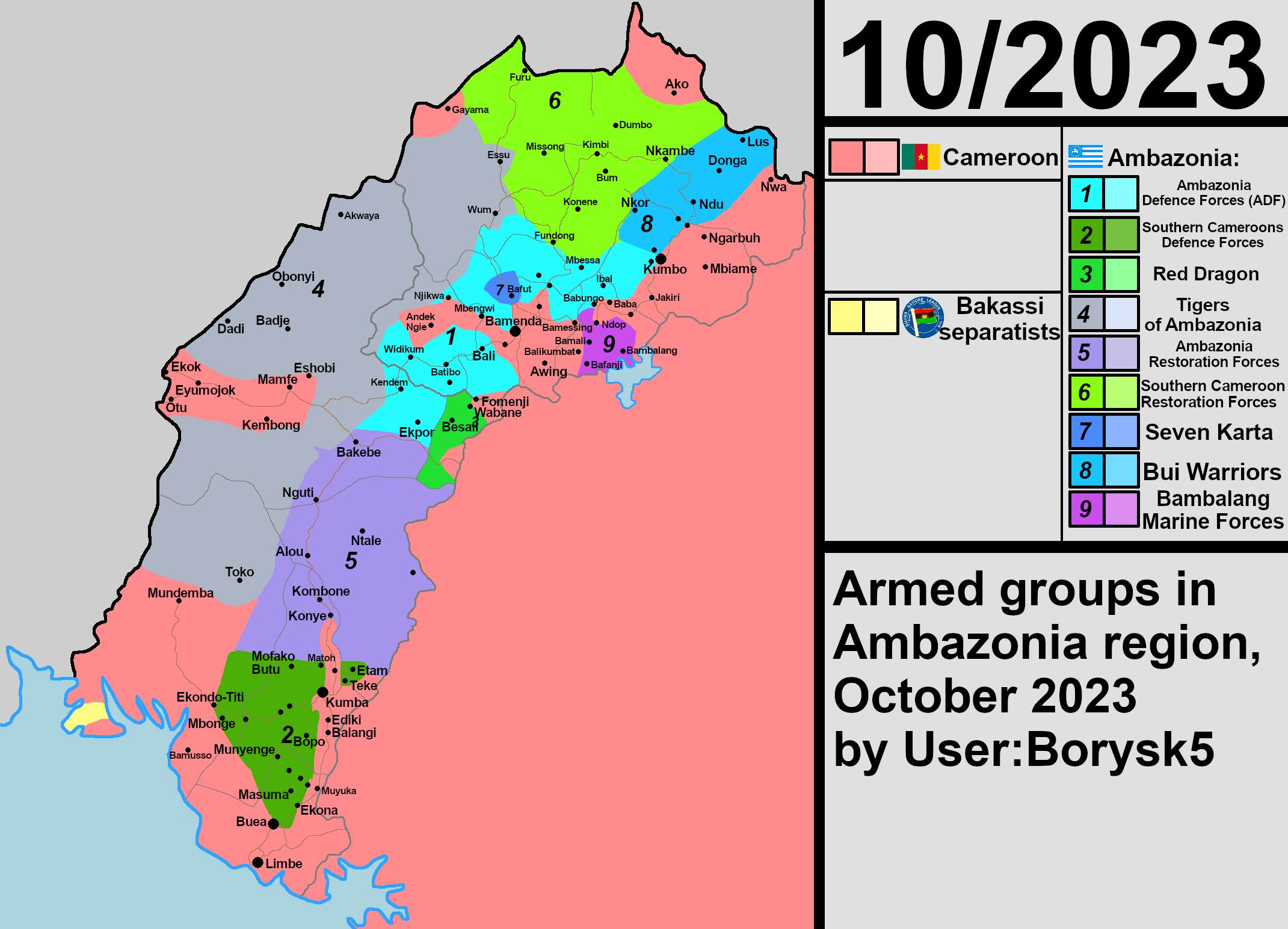
Map of military situation of the Anglophone Crisis by 2023, with Ambazonian separatist control or presence marked per rebel militia

=== Interim government and exile groups ===
Some of the separatists assert that Ambazonia is legally governed by the "Interim Government of Ambazonia", as a provisional government in exile. In course of the insurgency, however, this government-in-exile splintered several times, resulting in infighting and several factions claiming to be the legitimate leadership of Ambazonia. This infighting hampered the coordination among the rebels as well as negotiations between separatists and the Cameroonian government.

Despite the Interim Government's internal disputes, its members and other exile activists have maintained some influence over the separatist militias operating in Cameroon itself. For instance, separatist exiles have organized fundraising campaigns which included the introduction of their own cryptocurrency, the AmbaCoin; the resulting money is then used to buy weaponry for the militias on the ground. The commanders of some militias also operate from exile.

In order to provide the separatist movement with some cohesion and strengthen the idea of an Ambazonian nation state, exile activists have also set up a variety of other organizations to support the Interim Government. These include the "Southern Cameroons Ambazonia Consortium United Front" (SCACUF), the "Southern Cameroon Broadcasting Corporation" (SCBC) to spread propaganda, and a "Southern Cameroon Ambazonia Education Board" (SCAEB) to enforce a new curriculum in schools in the rebel areas. Currently, a proposal by members of the Ambazonia Interim Government in exile states that the Federal Republic of Ambazonia would be a federation made up of three autonomous states (however, within the proposed constitution in 'Article 1, Section 1.a' this number may be subject to change).

=== Media ===
Ambazonian separatists have a major presence in the Internet, and effectively use social media to spread their ideas. In the early phase of the Anglophone Crisis, the "Southern Cameroons Broadcasting Corporation" (formed by exiles in South Africa) was a major channel to distribute propaganda in Cameroon to incite Anglophones into siding with the rebels. Cameroon attempted to then ban the channel, but failed as people could still view it on the internet. On the same day the BBC reported that, Voice of America reported that a cable TV distributor got arrested for four days for airing images of the SCBC. On social media platforms such as Facebook, hate speech, propaganda and disinformation have been shown by both sides. The Ambazonians have been accused of using fake news headlines and photo manipulation. Over the course of the insurgency, Ambazonian insurgents have also framed their struggle in religious terms to gain support.

=== Rebel groups ===
The separatist insurgents involved in the Anglophone Crisis consider themselves loyal to Ambazonia and use the Ambazonian national symbols, but they are split into dozens of often competing militias of changing political allegiances. The militia commanders have been described as "warlords" by researchers. The armed separatists are locally called "Amba Boys". The militias generally vary in size, ranging from small groups to alliances with hundreds of members. The rebel militias are mainly recruited from Anglophone youths who have either lost family members to Cameroonian security forces or believe that they have no future on the labour market of a Francophone Cameroon. Militias are also known to conscript people, including children, into their ranks. Some rebels have also kidnapped girls to serve as sex slaves.

Many guerilla groups have joined the Ambazonia Self-Defence Council (ASC) under the Interim Government. Major non-ASC groups include the Ambazonia Defence Forces (ADF) and the Southern Cameroons Defence Forces (SOCADEF), which both cooperate with the ASC on some level. There are also dozens of smaller militias. The insurgent groups differ considerably in their aims and methods, though they generally enjoy some level of grassroots support among the rural population. However, civilian support suffered over the rebellion's course, as a growing number of locals became dissatisfied with the separatists' conduct, rebel infighting, and the conflict's extended duration. By early 2025, infighting among the separatists had significantly increased compared to the insurgency's early stages, as had rebel attacks on civilians. Most rebel groups engage to some level in criminal activities such as kidnapping for ransom and illegally taxing the local cocoa industry to sustain themselves.

A significant number of rebels also use religion to justify their operations. Protective magic and charms (odeshi) are important to many insurgents, but "de-contextualised Biblical and Koranic verses" are also used in propaganda videos. Rebel leaders such as General No Pity have publicly suggested that they enjoy mythical and religious protection to enhance their reputation.

== Language ==
Ambazonians generally use the Cameroonian English dialect. However, separatist forces have also developed a unique slang in the context of the insurgency. For instance, rebels call their camps "churches", conveying deeper spiritual meaning to these important places where insurgents can organize and hide. Researcher Rodrick Lando also speculated that the term "church" was connected to the rebels conducting rituals invoking protective magic at their camps. Similarly, some rebels refer to their guns as "bibles" and their attacks as "crusades", whereas others use the terms "sugarcane" or "stick" for weapons and "groundnuts" for cartridges. Lando argued that the usage of more sacrosanct terms by only some rebel factions may have resulted from the internal disagreements within the separatist movement. In contrast, the term "frying popcorn" for combat situations is very common among rebels. When rebels state that they "wasted" an individual, they describe an assassination. Traitors are termed "blacklegs". Those who had suffered amputations, often as a result of torture by rebel militias, are described as "short-sleeved", while the act of cutting off someone's fingers is termed "garri".

== See also ==
- AmbaCoin
- Biafra
- Southern Cameroons
- Timeline of the Anglophone Crisis
