= Ambas Bay =

Bay in southwestern Cameroon

- Baie d'Ambas (French)
- Location in Cameroon
- Coordinates: 4°00′N 9°11′E
- Ocean/sea sources: Gulf of Guinea; Atlantic Ocean
- Basin countries: Cameroon
- Max. length: 9 km (5.6 mi)
- Max. width: 3.8 km (2.4 mi)

Ambas Bay is a bay of southwest Cameroon.

== Geography ==
The bay opens towards the Gulf of Guinea. The port of Limbe lies on the shore of Ambas Bay.

== History ==
Alfred Saker founded a settlement of freed slaves on the bay in 1858, which was later renamed Victoria. in 1884 Britain established the Ambas Bay Protectorate, of which Victoria was the capital. It was then ceded to Germany in 1887.

=== Colonial governors of Ambas Bay ===
Tenure	Incumbent	Notes
Victoria Colony
1858	Foundation of Victoria Colony by English Baptist Missionary Society	
1858 to 1876	Alfred Saker, Administrator	
1877 to 1878	George Grenfell, Administrator	
1878 to 1879	Q. W. Thomson, Administrator	
1879 to July 1884	..., Administrator	
British Ambas Bay Protectorate
19 July 1884		
July 1884 to 21 April 1885	Edward H. Hewitt, Administrator	
21 April 1885 to 28 March 1887	..., Administrator	
28 March 1887	Ambas Bay becomes part of German possessions	

== See also ==
- Communes of Cameroon
