= Southern Cameroons National Council =

Political organisation in Cameroon

- Logo of the SCNC
- Leader: Frederick Alobwede Ebong
- Vice-Chairman: Nfor Ngala Nfor
- Founded: 1995
- Ideology: Separatism

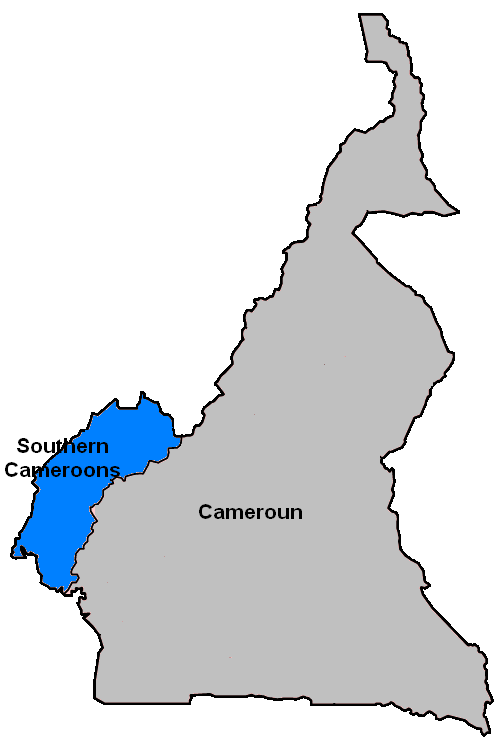
Map of the Southern Cameroons area within the boundaries of Cameroon.

The Southern Cameroons National Council (SCNC) is a political organisation seeking the independence of the former anglophone Southern Cameroons from the predominantly francophone Republic of Cameroon (République du Cameroun) and achieving unification with neighbouring Nigeria. It is a non-violent organisation with the motto "The force of argument, not the argument of force." Because the SCNC advocates secession from Cameroon, it has been declared an illegal organisation by the government of Paul Biya. Security forces regularly interrupt SCNC meetings, arresting members and typically detaining them for several days before release.

== Creation ==
After achieving independence in the 1960s, Cameroon took territorial control over the area of formerly British-administered Southern Cameroons and adopted a federal structure giving some autonomy to the former British area as the federated state of West Cameroon. In 1972 President Ahmadou Ahidjo through a fraudulent referendum terminated the federal system, in favour of a unitary state. When Biya came to power in 1982, he continued centralising power and created a single-party state. In 1993, the All Anglophone Conference formed pushing for a return to the autonomy provided to the Southern Cameroons under the federal system. In 1994, the Bamenda Declaration of large members of the AAC decided to work toward secession rather than autonomy. This resulted the next year in the creation of the Southern Cameroon People's Conference (SCPC) formed as an umbrella organisation bringing together student, trade organisations, and political organisations committed to independence, rather than a return to autonomy. The Southern Cameroons National Council was the elected body in charge of organising SCPC efforts with the initial chairman being Sam Ekontang Elad.

== 1990s ==
In 1995, the SCNC rose to political prominence with a host of efforts to push for secession of the anglophone Southern Cameroons from the country of Cameroon. The government of Cameroon was finishing its application to join the Commonwealth of Nations and the SCNC organised a number of publicity activities to oppose this inclusion. In August 1995, the SCNC petitioned the UN to intervene and mediate between them and the government of Cameroon warning that a lack of intervention would create "another Somalia". In October 1995, the SCNC publicised a plan schedule of work for an eventual declaration of independence. These political activities resulted in significant disruption by police and security forces.

In 1996, Chair Elad resigned and was replaced by Henry Fossung. Activities were routinely disrupted by police and plans for independence were scuttled consistently. March 1997 produced the arrest of 200 supporters for a supposed attack on security forces in Bamenda. In the trials for the 200, Amnesty International and the SCNC found substantive evidence of admissions through torture and force. The raid and trial resulted in a shutdown of SCNC activities and Fossung taking a low profile. In response to this, in April 1998 a small faction elected Esoka Ndoki Mukete, a high-ranking member of the Social Democratic Front, as the new chair of the SCNC. The decision was opposed by Fossung and the powerful SCNC-North America and the result was paralysis of the organisation.

The divisive council remained over much of 1998 and early 1999 until October 1999 when the government found multiple members guilty in the 1997 trial. Although the faction led by Fossung opposed a unilateral declaration of independence, the faction led by Mukete became more assertive. While Mukete was officially travelling abroad, a small group took over Radio Buea and proclaimed the establishment of Southern Cameroons as an independent and legal political force. Mukete's role in the SCNC was reduced and multiple members, including the leadership were arrested.

In 2000, the SCNC resolved the leadership dispute by electing Frederick Ebong Alobwede the new chairman and considered him the first President of the Southern Cameroons.

== 2001−present ==
Repression of the group increased significantly in 2001 when the organisation was declared illegal and clashes with police at a demonstration resulted in multiple deaths. As a result, multiple international offices and branches of the SCNC have opened and engaged in political activities. In 2001, a group of exile-SCNC-members founded a so-called "South Cameroon's Embassy" in the German town of Frankfurt. The group boycotted the 2002 municipal elections in Cameroon and the 2004 presidential election. The government has continued with "arbitrary and unlawful" detention of members, often with mass arrests at peaceful gatherings.

In 2006, a faction formally declared the Republic of Ambazonia and a military wing known as the Southern Cameroon Peoples Organization (SCAPO) begun activity. In 2007, this group claimed responsibility for an attack on the Cameroonian military in Bakassi.

International recognition remained limited although the group became part of the Unrepresented Nations and Peoples Organization in 2006. In 2009, the African Union (AU), with support from Muammar Gaddafi, began considering efforts regarding the SCNC call for independence. However, in late 2009, the African Commission on Human and Peoples' Rights rejected the SCNC's petition and slowed the efforts by the group in the AU.

The 2012 Amnesty International Report on Cameroon found that the security forces continue to disrupt SCNC activities. In February 2011, Chief Ayamba Ette Otun was arrested while travelling through the country. He was released soon afterwards without charge. In October 2011, a meeting in Buea was disrupted and 50 members were arrested and released without charge days later.

In June 2014, longtime SCNC Chairman Chief Ayamba Ette Otun died aged 91; the current chairman is Dr. Peter Forchu Chesami.

On 31 March 2019, the SCNC and several Ambazonian movements agreed to create the Southern Cameroons Liberation Council, a united front consisting of both separatists and federalists.
