= Afowiri Fondzenyuy =

Cameroonian marathon runner and philanthropist

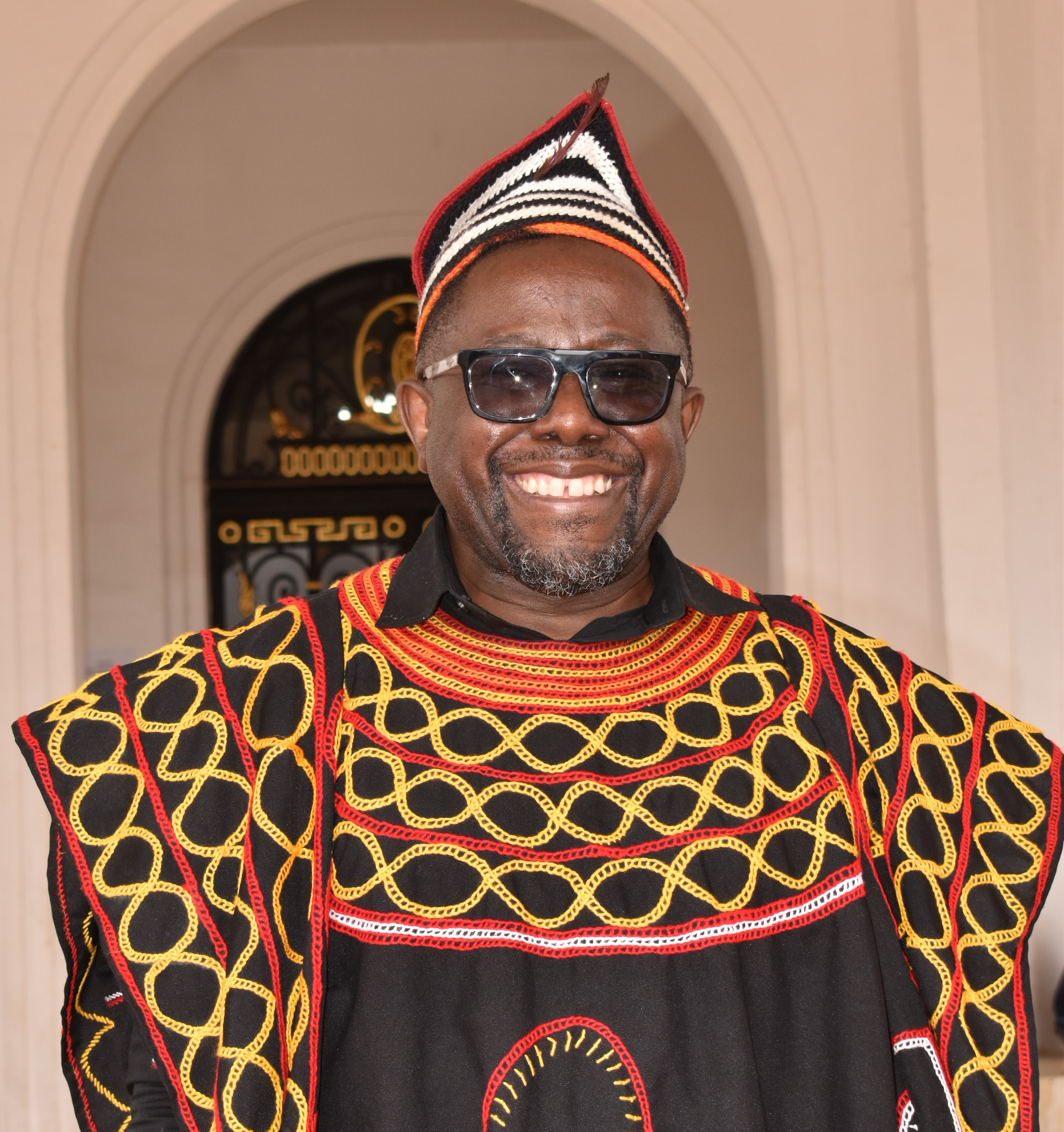
- Afowiri In 2025
- Born: Afowiri Kizito Fondzenyuy; 26 December 1972 (age 53); Bamenda, Cameroon
- Other name: Toghu Marathoner
- Education: University of St. Thomas in Houston; Harvard Kennedy School; Tulane University
- Occupations: Marathon runner philanthropist social entrepreneur
- Known for: Guinness World Records holder for fastest Toghu marathoner
- Spouse: Alice N. Fondzenyuy (m. 2011)
- Children: 3
- Awards: Abbott World Marathon Majors
- Website: toghumarathoner.com

Afowiri Kizito Fondzenyuy (French pronunciation: [a.fo.wi.ʁi ki.zi.to fɔ̃.dzɛ.nɥi] born 26 December 1972) Nicknamed the Toghu Marathoner, is a Cameroonian philanthropist, social entrepreneur, charity fundraiser, and long-distance marathon enthusiast, who runs marathons in Toghu attire to raise funds for various charitable causes. He holds the Guinness World Record for the fastest marathon run in traditional Toghu attire. and is an Abbott Major Marathon Six Star finisher.

Fondzenyuy began participating in marathons in early 2011, initially competing in triathlons that combined swimming, cycling, and running.

He is the founder of the Amom Foundation, a non-governmental organization, and also established African BBQ Sauce (ABS), a food brand based in the United States.

== Early life and education ==
Afowiri Fondzenyuy was born on 26 December 1972, in Bamenda, northwest Cameroon, to John L. Fondzenyuy and Mariana. He attended several primary schools in Cameroon, including those in Bafoussam and Yaoundé. He completed secondary school at Sacred Heart College in Mankon, Covent High School and subsequently attended high school at GHS Mbengwi in Cameroon. Afowiri earned a bachelor's degree in economics from the University of Dschang in Cameroon and a master's degree in business administration and international studies from the University of St. Thomas in Houston, Texas, USA, in 2006.

Fondzenyuy completed the Advanced Management Program at Harvard Kennedy School in 2014. He also holds a Master’s degree in Finance, with a specialization in financial engineering, from Tulane University, earned in 2009.

== Marathon running and Guinness World Record ==
Fondzenyuy began running marathons at the age of 40. Before taking up marathon running, he competed in triathlons which included swimming, cycling, and running, As swimming grew more difficult, he shifted his focus entirely to long-distance running.

In 2011 when he participated in the Thunder Road Marathon in Charlotte, North Carolina, United States, to raise funds for underprivileged children. He also took part in the Houston Marathon in 2017.

Fondzenyuy started wearing the traditional Toghu attire during marathons in 2019, starting with the Virgin Money London Marathon. and the Boston, Athens, and Sydney Marathons in 2023.

In 2024, he set a Guinness World Record for marathon running, becoming the first man to hold the record for the fastest marathon run completed while wearing a Toghu attire. finishing the Tokyo Marathon in 4 hours and 24 minutes. Fondzenyuy received support from high-profile Cameroonians, including Henri Dikongué, Mr. Leo, and Christopher John Lamora, who cheered him after the Tokyo 2024 Marathon. With the Tokyo race, he also joined the Abbott World Marathon Majors Six Star Finishers, having completed the six major marathons, Tokyo, Boston, London, Berlin, Chicago, and New York, while representing Cameroon.

In September 2024, Fondzenyuy took part in the Medellín Marathon in Colombia, to raise funds for underprivileged children. On 25 March 2025, Fondzenyuy participated in the Antarctica Marathon, completing the race in an official time of 6 hours and 52 minutes. This marked his 19th international marathon and his sixth continent completed in running marathons around the world.

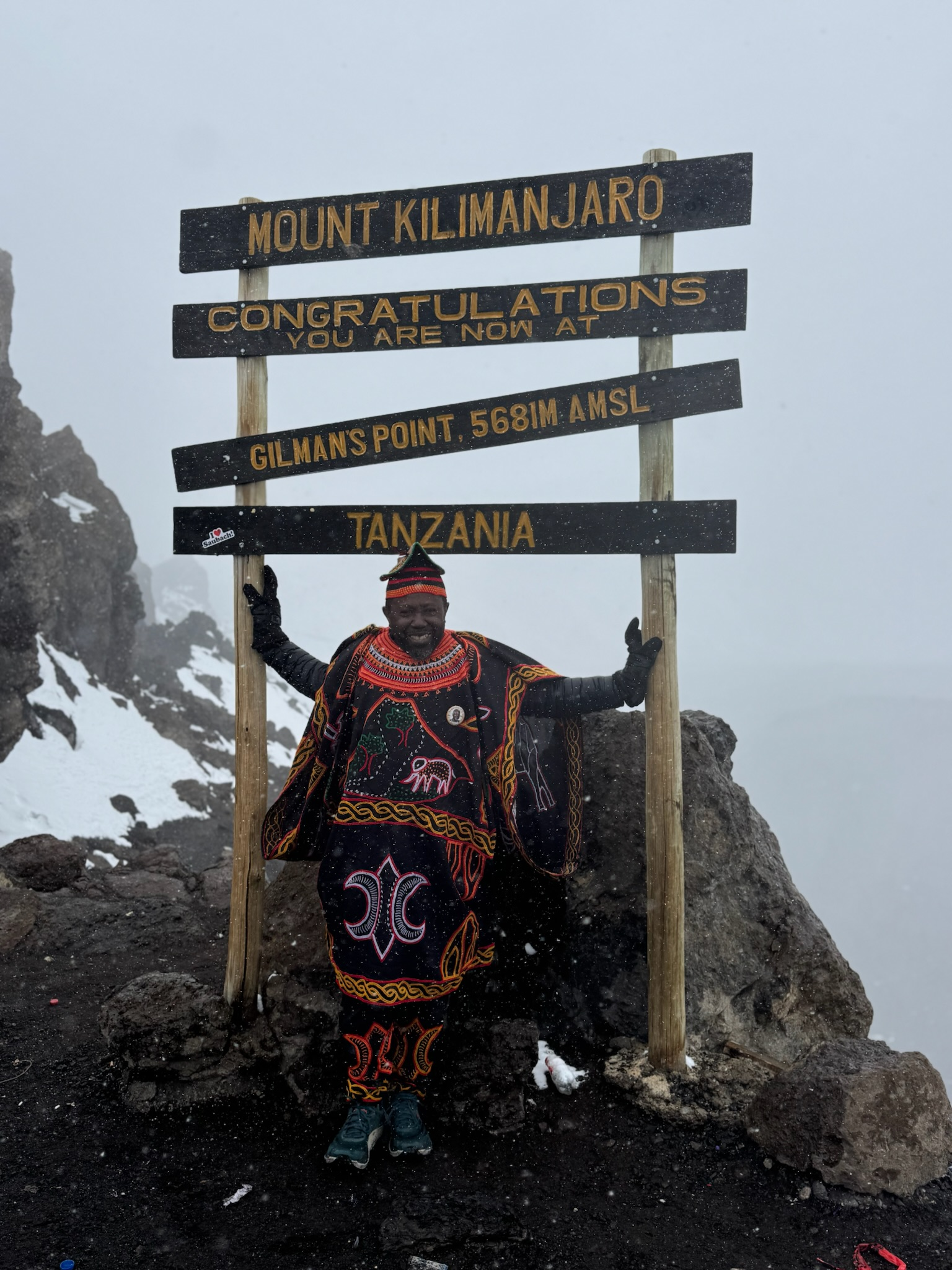
Fondzenyuy standing at Gilman’s Point on Mount Kilimanjaro, Tanzania.

In early 2026, he announced plans to participate in the Kilimanjaro Summit Marathon. The event was scheduled to be his twentieth official marathon and the final race required to complete the Seven Continents Marathon Challenge.

In February 2026, he took part in the Kilimanjaro Summit Marathon, an event held at high altitude with demanding weather conditions. The course is located on Mount Kilimanjaro, the highest point on the African continent. With the Completion of the event, he became one of the athletes from Cameroon to have completed the challenge.

== Charitable activity and fundraising ==
In 2006, Fondzenyuy founded the Amom Foundation, a non-governmental organization to support underprivileged communities through education, health, and infrastructure development. Through the foundation, he has contributed to various causes, including autism awareness, school construction, and providing educational materials to children in rural areas.

Notable initiatives by Fondzenyuy includes school construction in communities like Nfiengong in Cameroon’s North West Region’s Donga-Mantung Division. He has also made donations of didactic material, readers, and arithmetic tools to schools in Bui and Donga-Mantung Divisions, before the regional socio-political crisis, reaching over 20,000 children with these efforts.

He participated in the Tokyo Marathon, which is part of the World Marathon Majors (WMM) series, in 2024 with the objective of raising funds for infrastructure in Cameroon, the proceeds from which are used to construct bridges in rural communities such as Ngondzen in Bui Division to enhance access to schools. His participation in the Boston Marathon was for mobilizing funds for projects among underprivileged children. His participation in the London and Sydney Marathon was for mobilizing funds in favor of programs for creating awareness of autism.

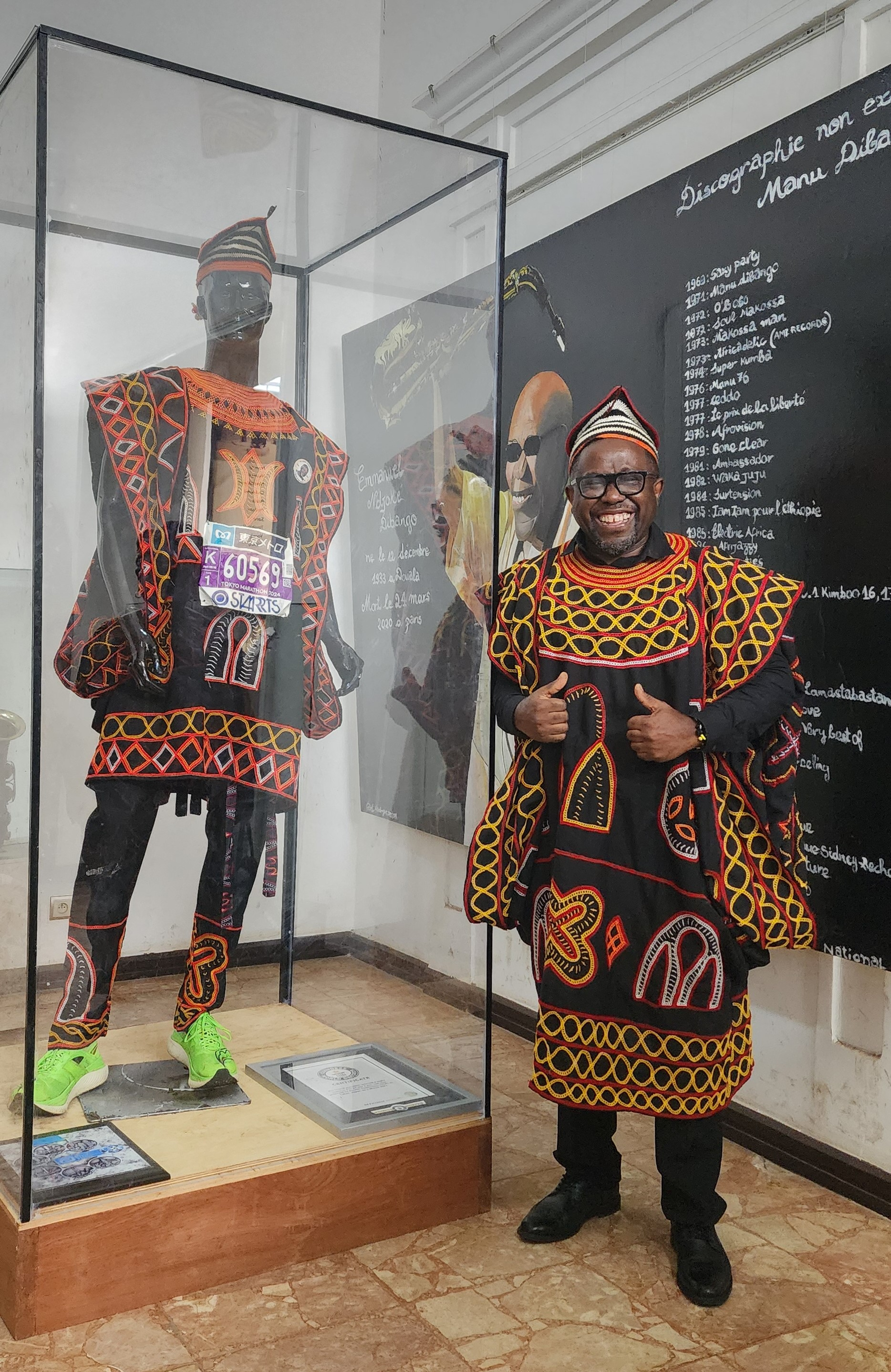
Afowiri Standing beside the donated Toghu in Yaounde

Following his 2025 Antarctica Marathon, he directed proceeds toward education projects in Cameroonian communities. That same year, he donated the Toghu attire from the Tokyo Marathon and his Guinness World Records certificate for running in traditional dress to the National Museum of Cameroon in Yaoundé.

Fondzenyuy has also been an advocate for children with autism. He has supported awareness programs and announced plans to establish an autism center in Yaoundé as a pilot initiative of a nationwide project that will cost an estimated 50 million FCFA and be funded from private resources. In his 2025 Cameroon Tribune interview, Fondzenyuy stated, "The autism center will be an environment where when kids come in, they will like to come to school every day."

TEDxAfrica

In September 2026, Fondzenyuy spoke at TEDxKubwa, an event held in Abuja, Nigeria. His talk was titled "They Were Never Given a Voice. So, I Used My Legs".

== Personal life ==
In 2011, Fondzenyuy married Alice N. The couple has three daughters: Verma, Nalowa, and Seevi. He resides between Cameroon and the United States and frequently travels to participate in marathons and speaking engagements. He is also the founder of African BBQ Sauce (ABS), a U.S.-based food brand.

== Marathons ==
Marathon results timeline
| Marathon | 2011 | 2013 | 2014 | 2017 | 2018 | 2019 | 2020 | 2021 | 2023 | 2024 | 2025 | 2026 |
|---|---|---|---|---|---|---|---|---|---|---|---|---|
| Tokyo Marathon | – | – | – | – | – | – | – | – | – | 4:24:02 | – | – |
| Boston Marathon | – | – | – | – | – | – | – | – | 5:18:54 | – | – | – |
| Antarctica Marathon | – | – | – | – | – | – | – | – | – | – | 6:52:47 | – |
| Houston Marathon | 5:44:31 | – | – | – | – | – | x | – | – | – | – | – |
| Berlin Marathon | – | – | – | – | – | 4:19:55 | – | – | – | – | – | – |
| London Marathon | – | – | – | – | – | – | – | 5:22:40 | – | – | – | – |
| Medellín Marathon | – | – | – | – | – | – | x | – | – | 4:51:08 | – | – |
| Thunder Road Marathon | 4:19:43 | – | 4:56:46 | – | – | – | x | – | – | – | – | – |
| Chicago Marathon | – | – | 4:45:21 | – | – | – | – | – | – | – | – | – |
| New York City Marathon | – | 4:35:26 | – | – | – | – | – | – | – | – | – | – |
| Sydney Marathon | – | – | – | – | – | – | – | – | 5:49:2 | – | – | – |
| Kilimanjaro Summit Marathon | – | – | – | – | – | – | – | – | – | – | – | 20:09:14 |

== Honors and accolades ==
In 2023, Fondzenyuy was honored with the Presidential volunteer Service Award, also known as the President's Lifetime Achievement Award, for his volunteer work dedicated to public service. Fondzenyuy was honored in a special audience with Henri Étoundi Essomba, Ambassador of Cameroon to the United States, at the Embassy in Washington, D.C. in 2025.

- The six World Marathon Majors (Berlin, Tokyo, Boston, London, Chicago and New York)

=== World records ===
List of world records achieved by Fondzenyuy
| Publication | Year | World record | R. status | Ref. |
|---|---|---|---|---|
| Guinness World Records | 2024 | Fastest marathon run in traditional Toghu attire | Record | |
