= Sacred Heart College, Bamenda =

Sacred Heart College Mankon
- Bamenda, North-West; Cameroon

Information
- Type: Private Secondary boarding school
- Religious affiliation: Catholicism
- Patron saint: Sacred Heart of Jesus
- Established: 21 January 1961; 65 years ago
- Founder: Mill Hill Missionaries
- Oversight: Archdiocese of Bamenda
- School code: Center Number 11031
- Principal: Fr. Ernest Timchia Tubuo
- Gender: Boys
- Classes: Form One to Five and High School
- Average class size: 50
- Language: English
- Houses: Saint Peter, Saint John Saint Francis, Saint Thomas
- Colors: Red, white and black
- Sports: soccer, basketball, tennis, volleyball
- Nickname: SAHECO, SHC
- Rival: Other schools
- Newspaper: SAHECO Echoes
- Graduates: ~4000
- Alumni: Sacred Heart College Ex-Students Association (SHESA)
- Anthem: "O Sacred Heart, Our Home Lies Deep in Thee"
- Sister college: Our Lady of Lourdes College

Sacred Heart College (abbreviated as SAHECO) is a private Catholic secondary boarding school for boys, located in Mankon, Northwest Region of Cameroon. It is managed by the Archdiocese of Bamenda, and is known for producing some of the best results in the General Certificate of Education Ordinary and Advanced Levels in Cameroon.

Originally created by the Mill Hill Missionaries, the school was handed over to the Marist Brothers who managed it for decades, before eventually ceding control to the Archdiocese of Bamenda.

== History ==
Sacred Heart College came into existence on 21 January 1961 with Fr Thomas Mulligan (MHM) as the pioneer Principal. Motivated by the need to cater for students from Bamenda who passed the entrance examination into Saint Joseph's College, Sasse located hundreds of kilometres away, Fr Thomas Mulligan put together the first cohort of 30 boys at R.C.M Big Mankon due to the lack of appropriate infrastructure. This single-sex boarding school which was officially inaugurated on 8 July 1965 by His Excellency Augustine Ngom Jua, at the time Prime Minister of West Cameroon, later metamorphosed into a full-fledged secondary education institute in 1978 with the creation of the sixth form. As at 2013, the student enrolment stood at 880, with 52 teachers and 21 auxiliary staff. Apart from excelling in academics, Sacred Heart students are well known for their sporting talents and discipline.

Rev. Brother John Phillips summoned a meeting of the alumni on 2 May 1972, following the regrettable absence of ex-students at the 10-year anniversary of SAHECO with the purpose of brainstorming on the establishment of an alumni association. On June 12, the Sacred Heart Ex-Students Association (SHESA) was born and its first executive was formed with Mr Ebot Ntui as the National President, and Mr. Ngwambe Fuh Gabriel as the Vice President. The principal mission of SHESA is promoting the alma mater's teachings, which include academic excellence, fraternity, civil responsibility, service, god-fearing, and morally upright attitude. To date, the Association has more than ten chapters with some of them in the United States of America and Europe. Ex-students of this institution are fondly called; SHESANS or Mishe.

SHESANS engage in different acts of charity in their various communities, as well as contribute towards assisting the development and management of their alma-mater. On 18 September 2017, a dormitory got burned in what was suspected to be an arson attack perpetrated by separatist fighters due to the ongoing Anglophone Crisis, prompting the mobilization of ex-students and well-wishers who quickly raised funds for the reconstruction of the damaged building.

SHESA recently launched a microfinance institution called SHESA Credit Union with Head office in Yaoundé.

=== Golden Jubilee (1961 - 2011) ===
In January 2011, Sacred Heart College, Mankon celebrated 50 years of existence marked with celebrations in Cameroon as well as other parts of the world including; Germany, the USA, and the United Kingdom. The celebrations on campus commenced with Holy Mass officiated by Christian Cardinal Tumi and Archbishop Cornelius Fontem Esua in the presence of Fon Angwafo III of Mankon, who 50 years ago offered land for the construction of this college, state dignitaries, parents, students, members of staff, ex-students and well-wishers. The Golden Jubilee celebration was marked by the laying of the foundation stone of a 250 million Francs CFA multipurpose auditorium, and a fundraising operation during which 36 million Francs CFA was raised.

== List of Principals ==
Name	Period
Fr Thomas Mulligan MHM	1961–1963
Fr Matthew Minto MHM	1963–1964
Fr Martin Van der Werf MHM	1964–1965
Br Vincent Traynor	1965–1969
Br Justin Keady	1969–1970
Br John Philips	1970–1987
Br Nobert Simms (Acting)	1981–82; 1989–1990
Br Joseph McKee	1987–1989; 1990–1993
Mgr Clemens Ndze	1993–2002
Fr John Bosco Ambe	2002 -2007
Fr Michael Seka Kintang	2007–2021
Fr Ernest Timchia Tubuo	2021-date

== Notable alumni ==
In politics and government, some notable alumni of Sacred Heart College include members of government in Cameroon including Felix Mbayu, Paul Tassong, Mingo Paul Ghogomu, Herman Maimo, and Ebot Ogork Ntui. The President of Elections Cameroon (ELECAM) and former Governor Mr. Enow Abrams Egbe is an ex-student. The pioneer President of the Executive Council of the Northwest Region of Cameroon, Professor Fru Angwafor III is a SHESAN. Several members of parliament and diplomats have passed through SAHECO.

In law, the former President of the Bar Council of Cameroon, Bâtonnier Sama Francis, and Retired President of the Court of Appeal of the Northwest Region of Cameroon, Chief Justice Jani Leonard graduated from SAHECO. A former student, Justice Malegho Joseph Aseh, was appointed Secretary General of the Constitutional Council of Cameroon.

In the business world, the award-winning young entrepreneur Nteff Alain, founder of Gifted Mom and winner of the Mastercard Foundation Premier Social Entrepreneur Award, the Anzisha Grand Prize of 2014, and the Queen's Young Leader Award 2016 graduated from SAHECO. In September 2020, Nteff Alain who doubles as the promoter of the Healthlane application announced on his Twitter page that he had successfully raised 1.3 billion francs CFA through a crowdfunding operation Us-based Charity Fundraiser Afowiri Fondzenyuy who participate in marathons to raise funds for charity causes is also an ex-student.

In music, the 2016 All Africa Music Awards Best Male Artist for Central Africa, Wax Dey, and rising Afro rapper Ngoma are ex-students. Motherland Empire Cameroons leading record label was founded by ex-student Dick Chie (Dikalo)
