= Achama =

- Interactive map of Achama
- Coordinates: 5.9523°N 9.7407°E
- Country: Cameroon
- Region: Northwest
- Département: Momo
- Elevation: 1,020 m (3,350 ft)

Population (2005)
  - Total: 834

Achama is a location in Cameroon located in the department of Momo in the Northwest Region. It is part of the commune of Widikum-Boffe and consists of two villages, Lower Achama and Upper Achama.

== Population ==
According to the census of 2005 there are 420 inhabitants in Lower Achama and 414 in Upper Achama.

They speak menka, a Grassfields language.

== See also ==
- Communes of Cameroon

== Annexes ==
=== Bibliography ===
- (in English) Charlene Ayotte and Michael Ayotte, Rapid appraisal and lexicostatistical analysis surveys of Atong, Ambele, and Menka. Widikum-Menka Subdivision. Momo Division. North West Province, SIL International, 2002, 43 p.
- P. Tjeega and Hubert Elingui, Dictionnaire des villages de Momo, Ministère de l'enseignement supérieur et de la recherche scientifique, Centre géographique national, s. l. [Yaoundé], 1987, 48 p.

=== External links ===
- (in English) Widikum, on Communes et villes unies du Cameroun (CVUC)
- (in English) Widikum-Boffe Council Development Plan, PNDP, June 2011, 191 p.
