= Andek =

Coordinates: 5°59′N 9°50′E

Andek Ndek
- Commune and town
- Interactive map of Andek
- Country: Cameroon
- Region: Northwest
- Department: Momo
- Time zone: UTC+1 (WAT)

Andek is a town and commune in Cameroon.

== See also ==
- Communes of Cameroon
- Tinechung
