= Fru Asaah Angwafo IV =

Fon of Mankon

Fru Asaah Ndefru Angwafo IV
- Fon of Mankon
- Reign: 2022–present
- Predecessor: Angwafo III
- Born: Angwafor John Asaah
- Dynasty: Mankon dynasty
- Father: Angwafo III
- Religion: Traditional African religion

Fru Asaah Ndefru Angwafo IV (born as Angwafor John Asaah) is the current Fon (traditional ruler) of Mankon, a major kingdom in Bamenda, in the North-West Region of Cameroon. He became the 21st Fon of Mankon in June 2022 following the traditional "disappearance" of his father, Fon Angwafo III.

== Background ==
Fru Asaah Angwafo IV was born as Angwafor John Asaah. Before ascending the throne, he worked as an educationist, serving as a teacher and later as principal of Government Technical College Nkeung in Bamenda.

He is the son of Fon Angwafo III, who ruled Mankon for 63 years from 1959 until his disappearance in 2022.

== Enthronement ==
In Mankon tradition, a fon is not said to die but to "disappear," symbolizing a spiritual transition. After the disappearance of Angwafo III on 21 May 2022 at age 97, a period of mourning rituals followed.

Customary practices included the suspension of farming activities, prohibition on men wearing caps, and the smearing of ash on bodies. The successor was ritually seized and symbolically pelted with objects before being presented to the public—an act signifying the end of ordinary status and transition into sacred kingship.

He was officially presented to tens of thousands of people on 7 June 2022 at the Mankon palace in Bamenda.

== Reign ==
As Fon, Angwafo IV serves as both the spiritual and political head of the Mankon kingdom, which forms a significant part of the Bamenda metropolitan area.

He has emphasized continuity with his father's legacy, particularly in governance, environmental management, and cultural preservation.

Angwafo IV has also played a role in peace advocacy amid the Anglophone crisis in Cameroon, calling for reconciliation and restoration of authority in the North-West and South-West regions.

In 2024, he received the New Testament translated into the Mankon language, fulfilling an initiative started by his father.

== Cultural role ==
The Fon of Mankon is regarded as the custodian of land, tradition, and spirituality. The institution of the fon represents continuity between ancestors and the living community, and plays a central role in governance and cultural identity.

== See also ==
- Mankon
- Fon Angwafo III
- Bamenda
