= Otong =

Otong may refer to:

== People ==
- J.A "Otong" Verdijantoro, founder of Indonesian band Koil
- Leopold Alphonso Otong (born 1991), Malaysian footballer
- Otong Syatori, birth name of Abdul Halim (nationalist), (1887–1962) Indonesian Islamic scholar and nationalist figure
- Udeme Otong, Nigerian politician

== Other ==
- Otong soup, Nigerian soup
- Otong, name of several peas used for Philippine soup Dinengdeng
- Pokem, Papuan wheat

== See also ==
- Atong (disambiguation)
- Oton
- Otang
