= Atong =

Atong may refer to:

- Atong language (Cameroon), a language of Cameroon
- Atong language (Sino-Tibetan), a language of India and Bangladesh
- Atong Demach, South Sudanese businesswoman and beauty queen
- Atong, Endom, a village in Endom, Nyong-et-Mfoumou, Cameroon
- Atong, Widikum, a village in Widikum, Momo, Cameroon
