= Akumalam =

Quarter in Bamenda, Cameroon

Coordinates: 5°58′26″N 10°05′03″E

Akumalam Akumlam
- Quarter/Village
- Country: Cameroon
- Region: Northwest
- Division: Mezam
- Subdivision: Bamenda II
- Traditional Fondom: Mankon

Population (2005)
  - Total: 502

Akumalam (also spelled Akumlam) is a third-degree traditional quarter of the Mankon fondom located in the Bamenda II Subdivision, Mezam Division, in the Northwest Region of Cameroon.

== Geography and geology ==
Akumalam is situated within the Bamenda Highlands of northwestern Cameroon. The surrounding Mankon area contains deposits of kaolin clay that have been the subject of geological studies.

The kaolin deposits found in the Mankon area are derived from weathered granitic rocks and have been studied for their mineralogical and industrial properties.

== Population ==
According to the 2005 population and housing census conducted by the Bureau Central des Recensements et des Études de Population (BUCREP), Akumalam had a population of 502 inhabitants, including 243 males and 259 females.
