= Tinechung =

Tinechung is one of the nineteen fondoms that make up the Ngie subdivision of the Momo division in Cameroon and speak in Ngoshie language. Its population is 3,000 people. It is one of the developed villages in Ngie though has no high tension power supply. The inhabitants obtain electricity from local generators.
