= R.A.M Tebo II of Batibo =

Regional chieftain or king in Cameroon

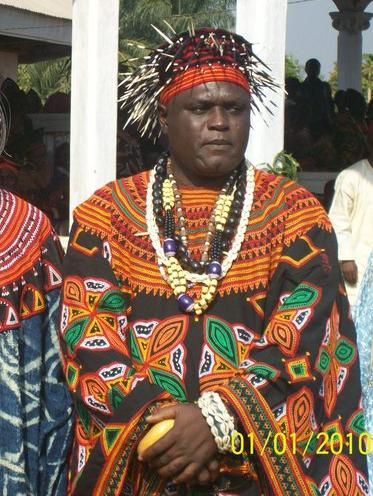
H.R.H. Fon R.A.M Tebo II of Batibo.

Fon R.A.M. Tebo II of Batibo ascended the throne upon the death of his father HRH G.T.T. Mba II in 2005 amidst great political, cultural and economic anxiety in the Batibo Fondom.

== Early life and education ==
Fon R.A.M. Tebo II of Batibo was born into the royal fondom of Batibo village in the North-West Region of the Republic of Cameroon in 1964. His father was Fon GTT Mba 11 (paramount chief of Batibo).

Fon R.A.M. Tebo II's primary education spans from 1970 to 1977. Starting off in Presbyterian primary school Guka, he later transferred to Government Primary School Wumukan where he obtained his F.S.L.C and the following year moved on to pursue his secondary education in C.P.C Bali. After 5 years, he passed the G.C.E 0/L and opted for GHS Mbengwi. Majoring in liberal arts he went on to pass the examination GCE A/L. He then sought and obtained admission to the University of Yaounde where he studied law in the Faculty of Laws and Economics and in 1989 was awarded a bachelor's degree in Law.

=== Business career ===
Subsequent years were spent in job search and business. Starting in Edea where he owned a small business, he retrained in accounting with the British School of accounting, Douala, and then worked for Guinness Cameroon briefly before leaving for an International transportation company that took him off the shores of Cameroon to Dubai. He returned to Cameroon in the declining days of his father's health; he was enthroned in 2005 upon the death of his father.

Though not active in any political party, R.A.M Tebo II is an active member of the Northwest Fons Union (NOWEFU).

== Personal life ==
Fon R.A.M. Tebo II is married to two wives who have both borne him children.

== History of the Batibo Palace ==
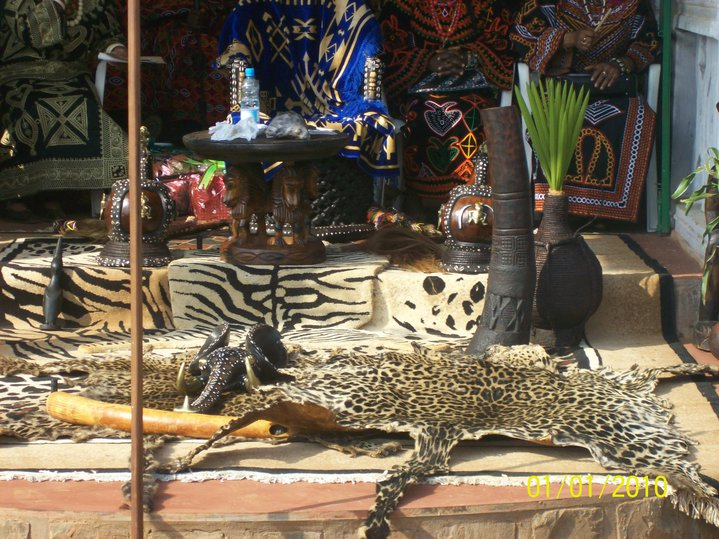
Batibo Palace

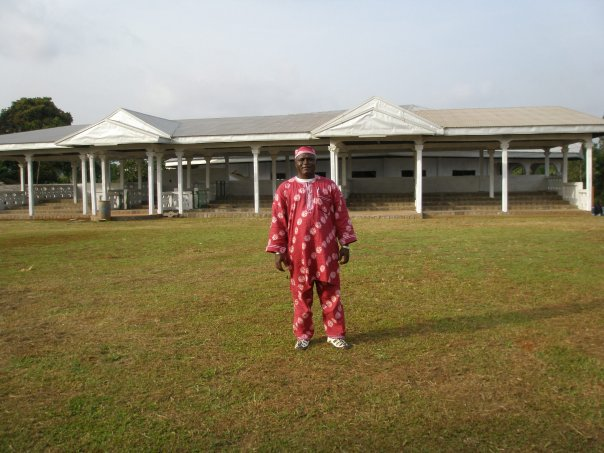
Tebo II in front of the palace

The history of the Batibo Palace and Fondon is intractably linked to that of the entire Widikum tribe in the North Western Region of Cameroon. It dates as far back as to the mid 17th century, when lovebirds Tembeka and Akumaka defected from a wave of Bantu migrants and settled in Tegheben, in a quarter called Tad in today's Batibo, two miles south of the current Batibo palace.

Tegheben is the site of the first palace of the Batibo Fondom. Njei Tegha who succeeded Tembeka evacuated his father's compound and erected his own palace at Gowi quarters, located about a mile north of Tegheben.

Njei Tifuh succeeded Njei Tegha and also decided to vacate his fathers compound at Gowi and moved his palace to the current palace grounds, behind what is now the community hall. Fon Mba II subsequently moved the palace from this location to the present site, still within the palace grounds.

Palace historian Prince Hansel Mba, the eldest son of Fon Mba II writing in a publication "A birds Eye View" published by the Batibo Rural Council, notes that much animosity was often nursed against a named successor, and his life was always threatened by his brothers. Consequently, the successor had to change abode while retaining his father's will making him Fon and successor. This explains some of the movements in the early days of the Fondom, and resolves the lingering questions about Wore Tad and Wore Gowi which has led to conjectures that either a Wore Tad or a Wore Gowi would have formed the royal household for the Batibo Fondom. What is obvious is that while the successor vacated his father's home for safety, one of his brothers always remained and governed the rest of the family as quarter head under the authority of the successor and Fon who lived apart.

R.A.M. Tebo II has engaged on a modernization of the Batibo palace, building new structures and upgrading some old ones.
