= Charlotte Observer Marathon =

Annual marathon in North Carolina, US

The Charlotte Observer Marathon was a significant annual marathon which took place in Charlotte, North Carolina, between the years of 1977 and 2004. The marathon was held as part of a larger event, known as The Charlotte Observer Racefest, which usually also included a 10K race and other sports and fitness events. The race course changed many times over the years, but typically started in front of The Charlotte Observer building on South Tryon Street and headed toward the south of the city through parts of Dilworth, Myers Park, SouthPark, Quail Hollow, and Cotswold. The rolling terrain of Charlotte made the course fairly challenging. MarathonPal.com listed it as one of the top 26 marathons in North America.

== Early history ==
The inaugural race occurred on December 17, 1977, and was won by Lee Fidler in a time of 2:19:04.

There was no race in 1979 due to the event being moved from December to January, which would become its traditional position on the calendar.

The marathon found tremendous popularity in its early years as it was started at the height of the running boom in the United States. It was also one of only a few marathons at the time held on the Mid-Atlantic coast.

In 1984 the marathon offered prize money for the first time, awarding a total purse of $2000. Both the quality and quantity of participants continued to grow through the mid and late 1980s.

== Quality ==
Many national class performances were turned in over the history of the event. Eight women ran sub 2:50 (2 hours, 50 minutes) times, while 39 men went sub 2:20. Each of the first 14 men's champions turned in sub 2:25 times. After 1991 winning times for men showed a slowing trend, with the exception of the 1995 and 1996 championship and trials events.

The women's course record was set in 1991 by Canadian Lisa Presedo in a time of 2:43:53. After 1991 the women still turned in some national class performances (1993 and 1998), but winning times generally followed a similar slowing trend as the men.

== Decline ==
The 1990s saw a drop off in the popularity of the marathon as the running boom cooled and Charlotte faced increasing competition from other marathons in bigger cities and vacation destinations. Additionally, the marathon's reputation for having a challenging course dissuaded many runners who were seeking Boston Marathon qualifying times.

In 1995 and 1996 the marathon was host to the USA Men's National Championships, with the 1996 race also serving as the USA Men's Olympic Trials. Although the events were technically separate from the main marathon, they were held on the same day and the same course, with a slightly earlier starting time. The event record was set during the 1996 Olympic Trials race by Robert Kempainen in a time of 2:12:45.

For 1998, facing a continuing slide in entrants, Racefest events were moved from their usual January date to an April date in an attempt to make the races more spectator friendly. However, this raised the ire of many runners who were concerned warmer springtime temperatures would make the marathon even more difficult.

== Marathon For Peace ==
Citing increasing expenses and declining participation, The Charlotte Observer announced a reevaluation of Racefest events, and canceled the marathon after 1999, opting for a less expensive half marathon event instead. As a result, in January 1999 the inaugural Charlotte Marathon Run for Peace took place, an event unaffiliated with the Charlotte Observer Racefest. The Marathon Run For Peace was an extension of an older December event, the Run For Peace 10 Miler, and used a point-to-point route that started in Davidson, North Carolina, and ended in Charlotte.

For 2002 The Charlotte Observer returned as a title sponsor, joining forces with the Run For Peace. The marathon was run under the banner of the Charlotte Observer Marathon Run For Peace and was held on January 19 of that year. The following year, in 2003, the race was again run as simply The Charlotte Observer Marathon, before being renamed as the Charlotte Observer Run For Peace in 2004. Also in 2004 the race course returned to its more traditional loop configuration of the early years.

== Demise ==
In October 2004 the race's director, Grayson Henry Russell, was charged with mail fraud after it was discovered he was funneling checks written by race participants and sponsors into an unauthorized bank account to which only he had access, a charge to which he later pleaded guilty. As a result, The Charlotte Observer withdrew its financial support for the marathon, effectively ending the annual event. Although there was a 5K and 10K event under the Marathon For Peace name in early 2005, support for a renewed Marathon For Peace could not be found.

Beginning in 2005, The Charlotte Observer Marathon was supplanted by the Thunder Road Marathon, a NASCAR racing themed event which first occurred in December 2005 and was run annually until 2015, after which it was rebranded as the Charlotte Marathon.

== Criticism ==
Although newspaper coverage of the marathon was extensive in the pages of the Charlotte Observer, the paper was frequently criticized over the years for not printing road racing results from other Charlotte area events. Critics charged the paper did not want to promote events other than its own.

However, in the intervening years since the demise of the marathon, the Charlotte Observer continues to regard road racing results as not news worthy and does not report them.
