= Ashong =

Village and chiefdom in Cameroon

- Village and traditional chiefdom
- Country: Cameroon
- Region: Northwest Region
- Division: Momo Division
- Subdivision: Batibo

Government
  - Type: Traditional monarchy
- Elevation: 1,788 m (5,866 ft)

Population (2005)
  - Total: 6,054

Ashong is a village in Cameroon located in the Batibo district, within the Momo division, in the Northwest Region of Cameroon.
It is also the seat of a second-degree traditional chiefdom.

== Geography ==
The village of Ashong is situated at 5° 46′ 38″ N, 9° 57′ 57″ E. It lies about 28 km from Bamenda, the capital of the Northwest Region of Cameroon, and about 237 km from Yaoundé, the political capital of Cameroon.

== Administration ==
Ashong is the seat of a traditional chiefdom headed by a Fon. The chiefdom is recognized within Cameroon's system of traditional authorities and is classified as a second-degree chiefdom, with subordinate third-degree chiefdoms under its jurisdiction.

== Climate ==
Ashong has a savanna climate with a dry winter. The average annual temperature is 26.1 °C, and the annual average rainfall is 1,534.4 mm.

== Population ==
During the 2005 census, Ashong had 6,054 inhabitants, including 2,746 men and 3,308 women.

== See also ==
- Batibo
- Momo Division
- Northwest Region (Cameroon)
- Grassfields (Cameroon)
