= GBHS Mbengwi =

Government Bilingual High School Mbengwi

Location
- Mbengwi; Cameroon

Information
- Former name: Government High School Mbengwi (until 1996)
- School type: Boarding secondary school
- Language: English and French

GBHS (Government Bilingual High School) Mbengwi is the biggest secondary school and high school in Mbengwi, headquarters of Momo Division, Cameroon. It is located in mile 17 and has both boarding and day school sections. Students come from all over Cameroon (and even beyond) to attend GBHS Mbengwi. It was among the first government high schools in Cameroon. Until 1996, GBHS Mbengwi was GHS (Government High School) Mbengwi. The name changed to GBHS in the late 1990s when a French-speaking section was added to the school.

The alumni association is known by its acronym MEXSA (Mbengwi ex-Students' Association).

The Dormitory section of the school opened in the late 1990s.

== Bandit Attack ==
A group of four bandits have allegedly broken into the campus and stolen millions of dollars' worth of goods on November 2, 2012. The principal of the school stated to the media that the school has already been previously broken into 4 times.
