= Widikum =

Widikum Widikum-Boffe
- Commune and town.
- Location in Cameroon
- Coordinates: 5°52′18″N 9°46′14″E
- Country: Cameroon
- Region: North West
- Department: Momo
- District: Widikum-Boffe

Government
  - Type: 3rd Order

Area
  - Total: 169.68 sq mi (439.48 km^{2})

Population
  - Total: 86,822
  - Density: 23/sq mi (8.8/km^{2})
- Time zone: UTC+1 (WAT)
- Köppen climate type: Am : Tropical monsoon climate

Widikum is a town and capital of the Widikum-Boffe Subdivision in Cameroon. Home to the Widikum Tribe, it is located in [Momo division] in Northwest Region (Cameroon) . The town has a population of 28,152 (2005). The town is located at the meeting point of the Momo and Man River.

It is also the homeland of lawyer and activist, Fon Gorji Dinka.

== History ==
During the British Cameroons era , the Widikum subdivision was part of the Mamfé division . It served as an important commercial, religious, and cultural center. The 1961 annexation of Southern Cameroons to the Republic of Cameroon led to the severing of trade and cultural ties with Nigeria , resulting in Widikum's decline. Over time, Widikum was subsequently incorporated into the now-defunct Gwodon division, before becoming part of the Momo division.

In 2019, Ambazonian separatist, General Sebastian, as he was popularly called, was killed during a military raid on his camp in Widikum on the January 5th. Security sources reported that 17 separatist fighters were killed in the course of the raid while several weapons were seized and the camp completely destroyed. However, sources within the separatist movement dispute the figures portrayed by the army and say only ‘General Sebastian’ was killed in the course of the attack as his ‘soldiers’ fell back and took cover.

== Government ==
The villages are ruled by traditional structures under the leadership of the chief or Ofon. The quarter(neighborhood) is governed by a quarter-head and all family heads, while the village is ruled by the village council.

== People ==
The district is made up of four clans: Ambelle, Bussam, Menka and Widikum (Ambumekum). Emigration to the South-West region is significant due to the low number of jobs, lack of infrastructure and geographical difficulties. Polygamy is widely practiced, particularly due to the need for a large workforce for agricultural work. It is therefore common to have 3 wives per household, potentially leading to nearly 25 children in the largest households.

90% of the working population are farmers, with a marked predominance of crop production ( palm oil , Arabica and Robusta coffee, coca, maize, cassava, peanuts, etc.). There are only 33 livestock farmers and 3 fish farmers. Research is being conducted locally to improve palm cultivation through 6 specialized agricultural nurseries. Production is mainly intended for family and local consumption, primarily due to a lack of transport infrastructure, storage facilities, and markets. Palm oil is the main product sold outside the commune for further processing. Two oil presses exist in the commune but are unusable due to the poor condition of the roads. Despite the presence of numerous forests, there is no logging except for domestic use or local construction.

Stones and sand from local rivers are extracted for construction, both by the inhabitants and by the China Road and Bridge Corporation (CRBC) building the international road linking Batibo to Ekok . This extraction is controlled by both the State and the municipality.

Several Christian churches are present: Catholic (the most numerous in terms of places of worship and believers), Presbyterian , Full Gospel , Apostolic and New Apostolic Church , Evangelical Church , Jehovah's Witnesses and Church of Christ.

Some followers of traditional African religions are also present, along with sorcerers of the Aperie, Atomteng, Etuti, and Takum traditions. Some clans have tombs that are venerated by some as being able to ensure good harvests and protect people from the evil eye.

Muslims are few in number with only one place of worship in Menka.

== Sources ==
- Ngwa, Divine Fuhnwi (3 October 2017). "Cameroon: Fonship and Power Politics in State Formation in Bafut" (PDF). Conflict Studies Quarterly. 21 (21): 50–75. doi:10.24193/csq.21.3.
