= Chomba =

- Location in Cameroon
- Coordinates: 5°55′N 10°12′E
- Country: Cameroon
- Province: Northwest Province

Chomba is a village under the Bamenda municipality in Cameroon. The village is located six kilometers outside of Bamenda town. Before the 1960s, no motorable road linked the village to Bamenda town. The main road that links the village to the town was constructed manually by the villagers themselves. It was until the late 1970s/early 1980s that motor vehicles could reach the village. Today, the village is linked to the Bamenda town, by a half-paved/half-unpaved road.

The village is noted for its hilly landscape and rocky terrain. Development in the village is actually slowed by the hilly and rocky terrain. Vehicles have never reached certain parts of the village due to this hilly nature. The hills are so steep that climbing is very difficult on some slopes.

The population of the village is made of two groups of people: the indigents who are part of the Ngemba tribe, and the Fulani who are migrant settlers. The village survives mainly on subsistence agriculture. The main food crops are cassava, cocoyam, potato, corn, beans, and plantains. Achu is the staple food and a delicacy. The Fulani are cattle rearers and live on the rocky hills. The grass that grows on these hills is very good for cattle, and the hills are burned every dry season so that fresh grass can grow when the rains return. This fresh grass can support the cattle throughout the year.

The people of Chomba are united by their culture and by their fon (chief). There is religious freedom, but all the villagers recognise their traditional religion. By this the villagers believe in reaching God through their ancestors. Most households have family shrines through which the spirits of the ancestors can be consulted. The shrine is consulted when settling family disputes. However, the entire village is united under the village shrine which is the highest in the village. This is consulted annually under the leadership of the fon. Rituals are performed at the village shrine before each farming season to ensure a good harvest. The shrine is also consulted before any important ceremony can take place in the village, such as the fon's annual dance called Lereh.

Development in the village is carried out by the village development association, CHODECA. CHODECA has an annual meeting every April, during which sons and daughters of the village raise money for the development of the village. Through CHODECA, the village enjoys rural road maintenance and pipe-born water.
