= Widikum people =

Cameroonian ethnic group

Regions with significant populations
- Northwest Region (Cameroon)

Languages
- Meta’ language

The Widikum people are an ethnic group of Cameroon and are one of the largest ethnic groups of the North-West Region of Cameroon.

== Origins ==
According to oral tradition, the Widikum people originated from an area near the villages of Bamben and Numben in the Northwest region of Cameroon. Egun Oyimi is said to be the ancestral home of the Widikum-speaking people found in Momo division, parts of Mezam, Lebialem, Manyu, Menchum, Menoua, and Bamboutus divisions.

== Language ==
The Widikum people mainly speak the Meta’ language, which is broken up into two main dialects: Menemo (Mbengwi), and Moghamo (Batibo), These dialects have slight differences, but generally sound the same and are mutually intelligible.

== Culture ==
The Widikum culture includes traditional clothing, dances, and cuisines.

Widikums, along with most of the North West Region, wear what is commonly called “Bamenda Dress/Clothes.” However, each tribe has a particular design and pattern belonging to them.

Widikums have over a dozen traditional dances, which include the Kwem Sword dance, Tewara dance, Mukonge dance, and one of the most popular, the Chibi dance. Each of the dances has their own meanings and may be dances at different occasions. For example, one certain dance could be performed at a funeral, while another could be performed at a wedding.

== Demographics ==
Widikum people are primarily found in the Momo Department (Division) of the North West Region of Cameroon. Momo is then made up of 5 LGAs which are:

- Batibo
- Mbengwi
- Ngie
- Widikum
- Njikwa

Momo is populated with over 250,000+ inhabitants.

== Sources ==
- Ngwa, Divine Fuhnwi (3 October 2017). "Cameroon: Fonship and Power Politics in State Formation in Bafut" (PDF). Conflict Studies Quarterly. 21 (21): 50–75. doi:10.24193/csq.21.3.
- Monteh, René Ngek; Tati, Rachel Nyongkah (2019). "The role of Bali Chamba Women in Inter-Ethnic Conflicts: A pre-colonial to post-colonial situation". Syllabus Review. 8 (3): 25–57.
- "Regions of Cameroon". Statoids.com.
- "Brief History". Widikum.info. 2011.
- Layton, R. (2012). Who Needs the Past?: Indigenous Values and Archaeology. Routledge. pp. 167–169. ISBN 978-1-135-09063-0.
