= Fon (title) =

Regional chieftain or king in Cameroon

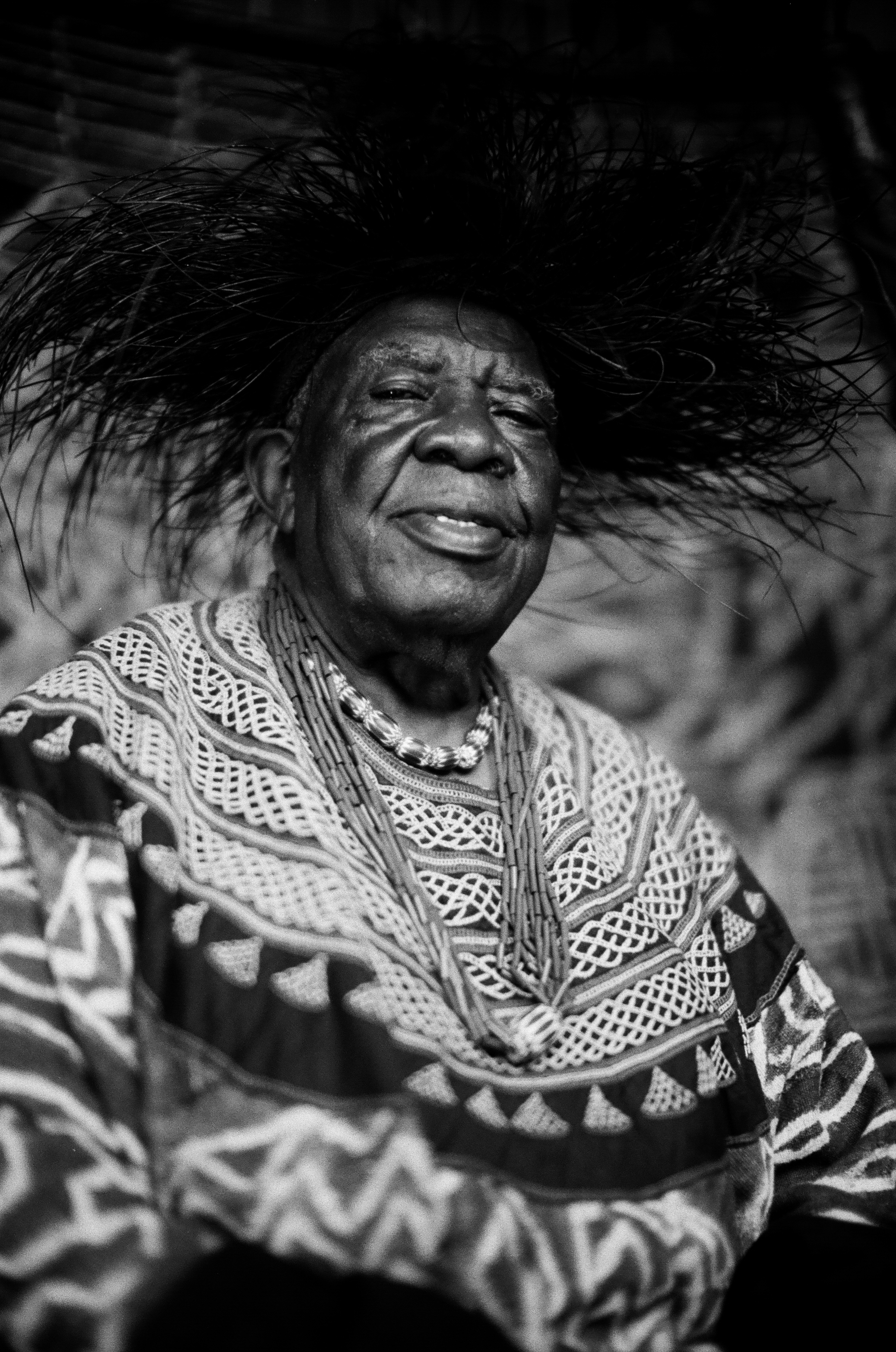
Fon Angwafo III of Mankon, photographed in 2012

A Fon is a chieftain or king of a region of Cameroon, especially among the Ngie, Widikum, Tikar, and Bamiléké peoples of the Grassfields (the Northwest and West Regions) and the Lebialem of the South West Region. Following the defeat of Germany in World War I, the Fons of British Cameroon came under British rule, and the Fons of French Cameroon came under French rule. Since Cameroon's independence in 1961, the Fons are under the jurisdiction of the Government of Cameroon. However, they maintain semi-autonomous union councils and jurisdiction over their hereditary land.

Some of the historically significant Fons of the Northwest are:

- Abe Abe. (Fon of Upper Zetzet)
- Doh Gahnyonga II (Fon of Bali Nyonga)
- Fon Angwafo III of Mankon
- Fon Asanji II of Chomba
- Fon of Anong-Timah Bamtie
- Fon of Ashong
- Fon of Awing
- Fon of Kung HRM. Fon KUM Gilbert
- Fon of Bali-Gansin
- Fon of Bali-Gashu
- Fon of Bali-Gham
- Fon of Bangwa
- Fon of Batibo
- Fon of Bessi
- Fon of Bum
- Fon of Mbessa. HRM Fon Njong III
- Fon of Zang Tabi
- Fon of Guzang
- Fon of Mendankwe
- Fon of Bafut
- Fon of Nso
- Fon of Ewai. HRM Johnson Tekock Ajeck
- Fon of Bafanji
- Fon of Oku. HRM Fon Ngum IV

In the Southwest region, only Lebialem division has Fons, the most notable of them being The Fon of Fontem.

- Nchong Valentine, Fon of Folepi
- Asabaton Fontem, Fon of Fontem
- Lekunze, Fon of Bamumbu
- Fotabong Achenjang, Fon of Lewoh
- Atieboh Robert, Fon of Besali
- Fonjumetaw, Fon of Nwehbetaw
- Nicasius Nguazong, Fon of Fossungu Nguazong

== List of incumbents ==
This table provides a list of current Fons in Cameroon.

Index	Fondom	Incumbent	Tenure
1	The Fon of Akum	Fon Ngwashi Ndikum George	Since 1958
2	The Fon of Ambo	Fon Tegum A. M	
4	The Fon of Anong	Fon Timah Moses Awenjang II	
5	The Fon of Ashong	Fon Christopher Mbah Mbafor III	Since 2000 (order no. 0156/6/MINAT of 14 July)
6	The Fon of Awing	Fon Fozoh II	Since 1998
7	The Fon of Baba II		
8	The Fon of Babanki		
9	The Fon of Bamum		
10	The Fon of Bacham		
11	The Fon of Bali-Nyonga	Fon Doh Gahyonga	
12	The Fon of Bali-Kumbat	Fon Doh Gahnyami III	Since 2006
13	The Fon of Batibo	Fon Tebo II R.A.M.	Since 2006
14	The Fon of Bafanji		
15	The Fon of Bafut	Fon Abumbi II	Since 1968
16	The Fon of Bambalang.	Fon Fosi Yakum Ntaw	
17	The Fon Babungo	Fon Ndofoa Zofoa III	Since 1999
18	The Fon of Bamesing	Fon Muntong Richard III	Since 6 April, 1994
19	The Fon of Bangolan	Fon Chafah XI	
20	The Fon of Bawock	Nana Wanda III	
21	The Fon of Bessi	Fon Forkum Richardson	
22	The Fon of Bessom		
23	The Fon of Befang		
24	The Fon of Bellah	Charles Morfaw	Since 1991
25	The Fon of Chomba	Fon Forbuzie II Martin Asanji	Since 1963
26	The Fon of Dschang	Fon Ralph Mehitang Teuma	
27	The Fon of Eewen		
28	The Fon of Enyoh		
29	The Fon of Esu	Fon Kum-a-Chuo II Albert Chi Kawzuh	Since 2007 murdered on March 9, 2022
30	The Fon of Ewai	HRM J.T Ajeck	Since 1964
31	The Fon of Fontem	Asabaton Fontem	
32	The Fon of Fossungu Nguazong	Fon Nicasius Nguazong	
33	The Fon of Guzang	Fon Gwan Mbanyamsig III Charles	
34	The Fon of Kedjom Keku	Fon Vubansi	
35	The Fon of Kom	Fon Vincent Yuh II	
36	The Fon of Kung	Fon Ekia Gilbert KUM	
37	The Fon of Kulabei		
38	The Fon of Kuruku		
39	The Fon of Mankon	Fru Asaah Angwafo IV	Since 7 June 2022
40	The Fon of Mbantu		
41	The Fon of Mbe		
42	The Fon of Mbengkok		
44	The Fon of Menka	Fon Moses Tadoh Azah	
45	The Fon of Mbengwi	Fon Thaddeus Njokum	
46	The Fon of Nkambe		
47	The Fon of Mbessa (Mbesa)	Fon Gilbert Njong III	Since 1988
48	The Fon of Nkeh	Fuankeh Ekokobe	
49	The Fon of Nkar		
50	The Fon of Ngyen muwah	Fon Teche Nje II	
51	The Fon of Nkwen	Fon F.S.N Azehfor III	
52	The Fon of Nso	Fon Sehm Mbinglo I	
53	The Fon of Nsongwa	Fon Fo'Ngwadé Nzaah III	
54	The Fon of Pinyin		
55	The Fon of Oku	Fon Ngum Merlin IV	Since 12th May, 2021
56	The Fon of Teze-Ngie	Fon Ateughap Justin IV	
58	The Fon of Zang Tabi	Fon J.A. Tabi	
