= Ephraim Fombi =

Cameroonian politician

Personal details
- Born: 1947

Ephraim Fombi (born 1947) is a Cameroonian politician who served as a parliamentarian in the National Assembly from 1992 to 1997. He is a member of the CPDM party.

Ephraim Fombi was born in Mbengwi, in the Northwest Region. He was a technician by profession. He opened his first shop in Bamenda. He later opened Momo Technical College in Mbengwi and then moved there. While in Mbengwi, he opened the biggest bookshop. He was elected to the National Assembly in 1992, where he served until 1997 under the platform of the CPDM party. In 1992, because of allegations of fraud by the ruling party in the presidential elections, all his property was burned down, including the school, which had a population of about 700 students.

Ephraim Fombi is currently the director of CAMECO, which is a contracting firm that executes government contracts. He is married to Roseline Fombi, and together, they have seven children.
