= Momo (department) =

- Department
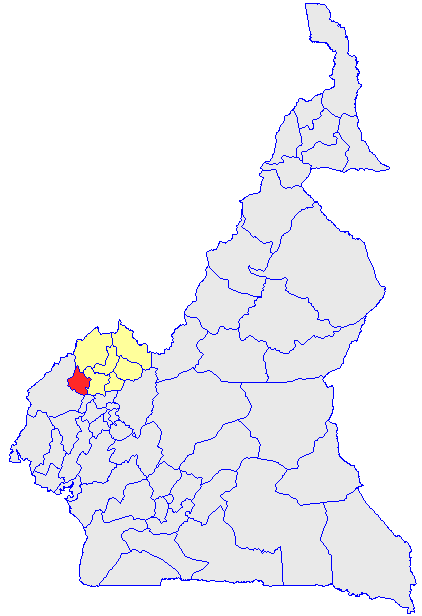
- Department location in Cameroon
- Country: Cameroon
- Province: Northwest Province
- Capital: Mbengwi

Area
  - Total: 692 sq mi (1,792 km^{2})

Population (2005)
  - Total: 138,693
- Time zone: UTC+1 (WAT)

Momo is a department of Northwest Province in Cameroon. The department covers an area of 1792 km^{2} and as of 2005 had a total population of 138,693. It is the ethnic home of the Widikum People. The capital of the department lies at Mbengwi.

== Subdivisions ==
The department is divided administratively into 5 District and in turn into villages. yes

=== Communes ===
- Andek
- Batibo
- Mbengwi
- Njikwa
- Ambumekum
