= Fon Angwafo III of Mankon =

Cameroonian traditional ruler (1925–2022)

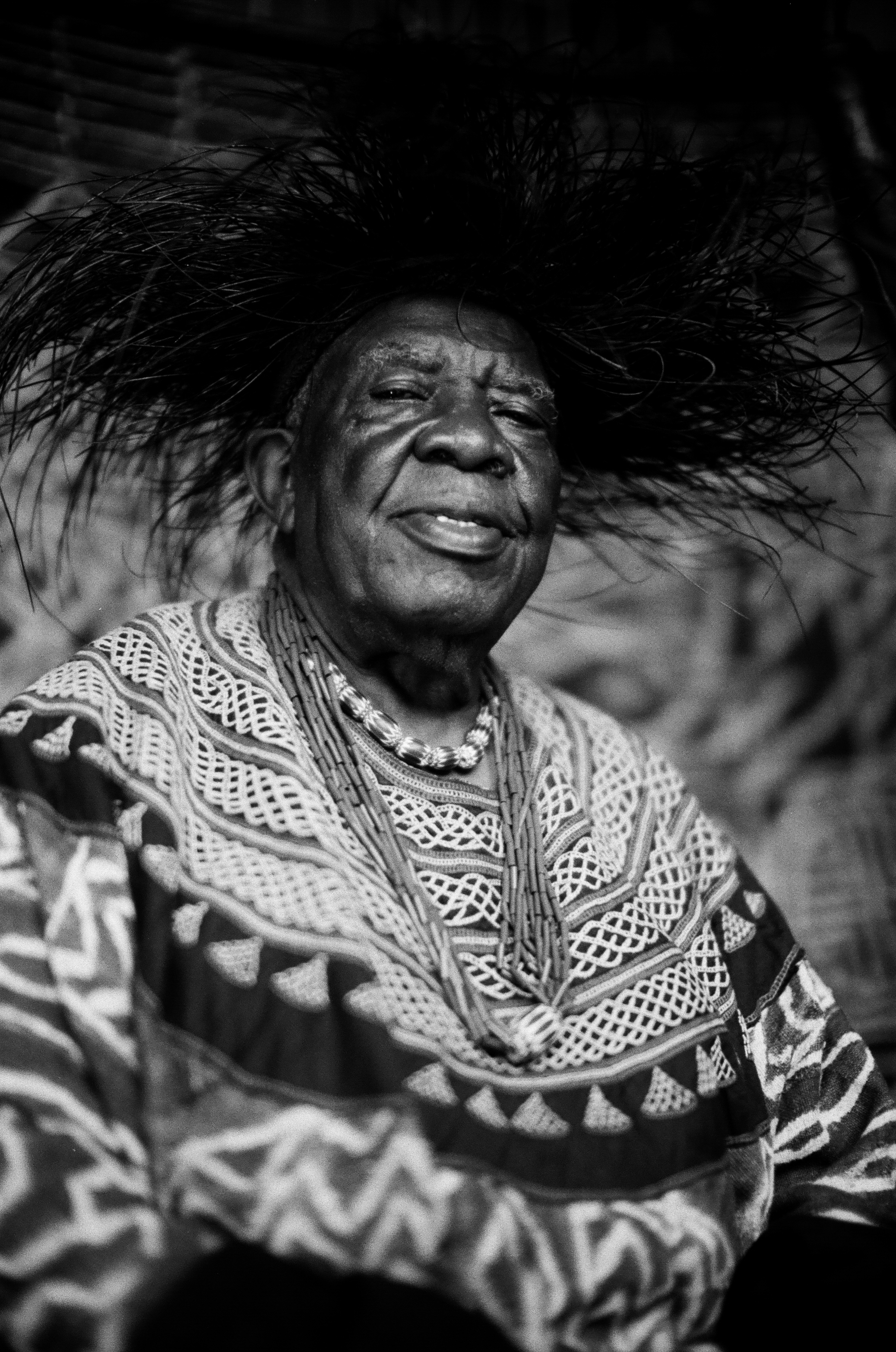
Fon Angwafo III of Mankon in 2012

Fon Angwafo III of Mankon (1 May 1925 – 21 May 2022) was a Cameroonian traditional ruler.

== Life ==
Fon Angwafo III was born in Mankon, on 1 May 1925.

He attended the Aggrey Memorial College Arochuku, in eastern Nigeria, from 1945 to 1950. He later studied at the University College Ibadan, Nigeria, from which he graduated in 1953 with a Diploma in Agriculture. He became the twentieth Fon of Mankon in 1959.

=== Political life ===
Fon Angwafo III was a member of the Parliament of Cameroon from 1962 to 1988. He also served as the first vice chair of the Cameroon People's Democratic Movement.

He died on 21 May 2022, at the age of 97. The announcement by the Governor of the Northwest Region, Adolphe Lele, was met with controversy among the Mankon people as it did not follow their traditional taboo regarding a Fon's death, which is described instead as "going missing".

His son Fru Asaah Angwafo IV succeeded him on 7 June 2022.

== Works ==
- Royalty and Politics. The Story of My Life (2009)
