= Maratón Medellin =

Annual marathon event

The Medellín Marathon
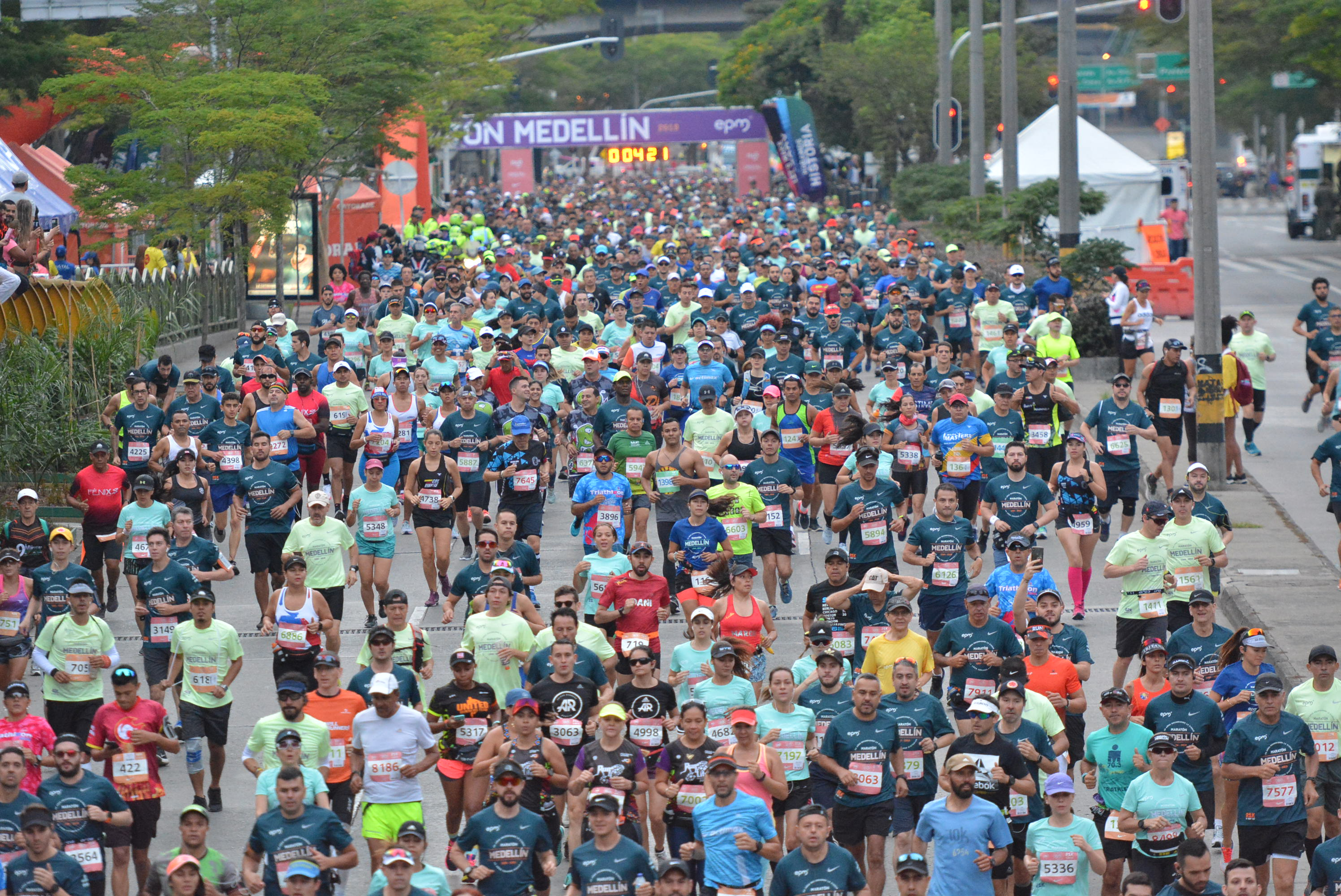
- Image of the start of the 2019 Medellín Marathon
- Date: September
- Location: Medellín, Colombia
- Event type: Road
- Distance: Marathon (also 10 km, 42 km, 5 km, 21 km)
- Primary sponsor: Lazza Capital; Telemedellín; GARMIN; Mayor of Medellín
- Established: 1995 (31 years ago)
- Organizer: MCM Event Operator
- Website: Medellin Marathon

Maratón Medellín (or Medellín Marathon in English, previously the Medellín Flowers Marathon, or initially called the Medellín International Half Marathon) is an annual marathon held in Medellín, Colombia. It is the oldest marathon event in Colombia, celebrated every September, attracting both local and international participants.

The race includes a variety of distances to accommodate runners of different skill levels, with a full marathon, a half-marathon, a 10 kilometres (6.2 mi) race, and a 5 kilometres (3.1 mi) race. Maratón Medellín has become one of Latin America's well-known road races. It is the only 42 km street race in Colombia recognized by the International Association of Athletics Federations (IAAF).

The 30th edition was held on September 1 2024, with sponsorship from Telemedellín.

== History ==
The Medellín Marathon is an annual race held in Medellín, Colombia. As the first marathon-distance road race in Colombia and one of the most established in Latin America, The Marathon was established in 1995 with 2,000 runners from five nations completing a 14-kilometre course. The following year, the event became the Medellín International Half Marathon, attracting approximately 4,000 athletes. Subsequently, participation steadily increased, and the race achieved international recognition through certification by the International Association of Athletics Federations (IAAF) and status as a qualifying race for the Boston Marathon.

During the late 1990s and 2000s, the event grew in size and organization, establishing itself as one of the principal road races in Colombia.

The Marathon marked a milestone in 2012 with the introduction of the full marathon distance (42.195 km), transforming it into a significant international event. Participation exceeded 13,000 annually, reaching over 15,000 athletes from more than 40 nations in 2018.

The 2023 edition included revised routes through central Medellín.

=== Race Course ===
The marathon course offers a tour through the Medellin Flower Marathon, an annual marathon event in Medellin, Colombia, and part of the International Association of Marathons and Distance Running (AIMS).

One course of this marathon event is the incorporation of social causes within its yearly agenda. In 2017, AIMS conferred the Social Award to this race as part of the Best Marathon Runner event in Athens, Greece. This award goes to events that contribute towards the achievement of the goals set by the United Nations. In 2017, some of the social programs supported by the marathon include United for Colombia (UFC), which promotes rehabilitation for those affected by landmines; a breast cancer awareness campaign in conjunction with Avon and Fundayama; and Pasos de Felicidad, which aims to provide funds to underprivileged people through a youth movement.

== Past marathons ==
=== 2018 ===
The 24th edition of the Medellín Marathon was held on 16 September, drawing approximately 15,000 athletes from nearly 40 countries across four distances: 42 km, 21 km, 10 km, and 5 km. The course followed the route adopted in 2016, certified by the IAAF and authorized by the mobility authorities of Medellín, Envigado, and Sabaneta. In the men's marathon, Ethiopian athlete Habtamu Arega took first place with a time of 2:18:18, followed by Kenya's Ronald Korir in 2:18:44 and Elias Kemboi in 2:19:24. In the women's race, Ethiopia's Tigist Teshome won in 2:39:04, with Kenya's Carolyne Kiptoo finishing second in 2:39:59 and Colombia's Sandra Rosas third in 2:41:32.

=== 2019 ===
The 25th edition of the Medellín Marathon was held on 8 September 2019, Across four distances: 42 km, 21 km, 10 km, and 5 km. In the men's 21 km, Joseph Kiprono Kiptum claimed victory in 1:04:50, with Titus Kipjumba Mbishei finishing second in 1:06:07, and René Champi third in 1:07:36.

=== 2022 ===
The 28th edition was held on 3 September 2022, marking the event's return to in-person competition following the COVID-19 pandemic. In the men's 42 km, Colombian athlete Jeisson Suárez finished first with a time of 2:15:53, setting a new course record and becoming the first Colombian winner in the distance since 2014. Franklin Téllez, also of Colombia, placed second in 2:19:42, followed by Kenya's Samuel Yeko in 2:20:47. In the women's race, Kenya's Hellen Nzembi Musyoka won in 2:41:51, with Colombian runners Ana Milena Orjuela and Ruby Riátiva finishing second and third respectively.

=== 2023 ===
The 2023 Medellín Marathon was held on September 3, 2023, and featured four race distances: 42 kilometers, 21 kilometers, 10 kilometers, and 5 kilometers. In the half-marathon, Joseph Kiprono Kiptum emerged as the men's champion at 1:05:06, while Jhoselyn Yessica Camargo Aliaga claimed the women's title, finishing in 1:14:14. In the full marathon, which spans 42 kilometers, Jeisson Suárez won the men's division with a time of 2:17:24. Caroline Chepkurui Tuigong won the women's division, finishing in 2:39:25.

=== 2024 ===
The 2024 Medellín Marathon was held on Sunday, September 1, as part of the celebration marking its 30th anniversary. More than 24,000 athletes from 42 countries across five continents participated in the event. In the men's 42K race, Peruvian runner Walter Nina claimed first place, while Kenya's Naomi Jepkogei won the women's division. In the 21K race, Colombian Mauricio González at 1:04:10 emerged victorious in the men's category, with Ecuadorian Mary Granja at a time of 1:14:00 winning the women's race.

=== 2025 ===
The 31st edition was held on 7 September 2025, with more than 27,000 runners from 45 countries in attendance. In the men's 42 km, Colombian David Gómez González won in 2:16:21, edging Kenya's Titus Kipjumba Mbishei by seconds, with Sergio López Rodríguez third in 2:19:18. Dina Velásquez Rojas took the women's title in 2:36:21. In the 21 km, Joseph Kiprono Kiptum won in 1:04:11, with Ecuador's Carmen Toaquiza Isa claiming the women's honours in 1:15:01.

== Incidents ==
On September 16, 2018, Kenyan long-distance runner Joseph Kiprono Kiptum was struck by a car while leading the Medellín Half Marathon in Colombia. Kiptum, who was on pace to win the race, was hit as he ran along a section of the course that had reportedly been improperly secured. The incident occurred when a car unexpectedly entered the marathon route, leading to a collision that left him injured. Following the accident, Kiptum received medical attention and was transported to a nearby hospital. Although he sustained injuries, they were not life-threatening, and he was treated for cuts and bruises.

On September 3, 2022, a 35-year-old man collapsed while participating in the marathon near Calle San Juan and Avenida del Ferrocarril. He was transported to the General Hospital of Medellín, where he was later pronounced dead.

== Categories and events ==
The Maratón Medellín comprises several race categories, catering to diverse age groups and abilities:

- 42.195 kilometres (26.219 mi) (Marathon): The main event, open to professional and amateur runners, and recognized by the Asociación Internacional de Maratones y Carreras de Distancia (AIMS).
- 21.0975 kilometres (13.1094 mi) (Half Marathon): A popular choice for competitive and recreational runners.
- 10 kilometres (6.2 mi) Race: Designed for both runners and walkers, this category allows broader community participation.
- 5 kilometres (3.1 mi) Recreational Run: A non-competitive race that encourages participation from families, beginners, and those looking to enjoy the event without focusing on competitive timing.

=== Marathon, General Category ===
Winners and times recorded in 42 km in the different editions of the event.

Referencias:

Best mark of the race
Virtual due to COVID 19 pandemic

Edition	Date	Male winner	Time (h:m:s)	Female winner	Time (h:m:s)
29ª	September 3, 2023	(Colombia) Jeisson Alexander Suárez Bocanegra	2:17:24	(Kenya) Caroline Chepkurui Tuigong	2:39:25
28ª	September 4, 2022	(Colombia) Jeisson Alexander Suárez Bocanegra	2:15:58	(Kenya) Hellen Nzembi Musyoka	2:41:51
27ª	2021	Virtual due to COVID 19 pandemic	Virtual due to COVID 19 pandemic	Virtual due to COVID 19 pandemic	Virtual due to COVID 19 pandemic
26ª	2020	Virtual due to COVID 19 pandemic	Virtual due to COVID 19 pandemic	Virtual due to COVID 19 pandemic	Virtual due to COVID 19 pandemic
25ª	September 8, 2019	(Kenya) Timothy Kipngetich Kemboi	2:24:51	(Ethiopia) Ayelu Abebe Hordorfa	2:48:41
24ª	2018	(Ethiopia) Habtamu Arega Wegi	2:18:18	(Ethiopia) Tigist Teshome Ayunu	2:39:04
23ª	2017	(Kenya) Mike Kiptum	2:21:34	(Kenya) Carolyne Chemutai	2:49:43
22ª	2016	(Kenya) Amos Kiprotich	2:17:52	(Kenya) Carolyne Chemutai	2:37:32
21ª	2015	(Kenya) Cosmas Mutuku Kjera	2:18:11	(Kenya) Mercy Jelimo Too	2:42:40
20ª	2014	(Colombia) Juan Carlos Cardona	2:20:25	(Peru) Karina Villazana	2:45:19
19ª	2013	(Colombia) Juan Carlos Cardona	2:21:15	(Colombia) Leidy Tobón	2:51:27
18ª	2012	(Colombia) José David Cardona	2:24:18	(Colombia) Leidy Tobón	2:57:31

=== Marathon, General Category ===
Winners and times recorded in 21 km in the different editions of the event.

Referencias:

Best mark of the race
Virtual edition due to COVID 19 pandemic

Edition	Date	Male winner	Time (h:m:s)	Female winner	Time (h:m:s)
30ª	September 1, 2023	(Colombia) Mauricio González	1:04:10	(Ecuador) Mary Zeneida Granja	1:14:00
29ª	September 3, 2023	(Kenya) Joseph Kiprono Kiptum	1:05:06	(Bolivia) Jhoselyn Yessica Camargo Aliaga	1:14:14
28ª	September 4, 2022	(Bolivia) Vidal Basco Mamani	1:04:23	(Colombia) Angie Rocio Orjuela Soche	1:15:47
27ª	2021	Virtual due to COVID 19 pandemic	Virtual due to COVID 19 pandemic	Virtual due to COVID 19 pandemic	Virtual due to COVID 19 pandemic
26ª	2020	Virtual due to COVID 19 pandemic	Virtual due to COVID 19 pandemic	Virtual due to COVID 19 pandemic	Virtual due to COVID 19 pandemic
25ª	September 8, 2019	(Kenya) Joseph Kiprono Kiptum	1:04:50	(Ethiopia) Tigist Teshome Ayunu	1:15:05
24ª	2018	(Ethiopia) Daniel Muindi Muteti	1:03:45	(Ethiopia) Yeshi Chekole	1:11:23
23ª	2017	(Kenya) Titus Kipjumba Mbishei	1:04:33	(Ecuador) Diana Landi	1:13:59
22ª	2016	(Kenya) David Kiprotich Langat	1:06:04	(Kenya) Ogla Jerono	1:14:19
21ª	2015	(Kenya) Joseph Kiprono Kiptum	1:05:52	(Morocco) Malika Asahssah	1:14:40
20ª	2014	(Kenya) Benjamin Kiplimo Mutai	1:04:28	(Peru) Santa Inés Melchor	1:13:21
19ª	2013	(Kenya) Edwin Kipsang Rotich	1:04:21	(Peru) Santa Inés Melchor	1:13:25
18ª	2012	(Colombia) Diego Colorado	1:04:04	(Colombia) Carolina Tabares	1:17:08
17ª	2011	(Kenya) Julius Kipyego Keter	1:03:21	(Colombia) Erika Abril	1:14:41
16ª	2010	(Ethiopia) Reta Alene Amare	1:03:34	(Kenya) Genoveva Jelagat Kigen	1:12:55
15ª	2009	(Kenya) Julius Kipyego Keter	1:03:20	(Kenya) Ogla Jerono Kimaiyo	1:13:29
14ª	2008	(Kenya) Julius Kipyego Keter	1:02:34	(Kenya) Ogla Jerono Kimaiyo	1:13:56
13ª	2007	(Kenya) Kimutai Kiplimo	1:05:52	(Kenya) Ogla Jerono Kimaiyo	1:15:39
12ª	2006	(Kenya) Ernest Meli Kimeli	1:04:32	(Kenya) Genoveva Jelagat Kigen	1:14:35
11ª	2005	(Brazil) Rómulo Wagner Da Silva	1:04:18	(Colombia) Bertha Sánchez	1:17:08
10ª	2004	(Brazil) Marilson Gomes Dos Santos	1:03:58	(Colombia) Iglandini González	1:17:16
9ª	2003	(Australia) Sisay Bezabeth	1:04:42	(Russia) Lyudmila Korchagina	1:15:07
8ª	2002	(Kenya) Benedic Kimondiu	1:03:22	(Kenya) Teresa Wanjiku	1:11:42
7ª	2001	(Angola) Joao Ntyamba	1:04:34	(Peru) María Portilla	1:15:02
6ª	2000	(Ecuador) Silvio Guerra	1:03:13	(Russia) Ramilya Burangulova	1:14:15
5ª	1999	(Peru) José Castillo	1:02:55	(Russia) Lidia Grigorieva	1:11:39
4ª	1998	(Peru) José Castillo	1:03:39	(Kenya) Delillah Adiago	1:12:51
3º	1997	(Colombia) Juan Carlos Gutiérrez	1:02:53	(Kenya) Salina Chirchir	1:14:54
2º	1996	(Colombia) Herder Vásquez	1:03:26	(Colombia) Stella Castro	1:14:26
1º	1995	1/3 marathon	-	1/3 marathon	-

==== Multiple wins ====
Men's
Athlete	Wins	Years
Julius Kipyego Keter (KEN)	3	2008, 2009, 2011
Joseph Kiptum (KEN)	3	2015, 2019, 2023

Women's
Athlete	Wins	Years
Ogla Jerono Kimaiyo (KEN)	4	2007, 2008, 2009, 2016
Genoveva Jelagat Kigen (KEN)	2	2006, 2010
Inés Melchor (CAN)	2	2013, 2014

== Organization, sponsors, institutional support and endorsements ==
=== Organization ===
Since 1995, the race has been organized by MCM Operador de Eventos, an entity created from the initiative of Camacol Antioquia and the Antioquia Athletics League.

=== Sponsors ===
In 2019, the main sponsors, support entities and guarantees were:

Great Sponsor

- Empresas Públicas de Medellín

Institutional Support

- Medellín Mayor's Office
- Inder Medellin

==== Other sponsors ====
- Nike
- Gatorade
- Tigo
- Agua Cristal
- El Colombiano

=== Endorsements ===
- World Athletics
- Association of International Marathons and Distance Races
- Antioquia Athletics League
- ALCAR, Latin American Road Racing Association
