= Charlotte Marathon =

Annual marathon in North Carolina, US

- The Novant Health Charlotte Marathon Logo
- Date: November
- Location: Charlotte, North Carolina, United States
- Event type: Road
- Distance: Marathon
- Established: 2005
- Course records: Men's: 02:23:50 (2021) Adam Jones Women's: 02:45:04 (2007) Megan Hepp
- Website: www.runcharlotte.com

The Novant Health Charlotte Marathon is an annual marathon which takes place in Charlotte, North Carolina, every November. It was previously called Thunder Road Marathon and used to feature a NASCAR theme in keeping with the region's close ties to auto racing.

The event was started in 2005 after the Charlotte Observer Marathon came to an end. The race course, a loop which begins and ends in Uptown Charlotte, is certified and is a Boston Marathon qualifier.

In 2010 due to the increasing popularity of marathon events nationwide, it was announced that entries would be capped at 3500, although the actual number of entrants has never reached that level. The event was renamed the Novant Health Charlotte Marathon in February 2016.

== Races ==
The Charlotte Marathon consists of 3 different races with the headline event being the marathon. However the largest number of participants are in the half marathon, which is run on the first half of the full marathon course.

== Record ==
Marathon Record
Men's Marathon Record			Women's Marathon Record	
Year	Name (Number of victories)	Time	Name (Number of victories)	Time
2005	Robert Marchinko	2:31:42	Maureen Larsen	3:08:34
2006	Birhanu Wukaw	2:24:20	Barbie Dalton	3:13:34
2007	Mike Aldrink	2:39:56	Megan Hepp	2:45:04
2008	Robert Miller	2:40:50	Rebecca Massie	3:07:46
2009	Jordan Kinley	2:29:39	Mo Campbell	3:04:23
2010	Jordan Kinley (2)	2:24:46	Danielle Walther Crockford	2:59:43
2011	Kyle O Smith	2:37:21	Caroline Orlando	3:04:58
2012	Hugh Parker	2:33:51	Yu Tsuchida	3:01:42
2013	Bert Rodriguez	2:33:37	Alice Rogers	2:56:12
2014	Masashi Shirotake	2:31:07	Megan Hovis (2)	2:56:40
2015	Masashi Shirotake (2)	2:27:57	Lucy Rogers	3:10:11
2016	Chad Crockford	2:37:19	Lucy Rogers (2)	2:59:33
2017	Bert Rodriguez (2)	2:26:33	Jenna Baker	3:00:48
2018	James Perez	2:31:38	Melissa Bell	3:04:49
2019	Will Volkmann	2:30:59	Amanda Morris	2:59:16
2020	cancelled due to coronavirus pandemic			
2021	Adam Jones	2:23:50	Mimi Smith	2:48:37
2022	Jacob Rutz	2:38:44	Erin Del Giudice	2:49:51
2023	Sean Rager	2:31:18	Lauren Fulcher	3:08:51
2024	Adam Jones	2:26:50	Jessica Barkley	3:01:41

== Marathon entrants and finishers ==
Year	Entrants	Finishers (male)	Finishers (female)
2005	689	490	199
2006	895	n/a	n/a
2007	1018	655	310
2008	1143	582	258
2009	1885	975	434
2010	1292	844	448
2011	908	606	302
2012	1015	641	374
2013	862	576	286
2014	960	623	337
2015	923	569	355
2016	862	554	292
2017	873	542	310
2018	1083	568	321
2019	962	619	326
2020	cancelled due to coronavirus pandemic		
2023	1554	1094	414
