= Batibo =

Town in Cameroon

- Town
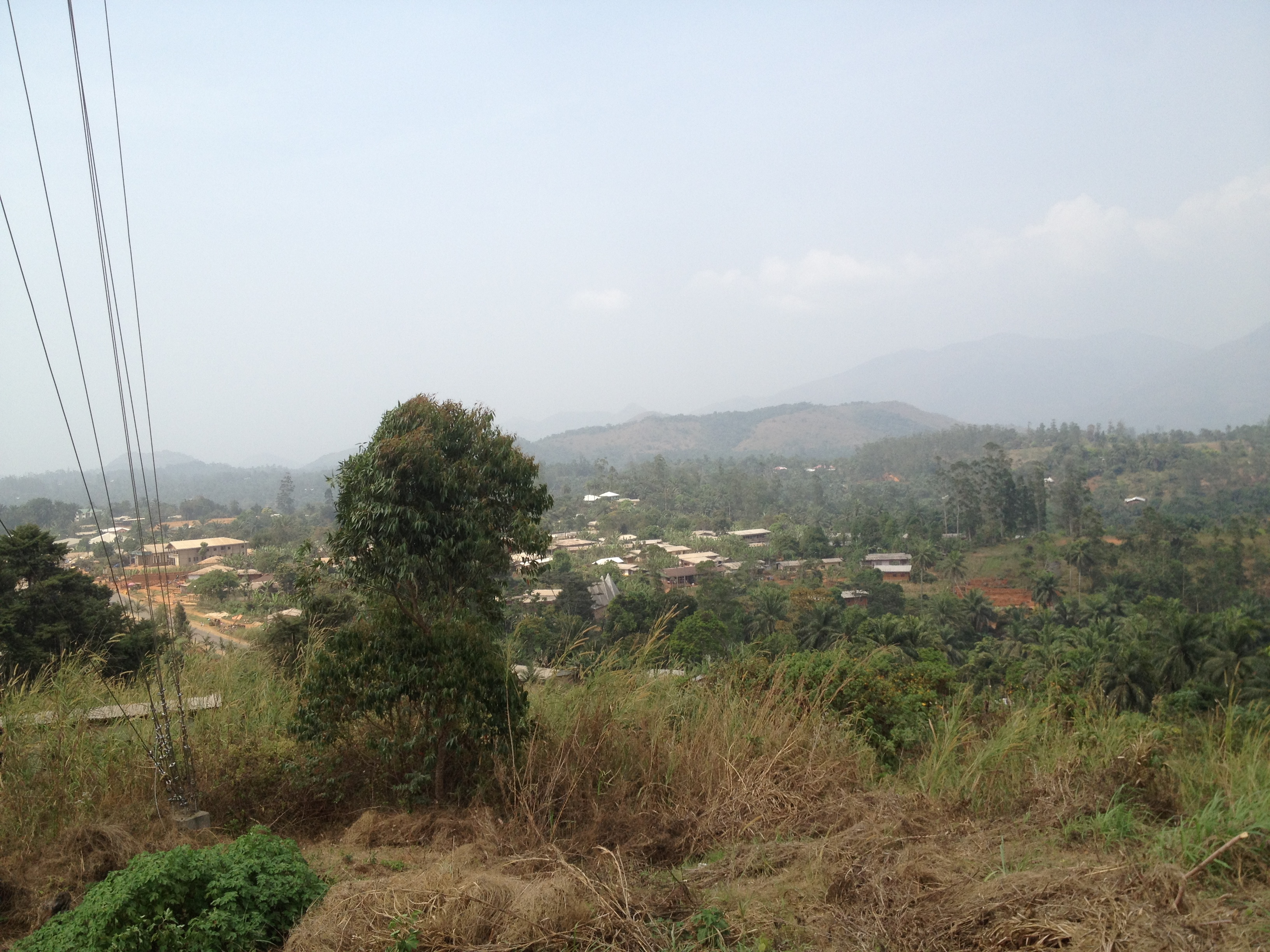
- View of Batibo
- Interactive map of Batibo
- Location in Cameroon
- Coordinates: 5°50′15″N 9°53′17″E
- Country: Cameroon
- Region: Northwest Region

Batibo is a name that refers to a town and a subdivision in Cameroon. It is located along the Trans-African Highway, 27 miles west of Bamenda and about 100 miles east of Nigeria. Batibo is the economic, social, political and cultural heartbeat of the Moghamo speaking people as well as the Greater Widikum tribe. Batibo, formerly referred to as Aghwi, is home to a people including farmers, traders, and craftsmen.

Batibo is the capital of Batibo Sub Division or Batibo Council and is located 40 kilometers southwest of Bamenda in the northwest region of Cameroon, along the Bamenda - Mamfe road. It is located between latitudes 575 and 590 north of the equator, longitudes 975 east of the Greenwich meridian, and at the transition between the equatorial forest in the south and the savannah to the north.

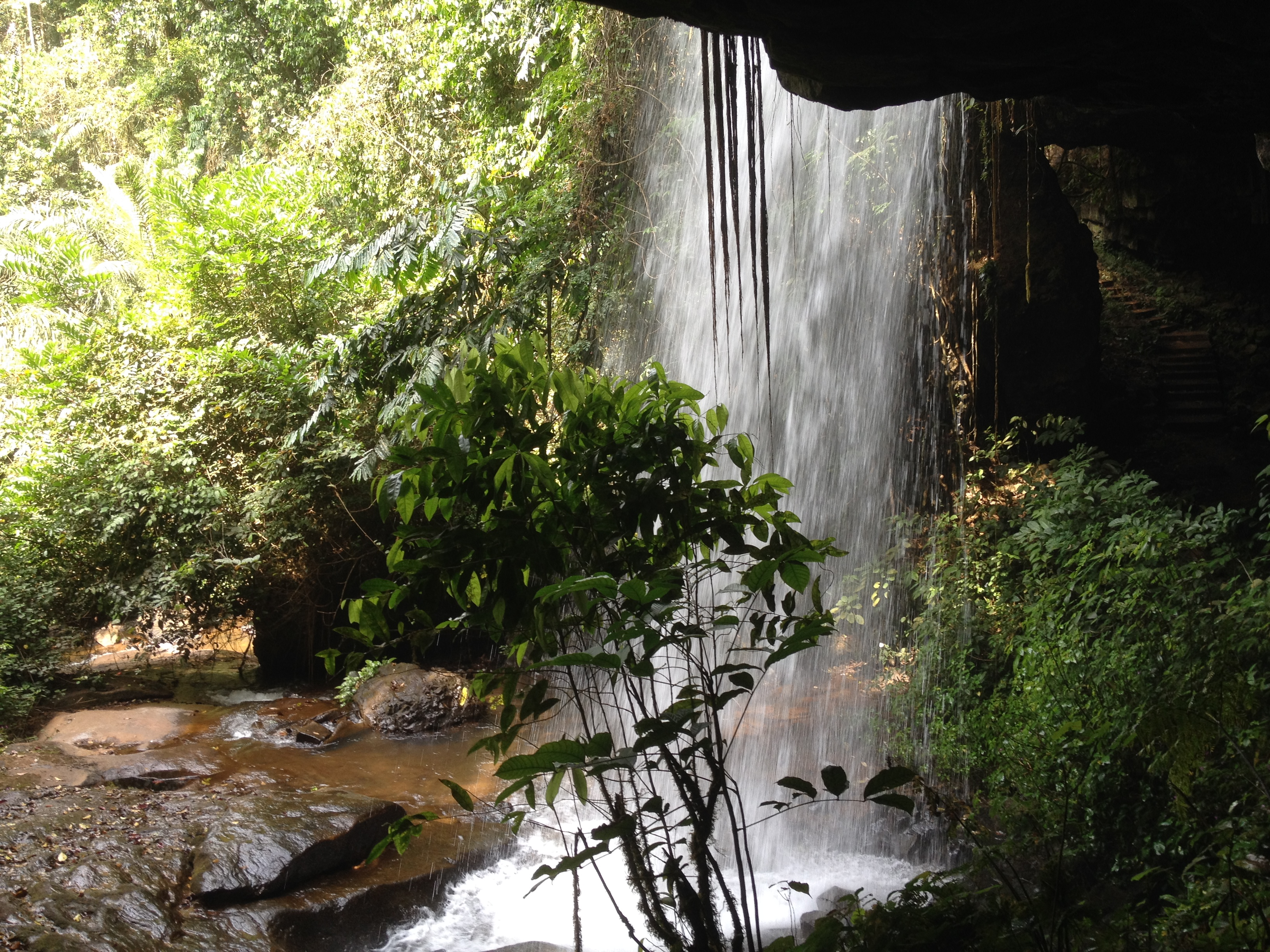
Batibo, Waterfall (3)

== Villages ==
Batibo comprises the following villages:

- Ambo
- Angie
- Anong
- Ashong
- Batibo
- Bessi
- Bessom
- Efah
- Enwen
- Enyoh
- Ewai
- Guzang
- Kugwe
- Kulabei
- Kuruku
- Mbengog
- Mbunjei
- Numben
- Nyengié
- Nygen Muwa
- Oshum
- Tiben

== Climate ==
Batibo experiences two seasons, the rainy and the dry seasons and the average number of rainy days is 165 within a calendar year, with annual rainfall recorded at approximately 2500 mm.

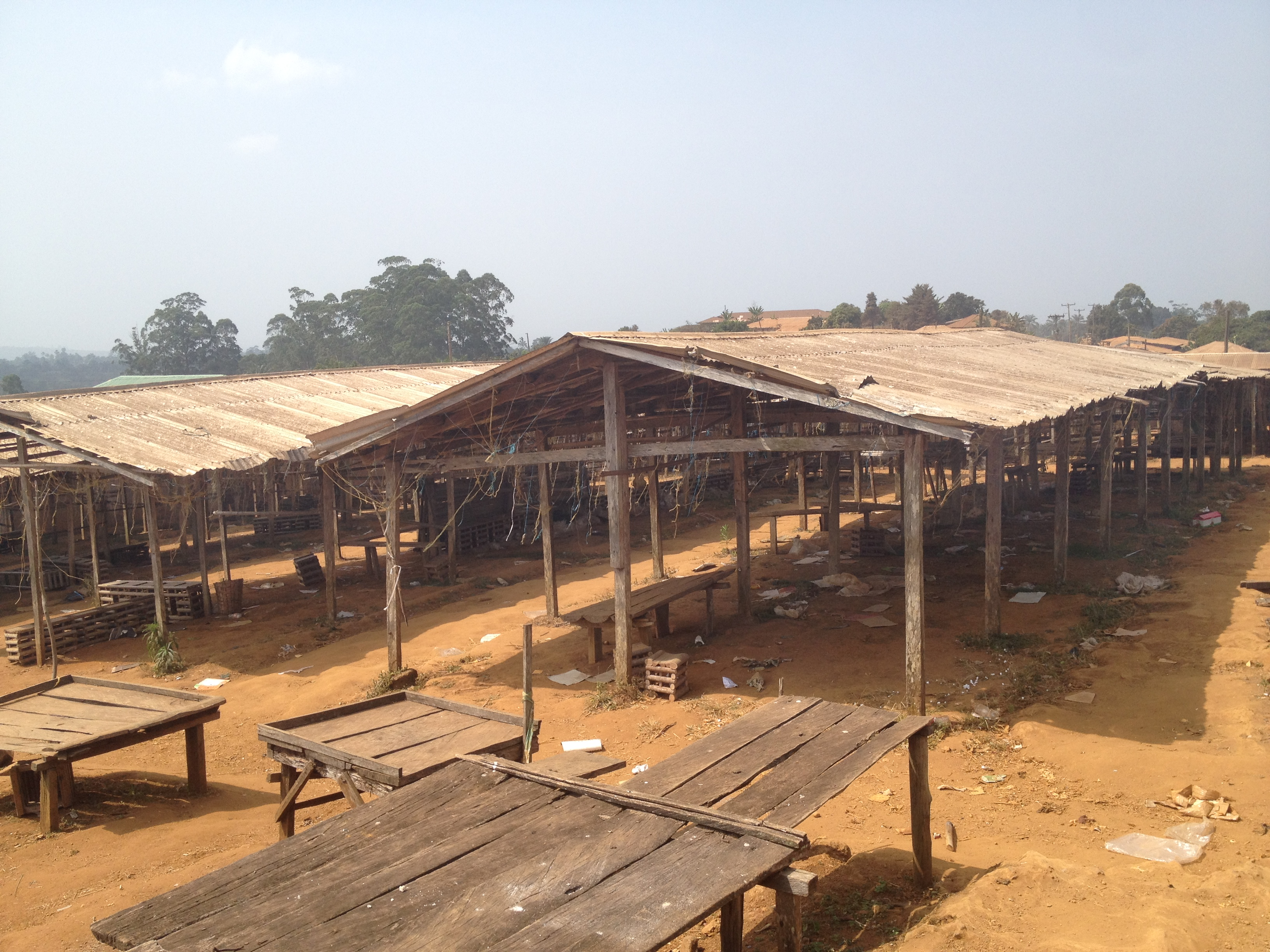
Market in Guzang (1)

== Statistics ==
- The time zone ID for Batibo is Africa/Douala.
- The population is estimated at twenty-thousand.

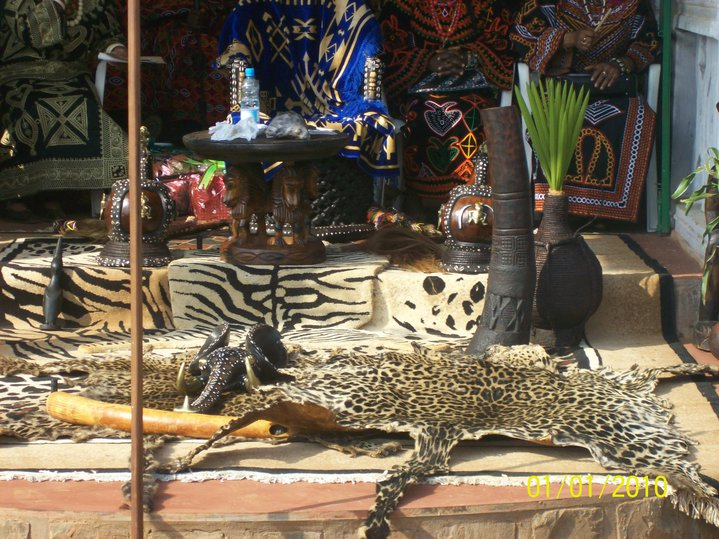
Batibo Palace

== Culture ==
Batibo culture portrays itself in rhythmic music, traditional outfits, artwork, and folklore and traditional rites. Batibo is sandwiched between the savannah and the tropical forests. The transitional climatic and vegetation zones have endowed the people with subsistent and cash crops. Crops include yams, beans, corn, peanuts, cassava, potatoes, tomatoes, bananas and plantains. Also cultivated in Batibo are perennial trees that produce palm nuts, plums, cashew nuts, kolanuts, coffee and cocoa. Fruits and vegetables grown include pineapples, passion fruit, guava, sugar cane, monkey kola, berries, okra, Bitter leaf, leeks, oranges, avocados, water melon and pawpaw.

=== Wine ===
Batibo and its catchment area of Moghamo is the palm wine capital of the world. The sweet white wine is tapped from the raffia palm tree. The white wine locally referred to as Fitchuk is a staple at all occasions including birth celebrations, engagements (knock-door), weddings, funerals and others. The wine is exported to all the other nine regions of Cameroon with areas as far as Yaounde and Douala. Fitchuk hardens with age and has actually been frozen and shipped to Europe and the USA where it is used to grace birth and marriage celebrations.

=== Food ===
Nang-cheuppi is a pourish made of cocoyams, and vegetables. Huckle Berry vegetables (Njama Njama) and cocoyams are often used in meals. The over twelve types of yams are cooked with meat, fish, chicken, vegetables and spices. Other foods consumed by the Batibo people include: rice, fufu, ndole, eru, achu, miyondo, koki, garri. One of the special meals eaten by the batibo people is a type of cocoyam called "Nang Kon" with a soup known as "abanwa" (leaves of a certain tree, these leave regulate the blood pressure of most people having high blood pressure) with tadpoles inside the soup.

The inhabitants of Batibo engage in animal husbandry. Animals raised in Batibo and Moghamo include goats, sheep, cows, rabbits and pigs. Pigs are commonly eaten on social events. In addition to those animals, chickens are also raised both in poultries and as free range.

=== Music ===
It is an inhabitant of Batibo who originated the quote "Music is the fruit of life's creative and rhythmic juices". A visit to any cultural occasion in Batibo will reveal the rhythmic culture. The Batibo inhabitants and their catchment area of Moghamo have a culture that is full of music, folklore, and dance. The traditional dances include the Tiwara, Nchibi, Mareway, Ambolo, Njang, and Ngo, Fongwa not forgetting the Royal dance and the Nere.The Nere dance is an annual festival dance celebrated during the Xmas vacation. This annual festival dance brings most of the Batibo people both in the country and abroad back home to celebrate the festival.

== See also ==
- R.A.M Tebo II of Batibo
