= Njikwa =

Coordinates: 6°05′N 9°53′E

- Commune and town
- Interactive map of Njikwa
- Country: Cameroon
- Time zone: UTC+1 (WAT)

Njikwa is a town and commune in Cameroon.
