= Mankon =

Geo-historic community in Bamenda, Cameroon

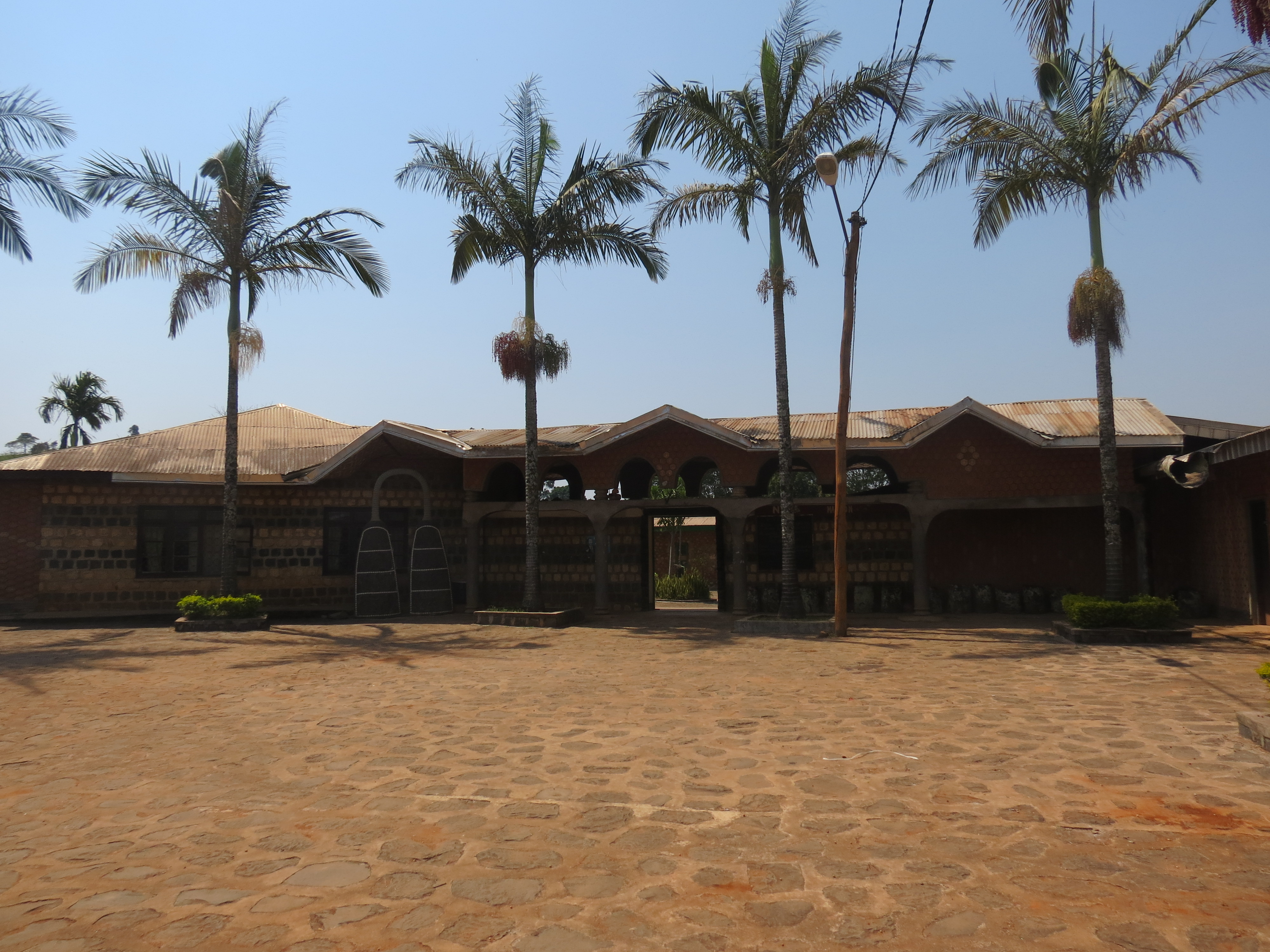
The palace of the fon in Mankon

Mankon (historically spelled Mankong) is a geo-historic community constituting a large part of Bamenda in Cameroon, formed as an amalgamation of about five different ethnic groups. The Mankon fondom (kingdom) represents one of the oldest monarchies of the grassfield people of the Northwest Province. The fondom is ruled by a fon (king) with rights to kinghood acquired by birth. The crowned fon is usually a designated son of the deceased king, a child who was born only during his reign.

== Colonial history ==
In the late 19th century, the Mankon people fought against German colonial forces, in a conflict that became known as the Battle of Mankon. German colonial forces, allied with the Bali people, were led by Eugen Zintgraff and severely outnumbered the Mankon. The first two conflicts saw the German and Bali force, armed with guns and cannons, defeated at the hands of the spear- and machete-toting Mankon warriors. Some of Zintgraff's men had to flee on foot to as far as Babungo. But the Mankon people were finally defeated in a third conflict in 1901.

The Mankon community remained under German control until after World War I, when northwestern Cameroon became a British mandate territory later trust territory. This situation remained until the British-administered Cameroons achieved independence in 1961.

The Mankon Cultural and Development Association is a cultural group that brings people of this kingdom together wherever they might be in the world to promote their culture and assists in development projects in the kingdom. The group has branches in major cities and towns in Cameroon and all over the world especially in the United States of America. Annual celebrations are held in different cities in the US to celebrate and commune with each other. The first of such gathering known as a convention started in Minneapolis, Minnesota in 2006. The Mankon Students Association, bring students from different institutions of learning together in Mankon during the summer holidays to enable interaction, development of relationships, promotion of cultural values and activities and to contribute to the development of Mankon.

== Tourism ==
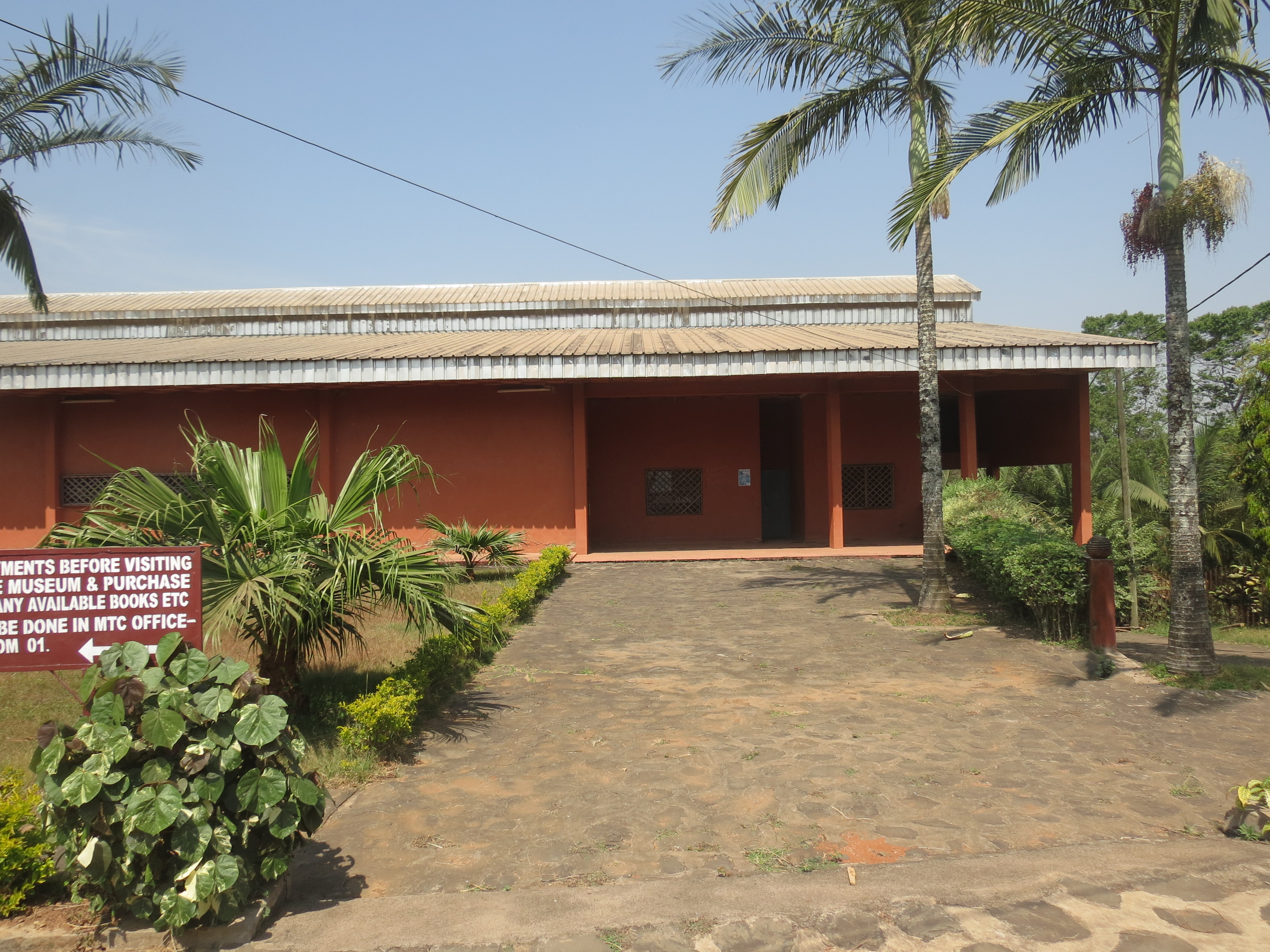
The museum in Mankon Palace

Mankon plays host to several tourism conveniences amongst which is a modern museum located at the ntoh, the palace of the fon, and is open to the public. This museum is a major tourist destination in Northwest Province, with a gallery of art and craft dating back several centuries.

The most convenient time to visit the Mankon fondom is during the December and New Year periods when the kingdom has its annual dance, during which the people celebrate and also have the rare occasion of mixing with the fon. Festivities may last a week and it is a great time for cultural display. Such festivities give the Mankon people the opportunity to savor the varied rhythms of African music and to meet expert drummers and musicians of the kingdom.

== Fon ==
Fon of Mankon include:

- Fomukong (1799–1866)
- Fon Angwafo II (1866–1919)
- Ndefru III (1919–1959)
- Fon Angwafo III of Mankon (1959–2022). 20th fon of Mankon
- Fon Angwafo IV (2022–Present)

== Culture ==
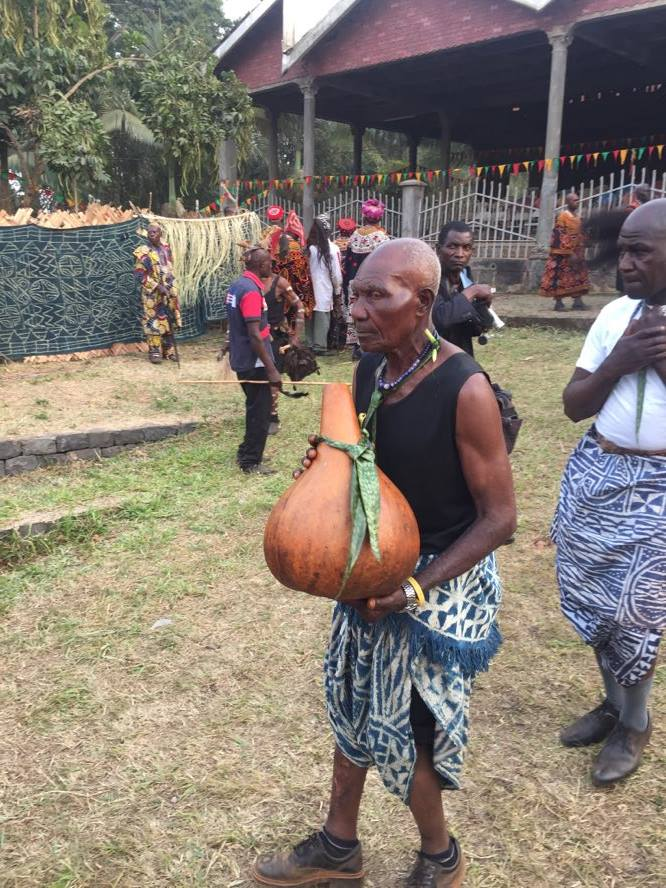
Traditional Calabash

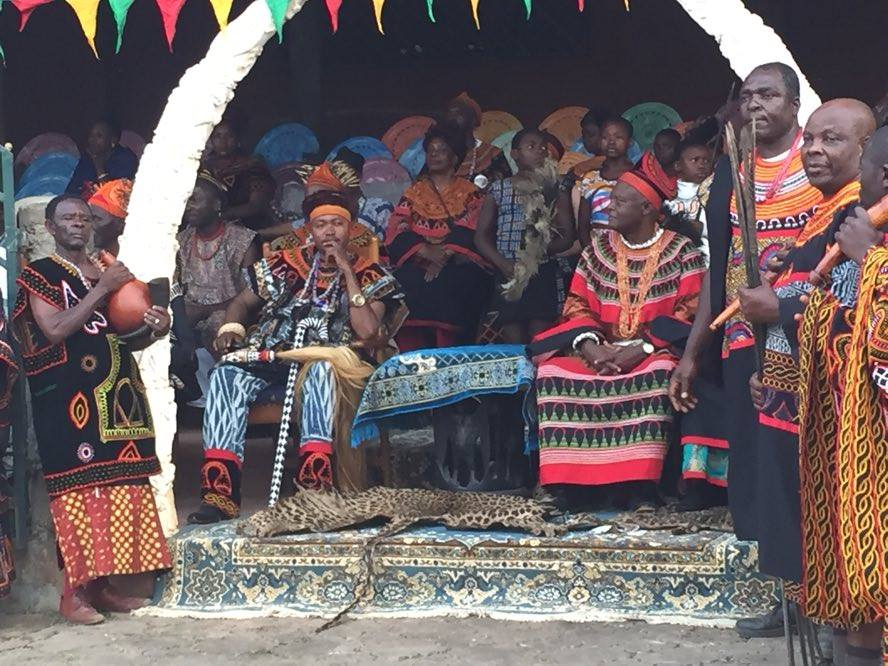

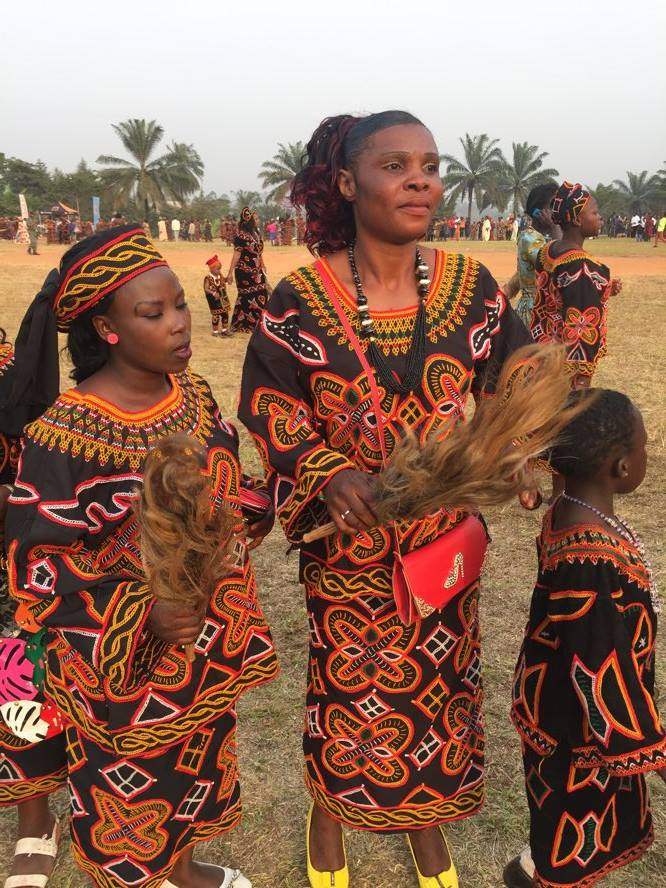

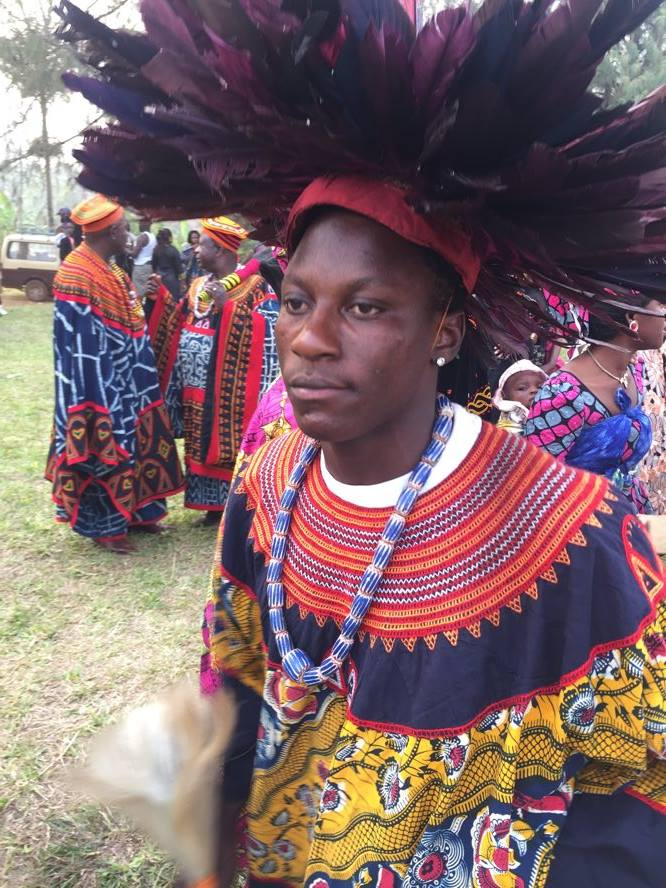

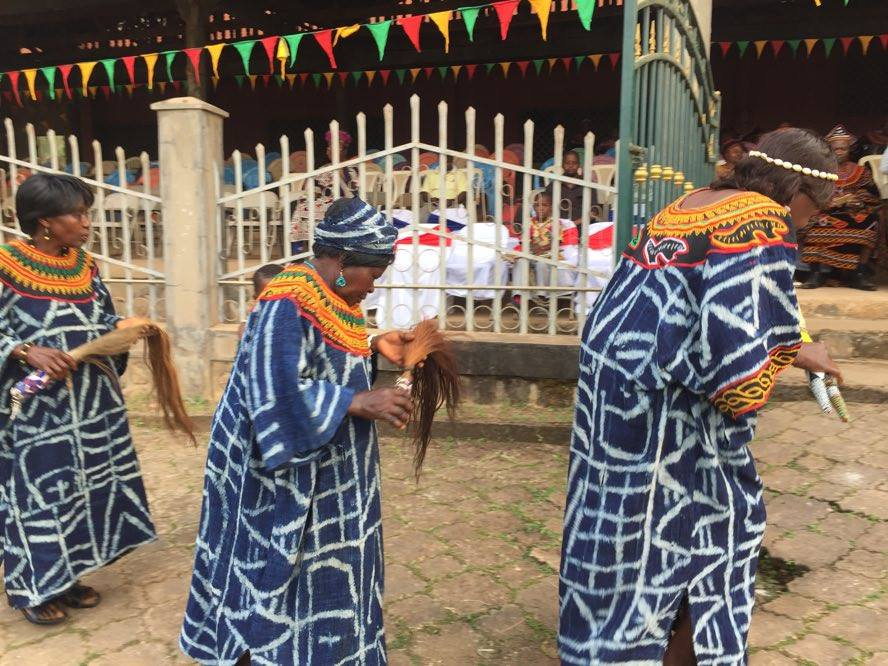

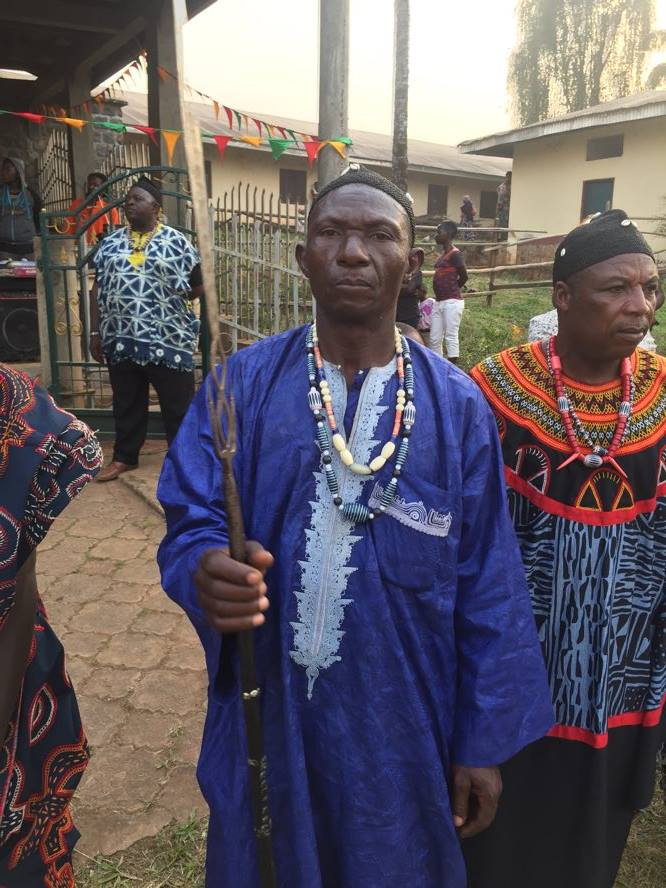

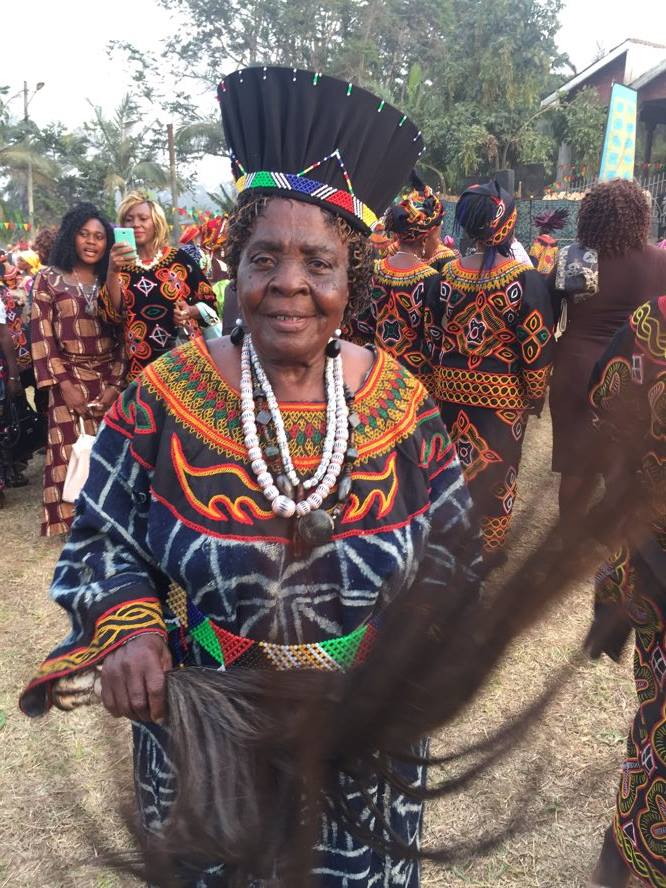

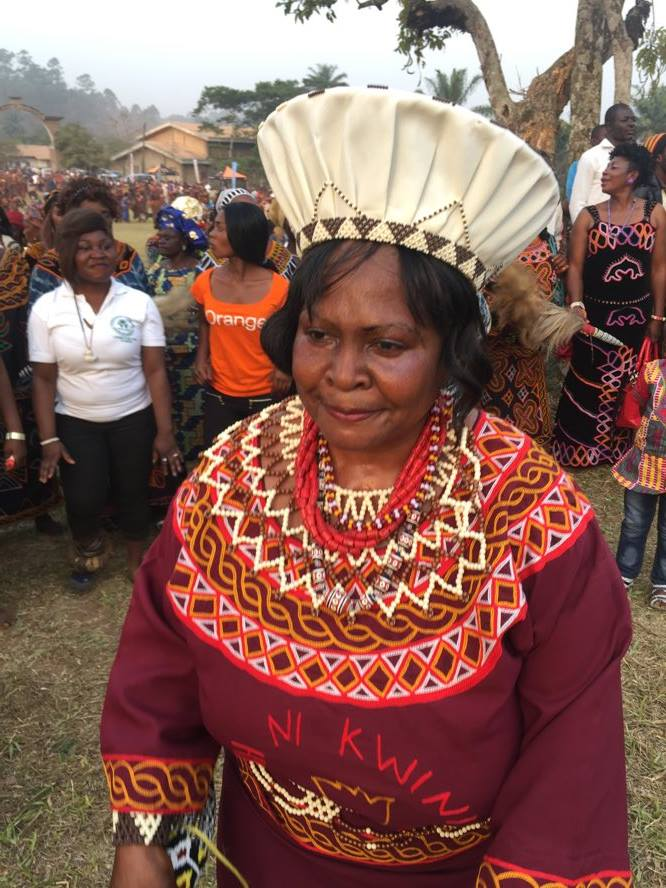

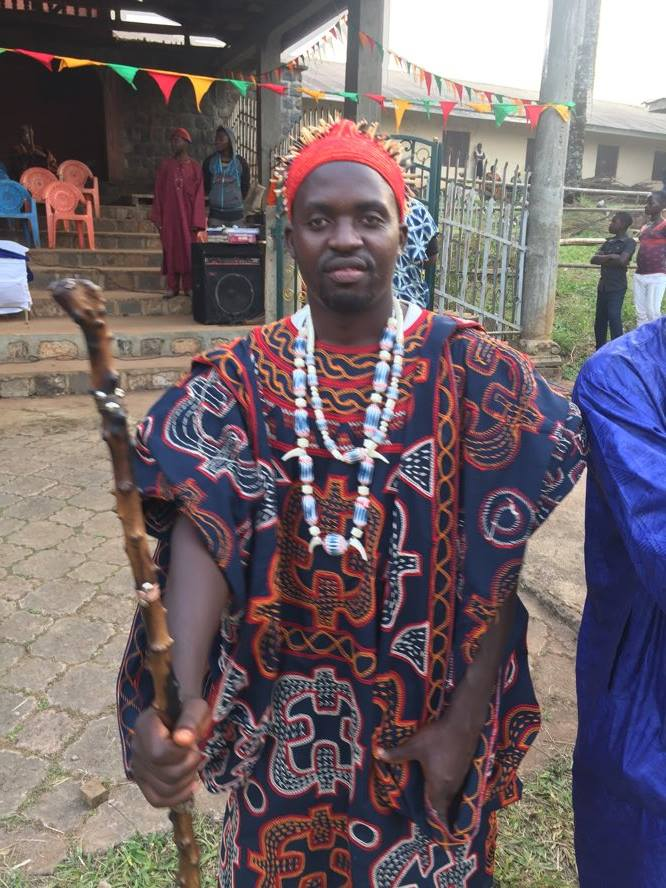

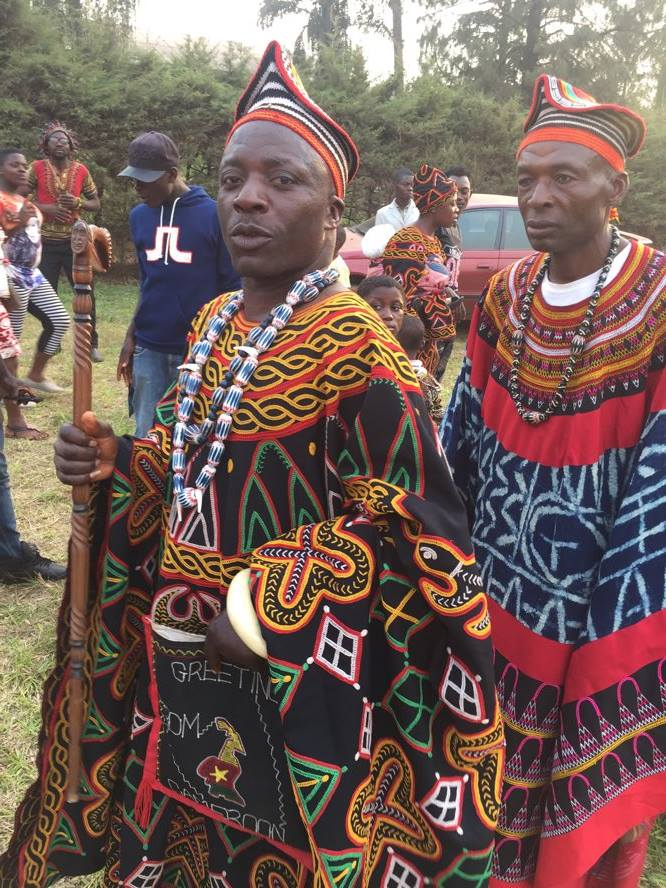

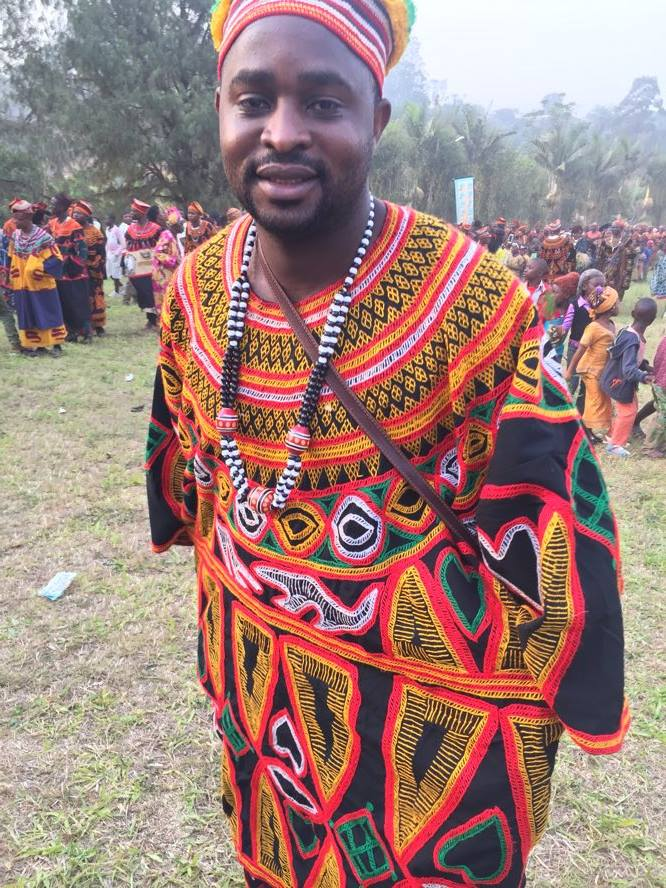

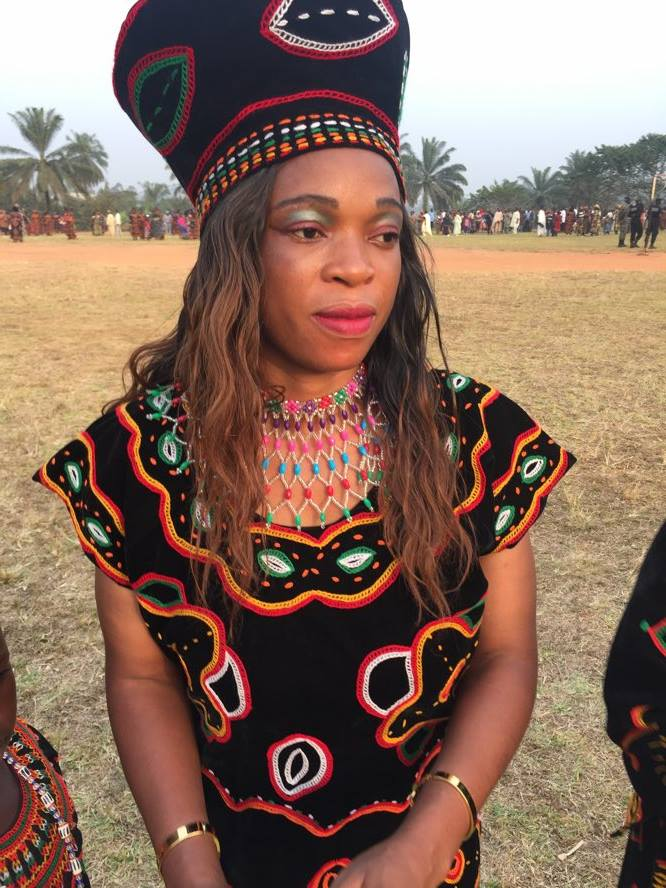

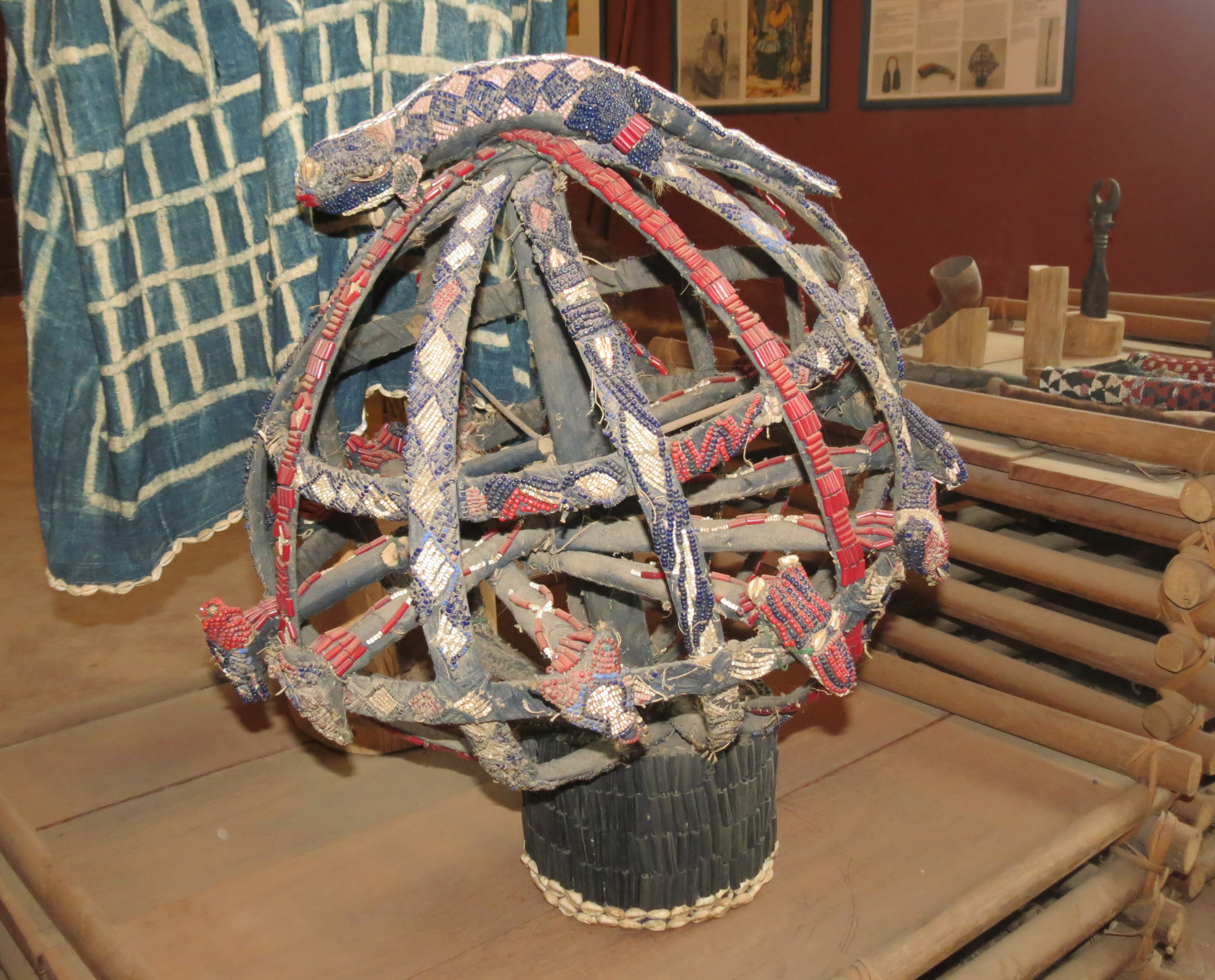
Mankon Palace Museum, headgear
