= Mbengwi =

Commune in Northwest Region, Cameroon

- Location in Cameroon
- Coordinates: 6°1′N 10°0′E
- Country: Cameroon
- Region: Northwest Region
- Department: Momo

Mbengwi is the headquarters of Momo Department in the Northwest Region of Cameroon, located some 22 km from Bamenda.

== Information ==
The indigenous people are Meta people, to whom a few settlers from neighboring tribes like Ngie and Oshie have been added (see references to Dillon's work). The name "Mbengwi" means "a land of wild animals" in the Meta language since it used to be a hunting ground in the precolonial days, though it was settled before it became upgraded to an administrative centre. Today, this is still the principal function of the town whose growth has stagnated because of youth exodus and lack of income generating activities -both in the town and its hinterland.Interesting sites in include the Abi waterfalls in the heart of town and the Catholic monastery.Ecological attractions include wildlife watching (especially birds) and fishing in the Abi and Mezam Rivers.For people with anthropological interests, the 30 or so Fon's palaces (centers of traditional rule)offer an artistic wealth that is the envy of any Museum on African Art (especially woodwork) with artifacts dating back more than 300 years. For the culturally minded, the annual MECUDA (Meta Elites Cultural and Development Association)organised dance competition are also a must see. It usually comes up between December and March and offers the opportunity for this people to showcase a cultural heritage of more than 50 traditional dances.Sometimes plays and competitions in sports and other activities are organized (including agric shows).

== Etymology ==
The name Momo is derived from the River Momo, which runs through the division, crossing the Mamfe-Bamenda road at mile 71.

== Education and schools ==
Mbengwi has a lot of schools one of the biggest of which is Government Bilingual High School (GBHS) Mbengwi, which is rivalled by only 7 other Government high schools in Cameroon in terms of infrastructure. It also has other schools like Government Technical High School (GTHS), Government Teachers' Training College (GTTC), Government Technical Teachers' Training College (GTTTC), Presbyterian Teachers' Training College (PTTC), Full Gospel Mission Teacher Training College (FGTTC) and St. Joseph Catholic Comprehensive College (SJCCC). Most Schools in Mbengwi are boarding schools which means most students live in the schools during the school year.

Most secondary (post-primary)schools have to take an exam called GCE (General Certificate of Education)at the end of the 5 years in college and another 2 years later (Advanced levels).

== Controversy ==
Salomon Tandeng Muna one of the architects of Cameroon history hails from the Meta clan. His residence is just a few kilometres in a nearby village called Ngyen-Mbo between Mbengwi and Bamenda. Muna fueled the construction of the prison in Mbengwi. A thing people have always frowned on and termed it as a mockery to his own people. Recently in January 2006 on the commemoration of the 4th anniversary of his death his children defended his idea of a prison saying the main objective was to see how juvenile and other inmates could be reformed. Muna's political heritage includes the reunification of Cameroon but he is most remembered as a man who had a steadfast belief in hard work and meritocracy and persistently resisted the temptation to give sinecures to his tribesmen and friends, thus fighting the tribalism and nepotism which haunts most African countries today, including Muna's successors in power. But the lesson was well learned by his children and other Meta people who today rank among the African elite in such fields as law, medicine, engineering (especially in aviation) and the cocoa exportation business.

== Natural resources ==
=== Palm oil ===
Arguably, the most potent natural product of Momo Division is palm oil and concomitant products. Although the division boasts no palm plantations of the calibre present in the fertile zone at the foot of Mount Cameroon, there is an abundance of wild groves of oil palm trees that supply a substantial portion of the palm oil consumed in the North West Province. Most of the oil originates in Ngie Sub-Division, a neighboring area to Mbengwi.

=== Coffee and cocoa ===
These are also some of the principal agricultural products originating in Momo Division.

=== Kola nuts ===
This is also one of the leading cash crops produced in Momo Division. However, most of the farm output is locally consumed food crops (grain and tubers), some of which is sold on the weekly (the Meta week is 8 days) Tad Market to merchants from Bamenda. But the place is a net importer of food. A lot of cultivable land lies in waste because of rural exodus and annual grass burning which is also very damaging to wildlife. Cattle rearers inhabit the distant hills and sometimes make forays into the towns for some green grass for their beasts.

=== Hydroelectricity ===
The area has a huge hydroelectricity potential afforded by the Abi falls and several projects to generate electricity have encountered severe and often unsurmountable problems of political will as witnessed by the uncompleted dam that runs along the Bamenda-Mbengwi Road at the fording point on the Abi River.

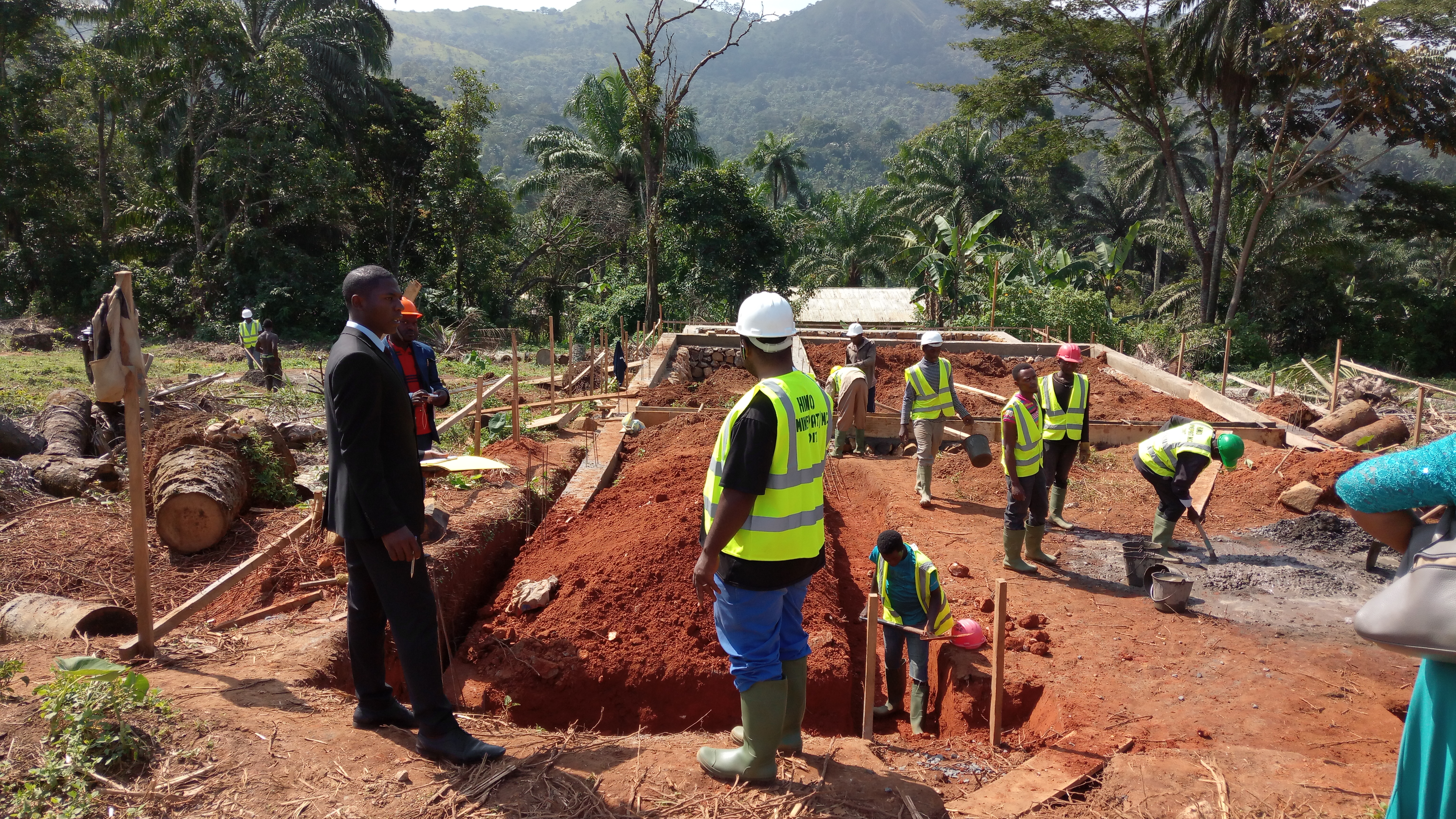
Construction of classrooms by Mbengwi council

== Notable people ==
- Ephraim Fombi, politician
