= Religious pluralism =

Stance of supporting peaceful coexistence and diversity of spiritual belief

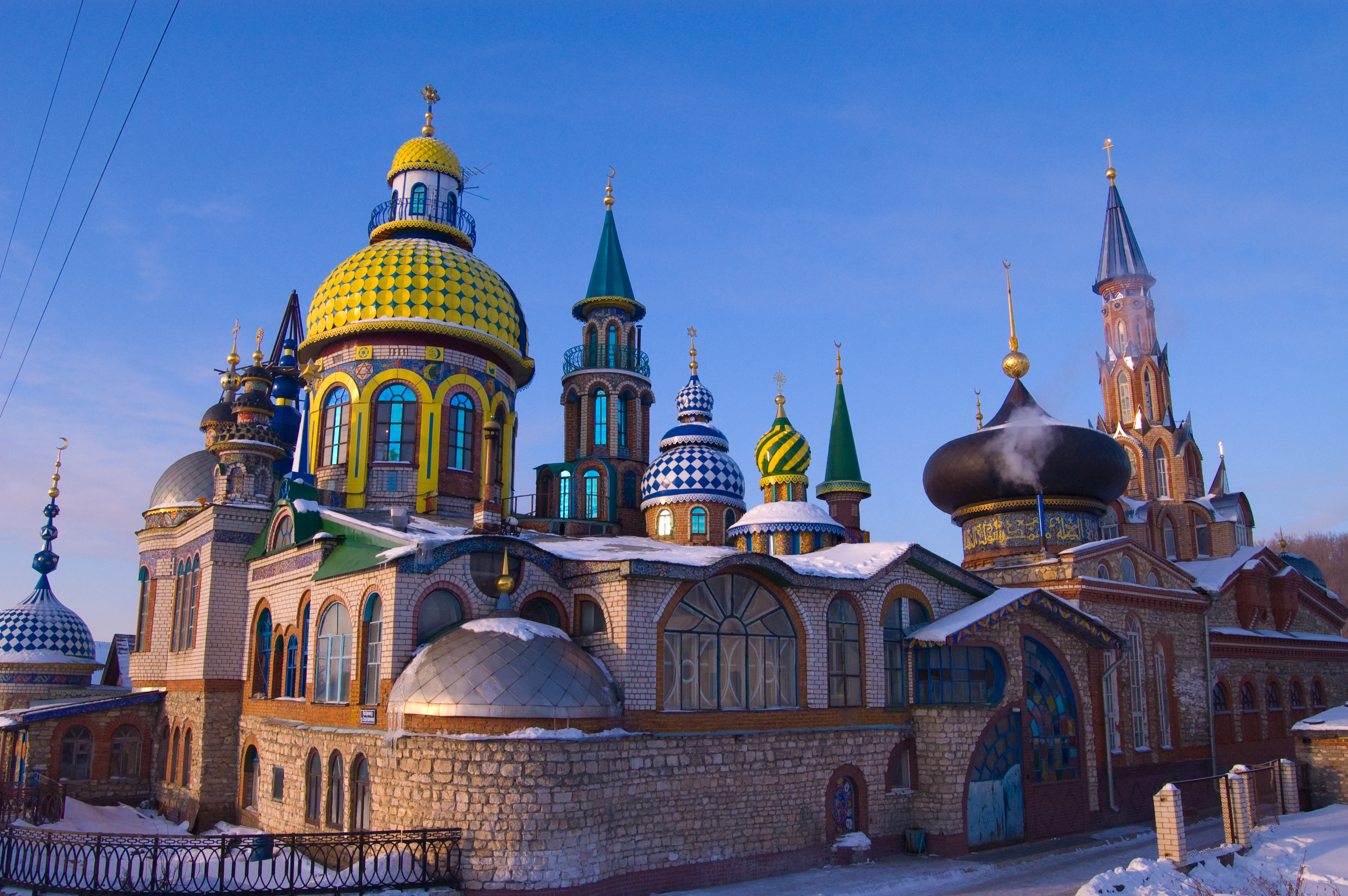
Temple of All Religions in Kazan, Russia

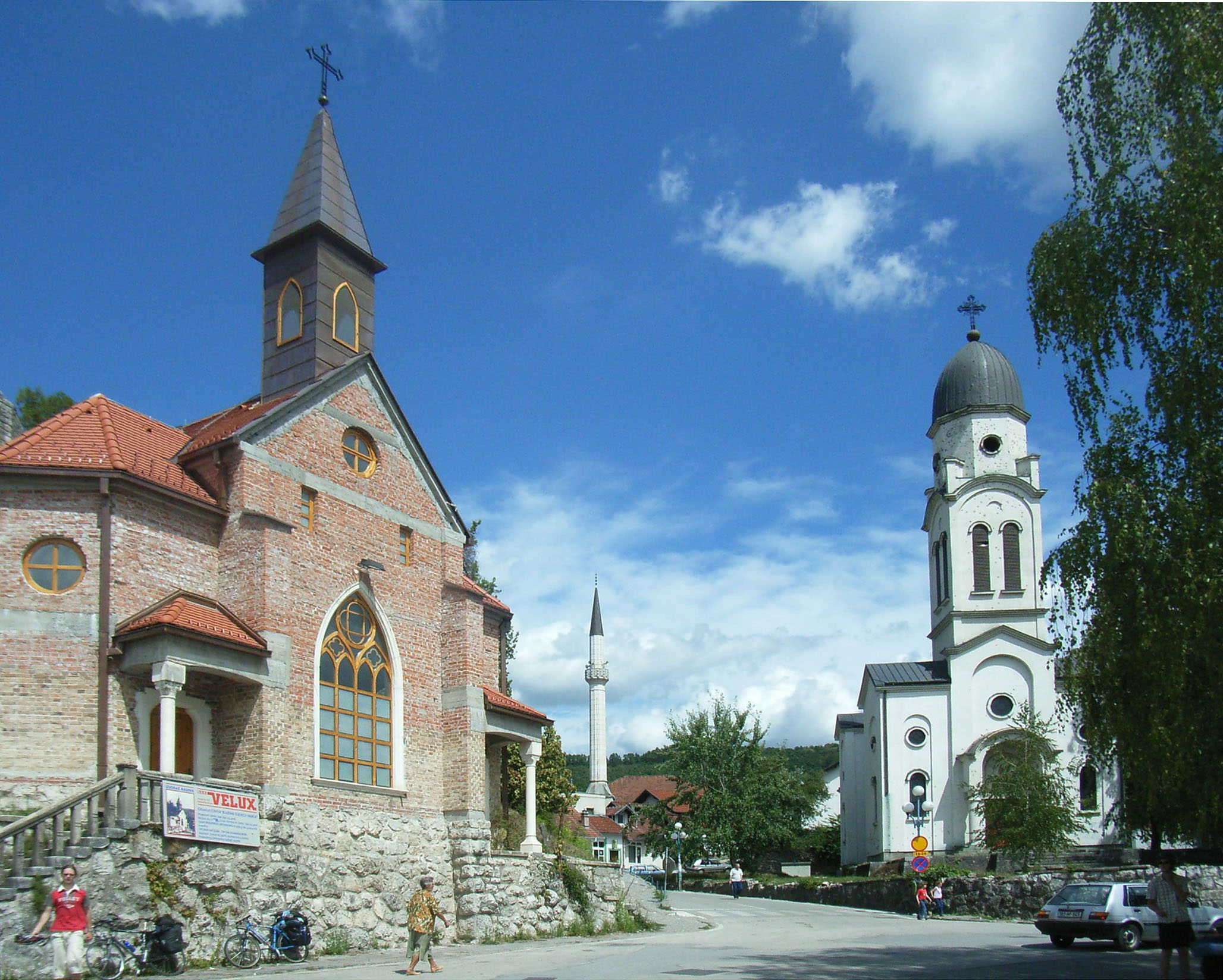
Catholic church, Mosque and Serbian Orthodox Church in Bosanska Krupa, Bosnia and Herzegovina

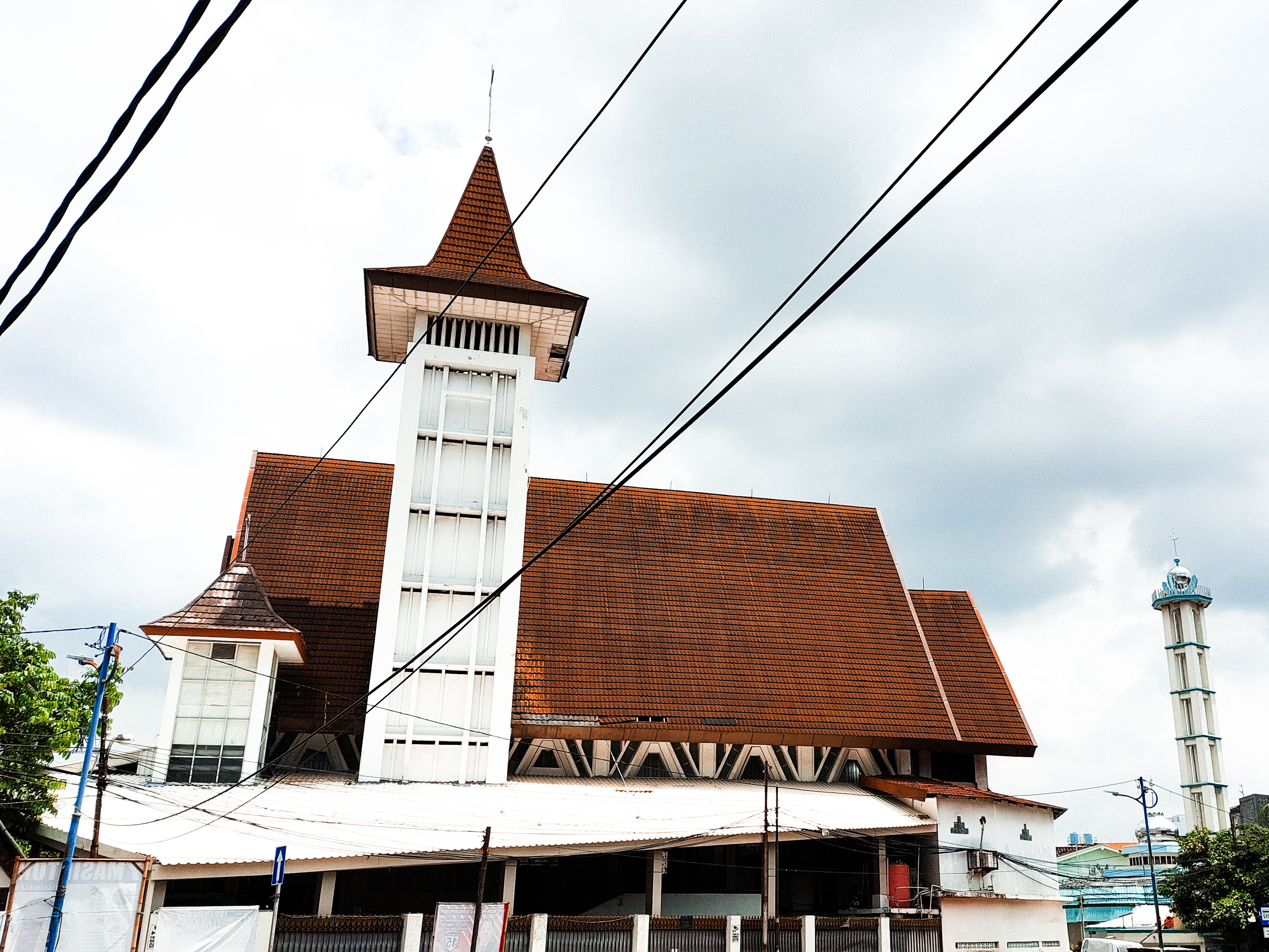
Batak Christian Protestant Church is located next to the Al Istikharah Mosque in Jakarta, Indonesia.

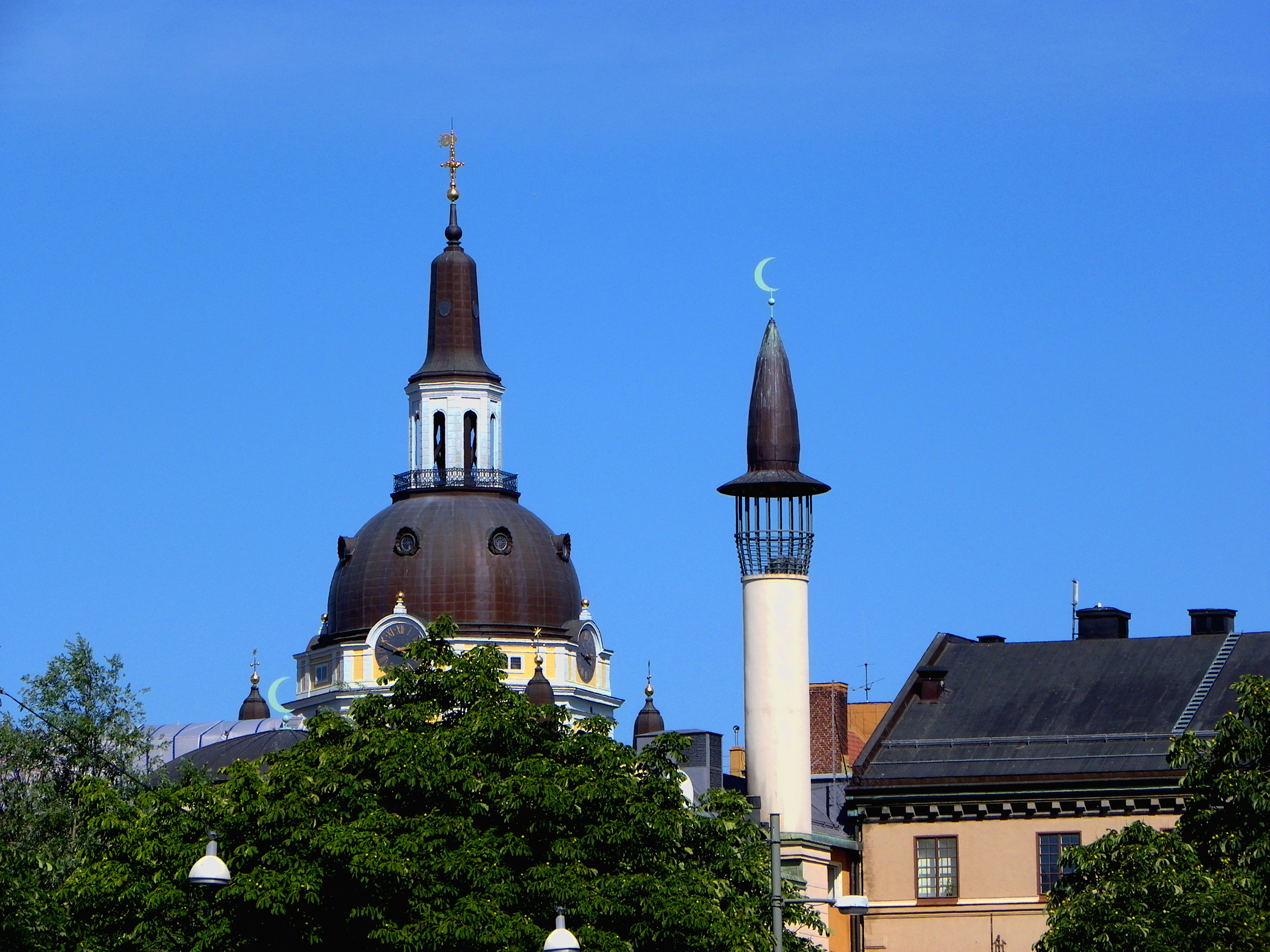
In Sweden, religions coexist: Katarina Church and the minaret of the Stockholm Mosque

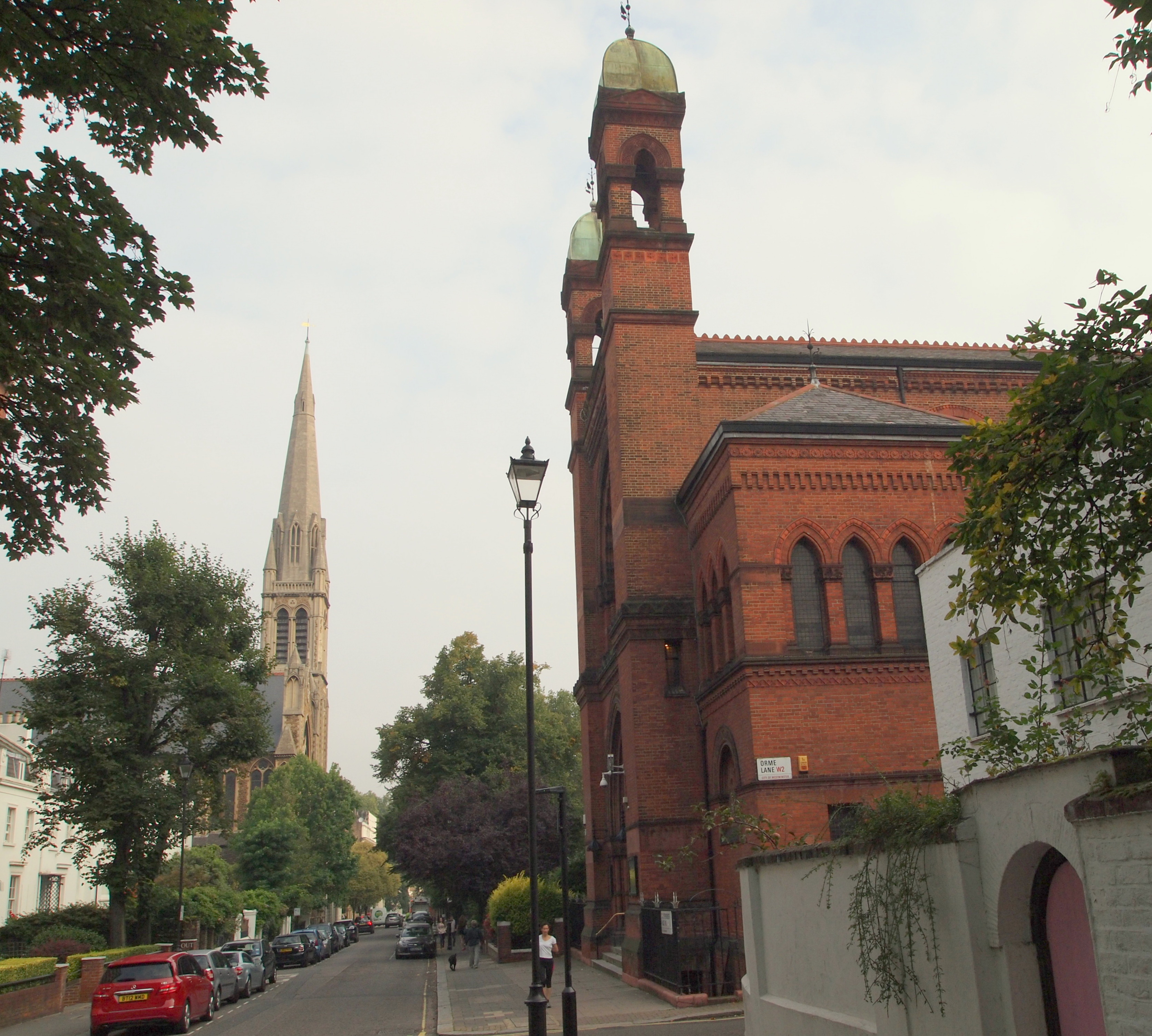
The West London Synagogue and the Church of Saint Matthew in London, England

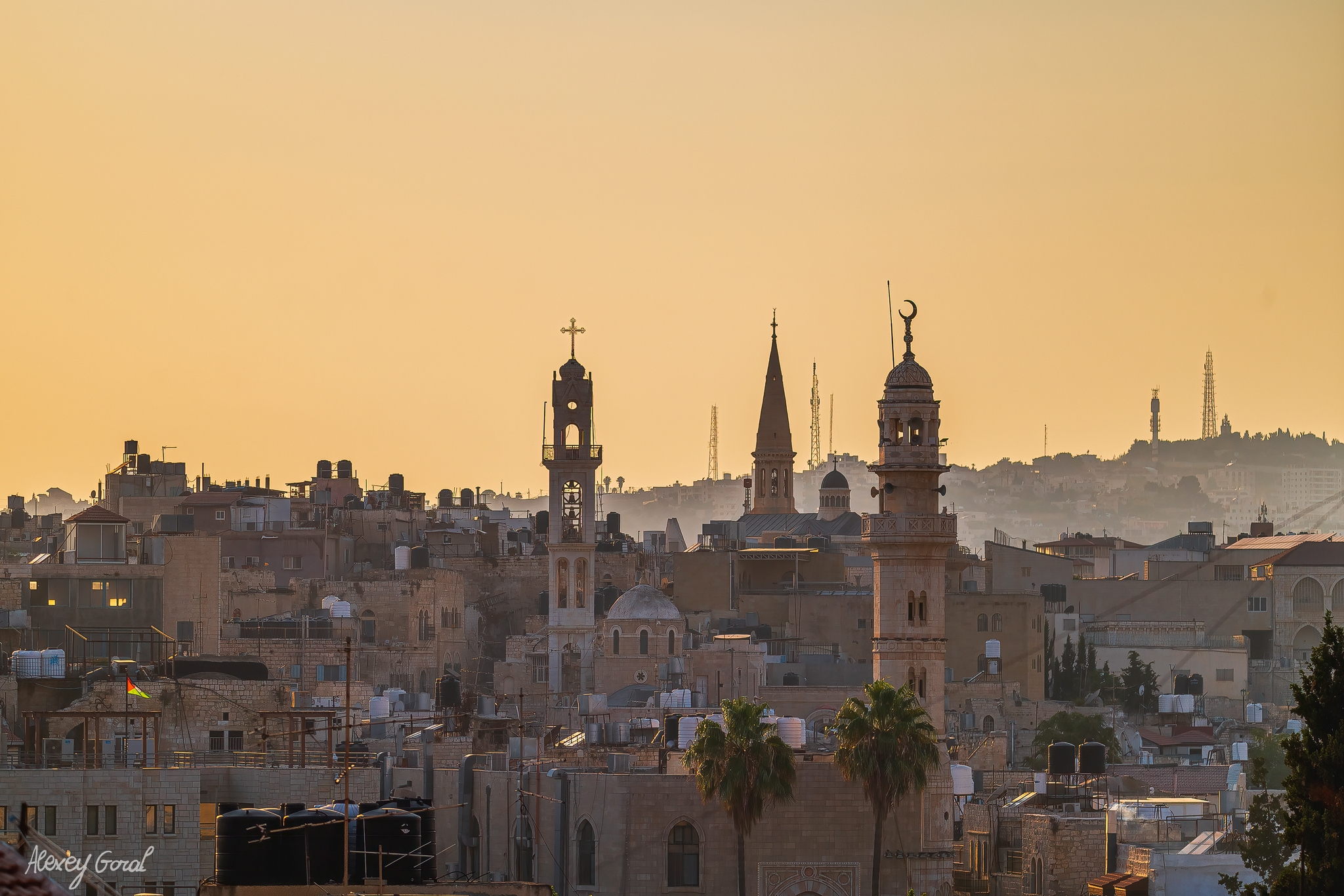
Skyline of Bethlehem with the Mosque of Omar, the Evangelical Lutheran Christmas Church, Salesian Church of the Sacred Heart of Jesus in Bethlehem

Religious pluralism is an attitude or policy regarding the diversity of religious belief systems co-existing in society. It can indicate one or more of the following:

- Recognizing and tolerating the religious diversity of a society or country, promoting freedom of religion, and defining secularism as neutrality (of the state or non-sectarian institution) on issues of religion as opposed to opposition of religion in the public forum or public square that is open to public expression, and promoting friendly separation of religion and state as opposed to hostile separation or antitheism espoused by other forms of secularism.
- Any of several forms of religious inclusivism. One such worldview holds that one's own religion is not the sole and exclusive source of truth, and thus acknowledges that at least some truths and true values exist in other religions. Another concept is that two or more religions with mutually exclusive truth claims are equally valid; this may be considered a form of either toleration (a concept that arose as a result of the European wars of religion) or moral relativism.
- Perennialism (based on the concept of philosophia perennis) is the understanding that the exclusive claims of different religions turn out, upon closer examination, to be variations of universal truths that have been taught since time immemorial. While some perennialists are universalists who accept religious syncretism, those of the Traditionalist School reject it, and uphold the importance of the historical, "orthodox" faiths.
- Sometimes as a synonym for ecumenism, i.e., the promotion of some level of unity, co-operation, and improved understanding between different religions or different denominations within a single religion.
- As a term for the condition of harmonious co-existence between adherents of different religions or religious denominations.

== Definition and scopes ==
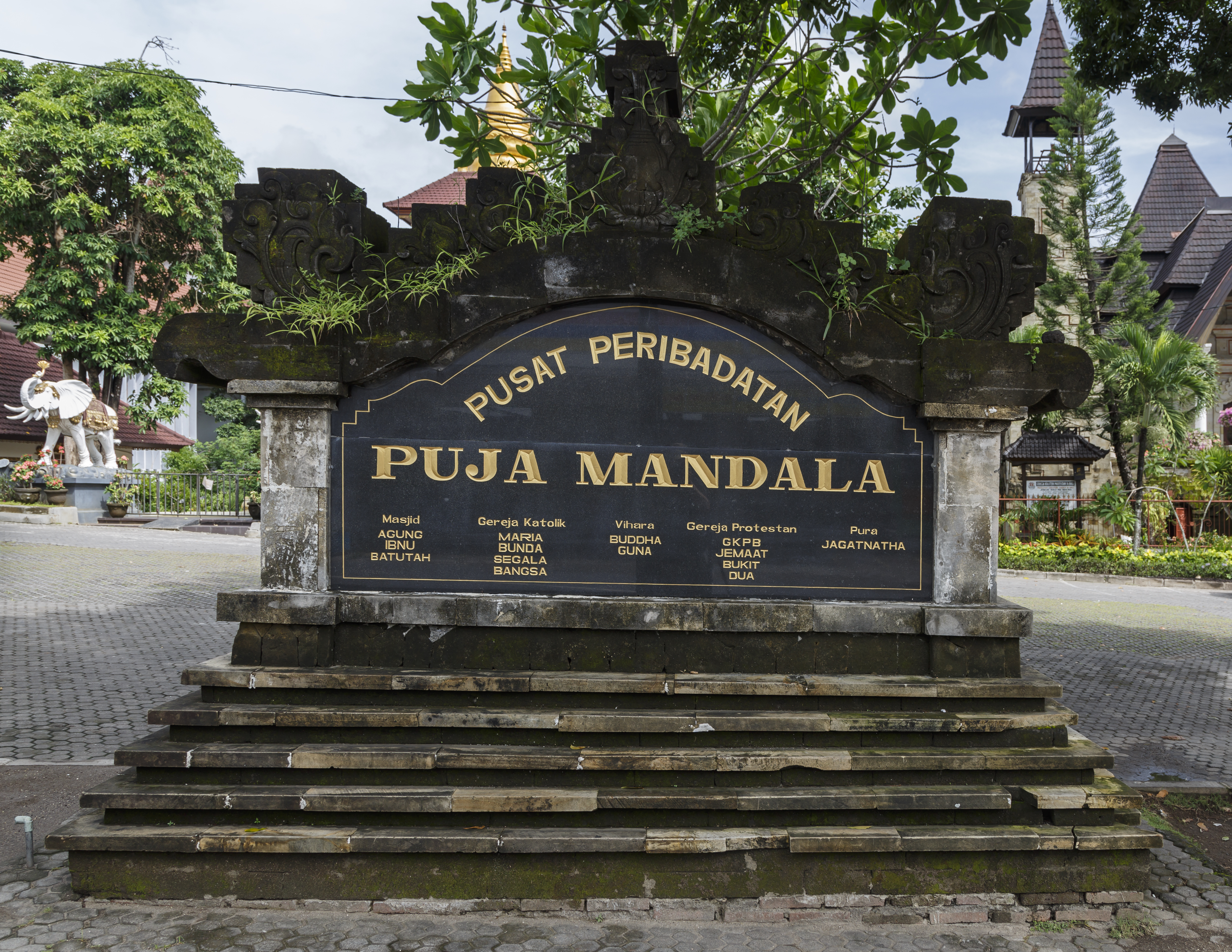
Puja Mandala, a temple that symbolizes tolerance of diversity in Indonesia located in Kuta, Bali

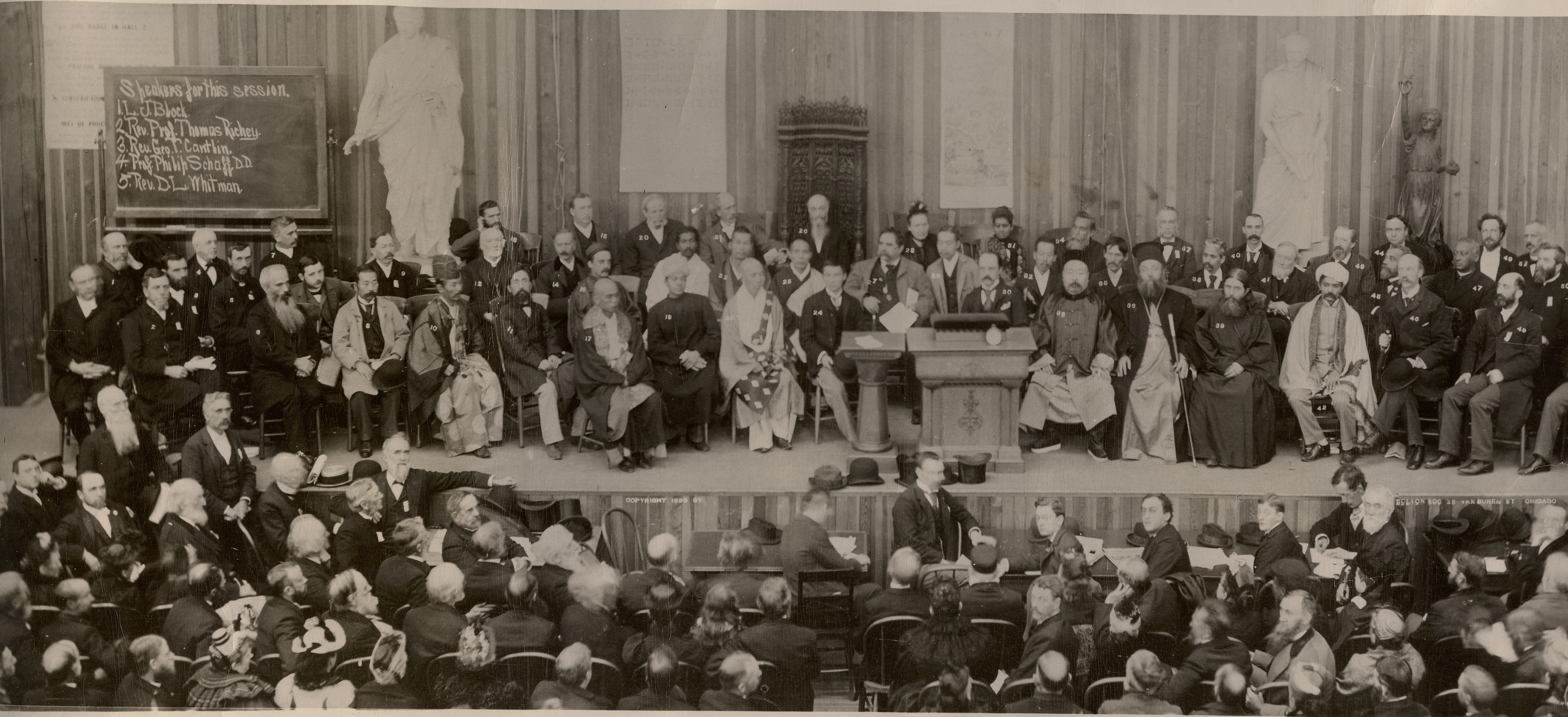
Congress of Parliament of the World's Religions, Chicago, 1893

Religious pluralism, to paraphrase the title of a recent academic work, goes beyond mere toleration. Chris Beneke, in Beyond Toleration: The Religious Origins of American Pluralism, explains the difference between religious tolerance and religious pluralism by pointing to the situation in the late 18th century United States. By the 1730s, in most colonies religious minorities had obtained what contemporaries called religious toleration: "The policy of toleration relieved religious minorities of some physical punishments and some financial burdens, but it did not make them free from the indignities of prejudice and exclusion. Nor did it make them equal. Those 'tolerated' could still be barred from civil offices, military positions, and university posts." In short, religious toleration is only the absence of religious persecution, and does not necessarily preclude religious discrimination. However, in the following decades something extraordinary happened in the Thirteen Colonies, at least if one views the events from "a late eighteenth-century perspective". Gradually the colonial governments expanded the policy of religious toleration, but then, between the 1760s and the 1780s, they replaced it with "something that is usually called religious liberty". Mark Silka, in "Defining Religious Pluralism in America: A Regional Analysis", states that religious pluralism "enables a country made up of people of different faiths to exist without sectarian warfare or the persecution of religious minorities. Understood differently in different times and places, it is a cultural construct that embodies some shared conception of how a country's various religious communities relate to each other and to the larger nation whole."

Religious pluralism can be defined as "respecting the otherness of others". Freedom of religion encompasses all religions acting within the law in a particular region. Exclusivist religions teach that theirs is the only way to salvation and to religious truth, and some of them would even argue that it is necessary to suppress the falsehoods taught by other religions. Some Protestant sects argue fiercely against Roman Catholicism, and fundamentalist Christians of all kinds teach that religious practices like those of Paganism and witchcraft are pernicious. This was a common historical attitude prior to the Enlightenment, and has informed governmental policy into the present day. For instance, Saudi Arabia has no protection for freedom of religion, and the country's non-Muslim population are at risk for discrimination and arrest on religious grounds. Of course, many religious communities have long been engaged in building peace, justice, and development themselves, and the emergence of the secular peacemaking field has led religious communities to systematize and institutionalize their own peacebuilding and interfaith work. The Catholic Church has worked in development and poverty reduction, human rights, solidarity, and peace, and after World War II, it began to develop specific tools and apply conflict transformation practices.

Giving one religion or denomination special rights that are denied to others can weaken religious pluralism. This situation was observed in Europe through the Lateran Treaty and Church of England. In the modern era, many Islamic countries have laws that criminalize the act of leaving Islam for someone born into a Muslim family, forbid entry to non-Muslims into mosques, and forbid construction of churches, synagogues or temples in their countries.

Relativism, the belief that all religions are equal in their value and that none of the religions give access to absolute truth, is an extreme form of inclusivism. Likewise, syncretism, the attempt to take over creeds of practices from other religions or even to blend practices or creeds from different religions into one new faith is an extreme form of inter-religious dialogue. Syncretism must not be confused with ecumenism, the attempt to bring closer and eventually reunite different denominations of one religion that have a common origin but were separated by a schism.

== History ==
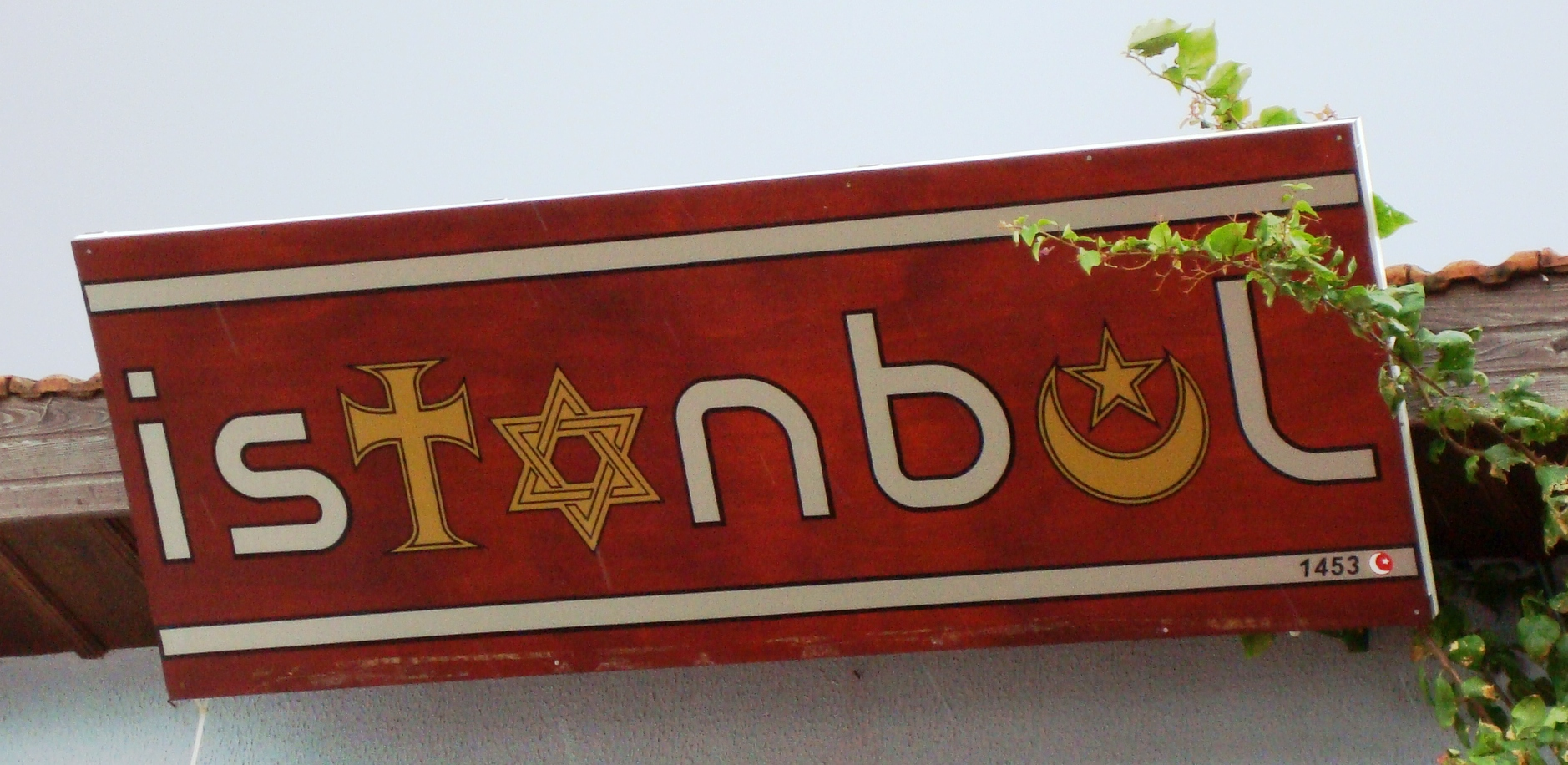
Istanbul text with Abrahamic religions in Turkey

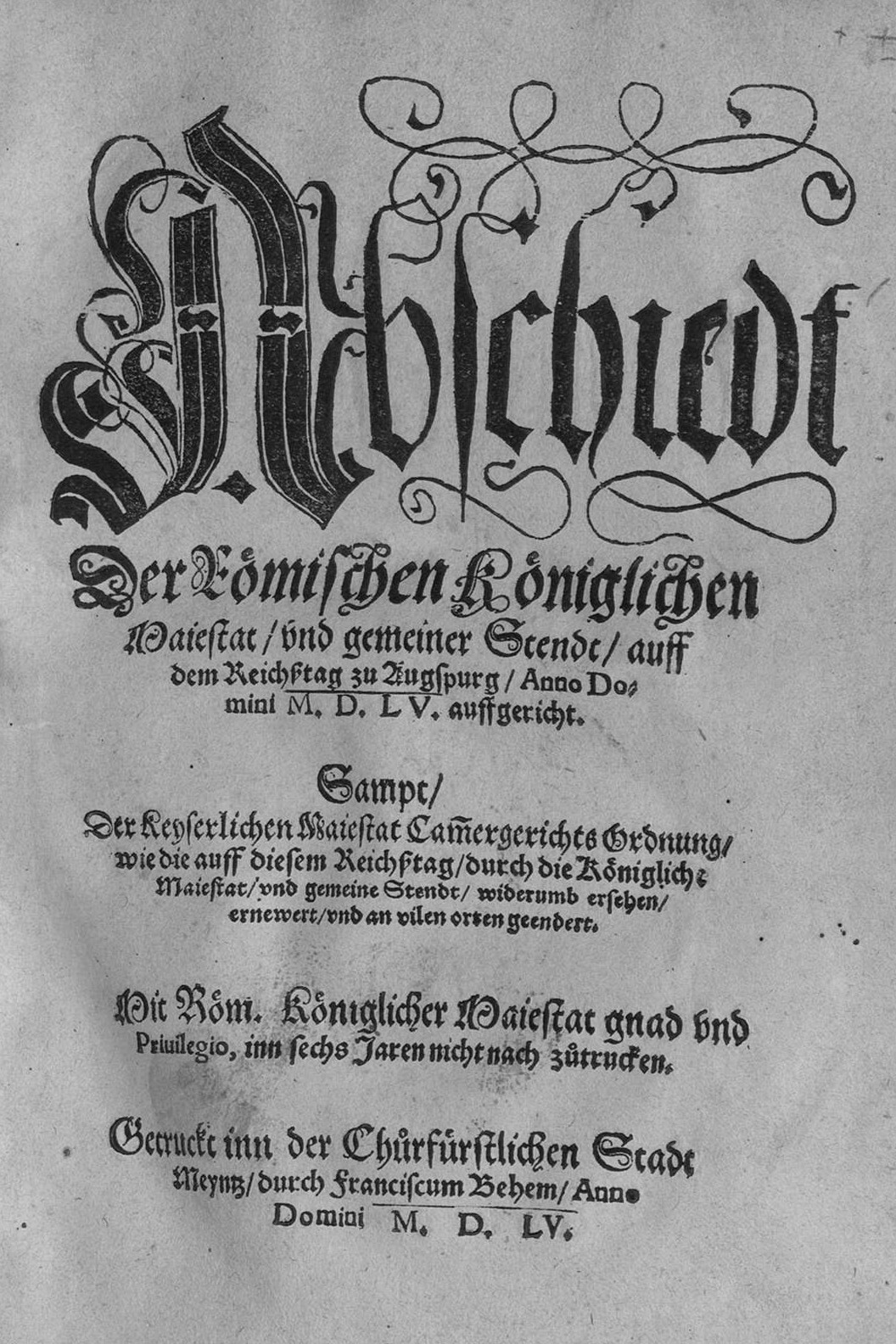
Front page of the 1555 Peace of Augsburg, which recognized two different churches in the Holy Roman Empire

Cultural and religious pluralism has a long history and development that reaches from antiquity to contemporary trends in post-modernity.

German philosophers of religion Ludwig Feuerbach and Ernst Troeltsch concluded that Asian religious traditions, in particular Hinduism and Buddhism, were the earliest proponents of religious pluralism and granting of freedom to the individuals to choose their own faith and develop a personal religious construct within it (see also Relationship between Buddhism and Hinduism); Jainism, another ancient Indian religion, as well as Daoism have also always been inclusively flexible and have long favored religious pluralism for those who disagree with their religious viewpoints. The Age of Enlightenment in Europe triggered a sweeping transformation about religion after the French Revolution (liberalism, democracy, civil and political rights, freedom of thought, separation of Church and State, secularization), with rising acceptance of religious pluralism and decline of Christianity. According to Chad Meister, these pluralist trends in the Western thought, particularly since the 18th century, brought mainstream Christianity and Judaism closer to the Asian traditions of philosophical pluralism and religious tolerance.

== Classical civilization: Greek and Roman religions ==
For the Romans, religion was part of the daily life. Each home had a household shrine at which prayers and libations to the family's domestic deities were offered. Neighborhood shrines and sacred places such as springs and groves dotted the city. The Roman calendar was structured around religious observances; in the Imperial Era, as many as 135 days of the year were devoted to religious festivals and games (ludi). Women, slaves and children all participated in a range of religious activities. Some public rituals could be conducted only by women, and women formed what is perhaps Rome's most famous priesthood, the state-supported Vestal Virgins, who tended Rome's sacred hearth for centuries, until disbanded under Christian persecution and domination.

The Romans are known for the great number of deities they honored. The presence of Greeks on the Italian peninsula from the beginning of the historical period influenced Roman culture, introducing some religious practices that became as fundamental as the cult of Apollo. The Romans looked for common ground between their major gods and those of the Greeks, adapting Greek myths and iconography for Latin literature and Roman art. Etruscan religion was also a major influence, particularly on the practice of augury, since Rome had once been ruled by Etruscan kings.

Mystery religions imported from the Near East (Ptolemaic Egypt, Persia and Mesopotamia), which offered initiates salvation through a personal God and eternal life after the death, were a matter of personal choice for an individual, practiced in addition to carrying on one's family rites and participating in public religion. The mysteries, however, involved exclusive oaths and secrecy, conditions that conservative Romans viewed with suspicion as characteristic of "magic", conspiracy (coniuratio), and subversive activity. Sporadic and sometimes brutal attempts were made to suppress religionists who seemed to threaten traditional Roman morality and unity, as with the Senate's efforts to restrict the Bacchanals in 186 BC.

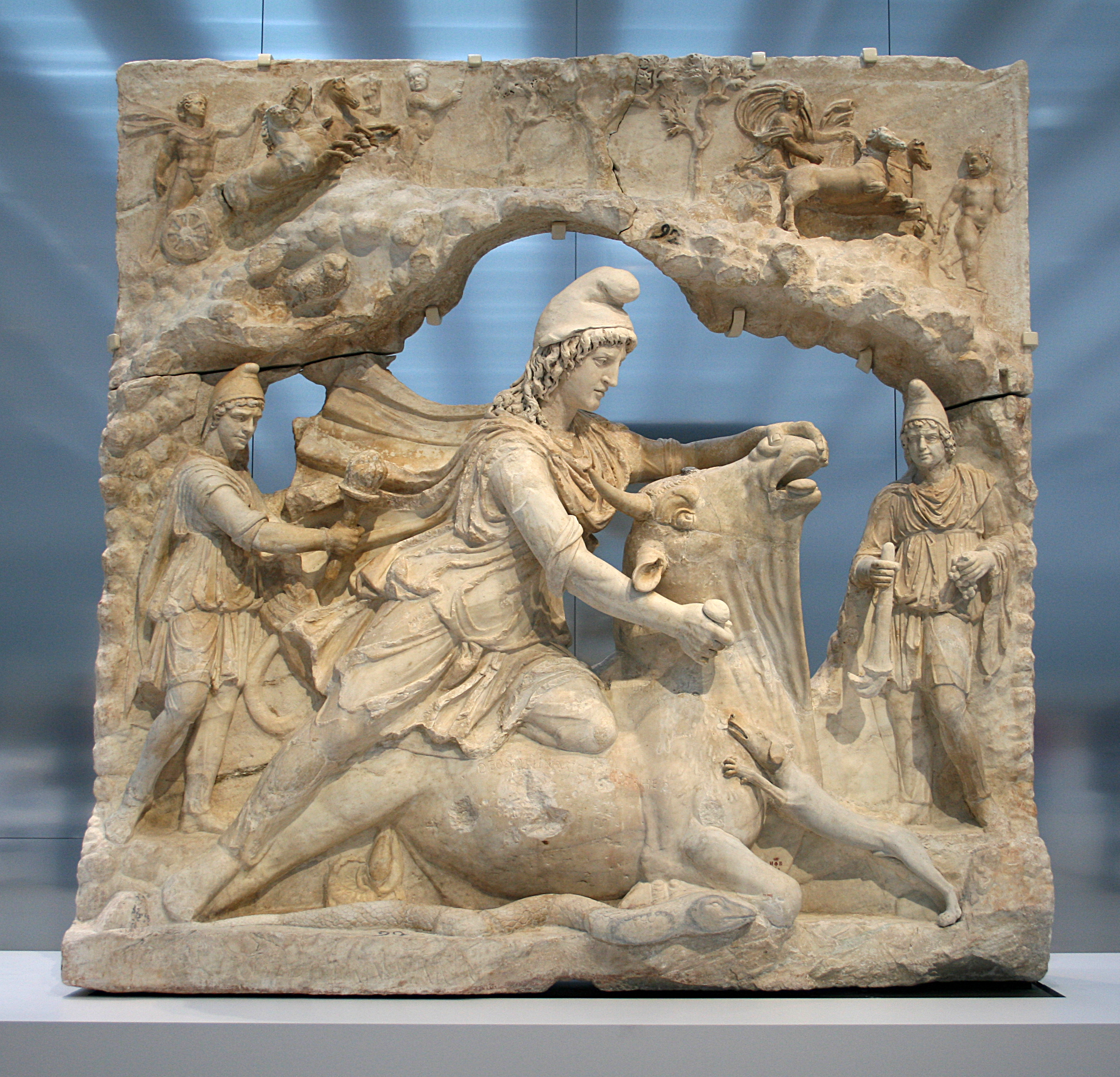
Marble relief of Mithras slaying the bull (2nd century, Louvre-Lens); Mithraism was among the most widespread mystery religions of the Roman Empire.

As the Romans extended their dominance throughout the Mediterranean world, their policy in general was to absorb the deities and cults of other peoples rather than try to eradicate them, since they believed that preserving tradition promoted social stability.

One way that Rome incorporated diverse peoples was by supporting their religious heritage, building temples to local deities that framed their theology within the hierarchy of Roman religion. Inscriptions throughout the Empire record the side-by-side worship of local and Roman deities, including dedications made by Romans to local Gods. By the height of the Empire, numerous international deities were cultivated at Rome and had been carried to even the most remote provinces (among them Cybele, Isis, Osiris, Serapis, Epona), and Gods of solar monism such as Mithras and Sol Invictus, found as far north as Roman Britain. Because Romans had never been obligated to cultivate one deity or one cult only, religious tolerance was not an issue in the sense that it is for competing monotheistic religions. The monotheistic rigor of Judaism posed difficulties for Roman policy that led at times to compromise and the granting of special exemptions, but sometimes to intractable conflict.

== Christianity ==
The Christian cross. A very popular symbol of Christianity.

Some Christians have argued that religious pluralism is an invalid or self-contradictory concept. Other Christians, such as philosopher John Hick argue for a version of pluralism.

Maximal forms of religious pluralism claim that all religions are equally true, or that one religion can be true for some and another for others. Most Christians hold this idea to be logically impossible from the principle of contradiction. The two largest Christian branches, the Catholic Church and the Eastern Orthodox Church, both claim to be the "one true church" and that "outside the true Church there is no salvation"; Protestantism however, which has many different denominations, has no consistent doctrine in this regard, and has a variety of different positions regarding religious pluralism.

Other Christians have held that there can be truth value and salvific value in other faith traditions. John Macquarrie, described in the Handbook of Anglican Theologians (1998) as "unquestionably Anglicanism's most distinguished systematic theologian in the second half of the twentieth century", wrote that "there should be an end to proselytizing but that equally there should be no syncretism of the kind typified by the Baháʼí movement" (p. 2). In discussing nine founders of major faith traditions (Moses, Zoroaster, Lao-zu, Buddha, Confucius, Socrates, Krishna, Jesus, and Muhammad), which he called "mediators between the human and the divine", Macquarrie wrote that:

I do not deny for a moment that the truth of God has reached others through other channels – indeed, I hope and pray that it has. So while I have a special attachment to one mediator, I have respect for them all. (p. 12)

The Church of Jesus Christ of Latter-day Saints also teaches a form of religious pluralism, that there is at least some truth in almost all religions and philosophies.

=== Classical Christian views ===
Before the Great Schism, mainstream Christianity confessed "one holy catholic and apostolic church", in the words of the Nicene Creed. Roman Catholics, Orthodox Christians, Episcopalians and most Protestant Christian denominations still maintain this belief. Furthermore, the Catholic Church makes the claim that it alone is the one and only true Church founded by Jesus Christ, but the Eastern Orthodox and Oriental Orthodox Churches also make this claim in respect to themselves.

Church unity for these groups, as in the past, is something very visible and tangible, and schism was just as serious an offense as heresy. Following the Great Schism, Roman Catholicism sees and recognizes the Orthodox Sacraments as valid but illicit and without canonical jurisdiction. Eastern Orthodoxy does not have the concept of "validity" when applied to Sacraments, but it considers the form of Roman Catholic Sacraments to be acceptable, and there is some recognition of Catholic sacraments among some, but not all, Orthodox. Both generally mutually regard each other as "heterodox" and "schismatic", while continuing to recognize each other as Christian, at least secundum quid (see ecumenicism).

=== Modern Christian views ===
Some other Protestants hold that only believers who believe in certain fundamental doctrines know the true pathway to salvation. The core of this doctrine is that Jesus Christ was a perfect man, is the Son of God and that he died and rose again for the wrongdoing of those who will accept the gift of salvation. They continue to believe in "one" church, an "invisible church" which encompasses different types of Christians in different sects and denominations, believing in certain issues they deem fundamental, while disunited on a variety of doctrines they deem non-fundamental. Some evangelical Protestants are doubtful if Roman Catholics or Eastern Orthodox can possibly be members of this "invisible church", and usually they reject religious (typically restorationist) movements rooted in 19th-century American Christianity, such as Mormonism, Christian Science, or Jehovah's Witnesses as not distinctly Christian.

The Catholic Church, unlike some Protestant denominations, affirms "developmental theology", understood to mean that the "Holy Spirit, in and through the evolving and often confused circumstances of concrete history, is gradually bringing the Church to an ever more mature understanding of the deposit of faith (the saving truths entrusted by Jesus Christ to the Apostles—these as such cannot be changed or added to). The Church comes to recognize baptism of desire quite early in its history. Later, the Church realizes that Romans 2:14–16, for example, allows for the salvation of non-Christians who do not have unobstructed exposure to Christian teachings: "When Gentiles who have not the law do by nature what the law requires.... They show that what the law requires is written on their hearts.... Various forms of "implicit faith" come to hold standing, until at Vatican Council II, the Church declares: "Nor shall divine providence deny the assistance necessary for salvation to those who, without any fault of theirs, have not yet arrived at an explicit knowledge of God, and who, not without grace, strive to lead a good life" (#16). Vatican Council II in its Declaration Nostra aetate addresses the non-Christian religions with respect and appreciation, affirming the goodness found in them. Since Vatican Council II, Catholic dialogists in particular are working out the implications of John Paul II's statement, in Redemptor hominis #6 that Christians should recognize "the Holy Spirit operating outside the visible confines of the Mystical Body of Christ." Among these dialogists, Robert Magliola, an affiliate of the Italian community Vangelo e Zen ("The Gospel and Zen"), Desio and Milano, Italy, who taught in predominantly Buddhist cultures for years, and practiced Buddhist-Catholic dialogue there and in the West, and who is widely published in this dialogue, argues the following:

If God has willed that all persons be saved (see Catechism of the Catholic Church #851, quoting 1 Tim. 2:4) but has not sent the opportunity of Christian conversion to all, how can we not conclude that God wills those good Buddhists in this latter category to live, flourish, and die as good Buddhists? That God in His providence—at least for now—wants Buddhism to be the setting for millions of good and noble people in the world? (This does not mean that Catholics should not witness to the Catholic faith or even—on the proper occasions and in a courteous way—consider it their duty to preach Catholicism to Buddhists, and to teach it mightily. But it does mean that Catholics would do well to remember that God alone sends the grace of conversion when and to whom He wills.)

== Buddhism ==
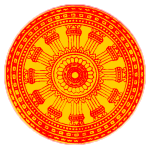
Buddhist dharmachakra, a popular symbol of Buddhism

Buddhist doctrine, fundamentally based upon minimizing or negating the suffering which arises from attachment, like its sister Indic religions, opposes exclusivism and emphasizes pluralism. This is not only encapsulated in the life story of the Buddha, who sought many gurus himself before resolving to seek Enlightenment on his own, but also in Buddhist scripture.

Katunnam kilesasîmânam atîtattâ
Sîmâtigo bâhitapâpattâ ka brâhmano.

What one person, abiding by the (philosophical) views, saying, 'This is the most excellent,' considers the highest in the world, everything different from that he says is wretched, therefore he has not overcome dispute.

— Sutta Nipata, 796

The Buddha also himself stated that truth is compromised when an individual is not open to entertaining a wide array of teachings. Moreover, without a pluralist understanding, the Buddha stated that truth cannot be discovered or ascertained such that it is truly known:

If a person has faith, Bhāradvāja, he preserves truth when he says: 'My faith is thus'; but he does not yet come to the definite conclusion: 'Only this is true, anything else is wrong.' In this way, Bhāradvāja, there is the preservation of truth; in this way he preserves truth; in this way we describe the preservation of truth. But as yet there is no discovery of truth.

— The Buddha, The Pali Canon, Bhikkhu Bodhi. "In the Buddha's Words: An Anthology of Discourses from the Pali Canon"

In the Lankavatara Sutra, the Buddha gave a long treatise on the idea that various expressions of Truth may seem contradictory or boundless, yet they all speak of Truth itself – emphasizing that an Enlightened One both accepts pluralism in that there are many ways to referring to Truth, but rises above it through the understanding that Truth transcends all labels.

In a political sense, the earliest references to Buddhist views on religious pluralism are found in the Edicts of Emperor Ashoka:

All religions should reside everywhere, for all of them desire self-control and purity of heart. Rock Edict Nb. 7 (S. Dhammika)

Contact (between religions) is good. One should listen to and respect the doctrines professed by others. Beloved-of-the-Gods, King Piyadasi, desires that all should be well-learned in the good doctrines of other religions. Rock Edict Nb. 12 (S. Dhammika)

When asked, "Don't all religions teach the same thing? Is it possible to unify them?" the Dalai Lama said:

People from different traditions should keep their own, rather than change. However, some Tibetan may prefer Islam, so he can follow it. Some Spanish prefer Buddhism; so follow it. But think about it carefully. Don't do it for fashion. Some people start Christian, follow Islam, then Buddhism, then nothing.

In the United States I have seen people who embrace Buddhism and change their clothes! Like the New Age. They take something Hindu, something Buddhist, something, something.... That is not healthy.

For individual practitioners, having one truth, one religion, is very important. Several truths, several religions, is contradictory.

I am Buddhist. Therefore, Buddhism is the only truth for me, the only religion. To my Christian friend, Christianity is the only truth, the only religion. To my Muslim friend, [Islam] is the only truth, the only religion. In the meantime, I respect and admire my Christian friend and my Muslim friend. If by unifying you mean mixing, that is impossible; useless.

== Islam ==
The crescent and star, a symbol of the Islamic world

Following a period of fighting lasting around a hundred years before 620 AD which mainly involved Arab and Jewish inhabitants of Medina (then known as Yathrib), religious freedom for Muslims, Jews and pagans was declared by Muhammad in the Constitution of Medina. In early Muslim history (until mid 11th century), most Islamic scholars maintained a level of separation from the state which helped to establish some elements of institutional religious freedom. The Islamic Caliphate later guaranteed religious freedom under the conditions that non-Muslim communities accept dhimmi status and their adult males pay the jizya tax instead of the zakat paid by Muslim citizens. Though Dhimmis were not given the same political rights as Muslims, they nevertheless did enjoy equality under the laws of property, contract, and obligation.

Religious pluralism existed in classical Islamic ethics and Sharia, as the religious laws and courts of other religions, including Christianity, Judaism and Hinduism, were usually accommodated within the Islamic legal framework, as seen in the early Caliphate, Al-Andalus, Indian subcontinent, and the Ottoman Millet system. In medieval Islamic societies, the qadi (Islamic judges) usually could not interfere in the matters of non-Muslims unless the parties voluntarily choose to be judged according to Islamic law, thus the dhimmi communities living in Islamic states usually had their own laws independent from the Sharia law, such as the Jews who would have their own Halakha courts.

Dhimmis were allowed to operate their own courts following their own legal systems in cases that did not involve other religious groups, or capital offences or threats to public order. Non-Muslims were allowed to engage in religious practices that were usually forbidden by Islamic law, such as the consumption of alcohol and pork, as well as religious practices which Muslims found repugnant, such as the Zoroastrian practice of incestuous "self-marriage" where a man could marry his mother, sister or daughter. According to the famous Islamic legal scholar Ibn Qayyim (1292–1350), non-Muslims had the right to engage in such religious practices even if it offended Muslims, under the conditions that such cases not be presented to Islamic Sharia courts and that these religious minorities believed that the practice in question is permissible according to their religion.

Despite Dhimmis enjoying special statuses under the Caliphates, they were not considered equals, and sporadic persecutions of non-Muslim groups did occur in the history of the Caliphates.

The primary sources that guide Islam, namely Quran and Sunnahs, may be interpreted as promoting the fundamental right to practice an individual's belief. However, the acceptability of religious pluralism within Islam remains a topic of active debate, though the vast majority of Islamic scholars and historical evidences reveal Islam's commitment to no coercion in religion, supporting pluralism in the context of relative toleration. Hamed Kazemzadeh, a pluralist orientalist, argues that cultural absolutism of ours is, of course, today under heavy pressure, a double pressure of defining and semi-bankrupt imperialism and surprisingly strong counter assertive challenge that changed the mentality of Muslims to have a pluralist identity. Then he highlights the policy method of Islam Messenger in the early Islamic civilization toward other religions.

In Surah Al-Tawba, verse 29 demands Muslims to fight all those who do not believe in Islam, including Christians and Jews (People of the Book), until they pay the Jizya, a tax, with willing submission.

Fight those who do not believe in Allah and the Last Day, nor comply with what Allah and His Messenger have forbidden, nor embrace the religion of truth from among those who were given the Scripture, until they pay the tax, willingly submitting, fully humbled.

— Surah At-Tawbah 9:29

Some people have concluded from verse 9:29, that Muslims are commanded to attack all non-Muslims until they pay money, but Shaykh Jalal Abualrub writes:

These Ayat (Quranic verses) stress the necessity of fighting against the People of the Scripture, but under what conditions? We previously established the fact that the Islamic State is not permitted to attack non-Muslims who are not hostile to Islam, who do not oppress Muslims, or try to convert Muslims by force from their religion, or expel them from their lands, or wage war against them, or prepare for attacks against them. If any of these offenses occurs, however, Muslims are permitted to defend themselves and protect their religion. Muslims are not permitted to attack non-Muslims who signed peace pacts with them, or non-Muslims who live under the protection of the Islamic State.

— Abualrub, Holy Wars, Crusades, Jihad

In Surah Al-Nisa, verse 89 has been misquoted to seem that it says to slay the apostates. In actuality, it only commands Muslims to fight those who practice oppression or persecution or attack the Muslims.

4:88 Why are you ˹believers˺ divided into two groups regarding the hypocrites while Allah allowed them to regress ˹to disbelief˺ because of their misdeeds? Do you wish to guide those left by Allah to stray? And whoever Allah leaves to stray, you will never find for them a way.
4:89 They wish you would disbelieve as they have disbelieved, so you may all be alike. So do not take them as allies unless they emigrate in the cause of Allah. But if they turn away, then seize them and kill them wherever you find them, and do not take any of them as allies or helpers,
4:90 except those who are allies of a people you are bound with in a treaty or those wholeheartedly opposed to fighting either you or their own people. If Allah had willed, He would have empowered them to fight you. So if they refrain from fighting you and offer you peace, then Allah does not permit you to harm them.
4:91 You will find others who wish to be safe from you and their own people. Yet they cannot resist the temptation ˹of disbelief or hostility˺. If they do not keep away, offer you peace, or refrain from attacking you, then seize them and kill them wherever you find them. We have given you full permission over such people.

— Surah An-Nisa 4:88-91

=== Sufism ===
Sufis are practitioners of the mystical tradition of Islam. Sufis such as Rumi and Abu Sa'id Abu'l-Khayr have been associated with religious pluralism or tolerant views toward religious others. Not all Sufis hold pluralist or tolerant views of other religions; Gregory A. Lipton argues that Ibn Arabi held exclusivist views on Islam and other religions, against pluralist readers of Ibn Arabi such as Frithjof Schuon.

=== Ahmadiyya ===
Ahmadis recognize many founders of world religions to be from God, who all brought teaching and guidance from God to all peoples. According to the Ahmadiyya understanding of the Quran, every nation in the history of mankind has been sent a prophet, as the Quran states: And there is a guide for every people. Though the Quran mentions only 24 prophets, the founder of Islam, Muhammad states that the world has seen 124,000 prophets. Thus other than the prophets mentioned in the Quran, Ahmadis, with support from theological study also recognize Buddha, Krishna, founders of Chinese religions to be divinely appointed individuals.

The Second Khalifatul Maish of the Ahmadiyya Muslim Community writes: "According to this teaching there has not been a single people at any time in history or anywhere in the world who have not had a warner from God, a teacher, a prophet. According to the Quran there have been prophets at all times and in all countries. India, China, Russia, Afghanistan, parts of Africa, Europe, America—all had prophets according to the theory of divine guidance taught by the Quran. When, therefore, Muslims hear about prophets of other peoples or other countries, they do not deny them. They do not brand them as liars. Muslims believe that other peoples have had their teachers. If other peoples have had prophets, books, and laws, these constitute no difficulty for Islam."

Mirza Ghulam Ahmad, founder of the Ahmadiyya Muslim Community wrote in his book A Message of Peace: "Our God has never discriminated between one people and another. This is illustrated by the fact that all the potentials and capabilities (Prophets) which have been granted to the Aryans (Hindus) have also been granted to the races inhabiting Arabia, Persia, Syria, China, Japan, Europe and America."

=== In modern practice ===
Religious pluralism is a contested issue in modern Islamic countries. Twenty-three Islamic countries have laws, as of 2014, which make it a crime, punishable with death penalty or prison, for a Muslim, by birth or conversion, to leave Islam or convert to another religion. In Muslim countries such as Algeria, it is illegal to preach, persuade or attempt to convert a Muslim to another religion. Saudi Arabia and several Islamic nations have strict laws against the construction of Christian churches, Jewish synagogues, Hindu temples and Buddhist stupas anywhere inside the country, by anyone including minorities working there. Brunei in southeast Asia adopted Sharia law in 2013 that prescribes a death penalty for any Muslim who converts from Islam to another religion. Other Islamic scholars state Sharia does not allow non-Muslim minorities to enjoy religious freedoms in a Muslim-majority nation, but other scholars disagree.

The Islamic Republic of Pakistan is a multi-racial and multi-religious nation, where Muslims form the majority. Residents of Pakistan follow many of the major religions. Pakistan's diverse cultural and religious heritage is part of its multicultural history, but there is a lack of tolerance towards religious minorities in Pakistan. Minorities are facing exploitation by extremist groups, and some sections of the society show hatred towards them, religious minorities are not allowed to join the mainstream of the society because of their religion.

== Jainism ==
Anekāntavāda, the principle of relative pluralism, is one of the basic principles of Jainism. In this view, the truth or the reality is perceived differently from different points of view, and no single point of view is the complete truth. Jain doctrine states that an object has infinite modes of existence and qualities and they cannot be completely perceived in all its aspects and manifestations, due to inherent limitations of the humans. Only the Kevalins—the omniscient beings—can comprehend the object in all its aspects and manifestations, and all others are capable of knowing only a part of it. Consequently, no one view can claim to represent the absolute truth—only relative truths. Jains compare all attempts to proclaim absolute truth with andhgajnyaya or the "maxim of the blind men and elephant", wherein all the blind men claimed to explain the true appearance of the elephant, but could only partly succeed due to their narrow perspective. For Jains, the problem with the blind men is not that they claim to explain the true appearance of the elephant; the problem is doing so to the exclusion of all other claims. Since absolute truth is many-sided, embracing any truth to the exclusion of others is to commit the error of ekānta (one-sidedness). Openness to the truths of others is one way in which Jainism embodies religious pluralism.

== Sikhism ==
The Sikh gurus have propagated the message of "many paths" leading to the one God and ultimate salvation for all souls who treading on the path of righteousness. They have supported the view that proponents of all faiths, by doing good and virtuous deeds and by remembering the Lord, can certainly achieve salvation. Sikhs are told to accept all leading faiths as possible vehicles for attaining spiritual enlightenment, provided the faithful study, ponder and practice the teachings of their prophets and leaders. Sikhism had many interactions with Sufism as well as Hinduism, influenced them and was influenced by them.

The Sri Guru Granth Sahib, the holy book of the Sikhs, says:

Do not say that the Vedas, the Bible and the Koran are false. Those who do not contemplate them are false.

— Guru Granth Sahib page 1350

As well as:

Some call the Lord "Ram, Ram", and some "Khuda". Some serve Him as "Gusain", others as "Allah". He is the Cause of causes, and Generous. He showers His Grace and Mercy upon us. Some pilgrims bathe at sacred shrines, others go on Hajj to Mecca. Some do devotional worship, whilst others bow their heads in prayer. Some read the Vedas, and some the Koran. Some wear blue robes, and some wear white. Some call themselves Muslim, and some call themselves Hindu. Some yearn for paradise, and others long for heaven. Says Nanak, one who realizes the Hukam of God's Will, knows the secrets of his Lord Master. (Sri Guru Granth Sahib, page 885)

One who recognizes that all spiritual paths lead to the One shall be emancipated. One who speaks lies shall fall into hell and burn. In all the world, the most blessed and sanctified are those who remain absorbed in Truth. (SGGS Ang 142)

The seconds, minutes, and hours, days, weeks and months and various seasons originate from One Sun; O nanak, in just the same way, the many forms originate from the Creator. (Guru Granth Sahib page 12,13)

The Guru Granth Sahib also says that Bhagat Namdev and Bhagat Kabir, who were both believed to be Hindus, both attained salvation though they were born before Sikhism took root and were clearly not Sikhs. This highlights and reinforces the Guru's saying that "peoples of other faiths" can join with God as true and also at the same time signify that Sikhism is not the exclusive path for liberation.

Additionally the Guru Granth Sahib says:

First, Allah (God) created the Light; then, by His Creative Power, He made all mortal beings. From the One Light, the entire universe welled up. So who is good, and who is bad? ||1||

Again, the Guru Granth Sahib Ji provides this verse:

Naam Dayv the printer, and Kabeer the weaver, obtained salvation through the Perfect Guru. Those who know God and recognize His Shabad ("word") lose their ego and class consciousness. (Guru Granth Sahib page 67)

Most of the 15 Sikh Bhagats who are mentioned in their holy book were non-Sikhs and belonged to Hindu and Muslim faiths, which were the most prevalent religions of this region.

The pluralistic dialogue of Sikhism began with the founder of Sikhism Guru Nanak after becoming enlightened saying the words Na koi hindu na koi musalman – "There is no Hindu, there is no Muslim". He recognised that religious labels held no value and it is the deeds of human that will be judged in the hereafter what we call ourselves religiously holds no value.

Sikhs have been considered eager exponents of interfaith dialogue and not only accept the right of others to practice their faith but have in the past fought and laid down their lives to protect this right for others; the Martyrdom of Guru Tegh Bahadar, who on the pleas of a pandit of the Kashmiris, agreed to fight against a tyrannic Moghul Empire (that was forcing them to convert to Islam) in order that they might gain the freedom to practice their religion, which differed from his own.

== Baháʼí Faith ==
Bahá'u'lláh, founder of Baháʼí Faith, a religion that developed in Persia, having roots in Islam, urged the elimination of religious intolerance. He taught that God is one, and religion has been progressively revealed over time through Manifestations of God, the founders of religion. Bahá'u'lláh taught that Baháʼís must associate with peoples of all religions, whether this is reciprocated or not.

Baháʼís refer to this concept as Progressive revelation, meaning that each religion brings a more advanced understanding of divinity and updated social laws as mankind matures. In this view, God's word is revealed through a series of messengers: Abraham, Krishna, Moses, Buddha, Jesus, Muhammad, Báb and Bahá'u'lláh (the founder of the Baháʼí Faith) among them. According to Baháʼí writings, there will not be another messenger for many hundreds of years.

There is also a respect for the religious traditions of the native peoples of the planet who may have little other than oral traditions as a record of their religious figures.

== Religious pluralism and human service professions ==
The concept of religious pluralism is also relevant to human service professions, such as psychology and social work, as well as medicine and nursing, in which trained professionals may interact with clients from diverse faith traditions. For example, psychologist Kenneth Pargament has described four possible stances toward client religious and spiritual beliefs, which he called rejectionist, exclusivist, constructivist, and pluralist. Unlike the constructivist stance, the pluralist stance:

... recognizes the existence of a religious or spiritual absolute reality but allows for multiple interpretations and paths toward it. In contrast to the exclusivist who maintains that there is a single path "up the mountain of God", the pluralist recognizes many paths as valid. Although both the exclusivist and the pluralist may agree on the existence of religious or spiritual reality, the pluralist recognizes that this reality is expressed in different cultures and by different people in different ways. Because humans are mortal and limited, a single human religious system cannot encompass all of the religious or spiritual absolute reality.... (p. 167)

— Zinnbauer Pargament 2000

Importantly, "the pluralistic therapist can hold personal religious beliefs while appreciating those of a client with different religious beliefs. The pluralist recognizes that religious value differences can and will exist between counselors and clients without adversely affecting therapy" (p. 168). The stances implied by these four helping orientations on several key issues, such as "should religious issues be discussed in counseling?", have also been presented in tabular form (p. 362, Table 12.1).

The profession of chaplaincy, a religious profession, must also deal with issues of pluralism and the relevance of a pluralistic stance. For example, Friberg argues: "With growing populations of immigrants and adherents of religions not previously seen in significant numbers in North America, spiritual care must take religion and diversity seriously. Utmost respect for the residents' spiritual and religious histories and orientations is imperative" (p. 182).

== Skepticism ==
=== Argument from inconsistent revelations ===
The argument from inconsistent revelations is an argument that aims to show that one cannot choose one religion over another since their revelations are inconsistent with each other and that any two religions cannot both be true. The argument appears, among other places, in Voltaire's 1759 Candide and 1764 Philosophical Dictionary. Related arguments from interreligious disagreement usually appeal to the assumption that God would not reveal God's self in varying ways and especially not through the distinct, highly specific doctrines and moral commands found in major religious traditions. Yet such arguments often neglect to compare the core commitments such religion have in common, namely their interreligious agreements, which might itself lend itself to supporting a broad theism or supernaturalism, over against atheism or agnosticism (see discussion by John Hick and Matthew Benton.)

== Religion and globalization in the digital age ==
The 21st century has seen a profound transformation in the religious landscape due to globalization and digital technologies. These forces have intensified connections across geographic, cultural, and ideological boundaries, significantly reshaping religious identities, expressions, and institutions. Scholars have examined this evolving context through themes such as religious pluralism, digital religion, hybrid identities, migration, secular governance, and commodification of spirituality.

=== Globalization and religious pluralism ===
Globalization has enabled religions and their practitioners to interact closely despite geographical distances. Advances in communication technologies and increased mobility have compressed the world into “a single place,” fostering awareness and accessibility of diverse faiths. This interconnectedness promotes human rights norms, such as religious freedom, empowering individuals to express their beliefs and allowing religious communities to engage more openly in public life.

Transnational religious networks and diasporic communities flourish under globalization, enriching internal religious diversity and facilitating interfaith dialogue aimed at shared ethical frameworks. Yet, globalization also presents challenges. Secular consumerist values may erode traditional identities, prompting defensive fundamentalist movements and inter-religious tensions. Furthermore, increased visibility of multiple faiths in the public sphere can generate competition between religious groups in pluralistic societies.

=== Digital religion ===
The emergence of “digital religion” refers to religious practice, identity, and community formation within digital environments. It encompasses both traditional institutions adapting to online platforms and new religious movements native to cyberspace. Originating in the mid-1990s, early studies examined online forums where users shared prayers and theological discussions. Scholars quickly debated whether digital expressions of religion represented authentic spirituality or superficial simulations.

By the early 2000s, research expanded to explore how digital spaces reshape rituals, authority, and religious identity. Communities emerged on websites and social media, offering interactive, immersive religious experiences. One notable example is the Church of Fools, launched in 2004, which enables users to participate in services through avatars. Such digital contexts allow for experimentation with religious roles and beliefs, particularly for those excluded from traditional hierarchies.

Digital religion challenges conventional structures by decentralizing spiritual authority and encouraging peer-to-peer spiritual exchange. Participants can construct personalized expressions of belief through online profiles and interactions. However, debates persist regarding the theological legitimacy of exclusively online religious practices and their influence on offline traditions.

=== Hybrid religious identities ===
Globalization has also facilitated the formation of hybrid religious identities. These identities combine elements from diverse traditions, enabled by the free circulation of beliefs through digital and global networks. New religious movements often originate on the margins of established religions, drawing on eclectic influences such as Eastern spirituality, New Age philosophy, and even scientific discourse.

This syncretism results in unique combinations—e.g., blending Jewish Kabbalah with transcendental meditation or fusing shamanism with quantum theory. Such hybridity reflects a shift toward subjectivity, autonomy, and conceptual fluidity in spiritual meaning-making. These hybrid forms signify an adaptive response to the complexities of modern life, where the sacred and secular frequently intersect.

=== Migration, religious pluralism, and the secular state ===
Migration is a key vector of religious pluralism in contemporary societies. As people move across borders, they bring diverse religious traditions that challenge and enrich host cultures. For instance, migration to Europe from Muslim-majority countries has expanded the region’s religious diversity, prompting debates about cultural identity, secularism, and integration.

Diasporic communities—such as Sikhs in Canada or Hindus in the UK—establish institutions that transform the cultural landscape, fostering new models of pluralism. In secular states, the coexistence of various faiths demands policy frameworks that balance civic unity with religious freedoms. Tensions often arise when public expressions of faith (e.g., religious attire) intersect with secular norms, illustrating the delicate negotiation required in pluralistic democracies.

=== Commodification of religion and the New Age movement ===
Global consumer culture has extended into the realm of spirituality, giving rise to the commodification of religion. Traditional religious symbols, rituals, and philosophies are increasingly repackaged as products promising wellness, personal growth, and aesthetic pleasure. This trend reflects broader societal values centered on immediacy and self-optimization.

The New Age movement exemplifies this commodification. Practices such as energy healing, holistic retreats, and the use of “positive energy” objects are often stripped from their spiritual roots and marketed for consumption. Scholars like Bernardo Nante argue that this process reduces profound spiritual traditions to superficial lifestyle accessories. The commercialization of spirituality raises concerns about authenticity and the dilution of religious meaning.

== See also ==
- Category:Catholic ecumenical and interfaith relations
- Comparative religion
- Freedom of religion
- Gamaliel's principle
- Global Centre for Pluralism
- Indifferentism
- Interreligious organization
- Institute for Interreligious Dialogue
- Multiconfessionalism
- Multifaith space
- Paradox of tolerance
- Perennial philosophy
- Pontifical Council for Interreligious Dialogue
- Pontifical Council for Promoting Christian Unity
- Progressive Christianity
- Projects working for peace among Israelis and Arabs
- Religious exclusivism
- Religious harmony in India
- Religious liberalism
- Unitarian Universalism
- United Religions Initiative
- Universalism
- World Council of Churches
- The New Message from God
