= Missy BK =

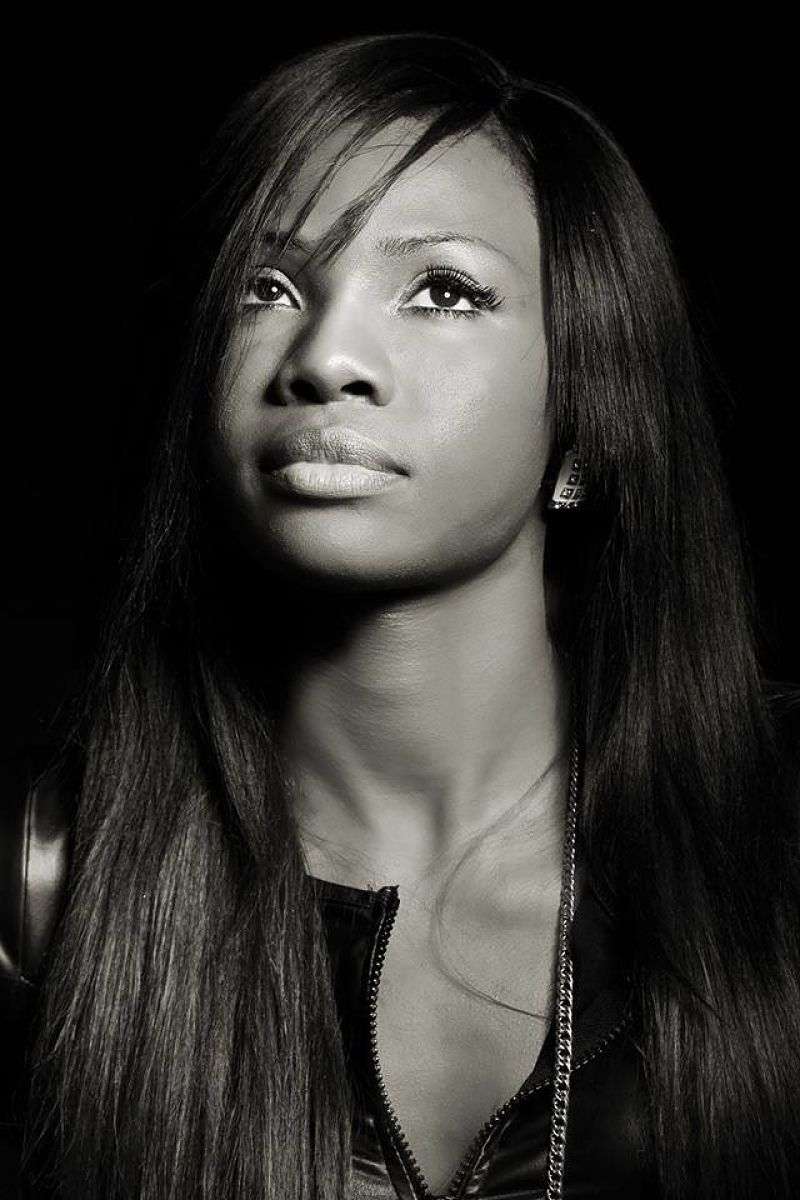
- Missy BK black putting on a black leather jacket.

Background information
- Also known as: Missy BK
- Born: Constance Bih Kimal; May 31, 1986 (age 40); Bamenda, Cameroon
- Occupations: Singer, speaker, Career & Business Consultant
- Website: www.missybkofficial.com

Constance Bih Kimal (born 31 May 1986, better known by her stage name Missy BK) is a Cameroonian and Canadian singer, speaker, career & business consultant. She is best known for her humanitarian work and her first major song my baby which won 5 major international awards in USA, Canada and UK. Missy BK is credited among the Best female Afro pop voices from Cameroon.

She even landed a nomination at the prestigious African Award Afrima in Nigeria for the best female Artist in Central Africa in 2016. Missy is also the first female artist from Cameroon to have signed the Golden book of Montreal, Canada in 2017. Her humanitarian and artistic work was also published in the house of Honor in Montreal Québec Canada in 2017. In 2017, Missy made the list of top 100 black women to watch in Canada.

In 2016, Missy released her first solo album titled Confessions. In 2017, she received a certificate of recognition from the US House of Representatives in New Jersey in recognition of the positive changes made to and impact she has created in her community.

== Biography ==
Missy grew up in Bamenda, Cameroon in a middle-class family. She studied at the University of Yaoundé. During her secondary and university studies, Missy began castings in many Camer music and theater projects. She recorded jingles for radios such as Abakwa Fm, CRTV Radio and Afrique Nouvelle. Missy has opened concerts for multiple music bands and artists such as Davido, Bracket, Meiway, Nkotti Francoise and more. Her song Mama I Love You from album Women for Women also featured other female artists such as Flora, Lady B, Danielle Eog, Meduza, Rosen and Mafe. The album was produced by KVN Productions and released on 8 March 2013 on International Women's Day.

== Early childhood ==
A child of the 80s born in the sunny city of Bamenda, Cameroon, Missy Announced to her parents at the age of 6 that she will be a singer when she grows up. The pop music radios of the 90s carried a heavy dose of rnb, pop and soul music and Missy gravitated to that sound. Although her roots are firmly placed in the mainstream of Gospel songs, She draws inspiration from singers such Whitney Houston, Zahra, Tony Braxton, Annie Anzouer, Charlotte Depanda and different lyrical influences.

== Career ==
Missy started her career at the age of 16 as a radio personality. She animated short radio programs such as Bed Time Stories for Abakwa FM and Afrique Nouvelle FM. At the age of 17, Missy started to record jingles for CRTV Bamenda, Abakwa FM and Afrique Nouvelle FM. That same year Missy joined a girl band named The Cherubic Queens as the lead singer.

Missy released her first single Set Me Free as a solo artist in 2012 and My Baby featuring Annie Anzouer in 2014. For her single Set Me Free Missy won the award for Best Female Artist at HNSS Excellence award in Canada, Montreal. Missy has appeared on cover of the magazines such as Le Montréal Africaine, 100% jeune, La Tribune St Laurent and also got interviewed on BBC's African music show C’est le Moment.

== Philanthropy ==
In 2014, Missy founded Missy BK Foundation to help young Cameroon children. The foundation partners with local communities, orphanages and educators in Cameroon to identify financially challenged children who are eager to learn and help them. This foundation provides educational support to these children through merit-based scholarships, tuition fees, food and learning materials.

Missy BK’s mother is an important inspiration for her philanthropy. According to Missy, “My mother taught me, I don’t have to wait until I have millions to start helping people, she told me it’s not how much I give but it’s the love that I put into what I give that matters and a little something given to someone could make a big difference in their lives.”

The foundation serves Cameroonian children through education sponsorship, supplies for schools and Make-A-Wish program.

== Awards and nominations ==
Year	Award	Category	Result
2013	HNSS Excellence Award Canada	Best Female Artist of the Year	Won
2013	Cameroon Academy Awards	Best Female Act	Nominated
2013	Cameroon Academy Awards	Best video	Nominated
2013	African Entertainment Awards Canada	Best Female Artist of the Year	Nominated
2015	Next Generation Awards USA	Best Female Artist	Nominated
2015	Next Generation Awards USA	Best Video	Nominated
2015	Next Generation Awards USA	Humanitarian act	Nominated
2015	Cameroon Career women’s Award UK	Best Female Act	Nominated
2015	Cameroon Career women’s Award UK	Humanitarian Act	Won
2015	African Entertainment Awards Canada	The African Entertainment Award	Won
2015	Afrima nomination	Best female artist	Nominated
2017	Signs the golden book of Montreal	The Golden Book of Montreal	Signed
2017	Selected top 100 black Woman to watch	Top 100 Black Women To Watch	Selected

== Discography ==
=== Singles ===
- Set Me Free, 2012
- Mama I love you, 2013
- My Baby, 2014
- My Baby (remix) feat Annie Anzouer, 2014
- Ndolo feat iSH, 2015

=== Albums ===
- Confessions
- Women for Women (femmes-exceptionnelles), 2013
