= Interfaith relations in Kazan =

Religion in Kazan (2024)
1. Islam (52.5%)
2. Orthodox (43.0%)
3. Other Christian (2.00%)
4. Judaism (1.00%)
5. Other religions and non-religious individuals (1.50%)

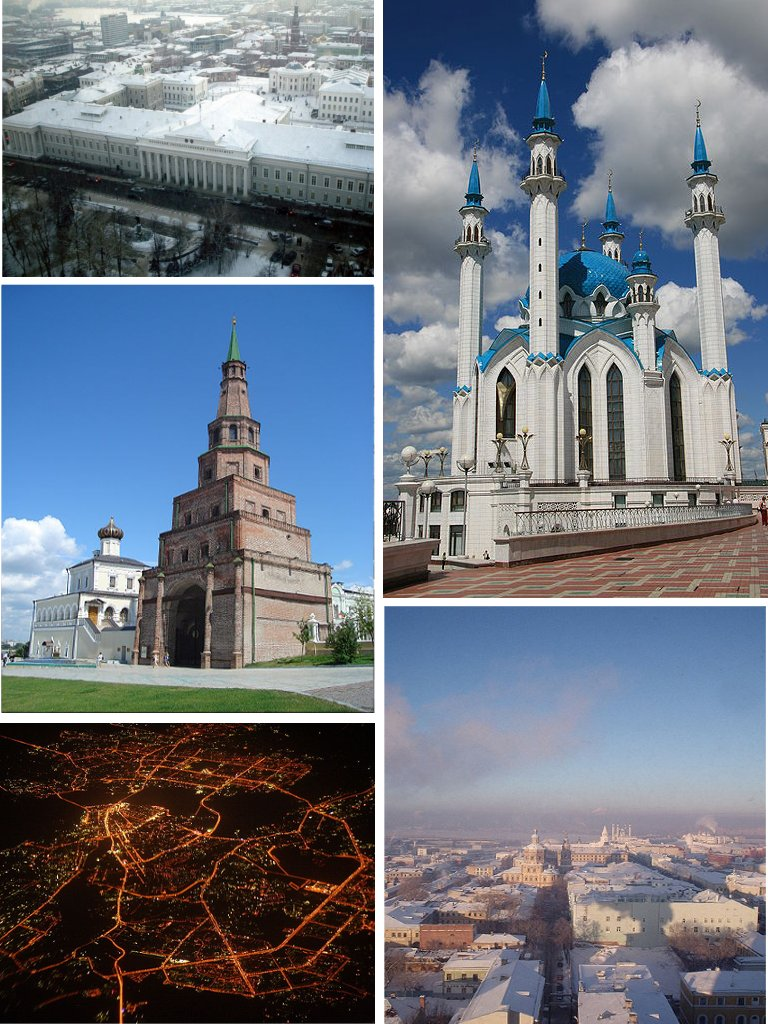
The architectural identity of Kazan reflects its interfaith background.

Interfaith relations in Kazan describe the status of the two major religious groups that inhabit the capital city of Kazan, Tatarstan, in Russia. This region is populated by roughly even numbers of ethnic Tatars (48% to 55%), whose primary cultural religion is Sunni Islam, and ethnic Russians (40% to 46%), whose primary cultural religion is Eastern Orthodox Christianity.

This relationship is notable because it serves as major case study in successful interfaith cooperation, particularly between Muslim and Christian peoples. As a city, Kazan has established several mechanisms of sociopolitical regulation including bordering processes, political cooperation, and social openness.

== Historical background ==
Kazan is located at the confluence of the Volga and Kama rivers. The region of Tatarstan became Islamic in the year 922, and thus its Islamic history stretches back further historically than its Orthodox presence which was at one time viewed as the religious influence of conquerors.

The region developed with relative prosperity at the time of the takeover of the Kazan Khanate. Following the period of Kazan's 1552 defeat by Moscow, periods of forced Christianization occurred. The efforts of Russian nation-building changed the discourse of Kazan into one of primarily Orthodox hegemony.

Then, for much of the twentieth century, forced atheism characterized the religious space in Kazan. This was influenced by the political discourses of the Soviet Union and the modernization efforts undertaken to shift attention away from religious bounds and towards a centralized national identity. By the end of the Soviet period, Tatarstan was one of the most industrially advanced parts of the country.

In the early 1900s, approximately 200,000 people lived in Kazan and only around 30,000 of that population was Tatar. A hundred years later, Kazan's population is over 1 million with an equal ethnic split, following the common pattern of Soviet demographic shift and rapid urbanization.

== Political institutions ==
Kazan is the capital of the Republic of Tatarstan which is a federal subject of the Russian Federation. Kazan is known as the “Third Capital” of Russia. It has achieved large wealth from oil and is therefore more financially independent from Moscow than nearby republics, in addition to its political power-sharing agreements with the Kremlin.

One of the political institutions in Kazan are the discursive definitions of “in–out” groups that determine the social construction of identity. The sociopolitical boundaries enacted into the political narrative of the territory of Kazan helped ascertain its autonomy and identity as 'historically wronged'—yet deeply similar in proximity both physically and psychologically to Russia. This both stabilizes the political strength of Tatars within Tatarstan while aligning ethnic Russians more closely to Tatars than to Volga Russians who are their ethnic counterparts.

Tatarstan's government publications aim to stress the common territory and culture of those who have formed the 'native land' and have lived a specific lifestyle. The unifying discourse of in Tatar public messaging is one of the political institutions that has served to create inclusive yet distinct urban environments in Kazan. Political focuses have been the protection, cohesion, and solidarity of the cultural identity of Tatarstan and proffering religious symbols from both major religious groups.

The multi-ethnic nature of modern Russia has been characterized by growth of nationalism and migration from neighboring areas. The system of federalism marks the ways in which Tatarstan interacts with the federal government while maintaining the ability to manage many internal affairs as 'Tatar'. The 1991 negotiation between Moscow and Kazan resulted in the Treaty on Delimiting the Jurisdictions and Mutual Transmissions of Authorities Between the Organs of State Power of the Russian Federation and the Republic of Tatarstan. These agreements involved several regulatory relations regarding trade, finance, and defense.

Known as the 'Tatarstan model', this experience of positive negotiations between a central government and a subnational region are regarded as a basis for the strength of interfaith and interethnic relations in the modern context and a rarity particularly among post-Soviet states. Kazan's success can be attributed to the political stability, multi-leveled nature of treaties, and pressures of Tatar citizens to develop a working cooperative framework within the Russian Federation indicated movement towards independent but integrated political institutions in the region.

As in its establishment of internal affairs regarding Muslim and Christian freedom to worship, politically, this Tatarstan-Russian Treaty settled roots of conflict with Moscow and developed on the paradox of both decentralized power and the strive towards respecting the heritage of the former-Soviet central government.

=== Language use ===
Tatarstan is a dual-language environment that expresses both Tatar and Russian identity through the political institutions of official language policy. Street signs are one important marker of this in Kazan. In the 1990s, legislation passed ensuring the official status of both Russian and Tatar which led to the creation of bilingual street signs.

The Tatar language is a Turkic language closely related to Turkish and Azeri (although it is more closely related to Kazakh and Kyrgyz) while the Russian language is a Slavic language more closely related to Ukrainian, Belarusian, and others. Around a decade after the creation of Tatar official language status, the decision was made to introduce the Latin alphabet in the urban environment of Kazan, which served to change the optics of Tatar more to that of other Turkic languages as well as European languages.

The selection of official script is often employed in sociolinguistics for societies to indicate political alignments towards a certain hegemonic tradition or culture. However, this choice showed little of the 'walling'-type demarcation against prior scripts that is found in many other bilingual environments. Instead, this choice is a more invisible spatial–political pattern that has not threatened cooperative relations. Given the importance of script both in political, religious, and personal domains, Tatar's changes with Latin indicated a certain relationship bound with former Cyrillic-dominated and thus Russian-dominated sociolinguistic realities.

== Social attitudes ==
Social attitudes in Kazan on an interfaith level also indicate a high level of cooperation. Studies of the youth of Tatarstan indicate current attitudes about the interfaith relations of are generally stable as many of the conflictogenic factors, such as resentments towards other nationalities or xenophobic tendencies, are largely absent in surveys.

An 84% majority of youth in Tatarstan indicated in a 2016 study that nationality was not a determining factor in communicating with other people and that the government has a crucial role in maintaining peaceful relations both internationally and within Tatarstan. Over 50% of the respondents feel the proximity of different nationalities is a benefit and would like to learn more about the customs of other groups.

These results from a student population at Kazan Federal University sample the attitudes that are held at the level of the education system and at a household-level in terms of respect for difference in an ethnoreligious sense. While the younger population does show elements of slippage towards ethnic nationalism for example in social media circles, generally it is found that this population—which is engaged in building the current intellectual discourse around the city—hold a positive or ambivalent view of interethnic relations.

== Conflict avoidance mechanisms ==
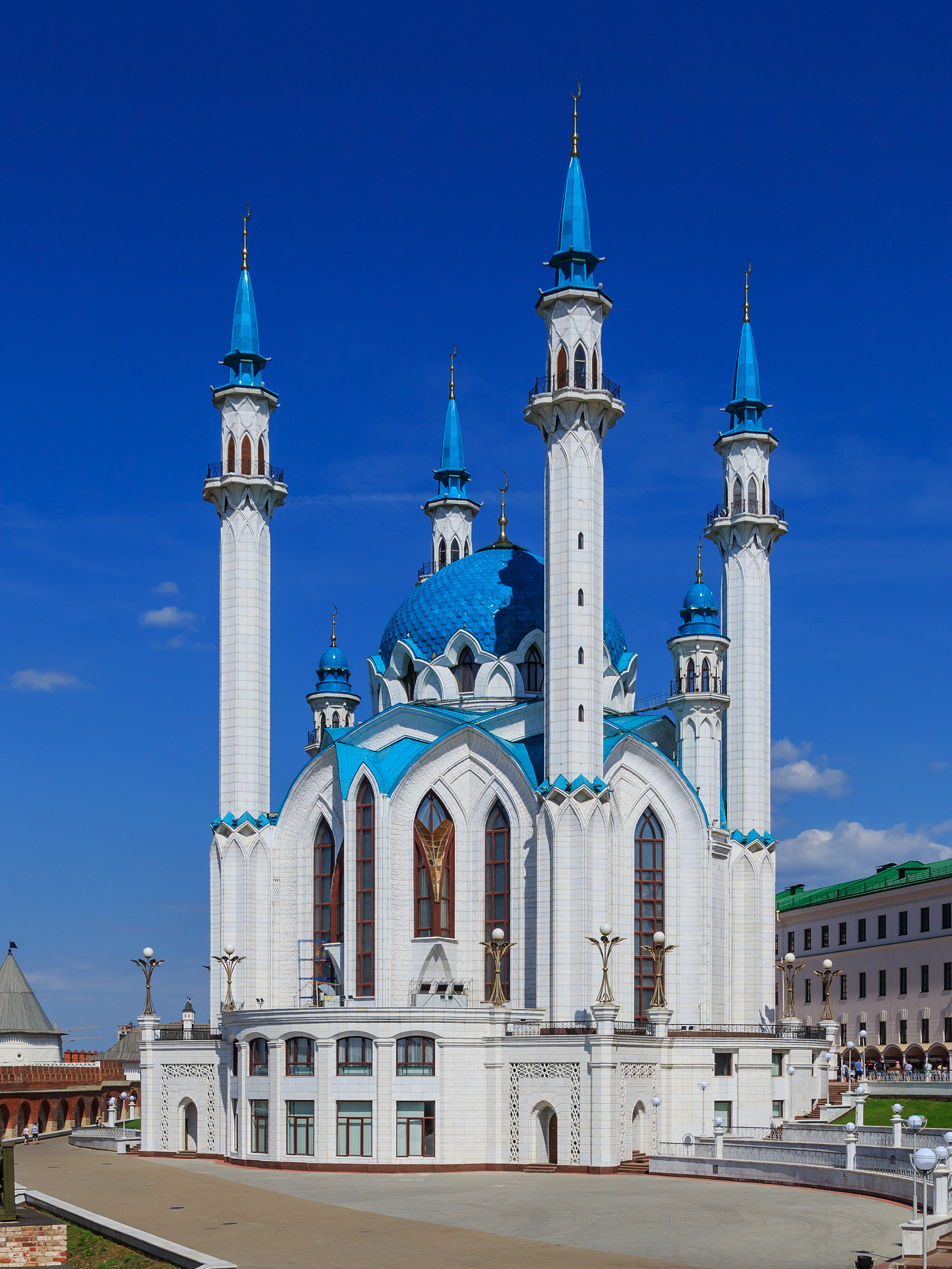
The Qolsharif Mosque in the Kazan Kremlin

Interfaith relations in Kazan operate under several key conflict-avoidance mechanisms. Socio-spatial borders are constructed in Tatarstan through the use of narratives and symbols that constitute a 'bordering process' and establishes a sense of place for both ethnic Tatars and Russians. These borders provide a framework for understanding the mechanisms through which Tatarstan has been successful in mitigating strife.

The notion that religious narratives and symbols are not immutable—that is, they are able to evolve and change within new political realities—helps account for the relative non-divisiveness of the religious worlds of Kazan. The reinterpretation of these symbols, such as in architecture, language, and family life, has happened as Kazan political leaders initiated bridging efforts between Muslim Tatars and Christian Russians which prevented any bases of resentments from manifesting into larger-scale conflict.

Tatars have used Islamic religious symbols to ascertain a special status within the Russian federative framework and within Tatarstan as an ethnic homeland identity. The Soviet system of ethnic federalism called for titular ethnic groups to enjoy special privileges in their territories and post-Soviet Tatarstan has employed the use of Islamic representations to continue to legitimize the public space of Tatar. Likewise, Soviet Orthodox symbolism is present in the city which sustains the long tradition of ethnic Russian religious practice.

Interfaith relations are also seen through the construction of key architectural pieces that establish either Tatar Islamic or Russian Orthodox presence, such as in the construction of Qolsharif Mosque inside of the Kazan Kremlin. Rather than seeing this as an accosting of Russian power, the Kazan environment recognizes this with a sense of normalcy and status-quo to the interfaith peace. Concurrent with this project, the Tatar government ordered the refurbishment of the Cathedral of the Annunciation. This act signified both the reaffirmation of Tatar statehood as well as the respect of Russian ethnic nation, distinct 'from' but not 'against' the other.

=== The Temple of All Religions ===
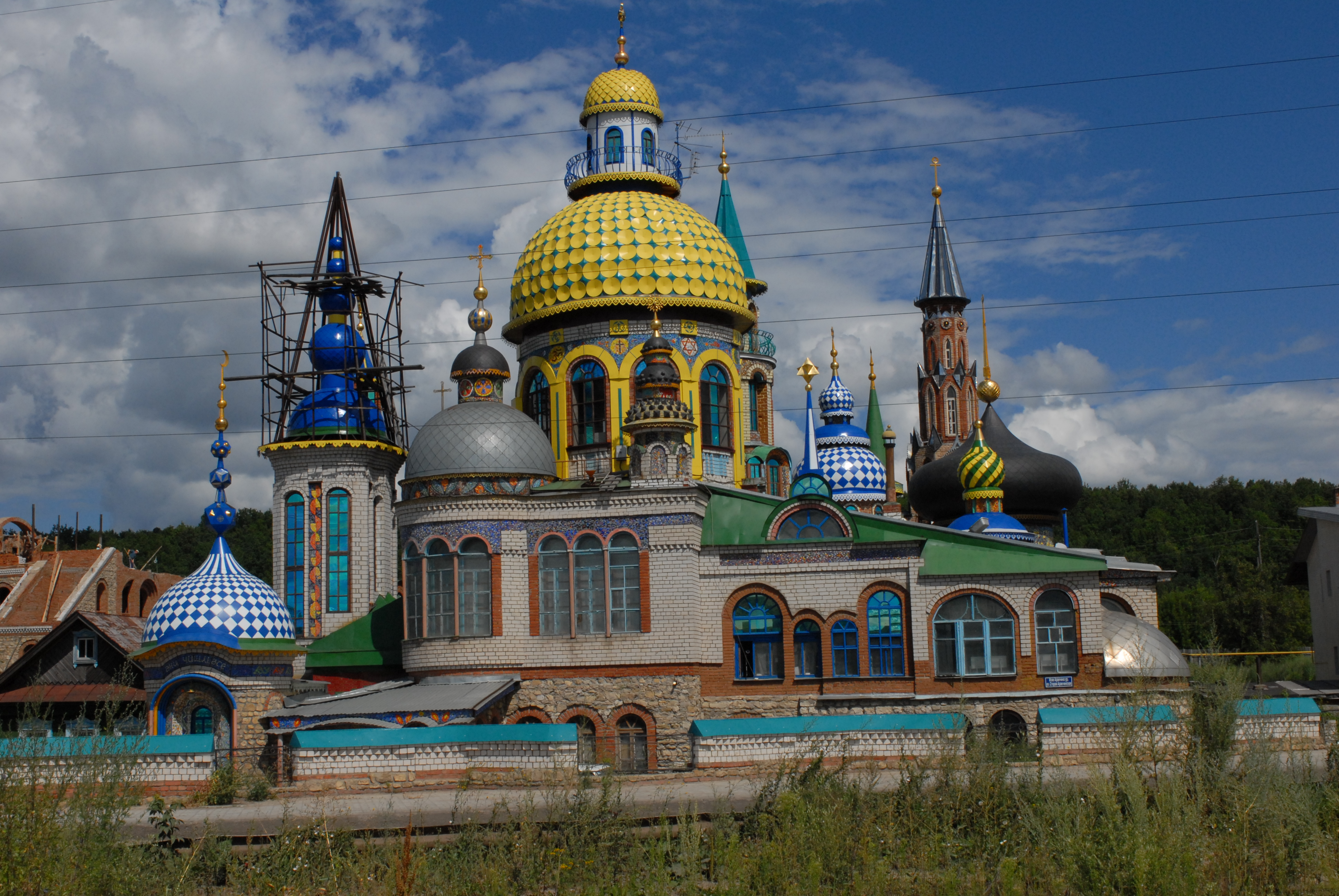
The Temple of All Religions, Kazan, Tatarstan

In addition, architecture serves as a cohesive ground for integrating Kazan not only in distinct coexisting places but within one site. The Temple of All Religions is a religious complex in the Staroye Arakchino Microdistrict of Kazan which is notable in its cohesion of several types of religious architectural elements which include an Orthodox church, a mosque, a synagogue, and others. Construction began in 1992 by Kazan artist Ildar Khanov and it serves as a cultural hub and residence for Khanov.

The Temple's mission is to depart from the traditional paradigm of housing only one religion and instead provide a 'temple of culture and truth' which peacefully combines the different cultural influences found in Kazan. The structure also serves as a center for the treatment of alcoholism, drug addiction, and other conditions and is attended by visitors both for these services and for experiencing its unique combination of religious symbols.

== Global perspective ==
Kazan's interfaith relations have attracted considerable attention given current global breakdowns towards interethnic and political strife. Hillary Clinton's October 2009 visit to Kazan also indicated the US Department of State's recognition of Kazan as a case study of productive interfaith relations.

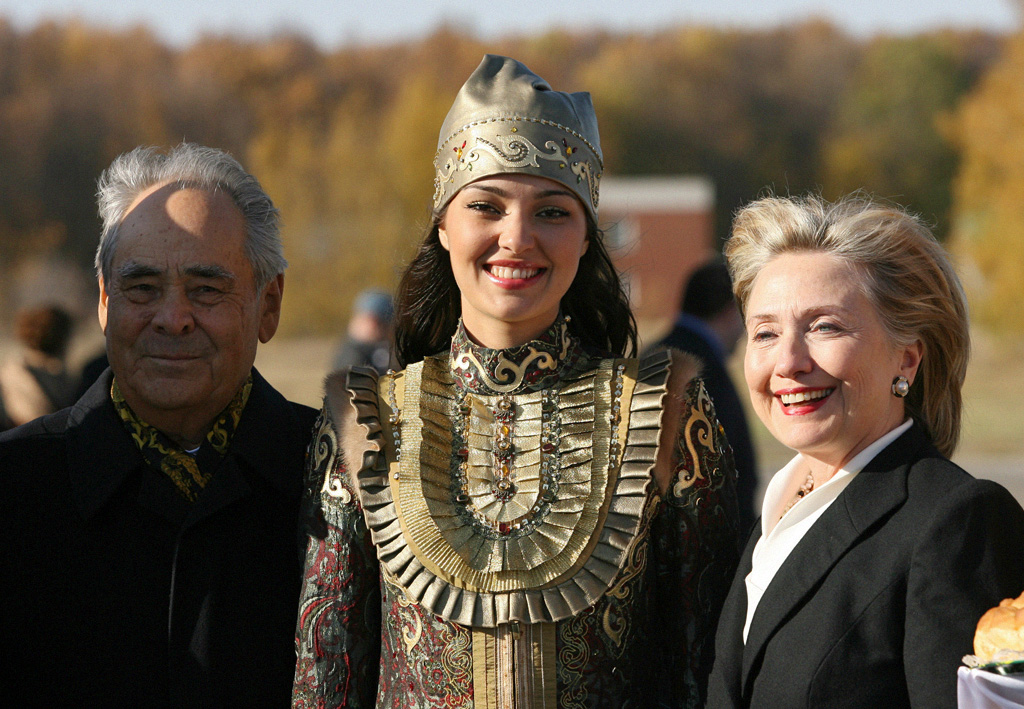
U.S. Secretary of State Hillary Clinton visits Tatarstan in 2009

Bearing in mind many of its geographic and historical factors, dominant social science theory might anticipate greater levels of conflict. Examples of cities in a similar geographic and historic position often exhibit characteristics traditionally associated with division. Among these characteristics are disputes over sovereignty, the issue of political legitimacy, and active unrest and conflict in the public space.

Kazan has been identified as a frontier city in terms of its religious demographic composition. Frontier cities exist along the 'fault lines' of ethnic and religious division and are often the place of dispute because they represent the ideal zone of power afforded to discrete territories of one group over another.

For frontier cities, issues of cultural and religious identity by claiming specific lands often trump a more generalized focus on the acquisition of new resources and sovereignty. In other words, the meaning placed on the 'indivisible good' of a specific city may instigate opposing groups' collective action against any perceived incursion on that space. These discourses are largely absent in modern-day Kazan where the urban space is interpreted in a more spatially integrated system.

Kazan's trajectory is often contrasted with histories of cities of major religious contact which can also be identified specifically as 'religious frontier cities'. Major among these are Jerusalem, which has long been the nexus of the ongoing Arab-Israeli conflict, as well as Sarajevo, where tensions between Muslim and Christian groups wrought violent ethnic conflict in the 1990s, or Belfast, where ethno-nationalist conflicts spurred riots across Northern Ireland throughout the late 20th century. Whereas, for instance, in the case of the bridge separating the Catholics and Muslims in Mostar, Bosnia—or the Berlin Wall characterizing political divide in Germany—the focus was on spatial segregation and clear lines of demarcation, Kazan's methodology has reduced antagonism by focusing on the social and economic benefits of interethnic peace and the incentive to cooperate not only on political but also religious and cultural bases.
