= Danielle Eog Makedah =

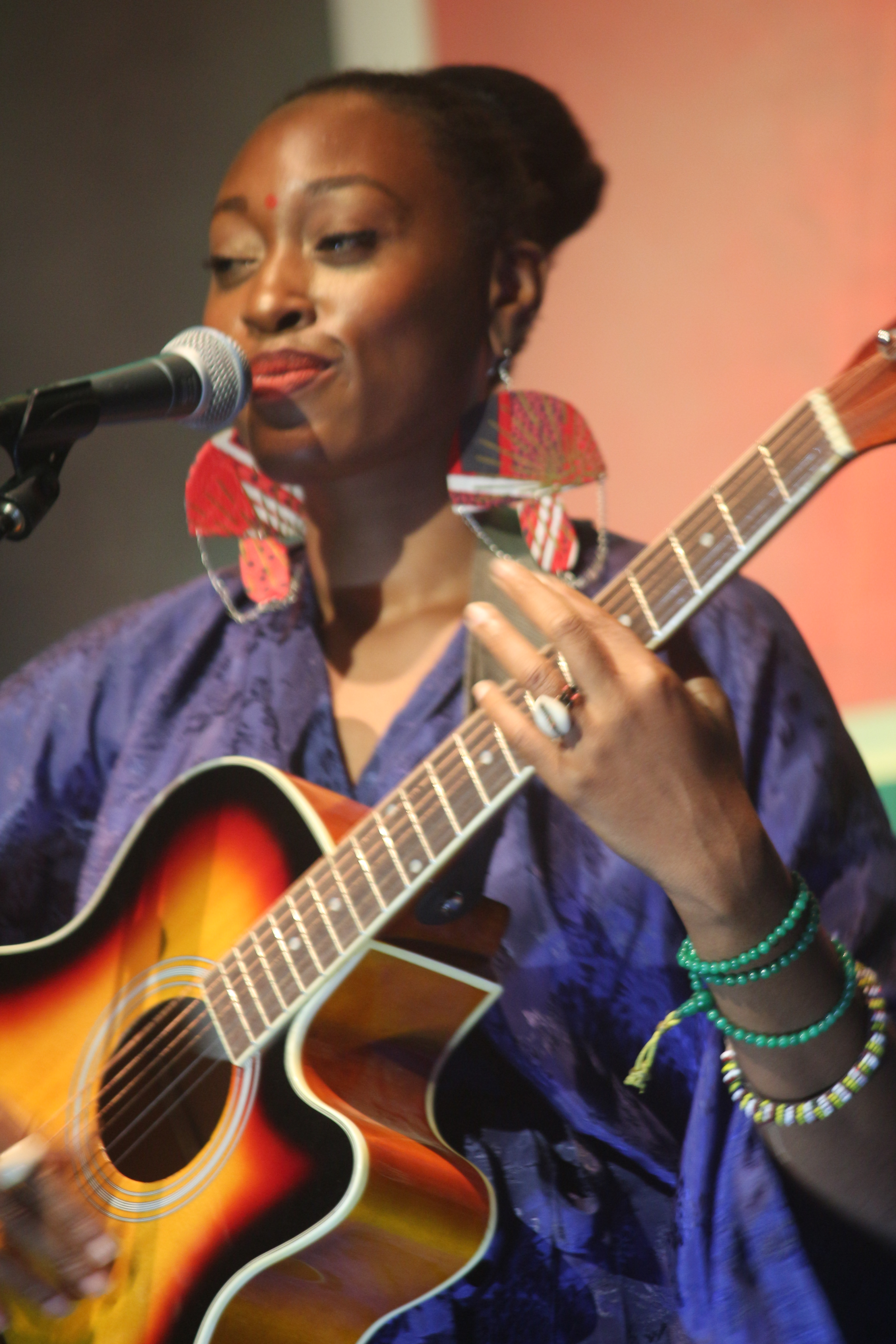

Background information
- Birth name: Danielle Tonje
- Also known as: Makedah
- Born: July 21, 1982 (age 42); Paris, France
- Origin: Cameroon
- Genres: Soul; world
- Occupation: Singer-songwriter
- Years active: 2001–present

Danielle Eog Makedah, born July 21, 1982, in Paris, is a Cameroonian singer-songwriter of soul, R&B and jazz music. She began her career on the Cameroonian hip-hop scene in 2000. She accompanied many artists on stage and had multiple collaborations for more than 10 years before the release of her first solo album in 2013. She was a finalist for the Prix Découvertes RFI in 2013. She is a member of the collective Hip Hop Developed, in which she has been playing since 2011 alongside Lady B, Teety Tezano, Adango Salicia and rapper Sadrak.

== Biography ==
Makedah was born in 1982 in the 14th arrondissement of Paris. She lived and grew up in France with her parents, both of whom were from Cameroon. She returned to Cameroon in 1997 while still in high school. She moved to Yaoundé, where she took her first steps in music, especially on the hip-hop scene, thanks to the support of rapper Krotal, with whom she made her first studio recordings in 1999. For several years, she collaborated and accompanied in choirs several renowned artists such as Manu Dibango, The Nubians, Fredy Masamba and Krotal.

In 2006, she announced her first album, Tobassi, but it was never released. In 2007, she participated in the project Rap Conteur, initiated by the MTN Cameroon telephony operator, and joined the performers of the song "Je wanda." The song became a hit and won the Song of the Year Award and Best Videogram at Canal2'or 2007.

On March 30, 2013, she released Peace, Love and Light, her first album, containing 13 tracks with varied rhythms combining jazz, hip-hop, slam, makossa and mangambeu. She was a finalist for the 2013 RFI Discoveries Prize. She participated in the Island Africa Talent competition in 2014 and finished in second place. In 2015, she was nominated for the Canal d'Or as the best World Music artist. The same year, she released "Hold on Sister," a duet with singer Teety Tezano. She has had several international tours, including MASA with the collective Hip Hop Developed. She released the song "Ma Flamme" in April 2018.

Makedah is the mother of two children, Noe and Moonie.

== Discography ==
=== Albums ===
- 2013: Peace, Love and Light

=== Singles ===
- 2012: The Day
- 2018: My Flame

=== Collaborations ===
- 2001: By Nadine Patricia's Love
- 2002: Tragedy, Ak Sang Grave
- 2002: United States of Africa, Ak Sang Grave
- 2007: I Wanda, Storyteller 1
- 2010: Strengthens my faith of Bashiru
- 2010: Multiply by Ayriq Akam
- 2010: It's easy to see Ayriq Akam
- 2011: Finally from Just Woan
- 2012: To us the Life of Krotal
- 2012: Hope of Ebene
- 2013: Our Day from Veeby
- 2013: Message of Peace of Valsero
- 2015: Hold on Sister by Teety Tezano

=== Compilations ===
- 2007: Rap storyteller
- 2008: DJ StrS's Cameroon / Senegal
- 2012: Kamer Force One (Belgium Cameroon)
- 2013: Women for Women (Canada)

== Awards and competitions ==
- 2001: Female Revelation, Cameroon Youth Awards
- 2002: Best female voice, Cameroon Hip Hop Awards
- 2003: Best female voice, Cameroon Hip hop Awards
- 2007: Nomination, song of the year, Canal d'Or, Je Wanda with Rap Storytellers
- 2007: Best Clip, Golden Channel, for Je Wanda with Rap Storytellers
- 2013: Finalist Prix Découvertes RFI
- 2011: Best collaboration, Mboa Hip Hop awards, for A us life with KROTAL
- 2012: Best Single Maxi, Mboa Hip Hop Awards, for The Day
- 2014: Finalist, Island Africa Talent (2nd, Universal Music)
- 2015: Nominated, Canal 2Or, best artist World Music
