= Ildar Khanov =

Russian artist and architect

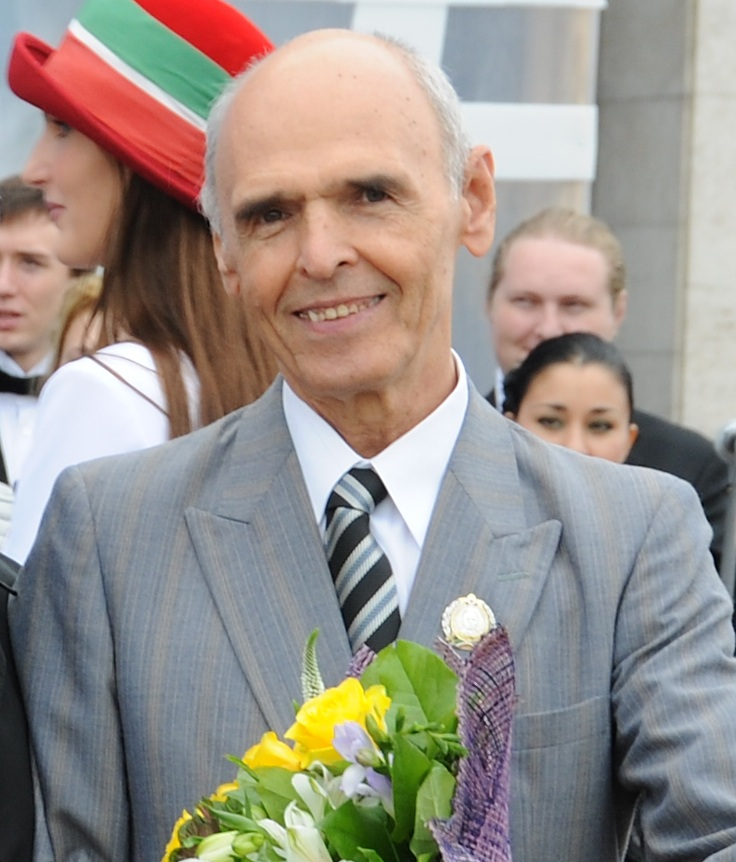
- Born: 1939; Republic of Tatarstan, Russian SFSR, Soviet Union
- Died: 2013 (aged 73–74); Kazan, Republic of Tatarstan, Russia
- Education: Moscow Surikov State Academic Institute of Fine Arts
- Occupations: Artist, architect
- Known for: Creator of the Temple of All Religions

Ildar Khanov (1939–2013) was a Russian artist and architect, best known for creating the Temple of All Religions in Kazan, Russia.

== Early life and education ==
Khanov was born in the Republic of Tatarstan. From an early age, he claimed to have had mystical experiences; at the age of three, during a near-death episode amid wartime starvation, he reported a vision of Jesus Christ, which he said endowed him with healing abilities. Khanov pursued formal education in the arts, studying monumental painting at the Moscow Surikov State Academic Institute of Fine Arts during the 1960s.

== Career ==
After completing his education, he returned to Tatarstan, where he worked on public sculptures and fountains, particularly in the city of Naberezhnye Chelny.

=== Temple of All Religions ===
In 1994, Khanov began building the Temple of All Religions (also known as the Universal Temple), located in Staroye Arakchino, a suburb of Kazan. Originally, Khanov had attempted to build a similar project in Naberezhnye Chelny, disguised as a hotel, but after his plans were discovered, he relocated the construction to his childhood home. According to Khanov, the inspiration for the temple came from another vision of Jesus Christ, who instructed him to create a space uniting all major world religions. The Temple was envisioned as a cultural center rather than a place of worship, featuring architectural elements symbolizing various religions, including Christianity, Islam, Buddhism, Judaism, and ancient faiths.

Khanov also practiced as a healer, claiming to treat up to 300 patients per day for addictions and various diseases. He funded much of the temple’s construction through donations from those he treated and from volunteers who also assisted with building work.

== Death ==
Ildar Khanov died in 2013 at the age of 73. His brother, Ilgiz Khanov, continued the project after his death.
