= Temple of All Religions =

Multi religious complex in Kazan, Russia

Temple of All Religions Храм всех религий
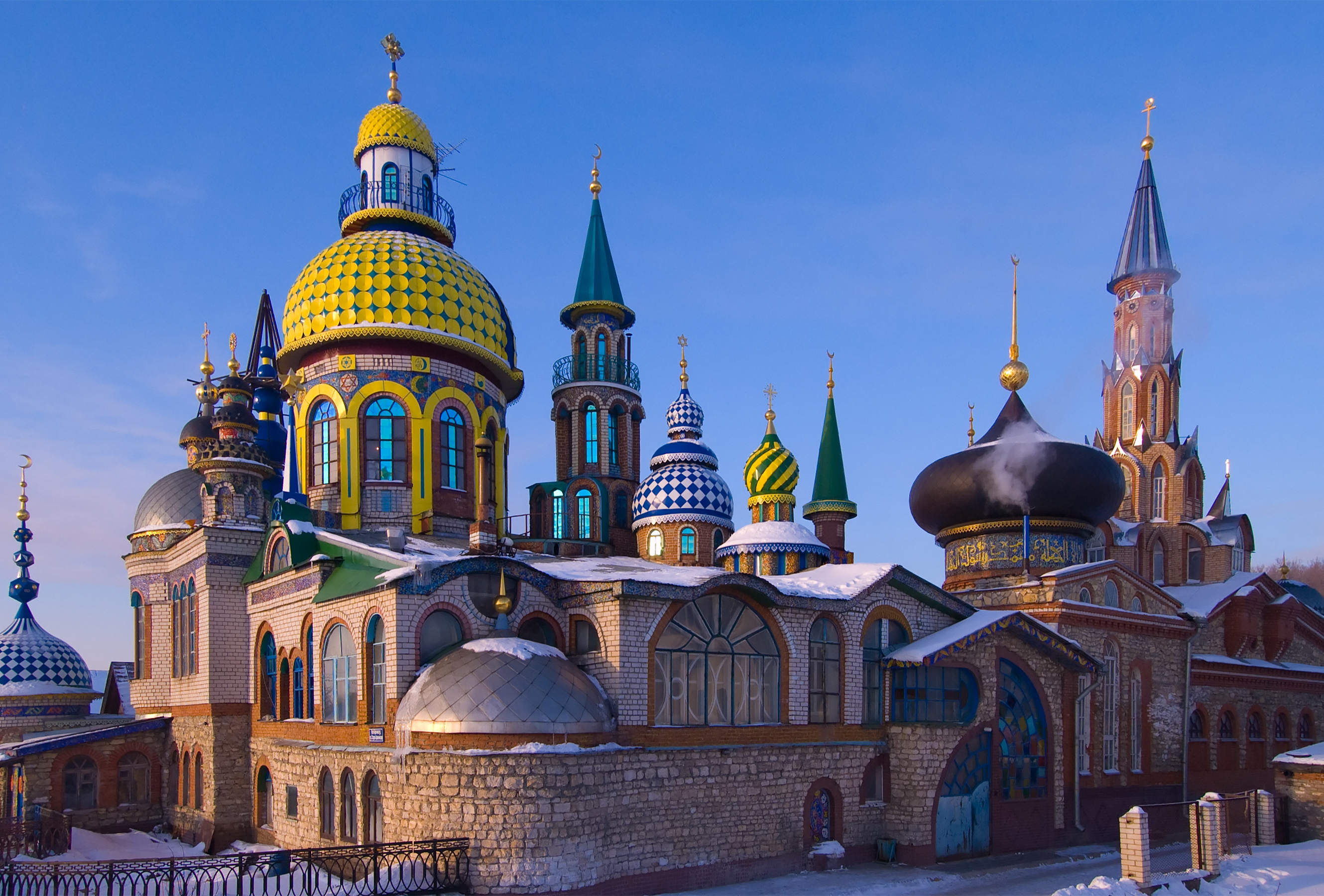

Religion
- Affiliation: multiple

Location
- Location: Staroye Arakchino Microdistrict, Kazan, Russia
- Interactive map of Temple of All Religions; Храм всех религий
- Coordinates: 55°48′2″N 48°58′30″E

Architecture
- Architect: Ildar Khanov
- Style: eclectic
- Groundbreaking: 1992

The Temple of All Religions (Russian: Храм всех религий, Tatar: Барлык диннәр гыйбәдәтханәсе, romanized: Barlıq dinnär ğibädätxanäse) or the Universal Temple (Russian: Вселенский храм) is an architectural complex in the Staroye Arakchino Microdistrict of Kazan, Russia. It consists of several types of religious architecture including an Orthodox church, a mosque, and a synagogue, among others. It is currently under construction since 1992, started by local artist and philanthropist Ildar Khanov (1940 - 2013). The structure now serves as a cultural center and a residence for Khanov's brother and sister, who both continue to serve as guides and supervisors of the complex.

Khanov was known for his efforts in the treatment of alcoholism, drug addiction, and various other addictions. His patients helped him to maintain and develop the Temple, either by direct involvement in the construction work or through sponsorship.

The structure is not an active temple of any religion, but rather, as Khanov described its mission, a "temple of culture and truth". It has become a popular landmark in the city of Kazan, which takes pride in the peaceful combination of different cultures (Islamic Tatar culture, Orthodox Russian, and others). The Temple is often visited by locals and tourists.

Khanov said that eventually the structure should have 16 cupolas, corresponding to the 16 major world religions, including past religions that are no longer practiced.

== Gallery ==
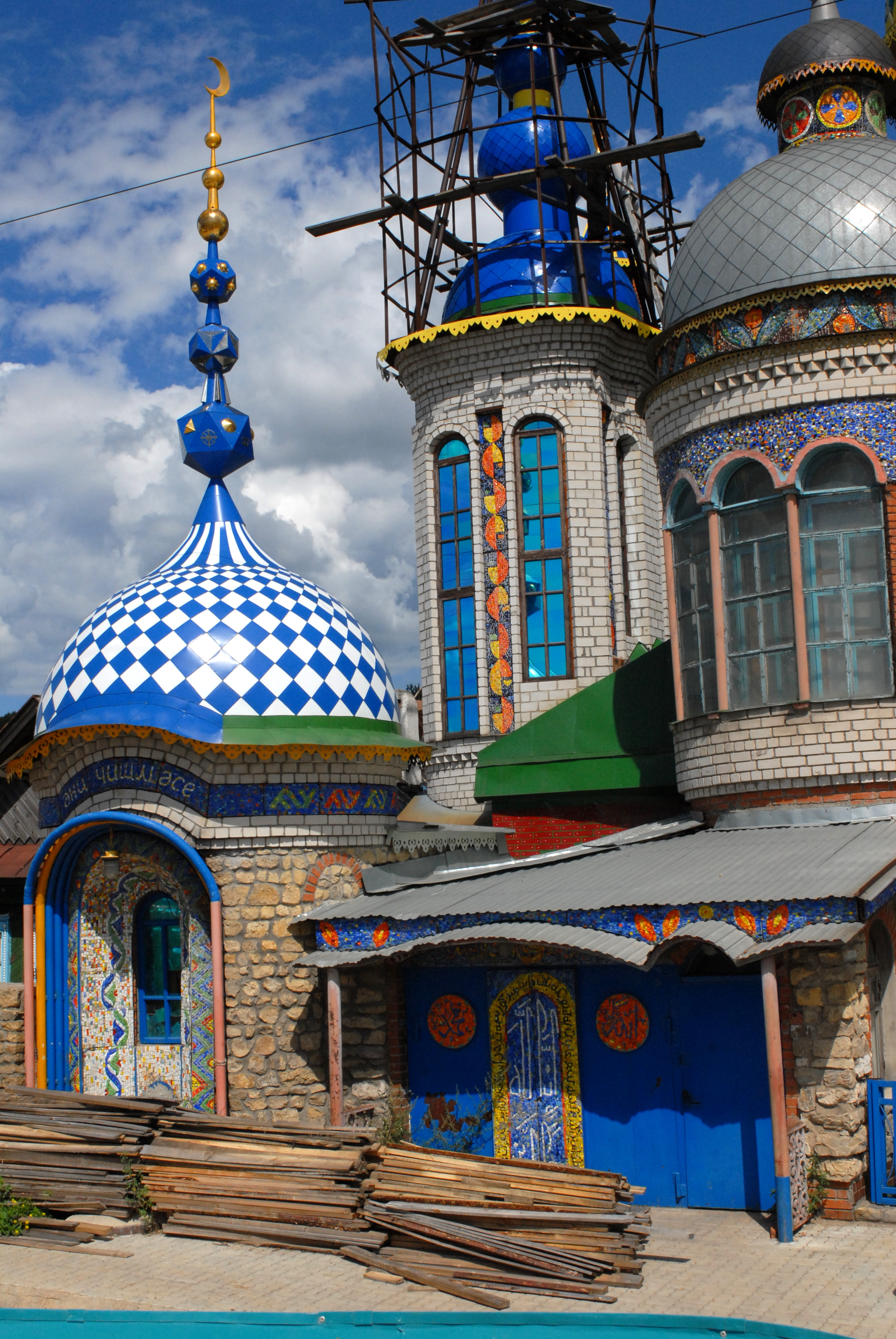

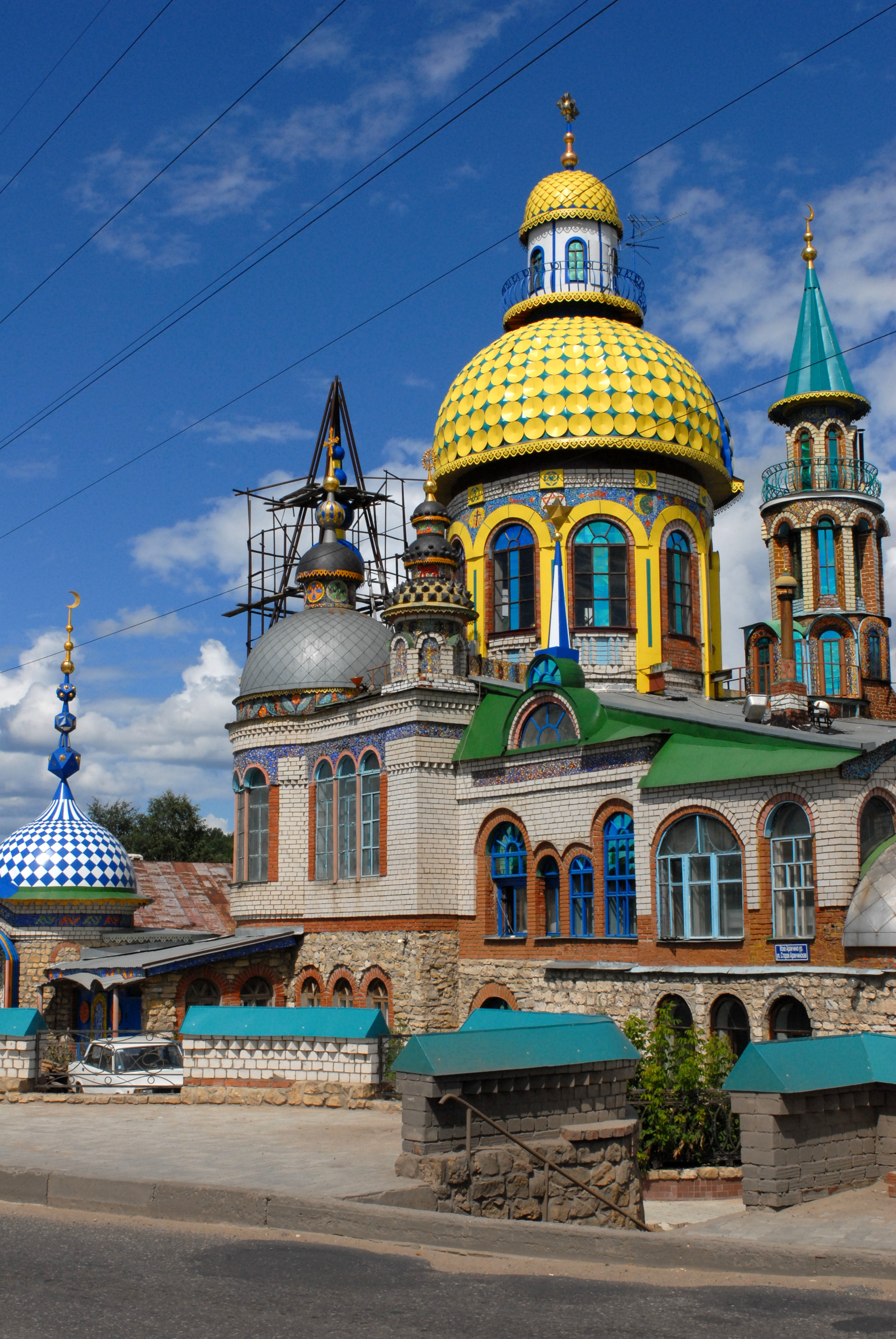

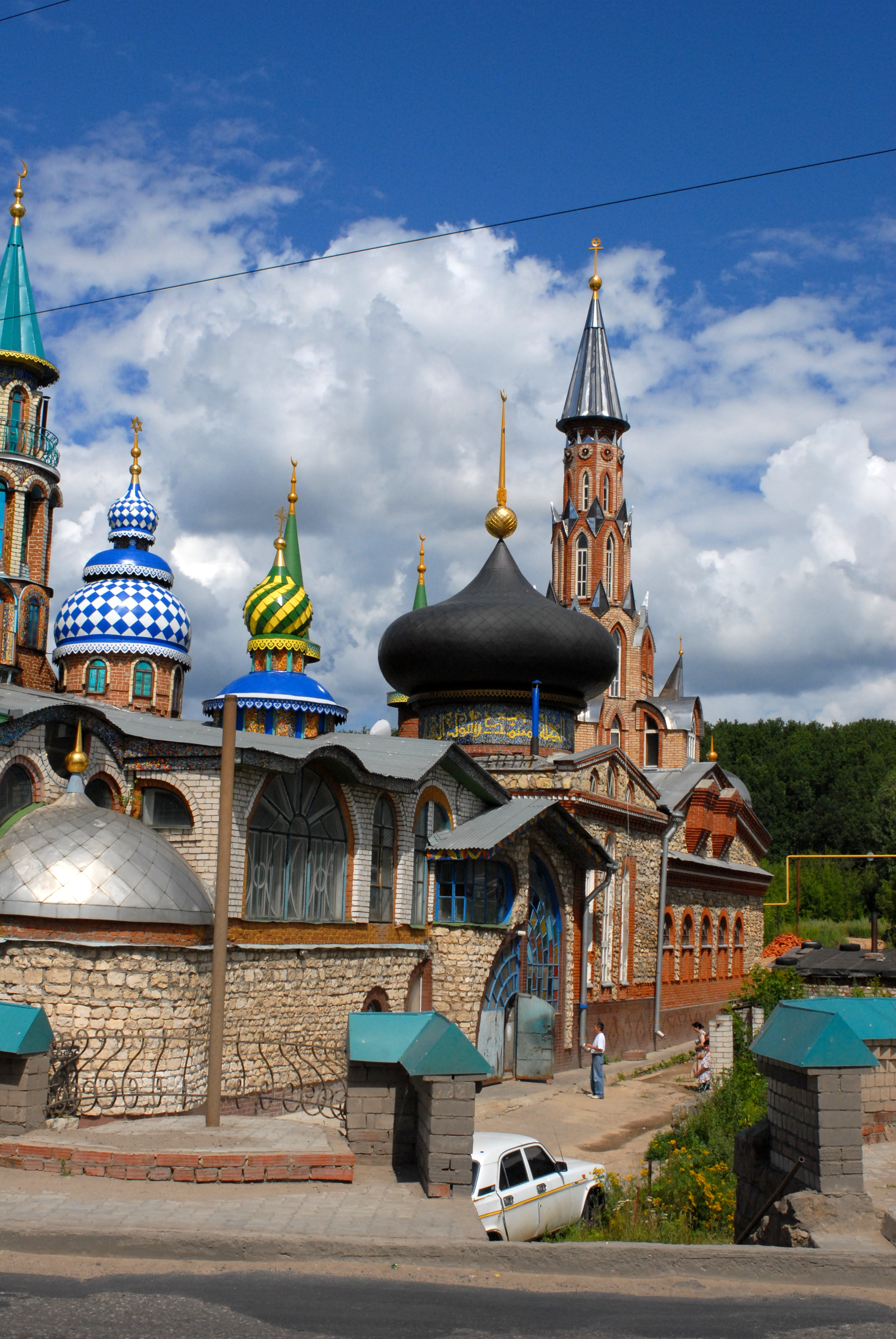

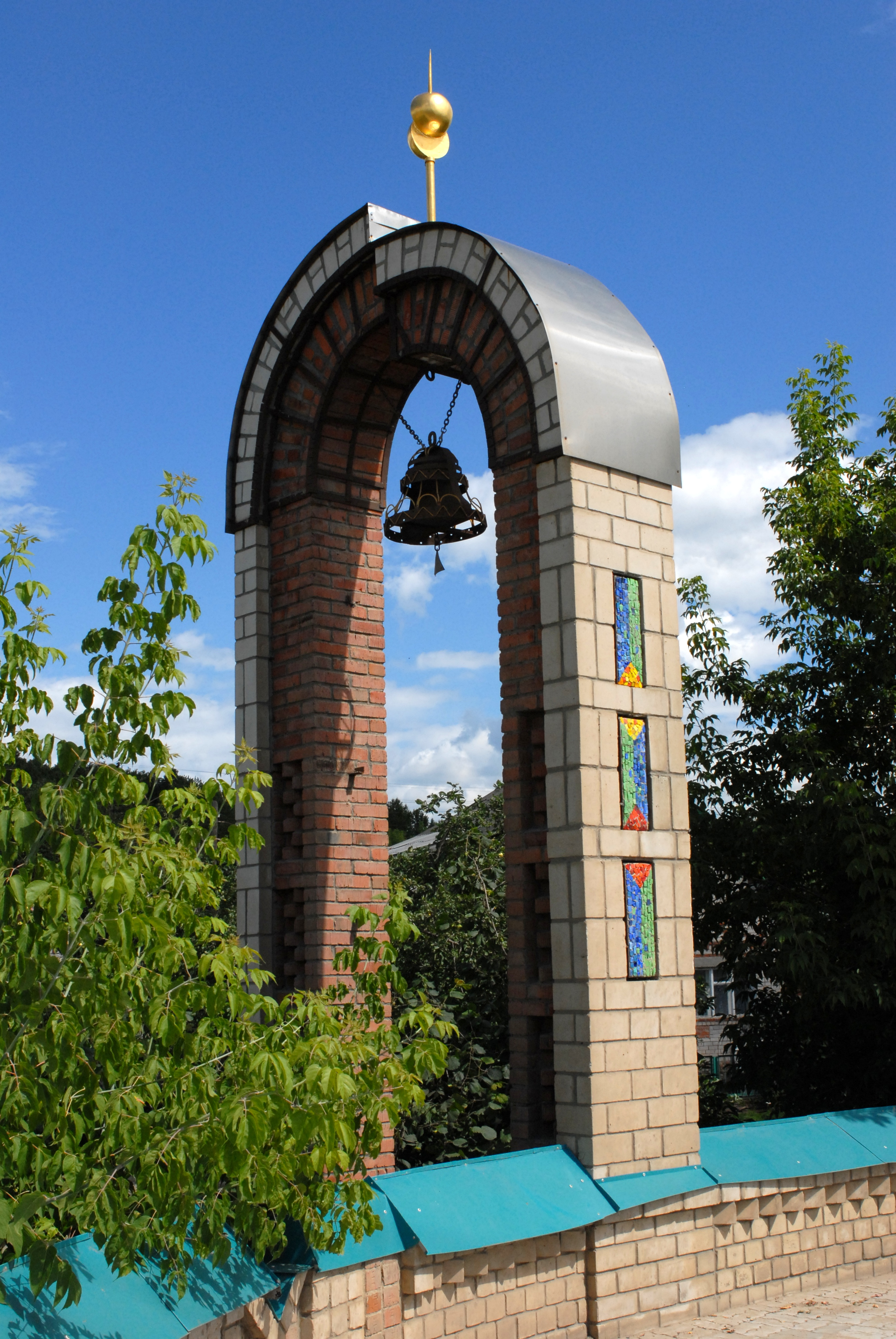

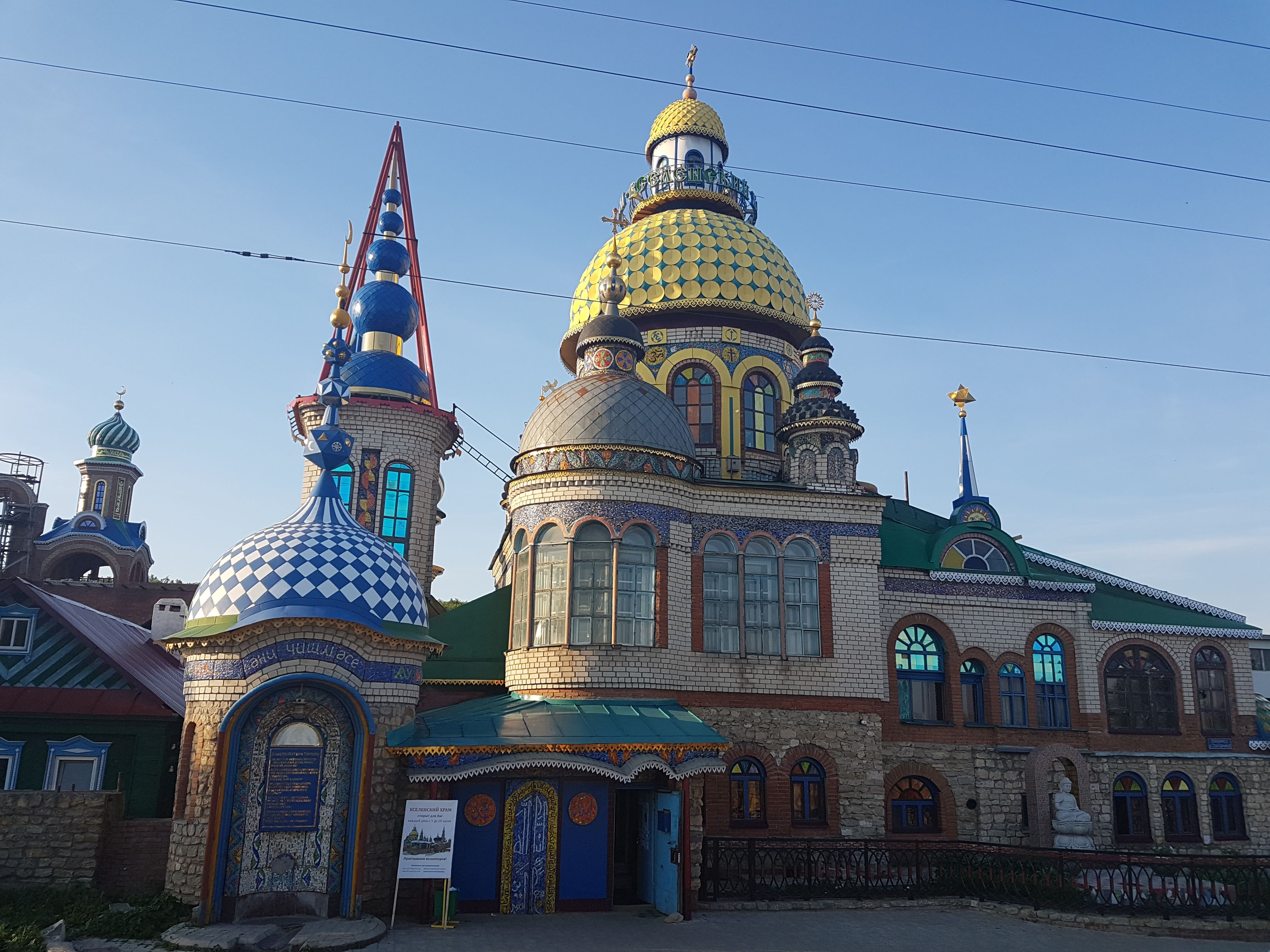

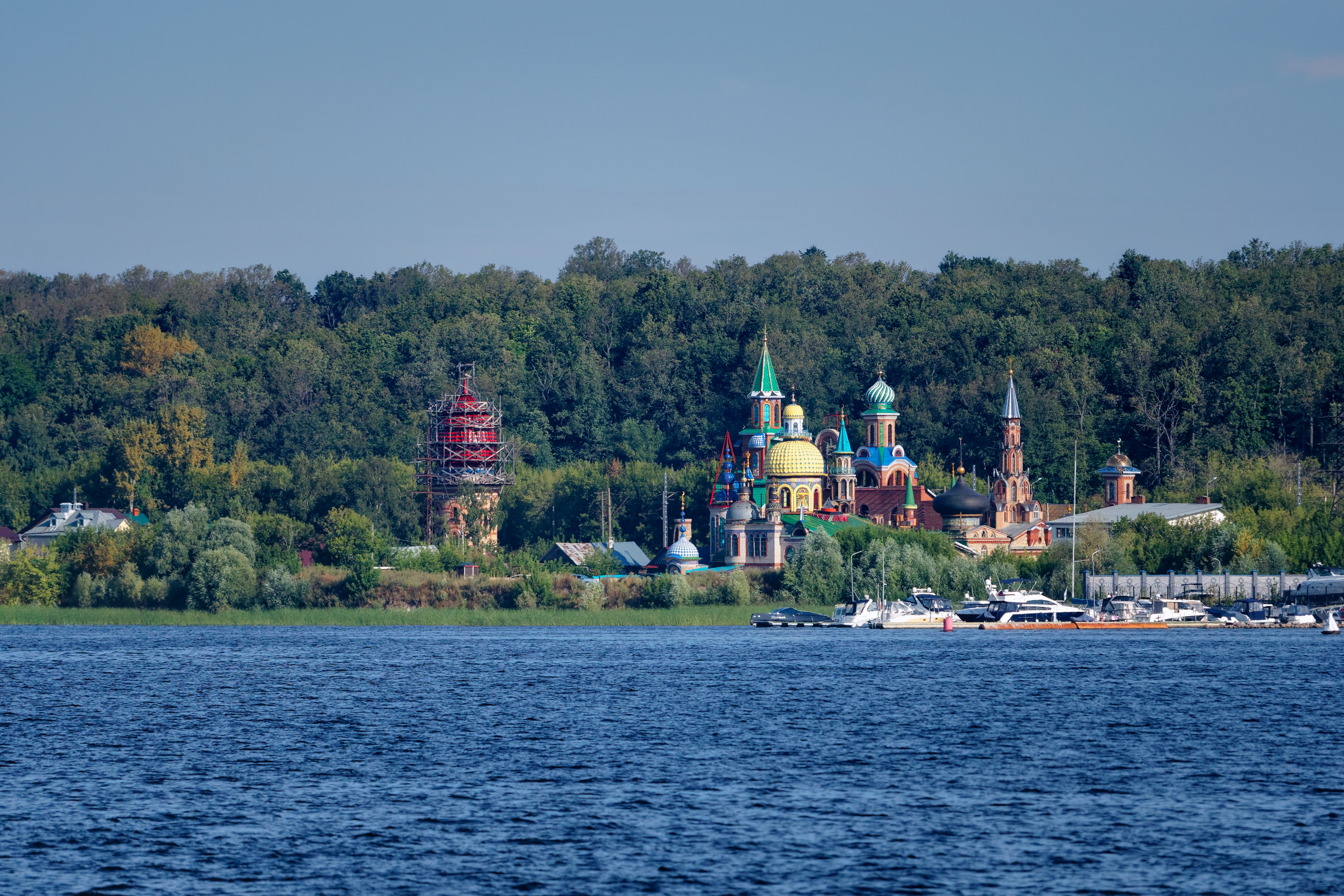
