= A Message of Peace =

A Message of Peace (Urdu:Paigham-e-Sulh) is the last book written by Mirza Ghulam Ahmad, the founder of the Ahmadiyya movement in Islam. The book was completed on 25 May 1908, a day earlier before his demise. The book was originally written in the Urdu language and has been translated to English.

== Background ==
Mirza Ghulam Ahmad wrote this fifty page book in two days, finishing it a day before his demise of May 26, 1908. He had planned to read this piece of work on May 26, 1908, at Ahmadiyya Building in Lahore. However, he died after a very brief illness. It was, however, published in a booklet form.

== Synopsis ==
The main focus relayed in this booklet by Mirza Ghulam Ahmad is the gap between the Hindus and Muslims of India due to the mutual hatred and differences in cultures. In this, he made a fervent urgent appeal and declared that the teaching of Islam inculcates respect and reverence for each other's religious values and sensibilities. Moreover, he states the spiritual statuses of Rama, Chanderji and Krishna, as divine saints and the Vedas as being one of many books of God.
