= Bafut Subdivision =

Commune in Northwest Region, Cameroon

The Bafut Subdivision or the Kingdom/Chiefdom/Fondom of Bafut is a commune in the Mezam Department of Northwest Province, Cameroon. It is located in the Western Grassfields region - a name for the Northwest Province and surrounding grassland areas. Bafut is the most powerful of the traditional kingdoms of the Grassfields, now divided into 26 wards along a 10 kilometre stretch of the "Ring Road" that trails along a ridge above the Menchum Valley.

Bafut is primarily an agrarian region. The major languages of the region are the Bafut language and Cameroonian Pidgin English. Its headquarters are located in the town of Bafut.

== History ==
Bafut was a fondom or kingdom - ruled by the Fon of Bafut using traditional power structures. However, following the Bafut Wars in the early 20th century, the region came under the German Empire. The Germans forced the Fon into exile, but had to ultimately reinstate him as leader when their puppet ruler was not accepted. The fall of the German Empire in World War I brought the region under the British Empire as part of the British Cameroons. At least one Fon of Bafut, Achirimbi II maintained friendly ties with the British. When the British left Cameroon in 1961, the region had a choice of joining either the newly formed Cameroon or Nigeria. Achirimbi II is famously said to have remarked that it was a choice between the "Fire and the Deep Sea"; the region ultimately joined Cameroon.

Since 2017, Bafut has become of battleground of the Anglophone Crisis. Operation Free Bafut in April 2020 saw heavy fighting in and around the village between the Cameroonian military and the separatist Seven Karta militia.

== Geography ==
The region of Bafut is situated about twenty kilometres northwest of Bamenda and covers an area of roughly 340 square kilometres (130 sq mi). The estimated population of 80,000 (2005) is settled in three main zones.

- At the centre are the people of Mumala'a (heart of the country) clustered around the Fon's palace who refer to themselves as the real Bafut (Bufu). This name can be applied to the whole chiefdom.
- To the south is the Ntare (ridge area)
- To the north is the Mbunti (lower) which descends abruptly to the Menchum river valley

== Traditional power structures ==
Bafut is one of the two regions in Cameroon (the other being Bali, Cameroon), where traditional power structures are still in place. Bafut is a chiefdom or fondom. It was long the centre of the local kingdom of the Tikar people (originally from the Northern regions of Lake Chad), and is administered by the Fon of Bafut. The Fon of Bafut was, and to some extent still is, the paramount Fon of the region, with all other Fons pledging allegiance to him.

== The region in popular culture ==
The Bafut Subdivision is known for

- its palace of the Fon of Bafut, which houses a museum (see Fon of Bafut for a section on the palace)
- for its annual festival Abin e Mfor or the Dance of the Mfor/Fon
- as the place where the famous naturalist Gerald Durrell came on two animal-collecting expeditions in 1949 and 1957. Durrell wrote two accounts - The Bafut Beagles and A Zoo in My Luggage - on his travels in Bafut, and created a mini TV series To Bafut with Beagles.
