= Bafut =

Bafut may refer to several things relating to Cameroon:

- Bafut language
- Bafut Subdivision
  - Bafut, Cameroon, the headquarters town of the subdivision
- Bafut Wars, a series of early 20th-century wars
- Fon of Bafut the local ruler

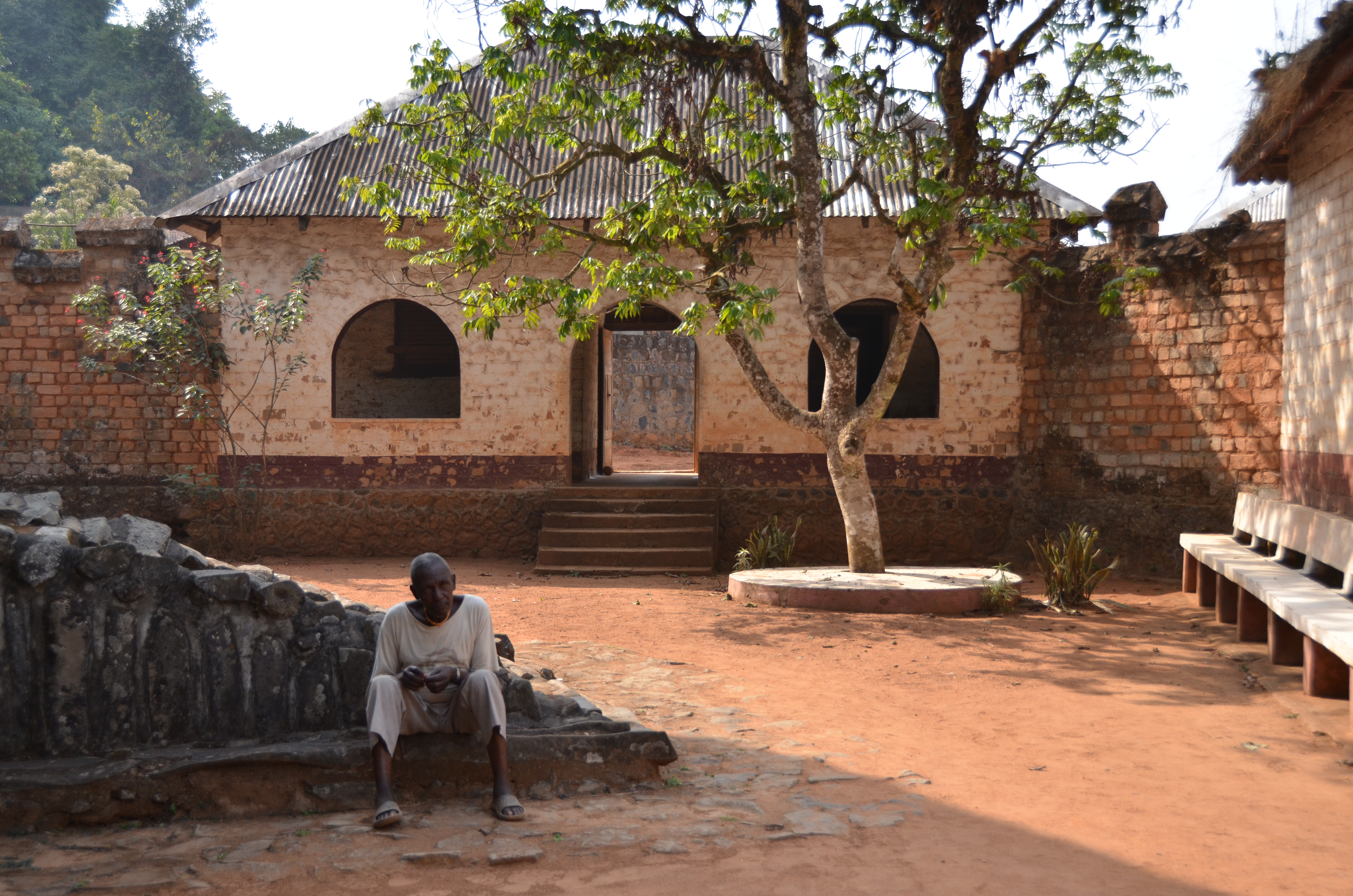
Bafut-85
