= Bafut, Cameroon =

Bafut
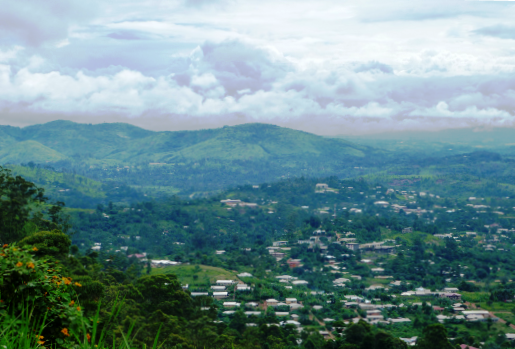
- View over Bafut Commune

- Location in Cameroon
- Coordinates: 6°05′N 10°06′E
- Country: Cameroon
- Province: Northwest Province
- Department: Mezam

Government
  - Type: Local Government (traditional democracy)

Population (2001)
  - Total: 80,305
- Website: www.bafut.council.org

Bafut is a town located in a modern commune in Cameroon, it is also a traditional fondom. It is located in the Mezam Department, which in turn is located in the Northwest Province.

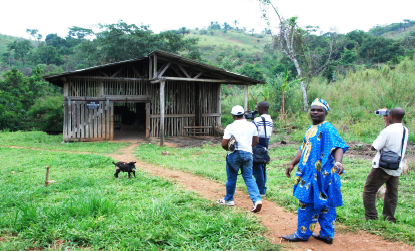
Bafut - Cameroon 2

Bafut is famous for having preserved its structure as a traditional kingdom (or "Fondom" ), under the leadership of the Fon of Bafut. Its traditional power structures operate in harmony with its modern local government council, which aims to turn Bafut into an eco-city.

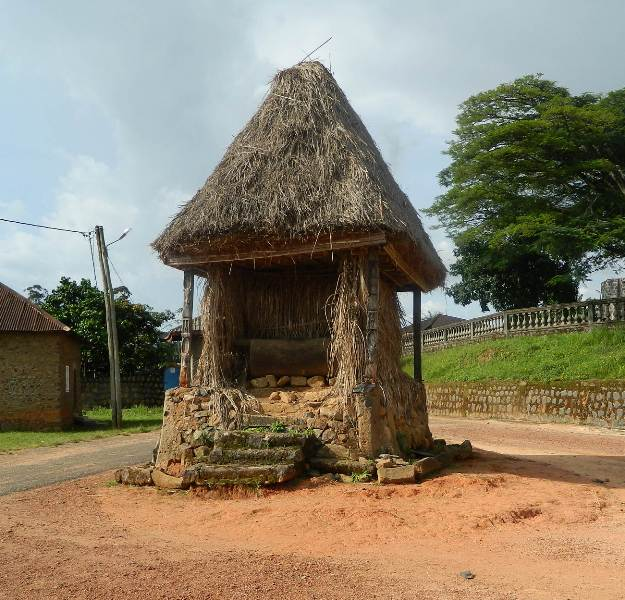
BAFUT PALACE - HUT FOR THE TALKING DRUM

== History ==
The Bafut tradition traces its dynastic origins to the Ndobo or Tikari areas. From the reign of Firloo, the first Fon of Bafut, it has operated as a fondom or kingdom, using traditional power structures. Upon their arrival from Tikari at least 400 years ago, the Bafut people built the current "old palace" of Mbebeli, also known as Ntoh Firloo. It still contains the tombs of the first three Bafut kings Firloo, Nebasi Suh and Ambebi.

The Fon's palace, and thus the centre of Bafut's traditional power, was later moved to its current location, and by the time of the German colonisation of the Cameroons in the late 19th century, Bafut had roughly assumed its present make-up.

=== The Bafut Wars and German colonisation ===
The Bafut Wars resulted from German colonial intrusion into the Bafut fondom.

The German explorer Dr Eugen Zintgraff visited Bafut in 1889. He had earlier stopped in Bali Nyonga where he had received a warm welcome from Galega, the Fon of Bali Nyonga. However the Bafut Fon, Abumbi, received him with circumspection since Bafut was not on good terms with Bali Nyonga. Zintgraff is said to have committed two breaches of etiquette. He seized the drinking cup from the Fon's hand and drank from it and he insisted on calling Abumbi by his princely name 'Gualem'. This open display of disrespect was interpreted in Bafut as a deliberate attempt to belittle the Fon and it was assumed that Galega of Bali Nyonga was behind this.

Relations between Bafut and the Germans subsequently deteriorated to the point of armed conflict. In 1891 Bafut went to the aid of its neighbour and ally Mankon which had been attacked by a German-led Bali Nyonga force en route to Bafut. This force had been sent to avenge the death of two of Zintgraff's messengers sent to Bafut to demand ivory. On 31 January 1891 it attacked Mankon and burnt the town. As the attacking force retired, Mankon warriors, assisted now by their allies from Bafut, counter-attacked and inflicted heavy losses on their enemies. Ten years later the Germans, under Pavel, returned in full force. Bafut suffered a series of punitive raids in 1901, 1904–05 and 1907, at the end of which the Fon was arrested and exiled to Douala for a year.

In the meantime a military station had been established at Bamenda which served as the administrative headquarters of the district until the Germans were expelled during the World War of 1914–1918. The Bamenda garrison fell in October 1915.

=== British colonisation ===
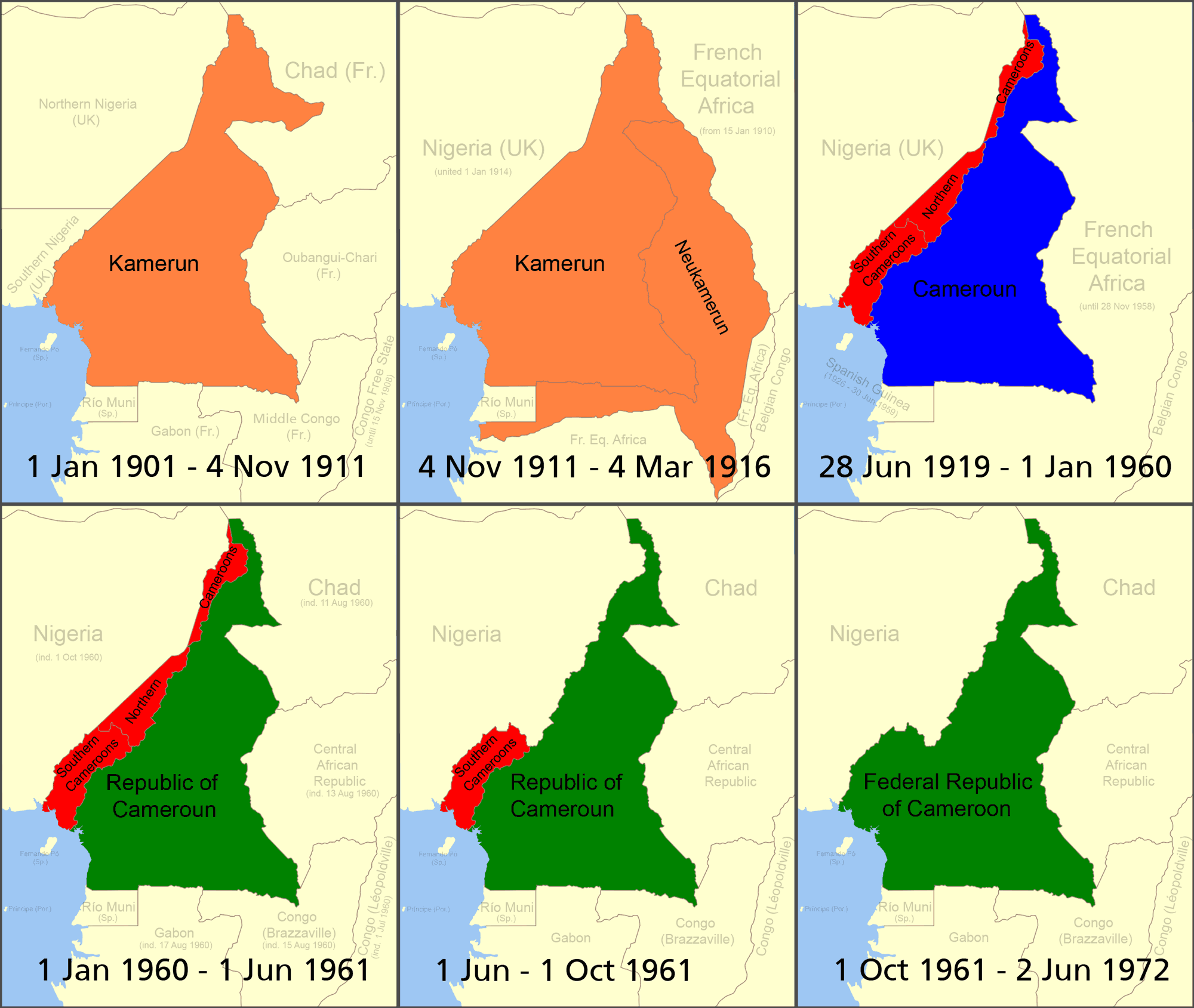
Cameroon 1901–1972 German Kamerun British Cameroons French Cameroun Republic of Cameroon

After a brief period of joint administration Britain and France provisionally partitioned the territory and this, with only minor adjustments, was confirmed by the Milner–Simon agreement of July 1919. Bafut fell into the British sector which was constituted into the Cameroons Province and attached to the Southern Provinces of British Nigeria for administrative purposes. At least one Fon of Bafut, Achirimbi II maintained friendly ties with the British. When the British left part of Cameroon in 1961, the region had a choice of joining either the newly formed Cameroon or Nigeria. The Fon Achirimbi II is famously said to have remarked that it was a choice between the "Fire and the Deep Sea".

=== Post-colonial history ===
On 1 January 1960, French Cameroun gained independence from France, and on 1 October 1961, the formerly British Southern Cameroons (including Bafut) united with French Cameroun to form the Federal Republic of Cameroon.

The Bafut Council was created by a presidential decree on 23 November 1993 to promote local development and improve the living conditions of the region's inhabitants. The local government began operation in 1996, following municipal elections.

Since 2017, Bafut has been a key battleground in the Anglophone Crisis. The town became a stronghold for the Ambazonian separatist militia known as Seven Karta, which led to intense conflict, including the major military offensive "Operation Free Bafut" in April 2020 that resulted in heavy fighting throughout the area.

== Geography and demographics ==
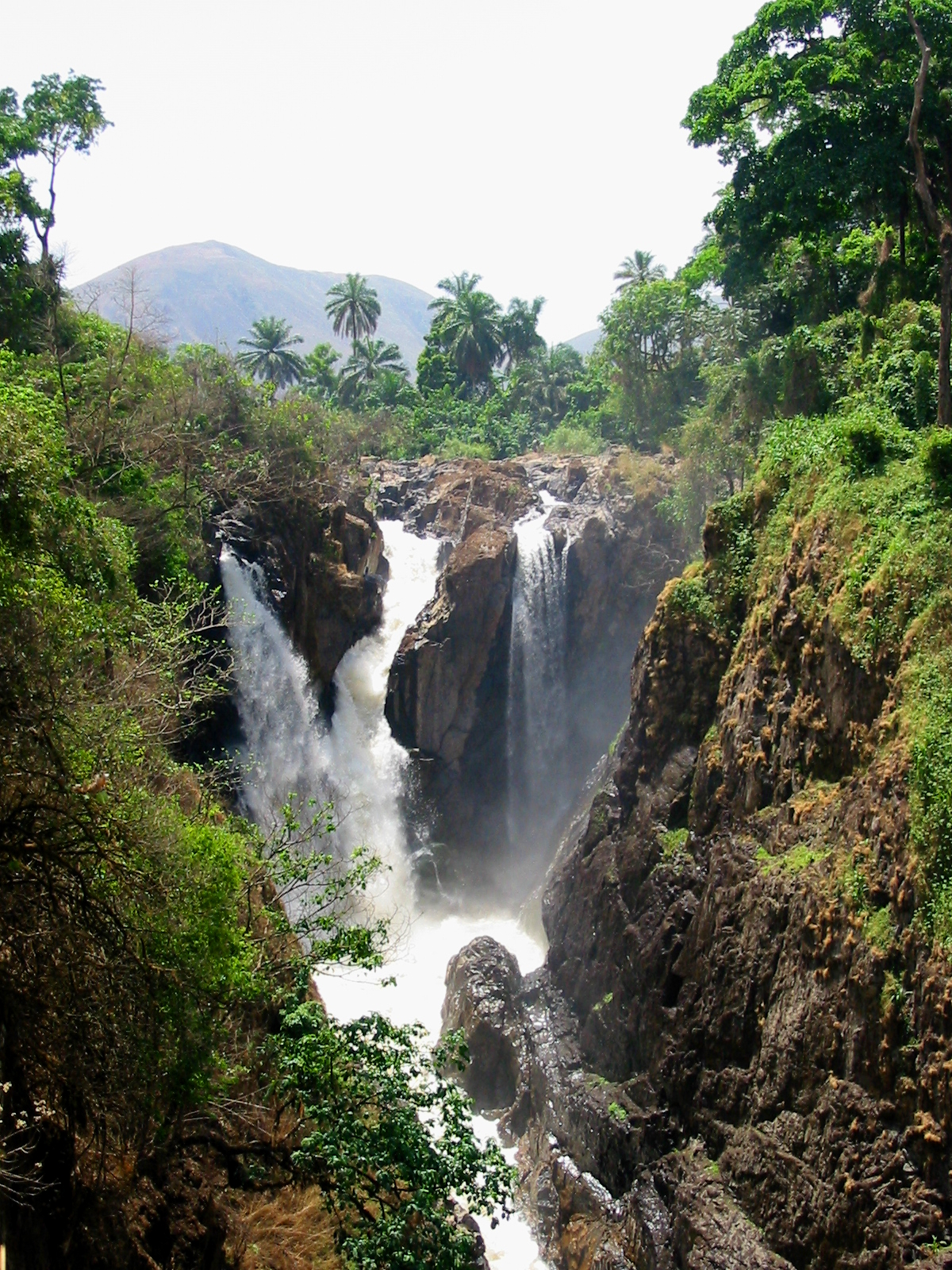
Menchum Falls

Bafut had a population of 80,305 in 2005, but is now estimated to have over 100,000 inhabitants. It is primarily an agrarian region.

Bafut is situated about 20 kilometres (12 mi) northwest of Bamenda, in the Mezam Division, and covers an area of roughly 340 km^{2}.

It is located in the Western Grassfields geographic region, which includes Cameroon's Northwest Province and surrounding grassland areas. Bafut is the most powerful of the traditional kingdoms of the Grassfields, now divided into 26 wards along a 10-kilometre stretch of the "Ring Road" that trails along a ridge above the Menchum Valley. The population is settled in three main zones:

- At the centre are the people of Mumala'a (heart of the country) clustered around the Fon's palace who refer to themselves as the real Bafut (Bufu). This name can be applied to the whole chiefdom.
- To the south is the Ntare (ridge area) .
- To the north is the Mbunti (lower) which descends abruptly to the Menchum river valley.

The major languages are the Bafut language and Cameroonian Pidgin English, though Mundum, Mbuhnti and French are also spoken. The Bafut language is classed within the Mbam-Nkam section of the central branch of the Niger-Congo family along with other nearby languages such as Bali Nyonga, Bamum and Pinyin

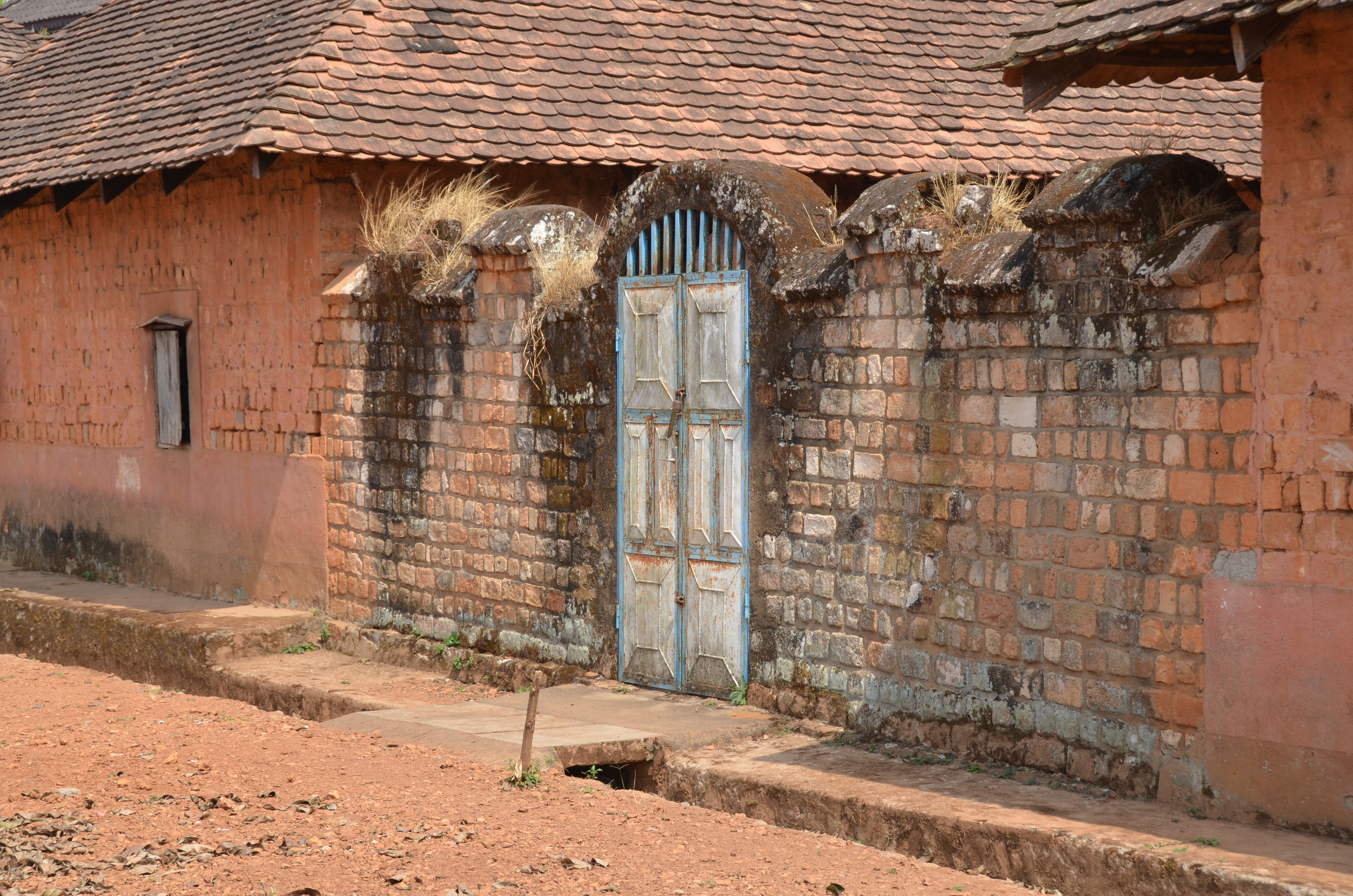
Side entrance of the Palace

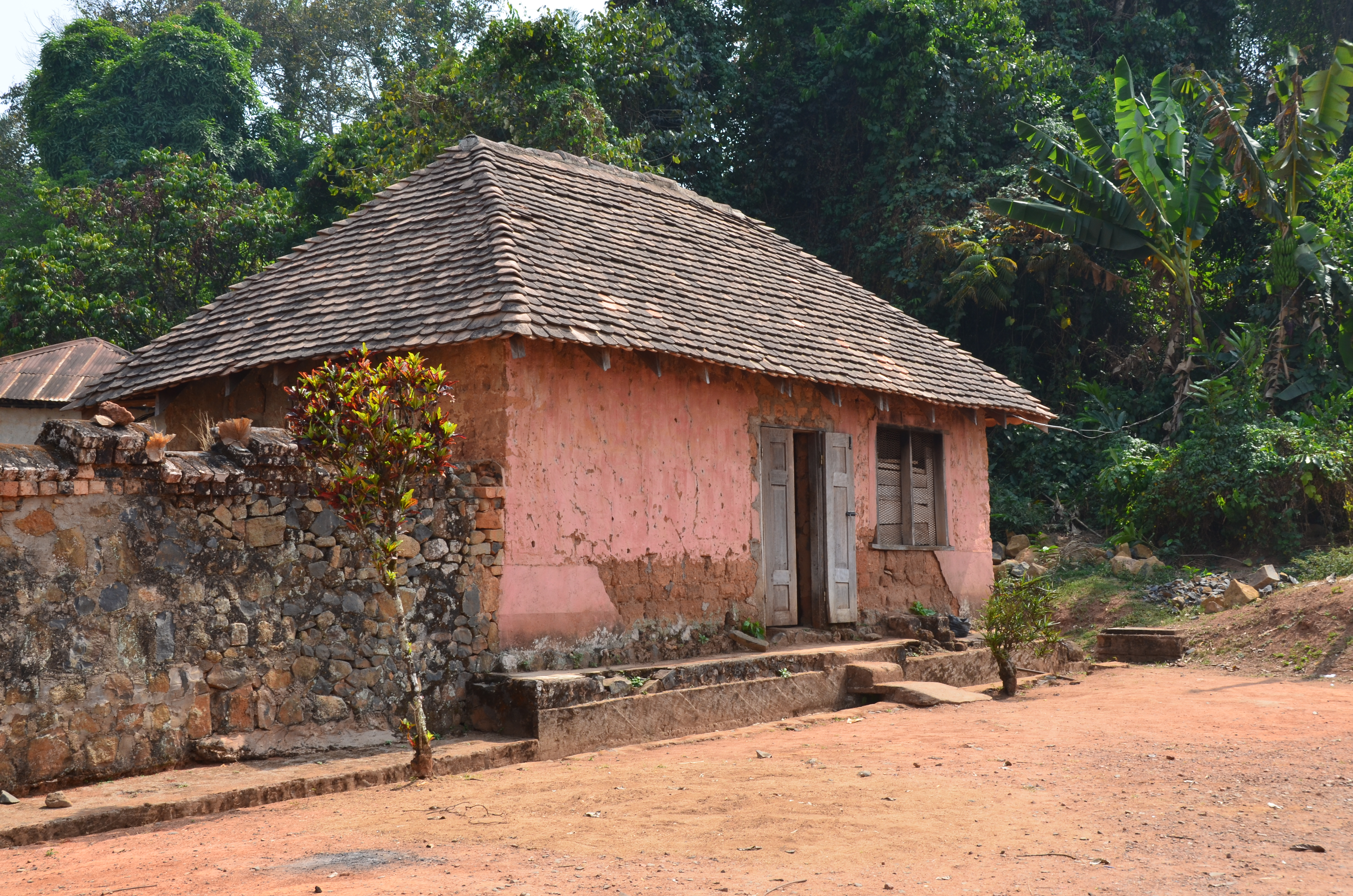
Home corner of the Palace

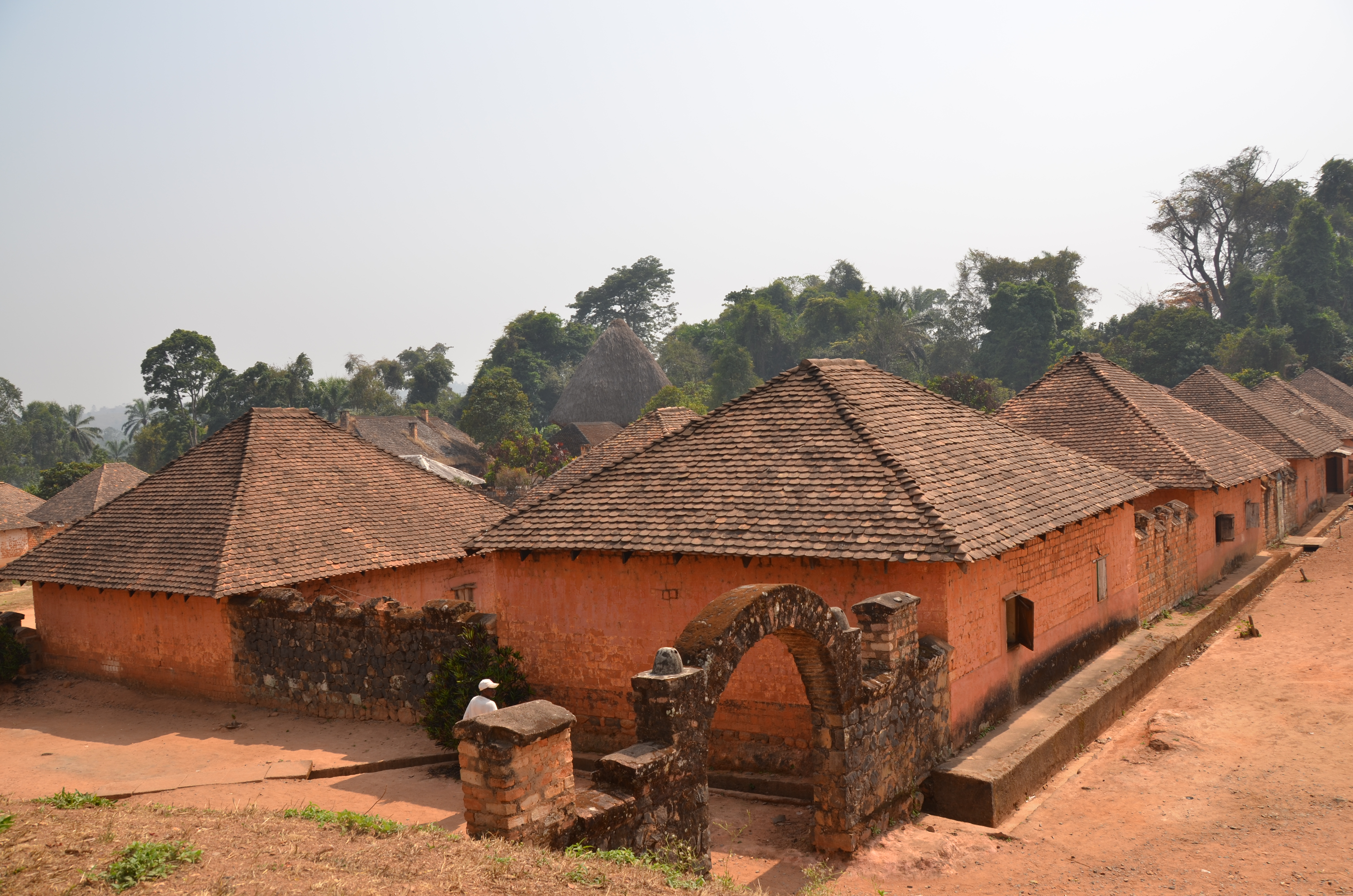
Women houses in the Palace

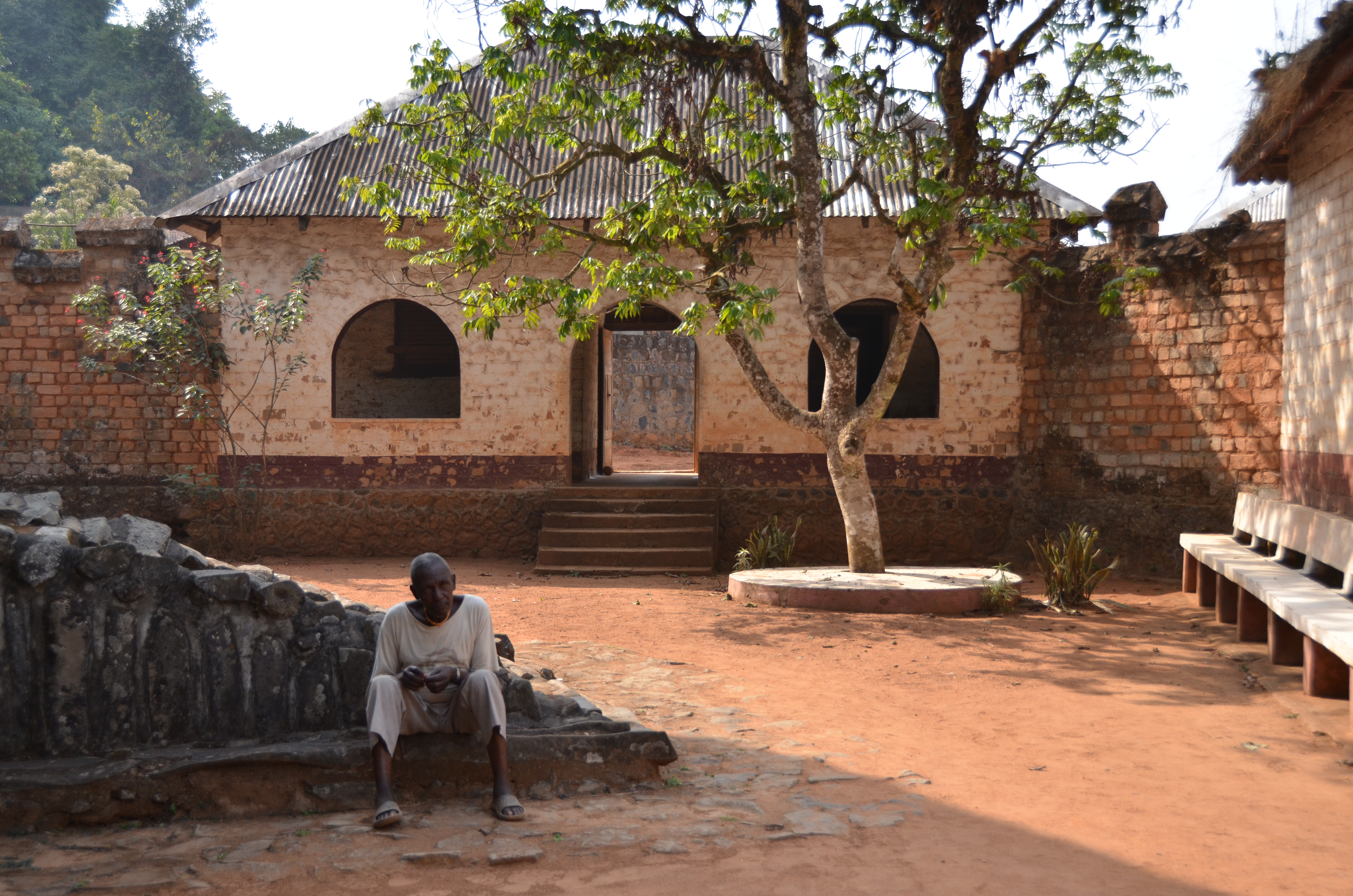
Interior place of the Palace

== Local government ==
=== Traditional power structures ===
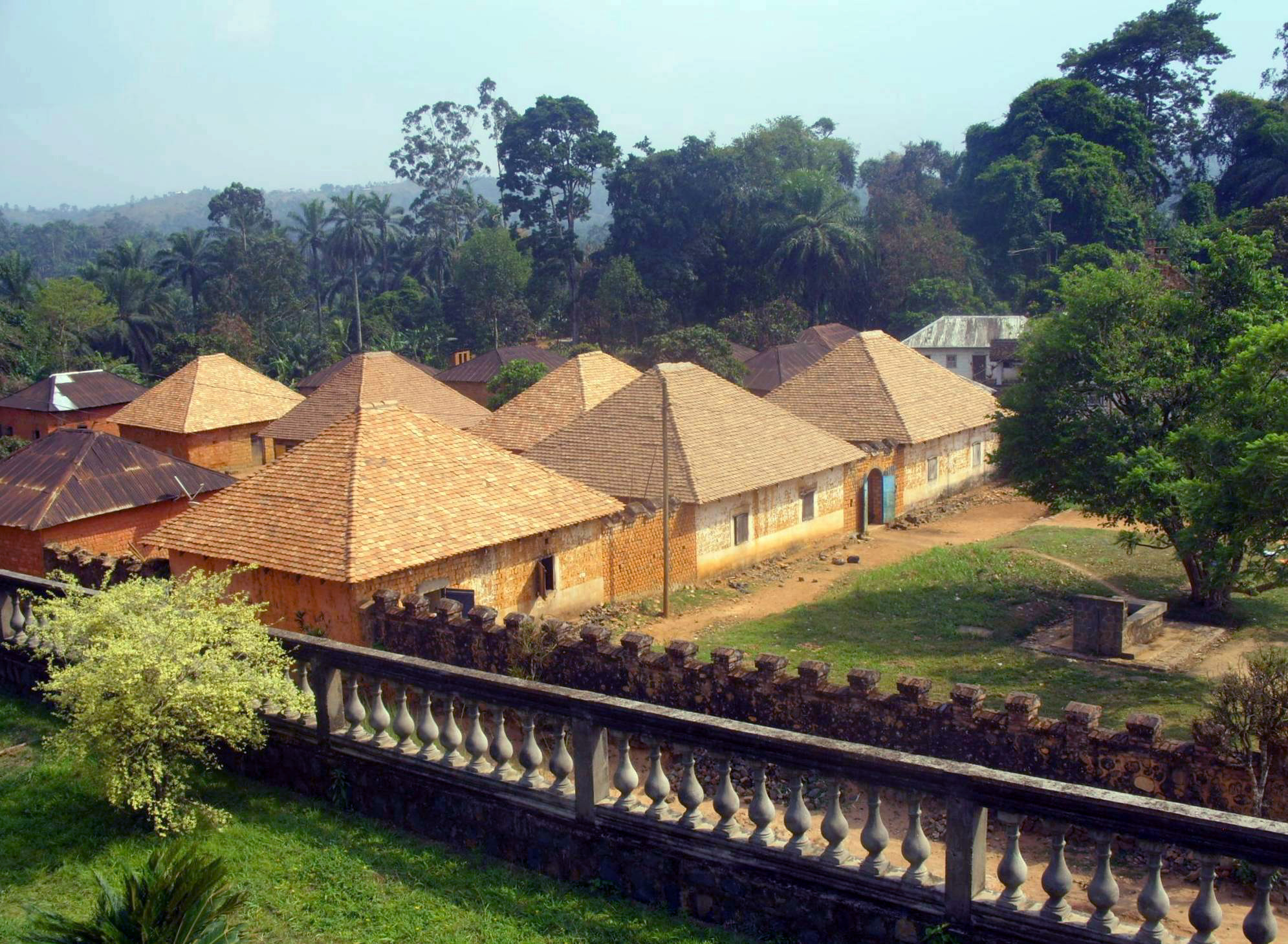
View from the Fon's Palace, Bafut.

Bafut is one of the two regions in Cameroon (the other being Bali, Cameroon), where traditional power structures are still in place. Bafut is a chiefdom or fondom. It was long the centre of the local kingdom of the Tikar people (originally from the Northern regions of Lake Chad), and is presently administered by the Fon of Bafut.

The Fon of Bafut was, and to some extent still is, the paramount Fon of the region, with all other Fons pledging allegiance to him.

The Fon shared power with a council of elders or "Kwifor". Membership was restricted to commoners who had attained the rank of Bukum (sing. Nkum). The strength of Kwifor lay in its role as a council of kingmakers and was thus a check on royal power.

=== Bafut Council ===
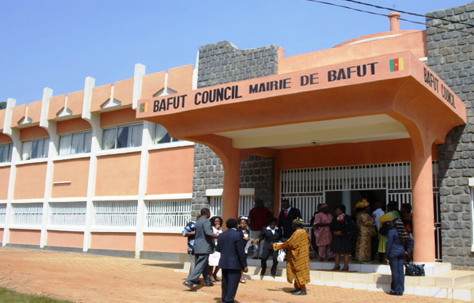
The Bafut Council Building.

The Bafut Council was created by a presidential decree on 23 November 1993 to promote local development and improve the living conditions of the region's inhabitants.

The local government began operation in 1996, following municipal elections. The council, situated at Njinteh Bafut, is intended to be a meeting point of modern local democratic governance and traditional customs. It is made up of the Bafut first class Fondom and the Mundum’s I and II autonomous second class Fondoms who share powers with the council.

Since its creation, the Bafut council has been concentrating its efforts on the provision of water to the surrounding villages, improving the roads and infrastructure that connect the farmlands to the village markets, planting a council forest and improving local health centres. The national government of Cameroon has worked towards transferring some responsibilities and local resources to the country's councils, making the region's councils a focal point for orientation and management of local development. However, the council personnel have suffered from deficient capacities for the appropriate functioning of council institutions.

The Bafut council has just completed a community-driven sustainable development plan with qualitative and quantitative needs of the villages within the council, that would facilitate the proper orientation and management of the development of the council area. Very aware of the limitations in its resources, the Council has been working to build public–private partnerships to be better able to use its resources for local development of the council area in an environmentally sustainable way. In its sustainable development work, the council has strongly partnered with an indigenous Cameroonian NGO, BetterWorld Cameroon (BWC).

=== Mayor ===
Mayor Ngwasoh Abel Langsi, originally a trained educationalist and a science teacher, was elected in July 2007 along with 4 deputy mayors and 35 councillors. His term of office ran up until 2014.

The Mayor demonstrated an interest in pursuing sustainable development in Bafut, working on empowering local Cameroonian youth through the creation of Green Jobs and developing projects such as the Bafut Ecovillage project and the Green Heart of Bafut conceived with Ecovillage Designer Joshua Konkankoh. The latter programme (through its reforestation projects, especially on the upper mountain slopes) has intended to combat severe soil erosion and re-establish degraded water catchments, and thus to protect the huge farmlands located in the lower valleys of Bafut. The newly established council industrial nursery employs local youth to reforest the mountaintops, water catchments, and town streets, additionally aiming to fight the spread of malaria and cholera, as well as to serve as a template for similar projects in the neighbouring communes. Together with Better World Cameroon NGO, he also established a climate change and agricultural research unit within the council, to educate farmers and local youth on the most productive and sustainable modern farming techniques.

He also joined the World Mayors Council on Climate Change, ICLEI – Local Governments for Sustainability, and been described by the Cameroon government as a "national green hero".

=== The Bafut Ecovillage Project ===
The Bafut Ecovillage Project is an initiative founded by Konkankoh Joshua in 2013 as a grassroots effort to address youth unemployment and promote sustainable development in Cameroon. Its Ndanifor Permaculture Ecovillage model site served as a training center based on a concept of "Permaculture the African Way," which blends indigenous and modern knowledge. In 2015, the project won the Gaia Trust Excellence Award, recognizing it as the most inspiring project of the Global Ecovillage Network (GEN).

The project's on-site operations were halted by the Anglophone Crisis. In January 2021, the site was burned down, and its founder, Konkankoh Joshua, was forced into exile.

Following his displacement, Joshua became a refugee in Portugal. The operational focus has since shifted from Cameroon to Europe, where he has established new organizations, including the African Way Association and Indigenous and Modern. The current work of these organizations involves advocacy, consulting, and laying the groundwork to establish a new hub in Portugal.

The stated goal for this European hub is to teach regenerative agriculture and build the "South-North" partnerships. While the long-term vision to eventually rebuild the Bafut Ecovillage in Cameroon remains, there is no evidence that physical reconstruction or agricultural work has resumed at the original site.

== Bafut in popular culture ==
Bafut is known for:

- Being the venue of the Annual Dance of the Fon (local chieftain) or the Abin e Mfor.
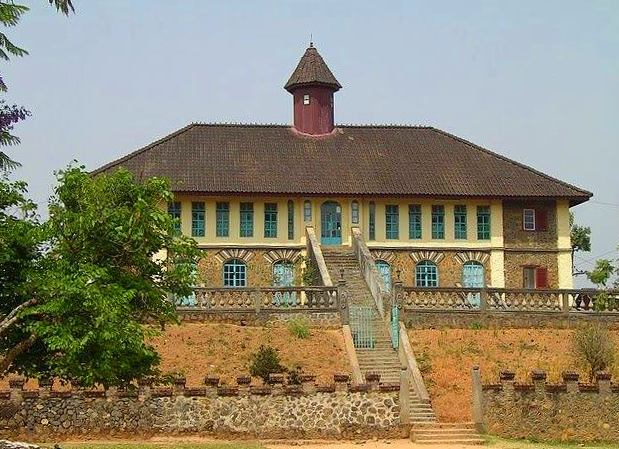
- Front view of Bafut Museum
  The location of the palace of the Fon of Bafut, the residential dwelling of the Fon and his wives and counsel which is now a UNESCO World Heritage Centre and houses a museum (see Fon of Bafut for a section on the Palace of the Fon)
- Better World Cameroon's Ndanifor Permaculture Ecovillage Demonstration Land Trust in Bawum is a major contributor to the operations of the Bafut Ecovillage Vision 2020 working with the aim of reconnecting Bafut Youth to their cultural heritage, and with the goal of striking a balance between economic, social and environmental needs.
- Bafut Council-Better World Cameroon joined Action in Ecovillage Vision 2020 is to actively promote culture, indigenous knowledge systems related to soil fertility, providing rehabilitation and long-term care to plants and animals through a climate campaign. Better World Cameroon works closely with the Cameroon government and Global Ecovillage Network Africa to protect natural heritage sites through Permaculture Education and Social support. Since 2000 Better World Cameroon has adopted Bafut and devoted to transitioning it to resilience. Bafut Permaculture Ecovillage as support structure for implementing Bafut Ecovision 2020 and the Sustainable Development Goals in Cameroon envisions Bafut as a centre for international partnerships.
- The nearby location of the botanical garden of Savanna Botanic Gardens, which noted naturalist Ngwa Che Francis helped plan, is located near the town.
- The presence of the Bafut market, which is a very vibrant one in the area, occurring every eight days, selling fruits, spices, vegetables, meat and animals.

The town of Bafut is probably best remembered as the place where the famous naturalist Gerald Durrell came on two animal-collecting expeditions in 1949 and 1957. Durrell wrote two accounts – The Bafut Beagles and A Zoo in My Luggage – on his travels in Bafut, and created a mini-TV series, To Bafut with Beagles.

== See also ==
- Fon (Cameroon)
- Traditional administrative system of Bafut
