= Asong =

Asong may refer to:

- Asong Subdistrict
- Asong (surname)
