= Linus Asong =

Novelist from the British Southern Cameroons

Linus Tongwo Asong
- Born: 1947; Lewoh, Lebialem, British Southern Cameroons
- Died: July 16, 2012 (aged 64–65); Mbingo Hospital, Cameroon
- Occupations: Professor of English Literature and Creative Writing at the University of Bamenda (1984–2012)
- Writing career
- Notable works: No Way to Die; A Legend of the Dead; Osagyefo : the great betrayal Detective fiction & the African scene Doctor Frederick Ngenito; Akroma File

Linus Tongwo Asong was a novelist from the British Southern Cameroons. Born in 1947 in Lewoh (Fotabong) in the former British Southern Cameroons at the end of the Second World War, he became known as an intellectual, novelist, painter, literary critic, publisher and comedian. He died at Mbingo Hospital on Monday, July 16, 2012, at about 1:00 p.m. WAT. He had just retired from the University of Bamenda in June 2012 and was about to take up a position as a Dean at the Catholic University of Cameroon, Bamenda. He also worked with his nephew, Januarius Jingwa Asongu to get Saint Monica University off the ground, a project that his daughter, Laura Asong, helped bring to reality. He was married to Teresa Ajab Asong and had three children - Laura, Stephen, and Edward.

== Education ==
After primary education, he was admitted into the St. Joseph's College, Sasse (Buea), where he earned the General Certificate of Education (GCE) Ordinary Level before proceeding to the Cameroon College of Arts, Science and Technology (CCAST) Bambili, where he earned the GCE Advanced Level. After high school, he was admitted into the University of Cape Coast, Ghana, where he did a degree in education, specializing in the teaching of English. Upon his return to the Cameroons, he taught in French-speaking Cameroun for a few years before earning a scholarship to study creative arts in Canada following an exhibition of his paintings in Yaounde. In 1980, he studied at the University of Windsor, Canada where he earned a Master in Creative Writing. He then enrolled at the University of Alberta, in Edmonton Canada where he earned an MA and a PhD in Comparative Literature. He returned to Cameroon in 1984 and began teaching English Literature at E.N.S Annexe, Bambili, a branch of the University of Yaounde I, which later became part of the University of Bamenda.

== Works ==
L.T. Asong wrote several books, mostly novels, including:

- The Akroma File
- Chopchair
- The Crabs of Bangui
- The Crown of Thorns
- Detective Fiction and The African Scene
- Doctor Frederick Ngenito
- Laughing Store
- A Legend of the Dead
- Ndeh Ntumazah
- No Way to Die
- Osagyefo. The Great Betrayal
- Psychological Constructs and the Craft of African Fiction of Yesteryears
- Salvation Colony
- A Stranger in his Homeland
