= Achirimbi II =

Fon of Bafut from 1932 to 1968

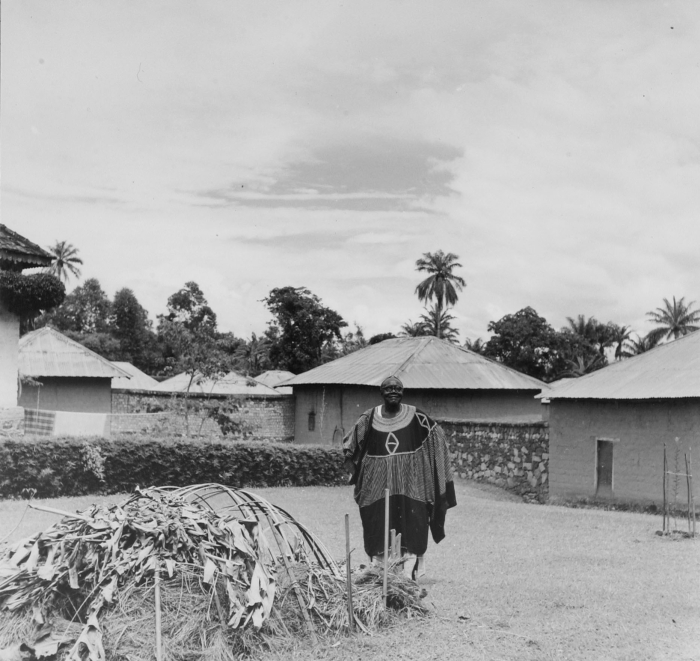
Achirimbi II posing next to his termite trap (1965).

Achirimbi II was the tenth Fon ("King") who ruled over the town of Bafut and adjoining areas (the Fondom of Bafut) in a semi-autonomous fashion. His reign lasted from 1932 to 1968, and included the time of handover from the British trust territory of Southern Cameroons, part of British Cameroons to the independent Cameroon. He was preceded by Abumbi I and succeeded by Abumbi II.

He alienated himself from other Fons by being sympathetic to the British cause. He was awarded a Certificate of Honour in 1946 by the British government 'as a record of the valuable services rendered by him to his own country and people and to the British Government... and loyal services given to the Administration in the maintenance of good order'.

Achirimbi II took advantage of his favourable standing with the administration and sought compensation for loss of sovereignty to arrogate to himself the residual powers the sub-chiefs or the Atangchuo, had retained over land matters and other disputes.

He was befriended by the famous naturalist Gerald Durrell, who visited Bafut on his animal-collecting expeditions twice, in 1949 and 1957. The Fon helped Durrell substantially in these expeditions. The books written by Durrell about these expeditions, The Bafut Beagles and A Zoo in My Luggage, portray the Fon mostly in a humorous fashion, lampooning his polygamy, anglophile perspective, and high tolerance for alcohol, but also in more flattering ways. The Fon awarded Durrell the ceremonial dress and staff during his second expedition.

Fon Achirimbi II is famous for having remarked about the choice to join independent Cameroon or independent Nigeria from the British Cameroons in 1961, saying it was a choice between the "Fire and the Deep Sea".

He was considered by many as being progressive and willing to experiment with new ideas. He was treated with respect by both colonial administrators and nationalist politicians.

Preceded by Abumbi I	Fon of Bafut; 1932–1968	Succeeded by Abumbi II
