= Asong (surname) =

Asong is a surname. Notable people with the surname include:

- Clovis Asong (born 1994), British sprinter
- Linus Asong (1947–2012), British Cameroon novelist
- Michael Asong (born 1998), Filipino professional footballer

== See also ==
- Asong Subdistrict, in Yala Province, Thailand
