= Republican Television Network =

- Country of origin: Cameroon
- Original language: French

Production
- Production location: Bamenda

Republican Television Network (RTN) formerly ANTV (Afrique Nouvelle Television) started broadcast in 2002 and like the radio arm was the first private TV station in the West Region of Cameroon. Its headquarters is in Bamenda at Ntamulung in the heart of the town. It currently relays Voice of America's (VOA) following a partnership signed in 2003.
