= Theresia Nkuo-Akenji =

Cameroonian Academician

Vice-Chancellor
- Incumbent
- Assumed office 27 November 2015

Personal details
- Born: Cameroon
- Education: St. Mary-of-the-Woods College (BSc) University at Buffalo (MSc) Louisiana State University (PhD)
- Occupation: Academic administrator, parasitologist

Theresia Nkuo-Akenji is a Cameroonian academic administrator, parasitologist, and immunologist who has served as the Vice-Chancellor of the University of Bamenda since November 27, 2015. She previously held senior leadership roles at the University of Buea, including Dean of the Faculty of Health Sciences and Deputy Vice-Chancellor for Internal Control. She equally serves as Board Chair of the Regional Universities Forum for Capacity Building in Agriculture (RUFURUM) a consortium of 173 universities across 40 African countries, and as 1st Vice President of the Association of African Universities.

== Early life and education ==
Nkuo-Akenji was born in Cameroon and she earned a Bachelor of Science (BSc) in Medical Technology from St. Mary-of-the-Woods College in Terre Haute, Indiana, United States. She then obtained a Master's degree in Microbiology from the University at Buffalo, followed by a PhD in Parasitology and Immunology from Louisiana State University.

== Academic career ==
Nkuo-Akenji joined the University of Buea, Cameroon's first English-language university, as a lecturer in 1993. During her stays un the institution, she assumed different positions, including the Head of the Department of Life Sciences, Vice-Dean of Student Affairs and Records in the Faculty of Science, Dean of the Faculty of Science, and Dean of the Faculty of Health Sciences. From 2013 to 2015, she served as Deputy Vice-Chancellor in Charge of Internal Control and Evaluation. In 2015, Nkuo-Akenji was appointed the inaugural Vice-Chancellor of the University of Bamenda.

== Publications ==
She is a researcher with several contributions in the area of Immunology of Malaria and interactions of malaria parasites with other tropical disease pathogens.

- Tembei, A. M., Kengne-Ouafo, J. A., John, B., Nji, T. M., Enyong, P., Nkuo-Akenji, T., Davey, G., & Wanji, S. (2022). An analysis of social dimensions of podoconiosis and leprosy on affected households in endemic health districts of the North West Region of Cameroon. SSM - Population Health, 19, 101187. https://doi.org/10.1016/j.ssmph.2022.101187
- Njua-Yafi, C., Nkuo-Akenji, T., Anchang-Kimbi, J., Apinjoh, T., Mugri, R., Chi, H., Tata, R., Njumkeng, C., Dodoo, D., Theisen, M., & Achidi, E. (2017). The Effect of Helminth Co-Infection on Malaria-Specific Immunoglobulin G Responses. BMJ Global Health, 2(Suppl 2), A66.2-A66. https://doi.org/10.1136/bmjgh-2016-000260.178
- Akenji, T. N., Ntonifor, N., Ching, J., Kimbi, H., Ndamukong, K., Anong, D., Boyo, M., & Titanji, V. (2005). Evaluating a malaria intervention strategy using knowledge, practices and coverage surveys in rural Bolifamba, southwest Cameroon. Transactions of the Royal Society of Tropical Medicine and Hygiene, 99(5), 325–332. https://doi.org/10.1016/j.trstmh.2003.12.016
- Ayukekbong, J., Kabayiza, J., Lindh, M., Nkuo-Akenji, T., Tah, F., Bergström, T., & Norder, H. (2013). Shift of Enterovirus species among children in Cameroon – Identification of a new enterovirus, EV-A119. Journal of Clinical Virology, 58(1), 227–232. https://doi.org/10.1016/j.jcv.2013.07.005
