= Fon of Bafut =

The Fon of Bafut is the fon or Mfor (traditional ruler) of the town of Bafut and its adjoining areas in the Northwest Province, Cameroon, which comprise the erstwhile Fondom of Bafut. At present, the Fon of Bafut is still a local ruler, but under the jurisdiction of the Government of Cameroon, and a board of Fons. Bafut is one of the largest villages in the North West Province.

Once autocratic, the Fondom of Bafut was turned into a part of the German protectorate of Cameroon (Kamerun Schutzgebiet) due to increasing tension, military conflict, and finally defeat at the hands of the Germans in the Bafut Wars (1901–1907) during the reign of Abumbi I. After World War I, the Fon of Bafut and his people became part of the British mandated territory of the Cameroons or British Cameroon.

== International image ==
The Fon of Bafut is perhaps best remembered due to Gerald Durrell's humorous portrayal of the Fon Achirimbi II in his books describing animal-collecting missions to Bafut in the 1940s and 1950s – Bafut Beagles and A Zoo in My Luggage.

== Traditional role of the Fon ==
The Fon had titular powers in pre-independent Cameroon. He had multifarious functions:

- He controlled external relations and internally he made laws.
- All justice was done in his name, and he was the final court of appeal and had power of life and death over his subjects.
- As chief priest he offered sacrifices to his ancestors and interceded with them for the welfare of the people. He presided at important festivals, the most important being the Abin e Mfor, the dance of the Fon.

The Fon was assisted and advised by titled royals – the most prominent among them being the Mamfor or the mother of the Fon, either his real mother or a sister. In addition there were two fraternal assistants called Ndimfor (the elder brother) and Muma (younger brother). However, none of these royals served as regent in the case of the Fon's death or indisposition.

The body which actually shared power with the Fon and deputised for him was the council of elders or Kwifor. The strength of the Kwifor lay in its role as a council of kingmakers; it was thus a check on royal power. The Fon acknowledged this and tried as much as possible to avoid confrontation with the Kwifor.

== Role of the Fon during the colonial era ==
The Germans tried to put a puppet ruler in place of the Fon after the Bafut Wars, but failed. The Fon Abumbi I was openly hostile to the Germans, and diplomacy was not pursued.

The idea of decentralised governance by local people was put into practice in July 1917 in the British Cameroon when the District officer inaugurated an 'Instructional Court' in Bamenda. This was an assembly of chiefs from surrounding communities who were summoned to be instructed in the new native court ordinance and to go on to form the new courts. The membership of the court consisted of 27 chiefs with the Fon of Bafut Abumbi I appointed as president due to his role as the "supreme fon".

The court proved only mildly successful, but his son Achirimbi II was very tolerant of the British. He alienated himself from other Fons by being sympathetic to the British cause and was awarded a Certificate of Honour by the British government 'as a record of the valuable services rendered by him to his own country and people and to the British Government... and loyal services given to the Administration in the maintenance of good order'.

== Role of the Fon in the post-colonial period ==
Even in the post colonial period, the Fon of Bafut has been an important administrative force. When asked whether to join the independent country of Cameroon from the British Cameroons, Fon Achirimbi II famously said that it was a choice between the "Fire and the Deep Sea".

Bafut is one of many places in Northwest and West Cameroon where traditional power structures are still in place. The Fon of Bafut also holds several important administrative positions including that of the head of the North West Fons' Union (NOWEFU), and member of the Management Board of the North-West Development Authority (MIDENO).

== Ceremonies involving the Fon ==
The Fon participates in virtually all the important ceremonies of Bafut. Some of the most important ones are:

- The stoning ceremony: When a new Fon takes over, he is presented to the Bafut population for "stoning". The population may decide to throw token pebbles at him or choose to hurt him by throwing large stones. While a token ceremony now, this ceremony may have served some purposes of democracy and election early on.
- The annual grasscutting ceremony: This takes place at the end of the dry season, around late April. The entire community goes to the surrounding grasslands to collect bundles of dry grass for rethatching the important buildings in the palace complex (notably the Achum), trooping in front of the Fon with their offerings. The festival typically ends with a gala feast accompanied by palm wine.
- The annual dance Abin e Mfor or Dance of the Fon: This annual event, held in December is also known as the Abin Lela, or Dance of the Flutes. Village nobles play traditional flutes and fire guns to mark the proceedings. It is the climactic point of the annual ritual cycle, and is supposed to signify the death and rebirth of the year (i.e. a new year ceremony). The ethnic dance is performed in traditional dress. The basic structure of the dance is:
  - Luminaries of society (the Fon of Bafut and his advisors) form a spiral in the centre.
  - The general public dance concentric rings around the spiral in a counter-clockwise fashion.

Present-day African American ring ceremonies probably owe their origins to such ceremonies.

The grass-cutting ceremony and the annual dance were described by Gerald Durrell in detail in his accounts The Bafut Beagles, and A Zoo in My Luggage.

== The palace of the Fon ==
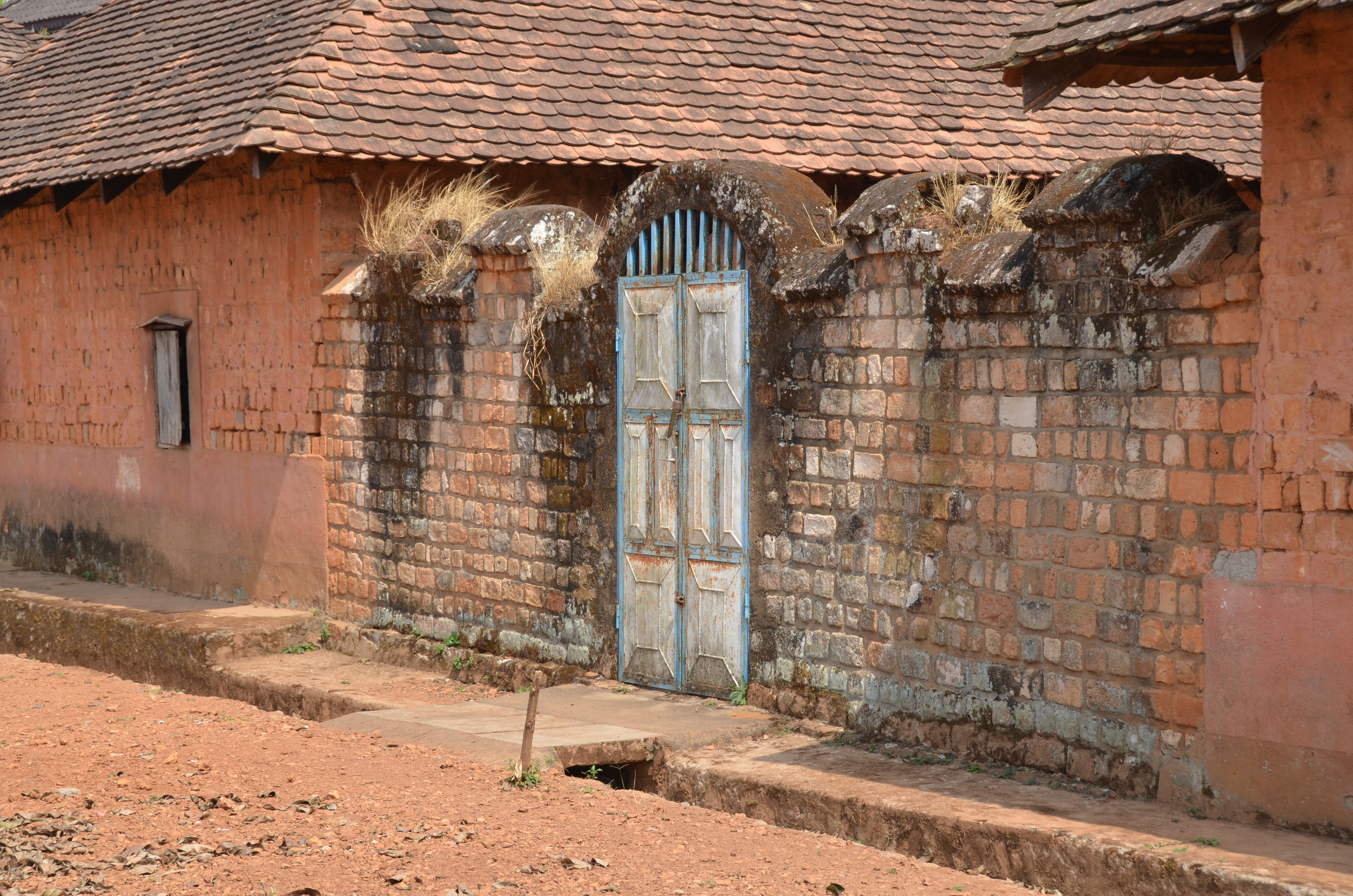
The Fon's palace at Bafut was listed as one of the 100 most endangered monument sites in 2006

The palace of the Fon of Bafut or Ntoh is a major tourist attraction and is listed in the 2006 World Monuments Watch list of the 100 most endangered sites of 2006 by the World Monuments Fund.

The original palace was built out of wood and liana. The complex and the central shrine were burnt to the ground by the Germans in the Bafut Wars, but was rebuilt over the period 1907 – 1910 with help from the Germans after the signing of the peace treaty. Its buildings represent both colonial influences and indigenous vernacular architectural styles, and are mostly made of fired bricks covered by tiles. The residence built by the Germans for the Fon presently serve as the guest house, and also houses a museum. Fon Abumbi II has declared that the museum will feature relics from the Battle of Mankon (1891), of the Bafut Wars, when warriors from Bafut routed a German expeditionary force.

Only one building from the original palace stands – it is supposed to shelter the spirit of the Fon's ancestors. It is the Achum – the old palace, and has a striking architecture with its pyramidal thatched roof. Only the Fon and some village notables are allowed entry into the Achum.

There are two other older palaces of the Fon of Bafut.

- The old palace of Mbebli, also known as Ntoh Firloo, was built by the Bafut people when they first arrived from Tikari some 400 years ago. It contains the tombs of the first three Bafut kings Firloo, Nebasi Suh and Ambebi. Libation for the famous Bafut annual dance "Abin e Mfor" begins here.
- The palace at Njibujang contains the tomb of the 8th King of Bafut Achirimbi I.

== List of the Fons of Bafut ==
#	Royal name (Personal Name)	Lifespan	Reign	Notes
1	Feurlu	unknown	1516 – 1552 36 years	
2	Nebasi Suh	unknown	1552 – 1570 18 years	
3	Ambebi Ferh	unknown	1570 – 1635 65 years	
4	Nebanfor	unknown	1635 – 1677 42 years	
5	Chunga	unknown	1677 – 1708 31 years	
6	Ngwa Abi-Fu (Sulem)	unknown	1708 – 1752 44 years	
7	Tumfong (Njwabi)	unknown	1752 – 1799 47 years	
8	Achirimbi I	? - 1852 or c. 1884	1799 – 1852 or c. 1884 53 years? or 85 years?	
9	Abumbi I	? - August 1932	1852 or c. 1884 – August 1932 80 years? or 48 years?	resisted German rule for 6 years, eventually captured and dethroned
10	Achirimbi II (Su Ayieh)	? – December 1968	August 1932 – December 1968; 36 years	
11	Abumbi II	1951 – present	December 1968 – present 57 years, 260 days	
