= Traditional administrative system of Bafut =

The Fondom of Bafut political system, in Northwest Province of Cameroon, centred on the Fon or Mfor who was the fount of the political and religious life of the people.

The Fon had multifarious functions:

- He controlled external relations and internally he made laws.
- All justice was done in his name, he was the final court of appeal and had power of life and death over his subjects.
- As chief priest he offered sacrifices to his ancestors and interceded with them for the welfare of the people. He presided at important festivals, the most important being the Abin e Mfor, the dance of the Fon.

The Fon was assisted and advised by titled royals.

The most prominent among them was the Mamfor, the mother of the Fon, either his real mother or a sister.

In addition there were two fraternal assistants called Ndimfor (the elder brother) and Muma (younger brother). However, none of these royals served as regent in the case of the Fon's death or indisposition.

The body which actually shared power with the Fon and deputised for him was the council of elders or Kwifor. Kwifor means holder or supporter of the Fon but its role was far more pervasive. Membership was restricted to commoners who had attained the rank of Bukum (sing. Nkum). The strength of Kwifor lay in its role as a council of kingmakers and was thus a check on royal power. The Fon acknowledged this and tried as much as possible to avoid confrontation.

== The Kwifor ==
The Kwifor assisted the Fon in the judicial investigation of serious cases which could not be dealt with at family, quarter or village levels. When investigations were completed the Fon delivered judgement but Kwifor would undertake its execution.

One may broadly divide the chiefdom into two in order to understand its local administration:

- Firstly, there were semi-autonomous settlements, each with its locally appointed Atangchuo (planner of war). These were linked to the centre through tribute paid in the form of the specialised product (palm oil, raffia wine, fish, etc.) for which the village was noted.
- Secondly, there were those settlements mostly around the palace and directly under the authority of the Fon. These settlements had no hereditary chiefs but instead each had an appointed head, Tanukuru (father of the village), appointed by the Fon from among the bukum. In some cases a son of the Fon might be appointed.

The Tanukuru, along with the other bukum, constituted a governing council – the Butabunukuru.
