= Mezam =

- Department
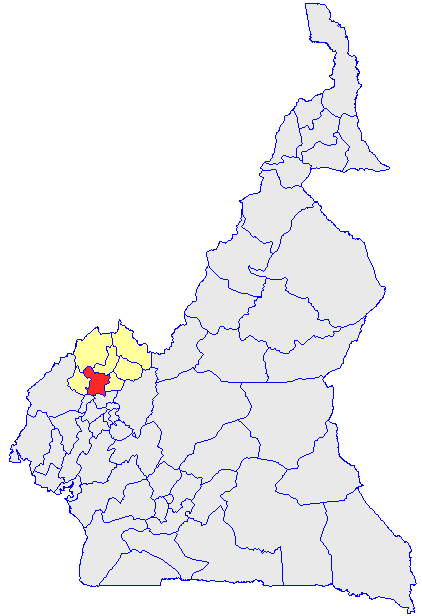
- Department location in Cameroon
- Coordinates: 6.0771°N 10.3594°E
- Country: Cameroon
- Province: Northwest Region
- Capital: Bamenda

Area
  - Total: 674 sq mi (1,745 km^{2})

Population (2005)
  - Total: 524,127
- Time zone: UTC+1 (WAT)

Mezam is a division of the North West Region of Cameroon. The department covers an area of 1745 km^{2} and as of 2005 had a total population of 524,127. The capital of the department lies at Bamenda.

== Subdivisions ==
The department is divided administratively into 5 communes and in turn into villages. The Abakwa Central district is further divided into 3 sub-districts, namely Bamenda I, Bamenda II and Bamenda III.

=== Communes ===
District	Capital	Area (km^{2})
Bafut	Bafut	486.1
Bali-Nyonga	Bali	111.3
Abakwa Central	Bamenda	329.58
Santa	Santa	532.9
Tubah	Tubah	388.9
