= Bali, Cameroon =

Bali
- Location in Cameroon
- Coordinates: 5°53′N 10°01′E
- Country: Cameroon
- Province: Northwest
- Department: Mezam

Population (2001)
  - Total: 32,000 (est)

Bali is a town and commune in Cameroon, lying west of Bamenda. It has a population of 32,000 (2001 estimate). Formerly the centre of a kingdom, it is known for its palace and its regular festival.

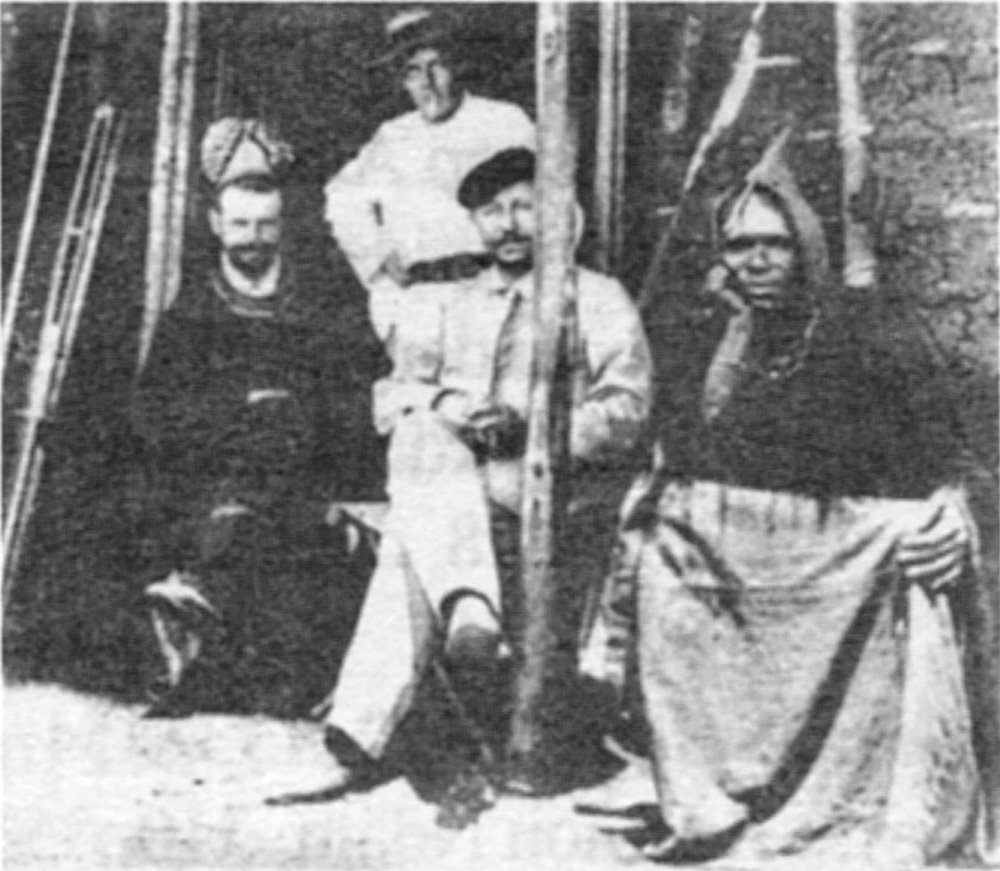
German explorer Eugen Zintgraff and Galega I, fon of Bali, Cameroon.
