= Operation Free Bafut =

Part of the Anglophone Crisis in Cameroon

- Part of the Anglophone Crisis
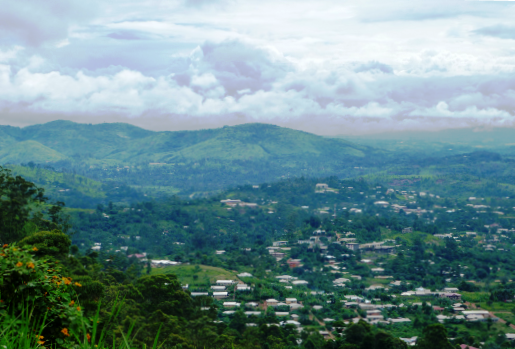
- View of the village of Bafut
Date	26 April – 1 May 2020
Location	Bafut, Northwest Region, Cameroon
Result	Armed separatists weakened but not expelled entirely from Bafut

Belligerents
Cameroon	Ambazonia

Commanders and leaders
Col. Alain Charles Matiang	General Peace Plant †; General Alhaji †

Units involved
Rapid Intervention Battalion; 501st Airforce Base; Motorized Infantry Brigade	Seven Karta

Strength
More than 300 soldiers	Unknown

Casualties and losses
None dead, some wounded (Cameroonian claim); Unknown number dead or wounded (separatist claim)	15 dead (Cameroonian claim, confirmed by separatists)
- 13 civilians dead (according to locals); No civilian casualties (Cameroonian claim)

Operation Free Bafut was a week-long Cameroonian military operation against the Seven Karta militia in and around Bafut that resulted in the deaths of two separatist generals.

== Background ==
Following the beginning of an armed rebellion in the Anglophone areas of Cameroon, Bafut quickly became a battleground between separatist forces and the Cameroonian military. Local taxi operators who lost their livelihood due to the conflict organized the "Seven Karta" militia around 2017/18, and occupied parts of the region. Government troops raided the Bafut Royal Palace at least twice in 2018 and 2019, both times claiming to search for armed separatists. Though no rebels were found in either raid, the soldiers used the occasions to burn part of the palace, loot its museum, and injured the Fon's brother.

== Battle ==
The operation was launched on 26 April, with the official aim of expelling the Seven Karta militia from Bafut. The operation involved more than 300 soldiers, and consisted of a series of raids on separatist camps. Throughout the first day of the operation, several people were arrested while one civilian was killed. One of the main aims of the operation was to secure Saddle Ranch hotel, a tourist site which armed separatists had turned into a base. The operation also involved a raid inside the palace of the Fon of Bafut. Separatists claimed that the palace was damaged during the operation, though the Cameroonian military denied these charges.

On 1 May, the Cameroonian Army announced the deaths of two separatist generals known as General Peace Plant and General Alhaji. The Cameroonian Army also captured weapons, ammunition, six motorbikes, a vehicle and two horses from the separatists.

== Casualties ==
The Cameroonian Army claimed that no civilians had been killed during the fighting. This was disputed by local villagers, who claimed that 13 civilians had died. The Cameroonian Army announced that it had killed 15 separatists, including the two generals; this was not disputed by the separatists, who in turn claimed to have inflicted losses on the Cameroonian Army. Cameroon claimed that only a few of its soldiers had been wounded.

== Aftermath ==
Operation Free Bafut succeeded in weakening the separatists in the area, but did not spell a definite end of separatist activity in Bafut. In November, Cameroonian soldiers re-invaded the town and burned down several houses.
