= Bafut Wars =

Conflicts involving the German Empire

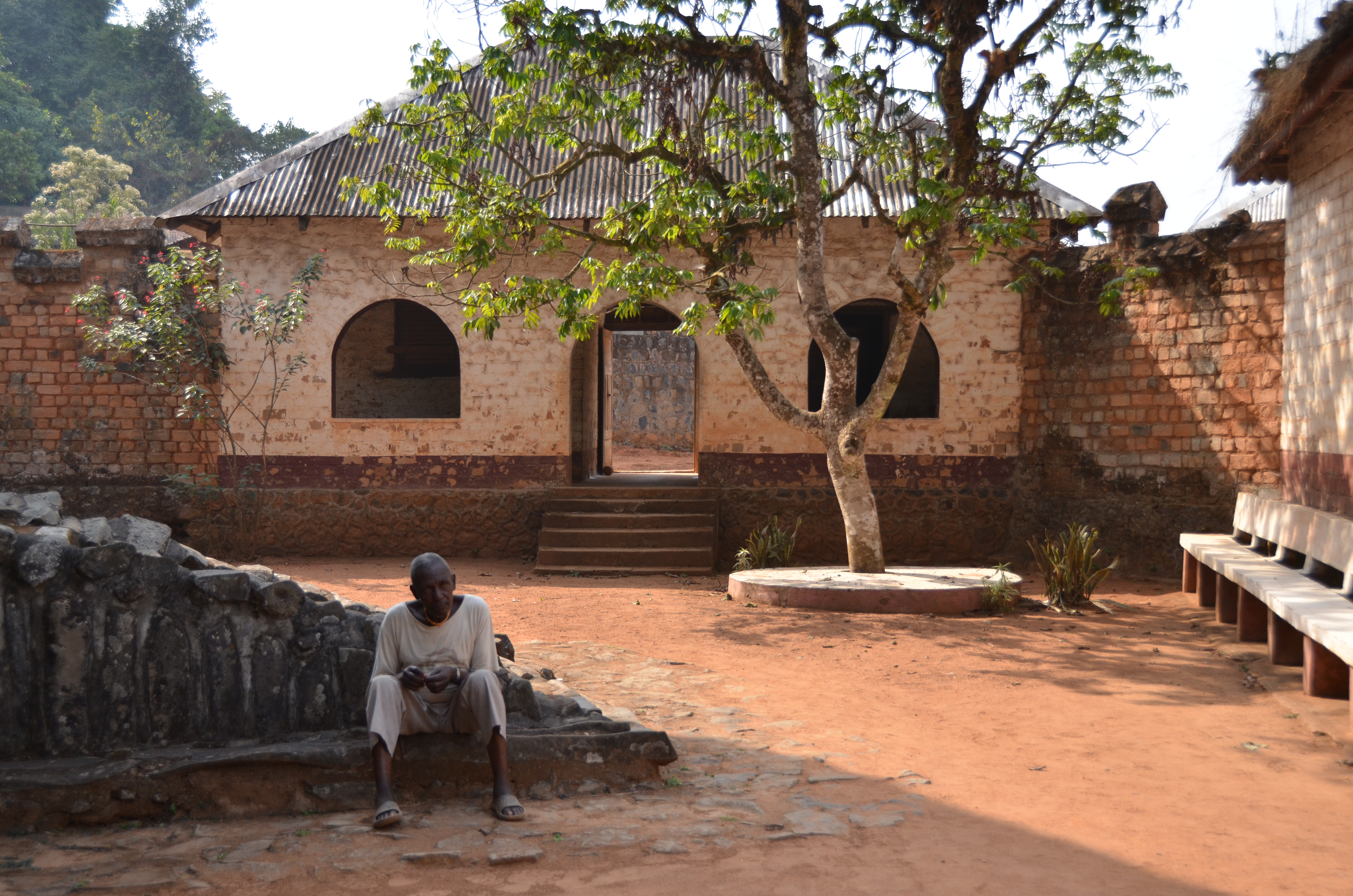
Bafut Kingdom Palace

The Bafut Wars were a series of wars fought in the early 20th century between the troops of the Fon of Bafut and German-backed troops of neighbouring fondoms and German troops. The wars ultimately led to a defeat for the Fon of Bafut, forcing him into exile, and making the Fondom of Bafut part of the German protectorate of Kamerun.

During the Bafut Wars, the strategic landscape was characterized by two distinct types of settlements. Primarily, there were the semi-autonomous villages, each governed by its own chief known as the atangchuo, who played a crucial role as the war planner. These villages operated with a degree of independence but were intricately linked to the central authority under various conditions that dictated their relationship dynamics. These conditions often influenced alliances, resource sharing, and military strategies during the conflicts that ensued in the region.

== Timeline ==
1889
The German explorer Eugene Zintgraff visits the town of Bafut as one of his punitive expeditions after visiting Bali Nyonga.. Breaches of etiquette by Eugen Zintgraff with respect to the Fon of Bafut Abumbi I was looked upon as deliberately hostile acts instigated by the Fon of Bali Nyonga.

1891
German-led forces from Bali Nyonga attacked Mankon - an ally of Bafut. The attack was a reprisal of the death of two of Eugene Zintgraff's messengers sent to Bafut to demand ivory. The town of Mankon was burnt down by the force on January 31, 1891. Warriors from Bafut and Mankon attacked the attacking force on their return journey and inflicted heavy losses on them. This is the Battle of Mankon.

1901 – 1907
The German Schutztruppe, initially under the Schutztruppe commander von Pavel raided Bafut several times in 1901, 1904–1905 and 1907. This resulted in the exile of the Fon of Bafut Abumbi I to Douala for a year. He was reinstated under German rule as no suitable proxy rulers could be found.

The military headquarters of Abumbi I during the Bafut Wars at Mankaha in Bafut now houses a war memorial to the Bafut people. The guest house (which was the residence for the Fon built by the Germans) at the present palace of the Fon houses a museum. The museum houses a special section on the Battle of Mankon, with the skulls of four dead German soldiers, their arms and ammunition.
