= University of Bamenda =

University in Cameroon

Coordinates: 5.9300°N 10.1700°E

- Motto: "Knowledge, Probity, Entrepreneurship"
- Established: December 2010; 13 years ago
- Vice-Chancellor: Theresia Nkuo-Akenji
- Location: Bamenda, Cameroon
- Campus: Bambili
- Nickname: UBa

The University of Bamenda (UBa) is an Anglophone university in Bamenda, NorthWestern Cameroon.

== History ==
The university opened in 2011 as the second English language university in Cameroon, the University of Buea having been the only one up until then. It began with the Higher Teachers Training College and the Higher Technical Teachers Training College as the only faculties.

== Campus ==
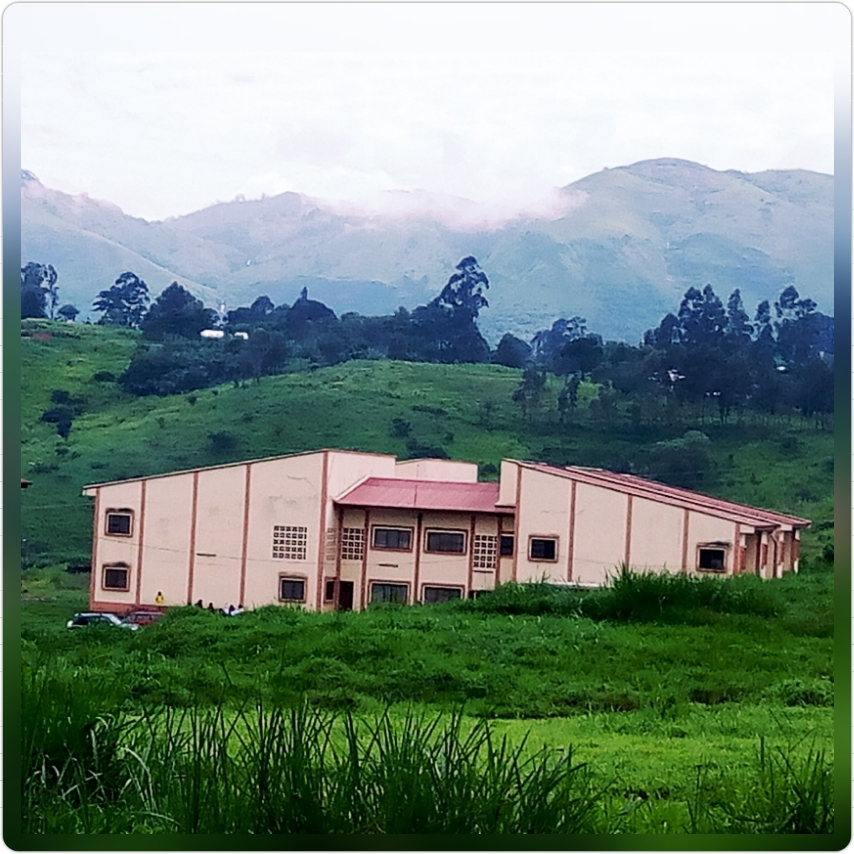
University of Bamenda, Bambili Campus

The main campus of the University of Bamenda is in Bambili, a subdivision in Bamenda, Mezam Division, Northwest region of Cameroon. The village is along the Ring Road northeast of Bamenda. An Anglophone area, many schoolchildren are taught in English, and the use of Pidgin English is widespread. English and Pidgin play a significant role in community life, but the Mbeligi language still maintains its place as the heart language of most Bambili people.

Students in the Faculty of Health Science are currently taking studies at Mile 3 Nkwen Bamenda at the campus between Fonab Polytechnic and Saint Louise Higher Institute of Health.

Bambili is surrounded by a number of related languages (Bambui, Babanki, Bafut, Mankon, Nkwen, Mendakwe and Awing). Mbeligi is the dialect of Bambili, but distinctly related to the other ngemba languages (and each group insists on its independent identity).

== Organisation and administration ==
The top official in the University of Bamenda, like other state universities in Cameroon, is the Minister of Higher Education.

The position is followed by the pro-chancellor and next the vice-chancellor. The vice-chancellor is assisted by the registrar.

The dean and vice-dean are in charge of each faculty.

The university institutes are headed by the director. Each department is controlled by the Head of department. The student administration is headed by a Student Union President.

== Admission ==
Admission into the higher institutes/university colleges in the University of Bamenda is done through competitive entrance exams which involve written and oral examination. Students into other faculties are required to follow a registration procedure which involves presentation of results and study of files.

Candidates are required to have obtained at least two (2) subjects in one sitting or Baccalaureate or its Equivalence GCE Advance level examination.

Candidates are must have at least four (4) subjects or its Equivalence in the GCE Ordinary level examination.

Candidates without a pass in English Language in the GCE O/L or Probatoire are eligible to apply for an “English Language Proficient Test” organized by the University of Bamenda.

A pass in ordinary level English is a major requirement for students from Cameroon. Students from other countries are expected to possess proficiency in the English language; without this requirement, the applicant is automatically disqualified.

== Faculties and schools ==
The University of Bamenda is made up of the following faculties, schools and colleges:

- Faculty of Arts
- Faculty of Law and Political Science (With 4 departments at undergraduate program which are English private law, public law, political science, and French private law.) This faculty also has postgraduate programs in English Law and political science, not living out Capacity in law, which is a program in which students with 4 ordinary-level papers can enroll.
- Faculty of Economics and Management Science
- Faculty of Education
- Faculty of Science
- Faculty of Health science
- The College of Technology
- The Higher Institute of Commerce and Management
- The Higher Institute of Transport and Logistics
- The Higher Teachers’ Training College of Bamenda in Bambili
- The Higher Technical Teachers’ Training College of Bamenda in Bambili
- National Higher Polytechnic Institute (NAHPI, School of Engineering) https://www.nahpi.cm
