= Asong Subdistrict =

Subdistrict in Yala Province

Asong อาซ่อง
- Subdistrict
- Country: Thailand
- Province: Yala
- District: Raman

Population (2005)
  - Total: 5,202
- Time zone: UTC+7 (ICT)

Asong Subdistrict (Thailand)

Asong (Thai: อาซ่อง), is a tambon (subdistrict) of Raman District, Yala Province, Thailand. In 2006, It had a population of 5,202 people.

== Administration ==
The tambon is divided into six administrative villages Mubans.

No.	Name	Thai	Population
1.	Gue Meng	กือเม็ง	833
2.	Yae	แย๊ะ	1,076
3.	Bugae-Bue Rangae	บูเก๊ะบือราแง	528
4.	Jorli Mus	เจาะลีมัส	442
5.	Satoe	สะโต	1,454
6.	Bukoh Lamoh	บูเกาะลาโม๊ะ	399
