= Menchum River =

River in Cameroon

Coordinates: 6.264793°N 10.039787°E

Northwest region. Menchum River in the west.

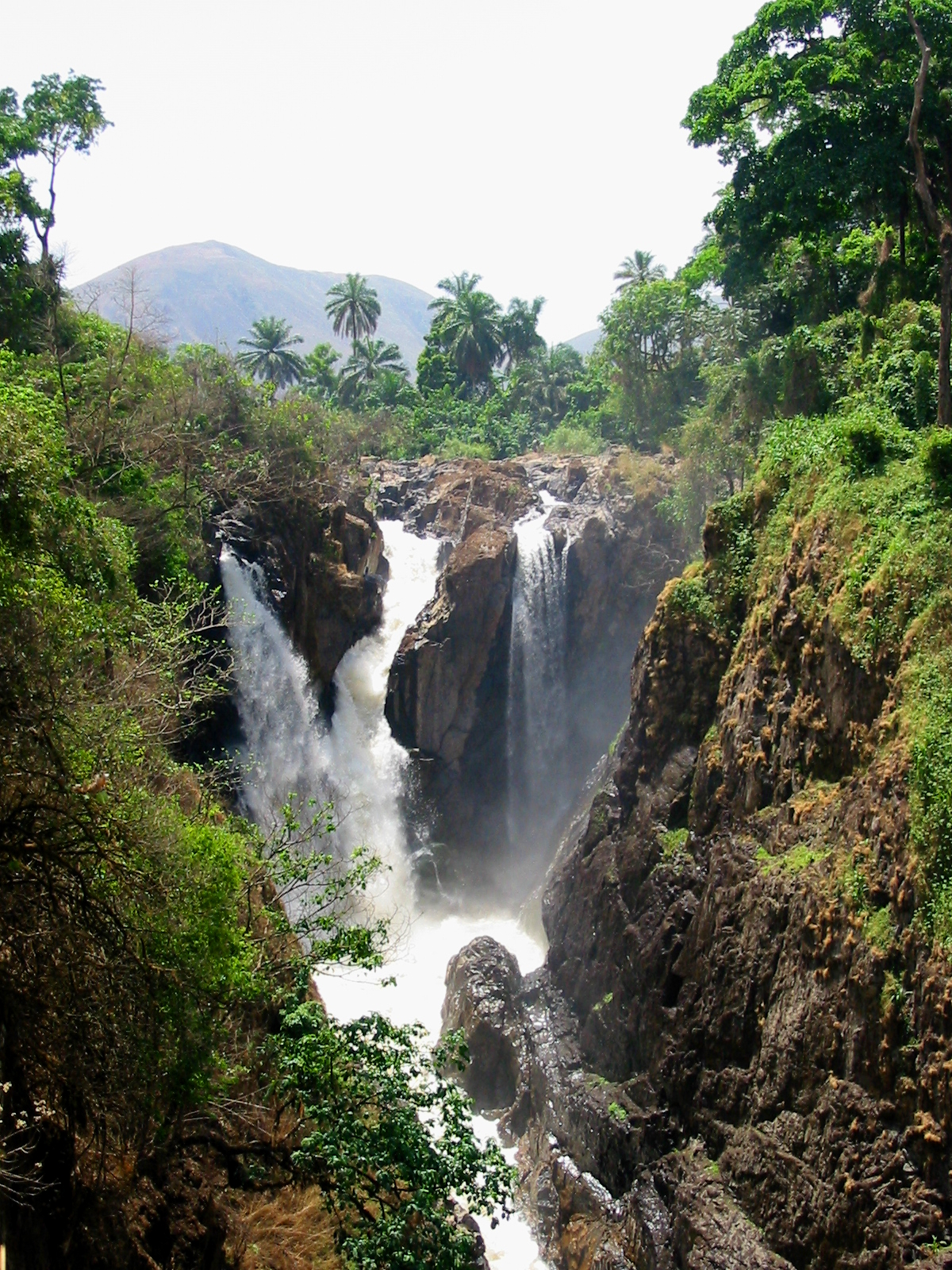
Menchum Falls

The Menchum River and its tributaries drains a large area of the Northwest Region of Cameroon. It in turn is a tributary of the Benue River in Nigeria.

== Location ==
The Menchum, Donga and Katsina Ala rivers all flow west from the Northeast Region to join the Benue in Nigeria. The Menchum drains the Oku-Kom highlands, which have an elevation of 2,400 metres (7,900 ft) around Lake Oku, falling to about 800 metres (2,600 ft) at Mbonkissu to the west of Fundong. The highlands, formed by volcanic action, have been dissected by steep valleys carved out by fast-flowing streams.

== Hydroelectric potential ==
The Menchum Falls, about 20 km south of Wum and 30 km north of Bafut, are impressive and a potential tourist attraction. However, the access road is very rough, and the viewing site is not well maintained. A 2003 guide stated that the road was virtually impassable in the rainy season. On 7 September 2009, Agreenergy and the Government of Cameroon signed a Memorandum of Understanding for a project to build a dam and 90MW hydroelectric power plant on the river. Apart from bringing electricity and jobs, the project would involve surfacing the road. On 8 December 2010 President Paul Biya announced plans to construct a dam on the Menchum Falls.

The Menchum Falls have political significance in the ongoing Anglophone Crisis. Ambazonian separatist movements plan on damming the Menchum Falls after independence to not only gain electricity self-sufficiency for their new country, but also to export to Cameroon and Nigeria.

== Environmental issues ==
The rich volcanic soils in the highlands have attracted farmers and grazers, and the resulting land clearances have made the area vulnerable to soil erosion. The Menchum Valley is low-lying, and used to be covered in equatorial forests. These have mostly been cleared for their timber, leaving open grassland that is used for grazing, and is subject to erosion on the slopes. Efforts are being made to reforest the valley.
