= The Bafut Beagles =

1954 book by Gerald Durrell

- First UK edition
- Author: Gerald Durrell
- Publisher: Rupert Hart-Davis
- Publication date: 1954

The Bafut Beagles by British naturalist Gerald Durrell tells the story of Durrell's 1949 expedition to the Cameroons collecting animals for zoos, made with Kenneth Smith. Published in 1954, it was Durrell's third book for popular audiences.

Particularly notable was his depiction of a native ruler, the Fon of Bafut, who proved so popular that Durrell visited him again in A Zoo in My Luggage. The book portray the Fon mostly in a humorous fashion, discussing his polygamy, anglophile perspective, and high tolerance for alcohol, but also in more flattering ways. The Fon awarded Durrell the ceremonial dress and staff during his second expedition. The Fon, although not named, was Achirimbi II.
