= A Zoo in My Luggage =

1960 book by Gerald Durrell

- First edition (publ. Rupert Hart-Davis)
- Author: Gerald Durrell, illustrated by Ralph Thompson
- Publication date: 1960

A Zoo in My Luggage is a book by British naturalist Gerald Durrell. It tells the story of Durrell's 1957 animal collecting trip to British Cameroon, the northwestern and southwestern corner of present-day Cameroon. It is one of a half-dozen books by Durrell recounting his animal collecting trips.

== Summary ==
The book relies Durrell's trip to the Cameroons during which spent six months collecting various animals, referred to as "beef" in Pidgin English. His expeditions include catching a python in a narrow cave, encountering a hippopotamus while traveling on the Cross River, and so on. It is his third book describing trips to the region, following The Overloaded Ark and The Bafut Beagles.
