= Bamenda =

City in Northwest Region, Cameroon

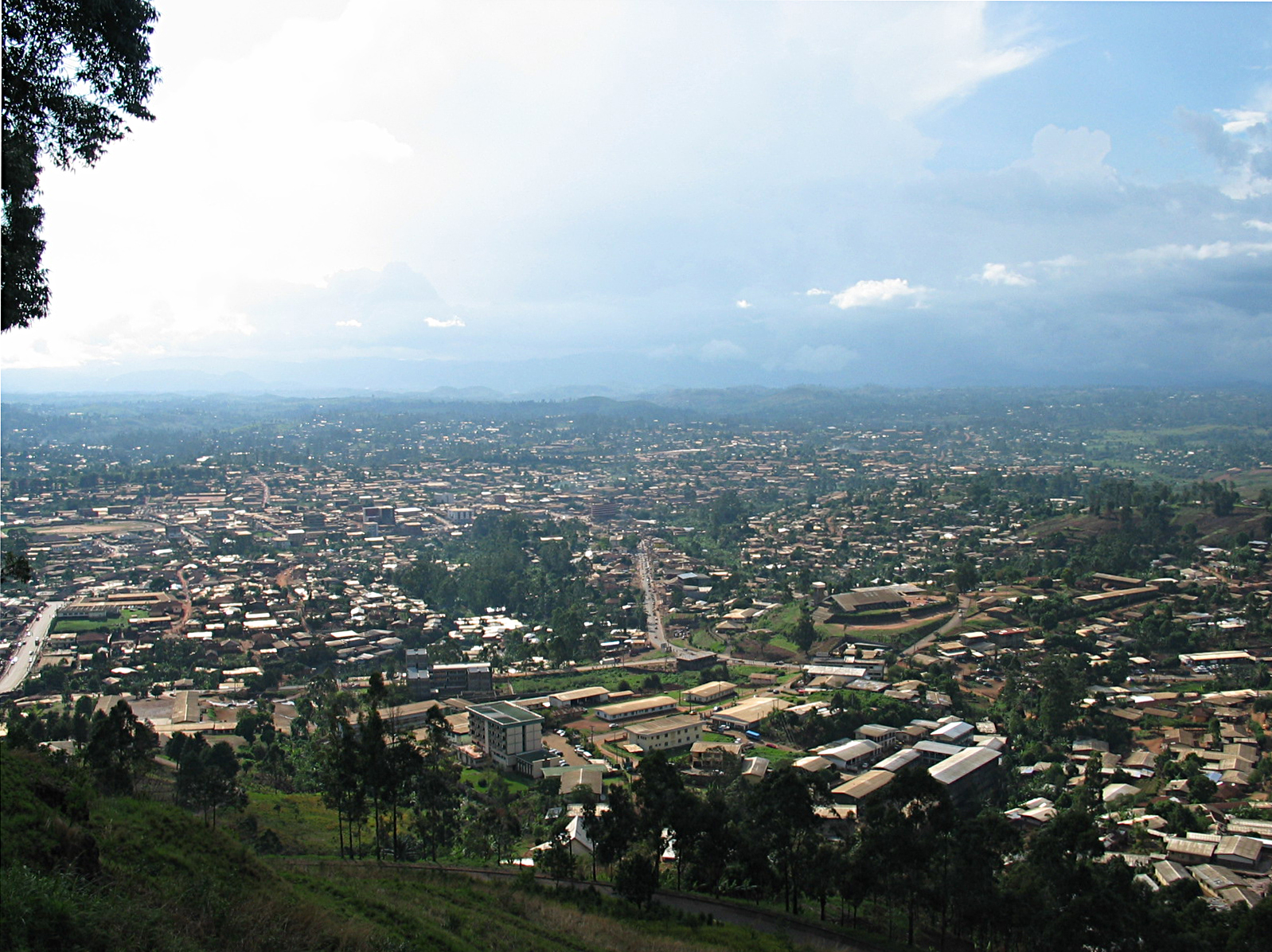
- Bamenda from the mountain road into town
- Nicknames: Abakwa (Note: This is the name given by the Hausa community, which migrated to this city in the nineteenth century. Usage of this term includes the local football club, and examples include the BBC in Pidgin.)
- Location within Cameroon
- Coordinates: 05°57′41″N 10°09′06″E
- Country: Cameroon
- Region: Northwest
- Department: Mezam

Government
  - Mayor: Achobang Tambeng Paul
- Elevation: 1,614 m (5,295 ft)

Population (2025)
  - City: 348,766
  - Urban: 636,000
- (Census)
- Time zone: UTC+1 (WAT)
- Website: Official website

Bamenda, also known as Abakwa and Mankon Town, is a city in northwestern Cameroon and capital of the Northwest Region. The city has a population of about six hundred thousand people and is located 366 km (227 mi) north-west of the Cameroonian capital, Yaoundé. Bamenda is known for its cool climate and scenic hilly location.

== History ==
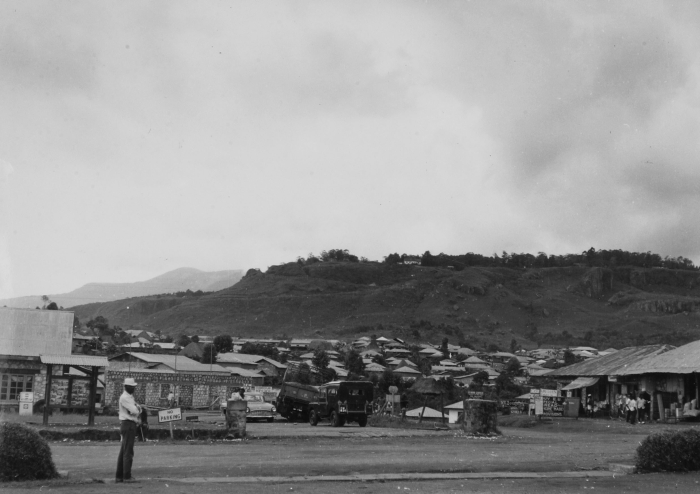
Bamenda, 1965

=== Colonial era ===
The origins of the city are related to the settlement of the Tikar people who culturally forged and maintained relations with the Kingdom of Bamum in the 1700s. In 1884, the city was colonized by Germany until 1916 when it became a colony administered by Great Britain and France. In 1919, the administration of Northwest Region and thus the city of Bamenda became only British. In 1961, the region joined the Cameroon.

=== Ambazonian aspirations ===
Many of the city's inhabitants are English-speaking, and Cameroonian Pidgin English is the main language spoken in the shops and on the streets of Bamenda. The Southern Cameroons Liberation Council is a united front consisting of multiple groups of separatists aiming for an independent Ambazonian state, which would include Bamenda. Protests started in 2016 in the city in reaction to the appointment of French-speaking judges in the area. Starting in 2017 as a continuation of the protests, the ongoing Anglophone crisis has heavily impacted the city, both through the actions of separatists and responses from the government. In September 2020, Cameroon launched Operation Bamenda Clean to expel separatist militias from the city. The operation has resulted in civilian deaths.

== Metropolitan area ==
The city is made up of 3 villages; Bamendakwe, Mankon and Nkwen classified as Bamenda I II and III sub-divisions respectively for administrative reasons. However, it is surrounded by other suburban areas and villages like Bambui, Akum, Bafut, Bali, Chombah and Mbatu. These suburban areas and villages are fast-growing and sometimes considered part of Bamenda.

== Economy ==
The main industries are the processing of agricultural produce such as coffee, elementary food processing, handicraft, cottage industry, education (schools), tourism/hospitality, construction works and transport. The local museum and shops display a wide variety of local baskets, beads, woodcarvings and bronze statues.

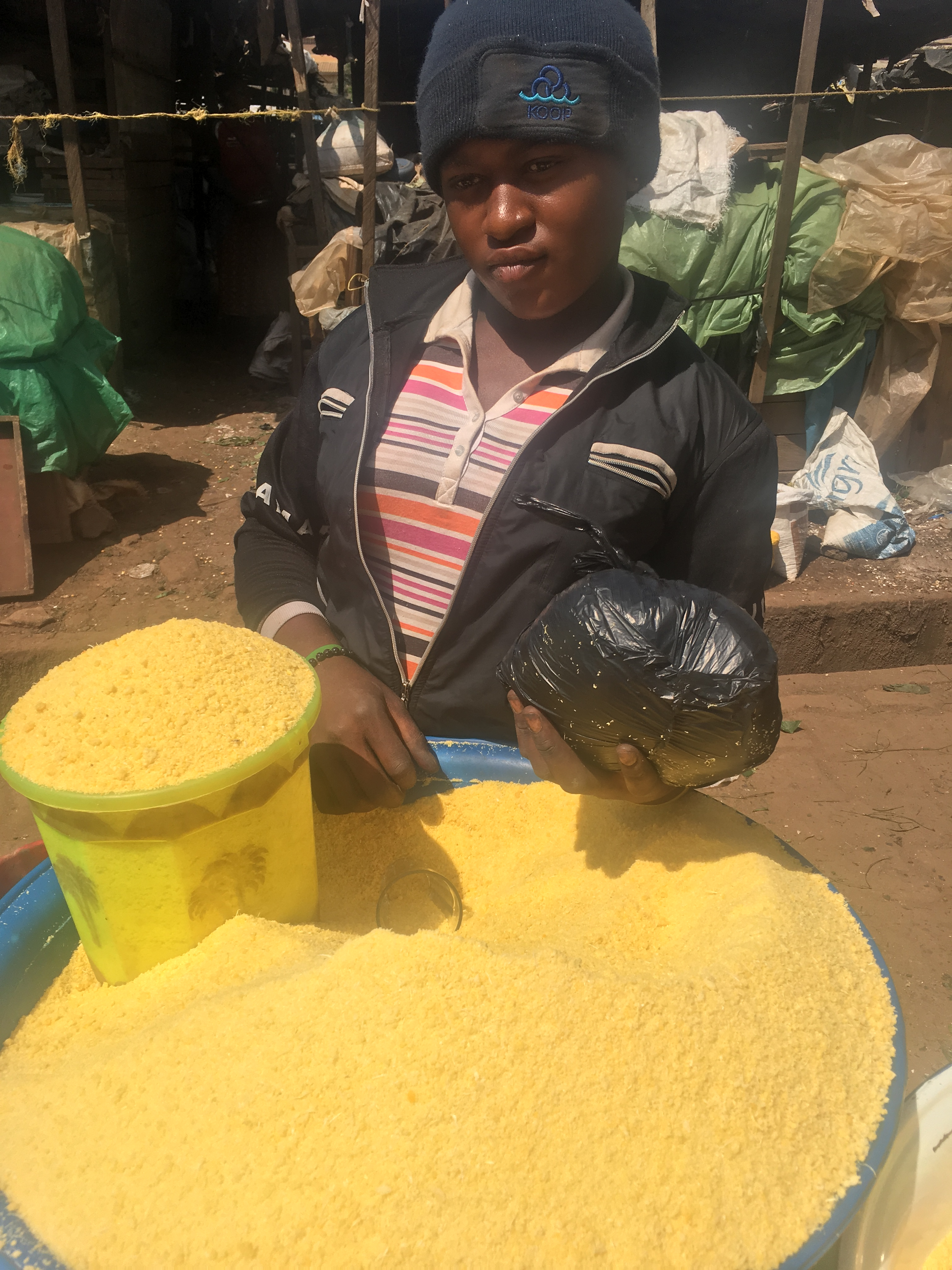
Garri (cassava flour) seller

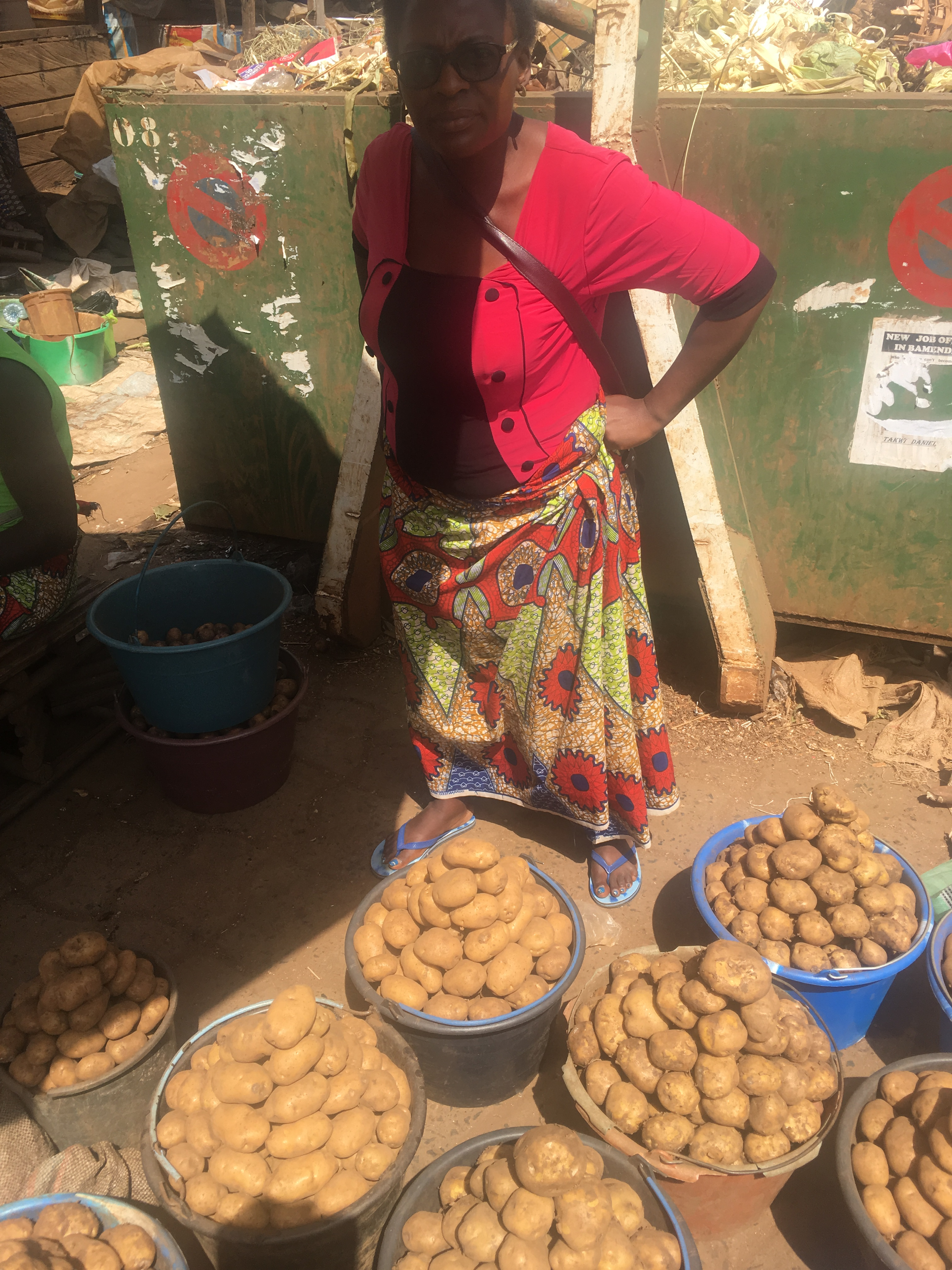
Potato seller

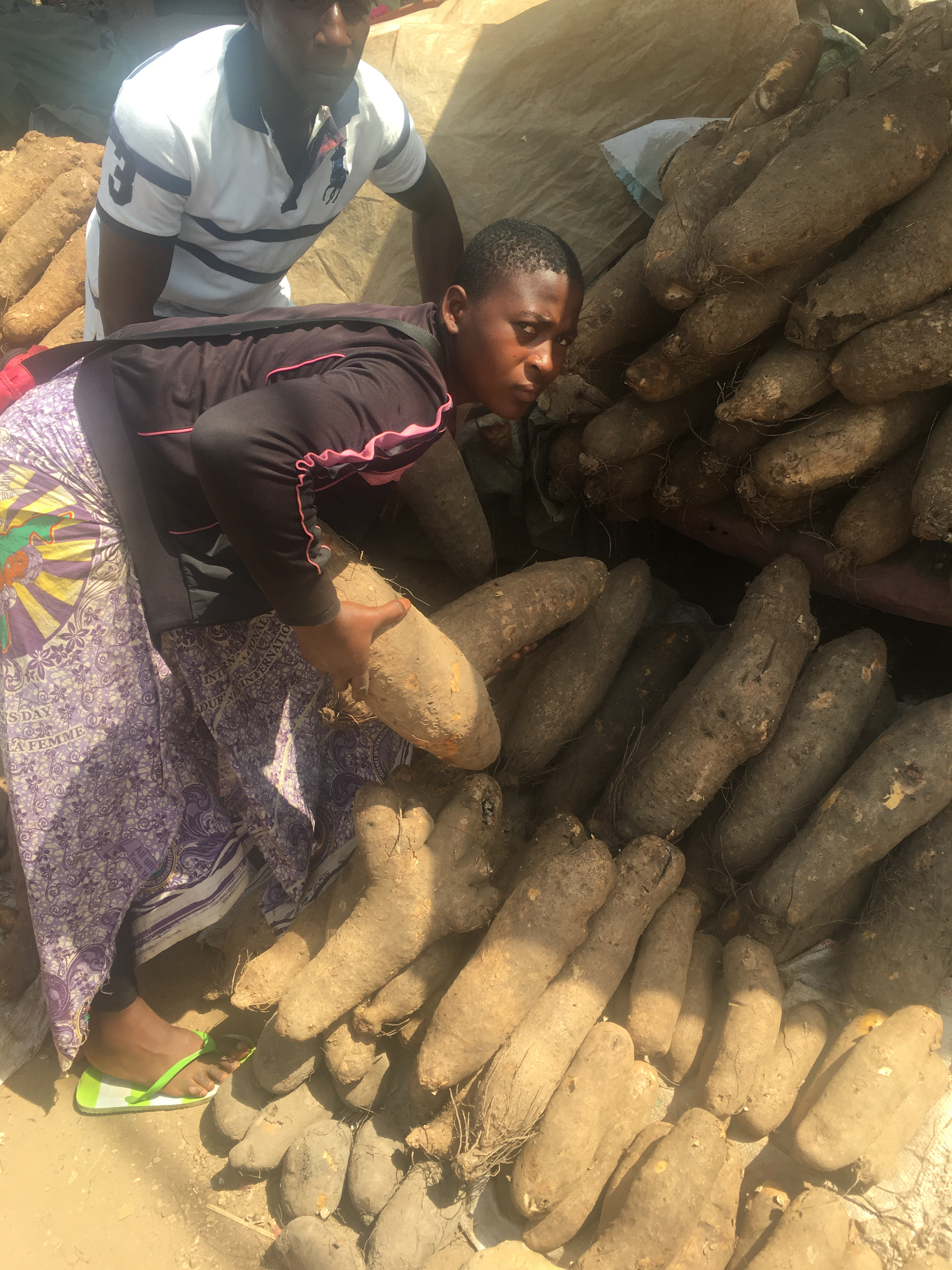
Yam seller

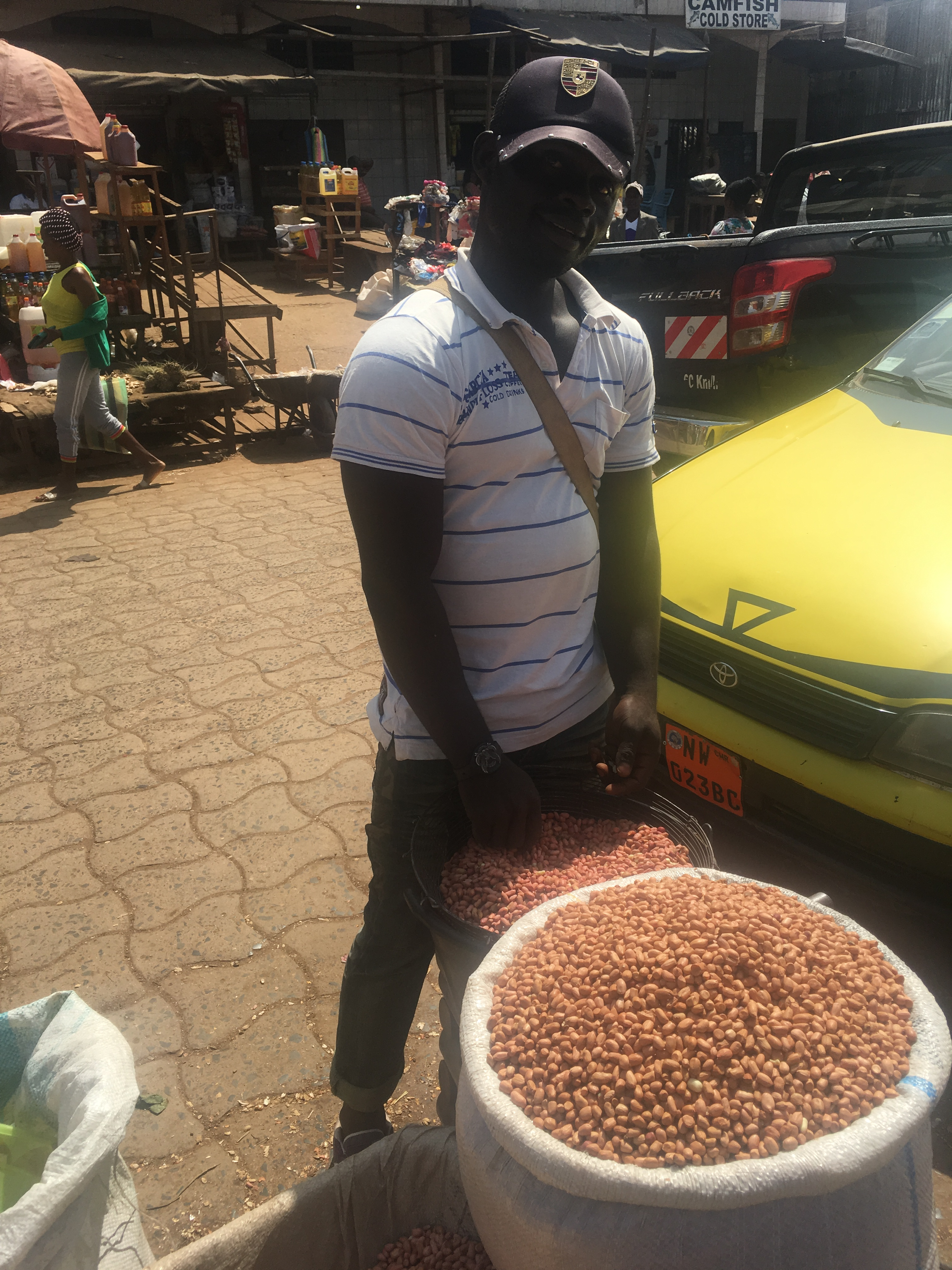
Peanut seller

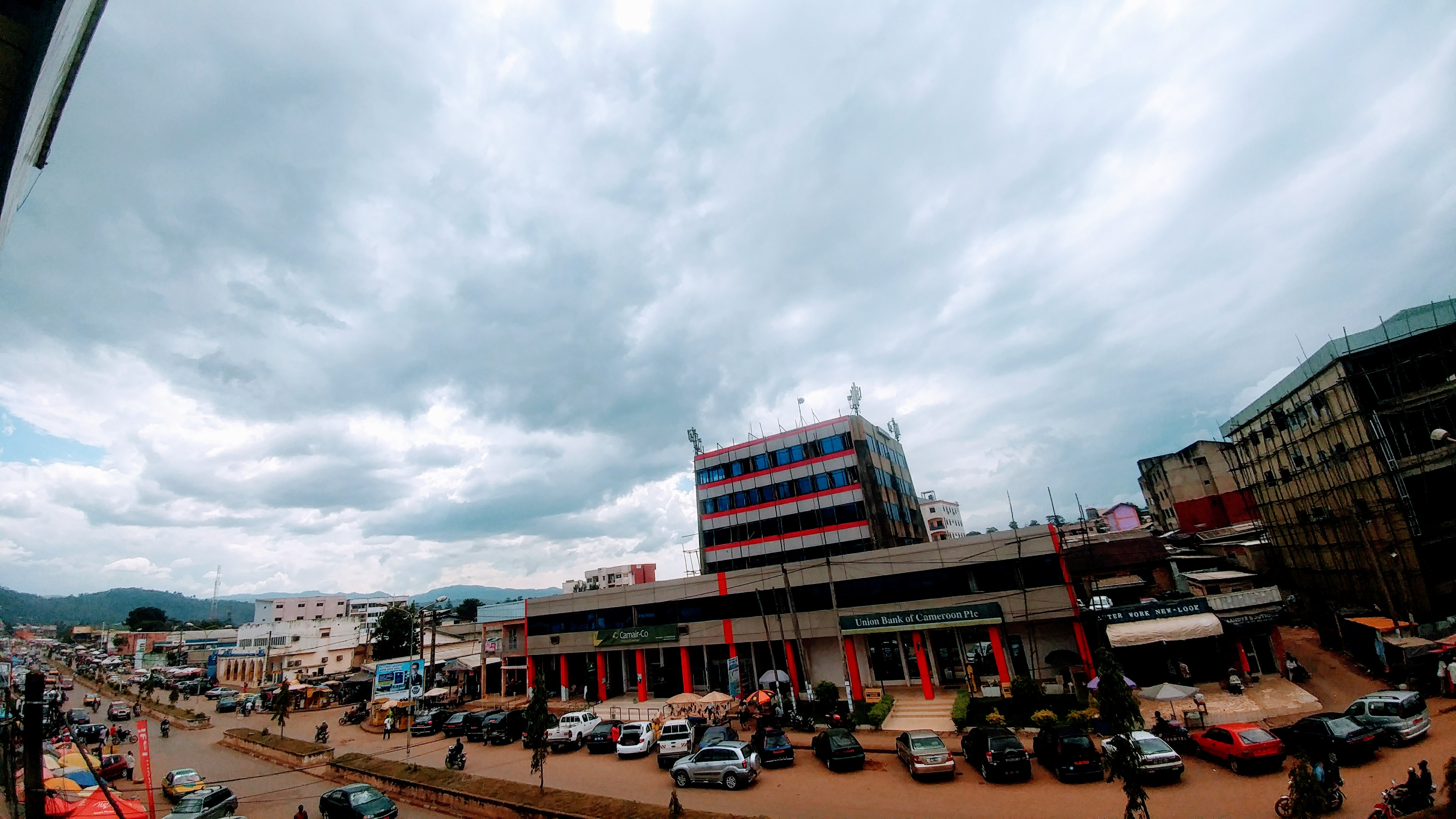
Commercial Avenue, Bamenda, Cameroun

In Bamenda, there are cultural sites such as the Mankon Fon's Palace with its newly constructed museum, and the Bali Fon's palace with its ancient architectural structures. The mountainous terrain around the city affords scenic views such as that from the mountain Sabga over the Ndop plain. Ndop plain stretches from under the Sabga mountain or hill Bamali, Bali Kumbat, Bamessing, Bamikumbit and many more sounding villages. One cannot oversee the Ngoketunjia mountain that dominates the Ndop central. Ngoketunjia means, a rock without heads.

== Transport ==
Bamenda is linked by road to Yaoundé and Douala, as well as an airport, Bamenda Airport, located in Bafut subdivision.

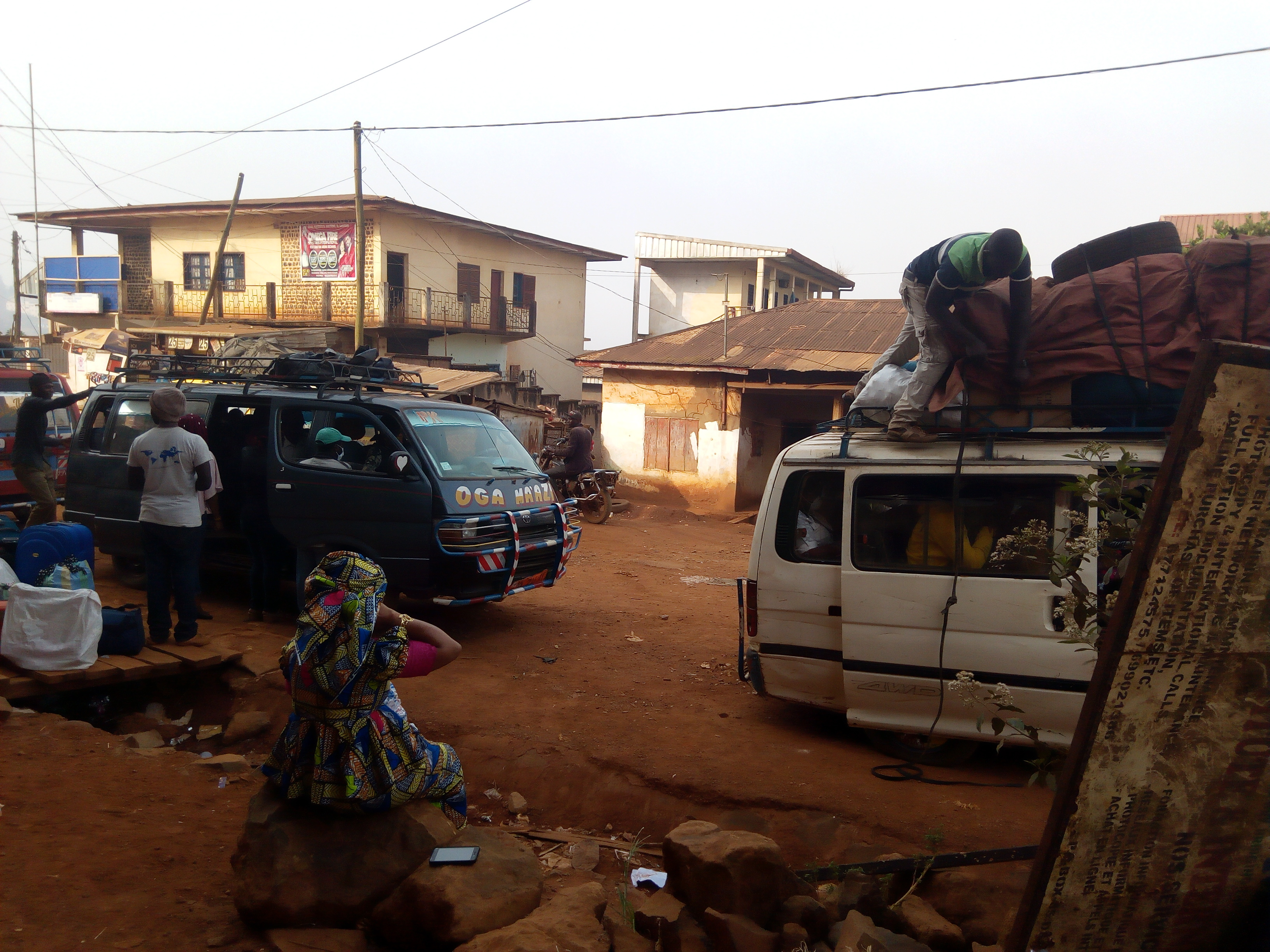
Loading vehicles

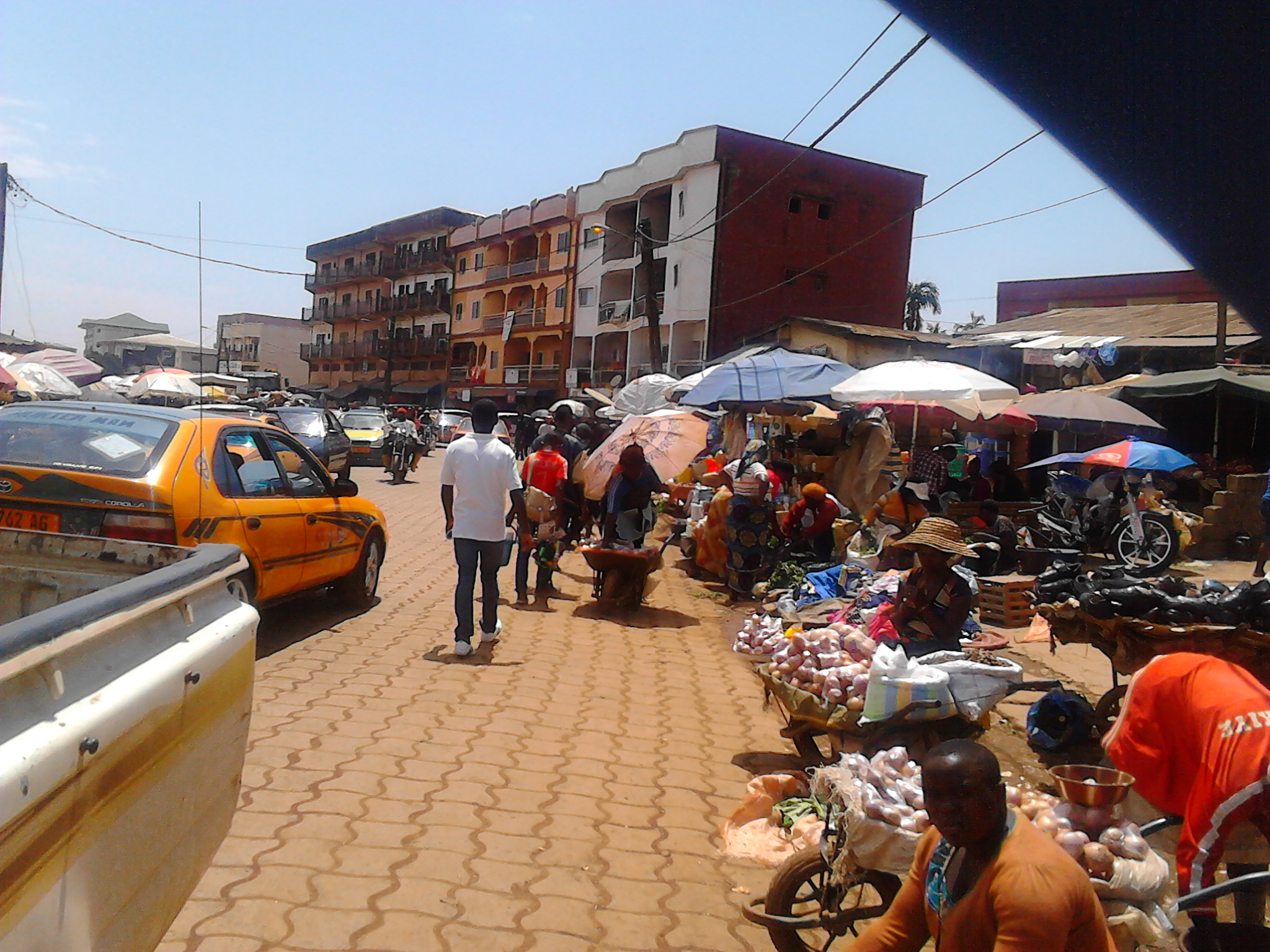
Urban transport

== Geography ==
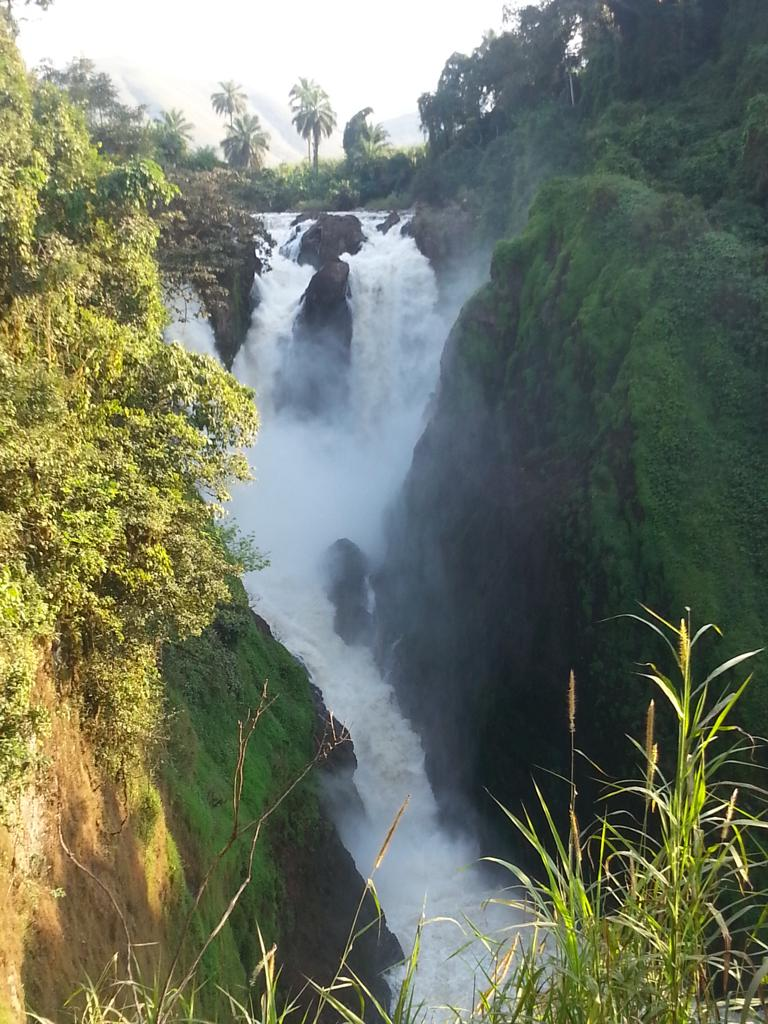
Menchum Fall located in Menchum Division, North West Region

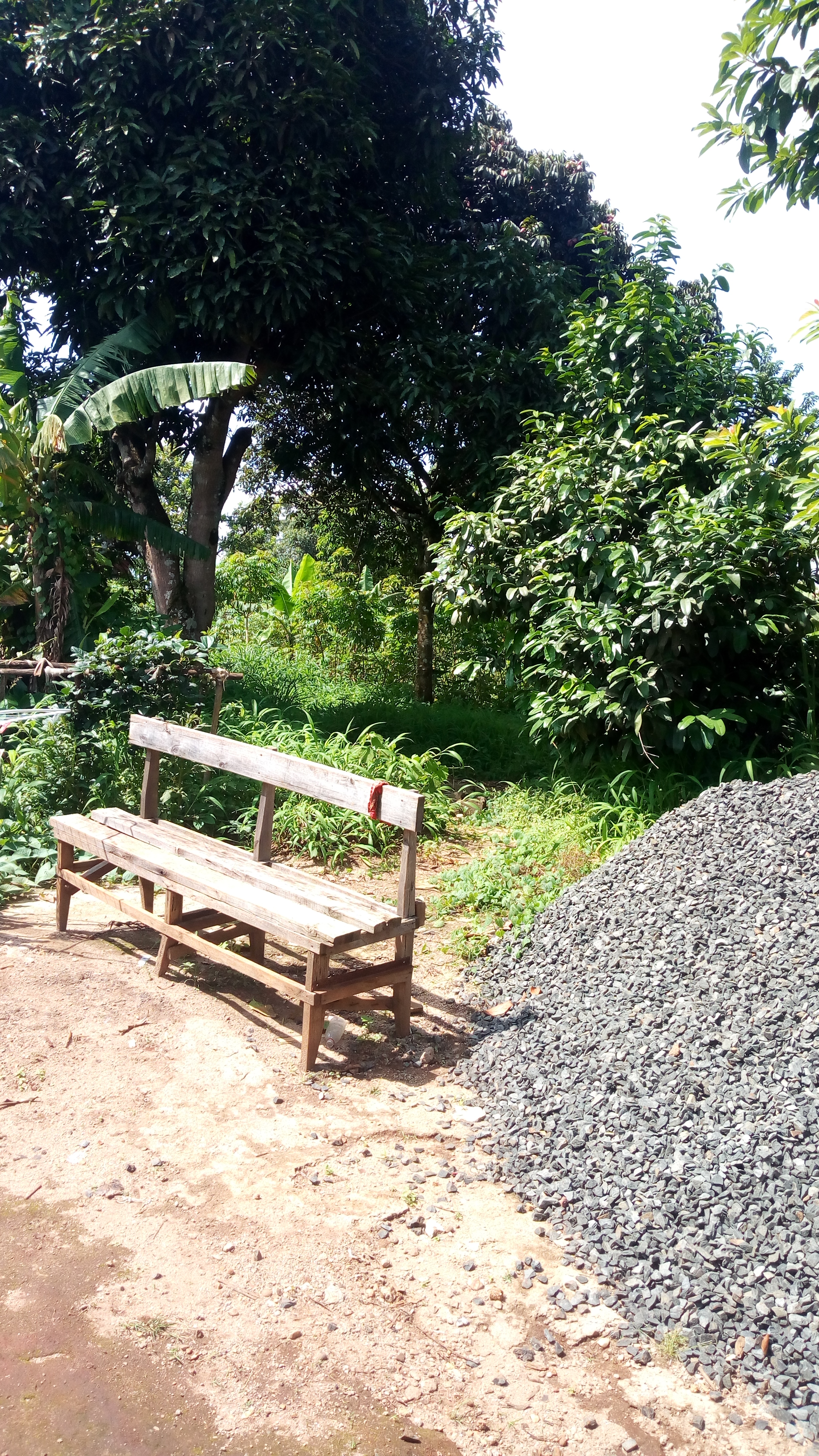
Same Joe's bushes, Bamenda

North of the city is the Bamenda Ring Road, a 367 km (228 mi) circular route through Cameroon Highlands. Along this road is Mount Oku 3,000 m (9,800 ft), the Kimbi River Game Reserve, the Menchum River waterfalls, a huge Fon's palace at Bafut, and a pyramidal thatched shrine at Akum (also known as Bagangu). Bamenda sits approximately 68 kilometres (42 mi) south of Ajuh-Mbuh.

== Climate ==
Bamenda has a tropical savanna climate (Köppen: Aw), very close to being classified as a tropical monsoon climate (Am), with a long summer wet season and considerably less rainfall in the winter.

Climate data for Bamenda
Month	Jan	Feb	Mar	Apr	May	Jun	Jul	Aug	Sep	Oct	Nov	Dec	Year
Mean daily maximum °C (°F)	25.9 (78.6)	26.8 (80.2)	26.3 (79.3)	25.6 (78.1)	24.8 (76.6)	23.9 (75.0)	22.1 (71.8)	22.1 (71.8)	23.9 (75.0)	23.4 (74.1)	24.2 (75.6)	25.5 (77.9)	24.5 (76.1)
Mean daily minimum °C (°F)	13.2 (55.8)	14.5 (58.1)	16.4 (61.5)	16.7 (62.1)	16.7 (62.1)	16.0 (60.8)	15.4 (59.7)	15.5 (59.9)	15.5 (59.9)	15.8 (60.4)	14.7 (58.5)	13.1 (55.6)	15.3 (59.5)
Average rainfall mm (inches)	11.6 (0.46)	29.4 (1.16)	118.9 (4.68)	178.1 (7.01)	175.3 (6.90)	266.7 (10.50)	410.0 (16.14)	411.9 (16.22)	389.7 (15.34)	227.8 (8.97)	31.6 (1.24)	9.1 (0.36)	2,260.1 (88.98)
Average rainy days (≥ 0.1 mm)	2	3	12	19	21	24	27	27	27	23	6	1	192
Source: World Meteorological Organization

According to the World Health Organization, Bamenda is the most polluted city in Africa in terms of PM2.5 particulate matter.

== Education ==
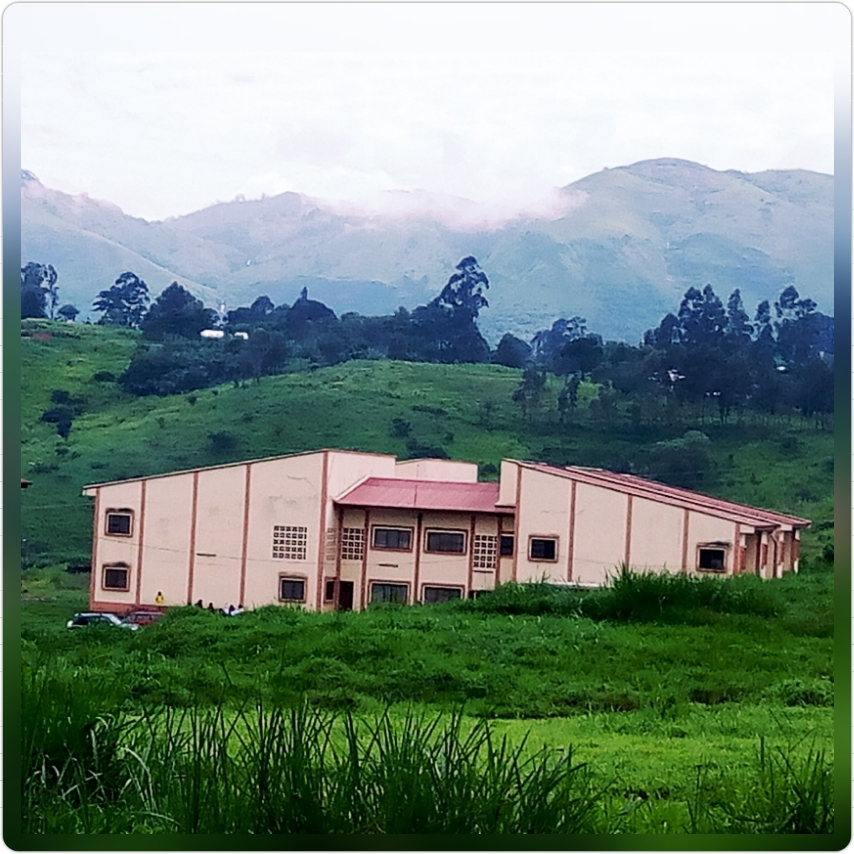
Bambili, University of Bamenda

The city of Bamenda has many primary and secondary schools which offers both general technical and vocational training. It has a state-owned university, the University of Bamenda, which trains students in all three cycles of education that is, Bachelor's, Master's & Doctorate (BMD) in different fields. Several University Institutes and professional institutions of learning also exist in the city of Bamenda. These institutions are mostly privately owned or owned by religious denominations.

The Bamenda University of Science and Technology (BUST) is a brain child of The Industrial and Educational Development Company Ltd (INDECO). It was incorporated on 12 October 1995.

INDECO and the university (BUST) were founded by the Late Rt. Hon. John Ngu Foncha, with the encouragement of the Cameroon Government. The university went operational in January 1998. At the request of government, BUST participated and contributed extensively to the drafting of the Law on Private Higher Education in Cameroon.

BUST is a 4-year Arts, Science and Technology University. Degrees offered include B.A., BEd, BSc, HND., SRN., AN., Lab. Tech., and Assist. Lab. Tech. Formalities for Post Graduate Studies have been put in place, to go operational by the academic year 2010/2011.

Its main national affiliate is the University of Buéa, though other partnership arrangements are under way with the University of Dschang. The Bamenda University of Science and Technology is affiliated to the University of Osnabrück (Germany) and the University of Wales at Bangor. It trains college teachers, medical doctors etc. and graduates in Accountancy, management, marketing, and a number of other fields of study.

Another institution of higher learning is National Polytechnic Bamenda, formerly National Polytechnic Bambui.

== Places of worship ==
Among the places of worship, they are predominantly Christian churches and temples: Roman Catholic Archdiocese of Bamenda (Catholic Church), Evangelical Church of Cameroon (World Communion of Reformed Churches), Presbyterian Church in Cameroon (World Communion of Reformed Churches), Cameroon Baptist Convention (Baptist World Alliance), Full Gospel Mission Cameroon (Assemblies of God), and Church of God Ministry of Jesus Christ International. There are also Muslim mosques.

== Sports ==
Over the years, Bamenda has had two football teams that played in the First Division Championship. In the 1970s, it was PWD Bamenda and later in the 1980s, it was Camark Bamenda. With the fall in the influence and budgeting of public works department and National Produce Marketing Board (NPMB), both teams fell from the limelight. Presently Camark Bamenda is out of existence, while PWD Bamenda are back in the top division after a slump to the third tier for almost 20 years. They won their first Elite One title in the 2019-20 season. The other club from Bamenda in the professional league at the moment is Yong Sports Academy. They won the Cameroonian Cup in 2013.

== Politics ==
Bamenda is the founding place and the seat of the largest opposition political party in Cameroon, the Social Democratic Front (SDF), and the home of its leader, John Fru Ndi. There is a large military presence throughout the city. On 26 May 1990, a group of Bamenda elites launched the party in Ntarikon Bamenda despite a heavy police presence. However, the launching had casualties since six civilians were killed.

Bamenda is also the birthplace of the Southern Cameroons National Council (SCNC), a group that wants the restoration of the former Southern Cameroons, a territory that covers the English-speaking provinces of North West and South West. The SCNC was born in Bamenda in 1994, after the All Anglophone Conference (AAC2) issued the Bamenda Declaration in which it had asked the government of President Paul Biya to respond to all anglophone grievances stated in the Buea Declaration of 1993 or face the wrath of the people of the Southern Cameroons. The Cameroon government failed to respond to the Bamenda Declaration, and since then, the SCNC has categorically maintained that it now considers the restoration of the independence of the Southern Cameroons to be final and irrevocable.

== Notable people ==
- The artist Libianca refers to herself as being "from Bamenda" in her song titled People.
- Andy Allo, singer-songwriter and Actress was born in Bamenda
- Afowiri Fondzenyuy, philanthropist, social entrepreneur, charity fundraiser, and long-distance marathon enthusiast was born in Bamenda
- Missy BK, musical artist born in Bamenda
