= 1991 Lesotho coup d'état =

Military overthrow of Justin Lekhanya

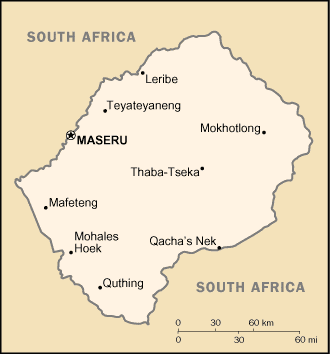
- A CIA WFB map of Lesotho
- Date: 30 April 1991
- Location: (Lesotho) Maseru
- Type: Military coup
- Motive: Regime change
- Organised by: Elias Phisoana Ramaema
- Participants: Lesotho Defence Force (faction)
- Outcome: Coup succeeds: Overthrow of military government of Prime Minister Lekhanya.; Colonel Ramaema assumed the leadership of the Military Council.; Multi-party general election held in 1993.; King Moshoeshoe II restored to the throne in 1995.

The 1991 Lesotho coup d'état was a military coup that took place in Lesotho on 30 April 1991, led by Colonel Elias Phisoana Ramaema. It led to the resignation of Prime Minister General Justin Lekhanya, who held the office since the 1986 coup d'état.

Colonel Ramaena besieged the government and forced Prime Minister Lekhanya to resign. During Ramaena's two years in power, a new constitution restoring the powers of the Parliament was adopted. Multi-party general election was held on 27 March 1993, with the assistance of the Secretariat of the Commonwealth of Nations, at the request of the government. Finally, the exiled King Moshoeshoe II, who was dethroned by General Lekhanya in 1990, was restored to the throne on 25 January 1995.
