= History of the Pan Africanist Congress of Azania =

Aspect of South African political history

This article covers the history of the Pan Africanist Congress of Azania, once a South African liberation movement and now a minor political party.

== History ==
=== Origins ===
For many years, there had been increasing strain on the African National Congress (ANC), caused by tension between those with more temperate views and those with Africanist views. A large cause of these differences was the multi-racial personality of the establishment: the Africanists did not think that collaborating with Indians, Coloureds and whites would help the indigenous inhabitants (i.e., black people) acquire political command of South Africa. The pressure became more distinct when the ANC recognised the Freedom Charter, which the Africanists thought too conservative. They felt that it did not give enough attention to black power. A statement in the Charter's preamble refers to "we, the people of South Africa, black and white together equals, countrymen and brothers", and the Africanists were displeased with this notion.

In November 1958, at the Transvaal provincial assembly, some Africanists were barred. They chose to leave the ANC and, in March 1959, founded the PAC. Robert Mangaliso Sobukwe was voted for as the inaugural chairman and Potlako Leballo as secretary. The PAC opted to follow the Programme of Action and Defiance Campaign. Sobukwe declared that South Africa would be under black rule by 1963.

=== Early history ===
There was much rivalry between the ANC and the PAC as they fought for backers. The ANC had long been speaking about orchestrating an anti-pass drive, however failed to ever do so. The PAC thus decided to take it upon themselves, and the anti-pass operation turned out to be a very important one for the PAC, and for South African political affairs generally. The date for the PAC's campaign was finally set for March 21, 1960 and the weekend was spent handing out brochures and activating people. Sobukwe urged people to leave their passes at home and, non-violently, to hand themselves over for arrest at the nearest police station.

People did as expected during the PAC's anti-passbook crusade, handing themselves over at police stations and commanding the officials to apprehend them for not having passes. They wished to lay bare the fact that the country could do little to compel people to conform to the system. As it was impossible to seize and lock away thousands of people, the law-makers would be forced to scrap the legislation.

Passbooks had their origins in the Nineteenth Century as an implement for controlling mine workers. During apartheid, the state used it to regulate the movement of people and impose apartheid legislation. Black people had to bear their passes when they came into "white" areas. The books became representational of the racial discrimination and tyranny of the government and were hated acutely. Anti-pass campaigns date back to the Nineteenth Century.

On 21 March 1960, a great throng assembled at the Sharpeville police station, near Vereeniging. Drum Magazine describes the host as including women and children, and loud but not violent. The protest erupted in tragedy when nervy police opened fire on a group of protestors in Sharpeville, killing 69 people and injuring 186, many being shot from behind. The police had not been given the order to open fire.

In Langa, in the Cape, violence also exploded. About 6,000 people assembled, awaiting orders from their leaders. The protest march on the police station began in the morning but was soon called off by one of its leaders, Philip Kgosana, after the police made a threat of violence. News of the Sharpeville Massacre incensed the protestors, however, and they marched anyway, the police shooting and killing two of them. Turbulence persisted into the night, with demonstrators rioting and setting fire to public buildings.

There was a sense of victory following these events. The pass laws were repealed and police cruelty had brought forth international censure. The PAC and ANC held a day of mourning. This triumph was soon eclipsed, however, by the measures taken by the National Party government to rout all resistance. Public gatherings were forbidden from 24 March, and mass detention followed a week later. Additional protest rallies were held in Durban and Cape Town. The government responded by declaring a state of emergency. On March 30, both the PAC and the ANC were outlawed, and, by mid-May, almost 2,000 people had been arrested, including PAC leader Robert Sobukwe and his associates. Sobukwe was imprisoned at Robben Island for many years and was thought to be so "dangerous" and charismatic by the apartheid government that he was kept not only in solitary confinement, but in a one-man jail. He was released in 1969.

=== Internal conflict ===
After Sharpeville, many members fled into exile. When Sobukwe died in 1978, he was succeeded by Potlako Leballo. The PAC then split into two following a partially successful coup by David Sibeko to head the Presidential Leadership Council in 1979. The assassination of Sibeko in Dar es Salaam, Tanzania on 12 June 1979 and the death of Leballo in January 1986 inaugurated the demise of the PAC.

Although founded by ANC members who were in profound opposition to the policies of the South African Communist Party, in the 1960s a prominent section of the PAC's leadership adopted a Maoist position. The ANC consistently regarded the PAC as reactionary and backward due to the PAC's stance that South Africa was above all an African country. The military wing of the PAC was launched in 1962 as Poqo and later renamed as the Azanian People's Liberation Army (APLA). APLA became famous for its wildly popular slogan "One Settler, One Bullet", but was never able to launch a particularly effective guerrilla campaign. Despite its organisational weaknesses, the PAC's Africanism did much to inform the student uprisings of the late 1970s and inspired the formation of the Black Consciousness Movement under the leadership of Steve Biko.

=== After apartheid ===
Despite its accomplishments in the resistance to apartheid, the PAC has a diminished influence in the post-apartheid era. The PAC was unbanned in 1990, along with the ANC, but was plagued by infighting. The supporters of Maoist Leballo refused to join the peace process and a splinter section of the PAC only gained a small percentage of votes in the 1994 election, which shrank even further in the 1999 election. In 2003, after yet another failed congress, one of the party's more prominent and popular members, Patricia de Lille left to form her own party, the Independent Democrats. This did not affect the PAC's continued poor performance in the 2004 election, although ID fared better.

It now only has one member in Parliament after the deputy parliamentary leader, Themba Godi, left to form his own party, the African Peoples' Convention, in 2007.

In February 2022, the PAC and the Azanian People's Organisation (AZAPO) announced a new unity pact with the intention to contest elections together.

In 2024, leader of the party, Mzwanele Nyhontso, was again the sole PAC elected MP. He joined the Government of National Unity as Minister of Land Reform and Rural Development after the ruling ANC lost its outright majority in parliament.
