= Vusumzi Make =

South African civil rights activist and lawyer (1934 – 2006)

Vusumzi Linda Make (8 September 1934 – 15 April 2006) was a South African lawyer, academic, and anti-apartheid activist. After going into exile in 1958, he became a leading figure in the Pan Africanist Congress (PAC), representing the organization abroad and serving as its chairman during the late 1970s. Make also worked in academia, lecturing at the University of Liberia, and is remembered for his relationship with the writer Maya Angelou.

== Early life ==
Vusumzi Make was born in 1934 in Boksburg, Transvaal, where his father worked as a preacher. The family then moved to Evaton, and Make studied law through a correspondence course organised by the University of South Africa.

== Anti-apartheid activism ==
Make joined the African National Congress (ANC) as a teenager. In 1955, he helped to organise bus boycotts across Transvaal to protest fare increases. He was arrested twice over the course of the campaign, becoming the youngest defendant in the 1956 Treason Trial, but was found not guilty.

In January 1958, Make was summoned by the South African Native Commission and exiled to Sibasa. Seeking to continue his activism abroad, he fled South Africa by crossing the land border into Southern Rhodesia and travelling from there to independent Ethiopia. Make joined the PAC shortly after its formation in 1959. He would later represent the party within the short-lived South African United Front, working closely with the ANC's Oliver Tambo.

In 1960, while in New York City to petition the United Nations, he met the American writer Maya Angelou and they began a relationship. Make and Angelou moved to Cairo together, where Make led a PAC delegation intended to secure funds and publicity for the anti-apartheid movement. After the two separated, Make moved to the United Kingdom and then Zambia to continue his political work.

When PAC Chairman Potlako Leballo was forced out of the position in May 1979, Make was appointed to a new Presidential Council alongside David Sibeko and Ellias Ntloedibe. One month later, Make and Sibeko were attacked by members of the Azanian People's Liberation Army, the PAC armed wing, in a factional dispute. Sibeko was killed, and Make briefly became party chairman before resigning to make way for John Nyathi Pokela. Under Pokela, Make served as deputy chair of the PAC.

== Death ==
Make died on 15 April 2006 in the HF Verwoerd hospital in Pretoria at the age of 75. He was survived by his widow Alma Liziwe Make and daughter Titise.

Preceded by David Sibeko, Ellias Ntloedibe, and Make	Chairman of the Pan Africanist Congress; August 1979–January 1981	Succeeded by John Nyathi Pokela
