= Maaparankoe Mahao =

Mosotho lieutenant general

Maaparankoe Mahao (27 January 1968 in Thaba-Tseka – 25 June 2015 near Mokema, Maseru District) was a Mosotho lieutenant general. His appointment as commander of the Lesotho Defence Force (LDF) in 2014 and the resultant refusal of his predecessor, Kennedy Tlali Kamoli to evacuate the post, ignited a season of political instability in Lesotho. After Kamoli's return to the post, Mahao was murdered by soldiers under suspicious circumstances.

== Life ==
Mahao was born the sixth of seven children. His father was a public servant and a socialist. Maaparankoe Mahao attended Mokema Primary School from 1976 and St. Joseph's High School in Maseru from 1982. He joined the Lesotho Patriotic Youth Organisation (LPYO), which opposed the ruling military government under General Justin Metsing Lekhanya. At the National University of Lesotho he earned a Bachelor of Law in 1992 and an LL.B. in 1994. He was President of the Committee for Action and Solidarity for South African Students (CASSAS) as well as President of the Students' Representative Council (SRC). He co-founded the Lesotho Youth Federation and in 1990/1991 was one of the founding members of the Popular Front for Democracy (PFD), of which he was a member until his death in 2014.

=== Joining the LDF ===
Mahao joined the Lesotho Defence Force in 1996 as a lawyer. His task was to professionalise the armed forces and in 1998 he was promoted to the rank of captain. That same year, he married 'Mamphanya Mahao, with whom he had three sons. From 2002 to 2007 he served as the Commander of the Special Forces and distinguished himself during the evacuation of the National Assembly after attacks. He was promoted to brigadier general and received the post of military attache in the Basotho embassy in Addis Ababa, Ethiopia. In 2012 he earned a Master of Peace Studies and Security in Africa from the University of Addis Ababa.

In 2008 he was made chief of staff of the Southern African Development Community Planning Department at the SADC headquarters in Gaborone, Botswana.

On 15 January 2014, Mahao was charged with indiscipline and "behaving in an unbecoming character of an officer, contrary to Section 75 of the Lesotho Defence Force Act 4, 1996" after reprimanding Commando Captain Tefo Hashatsi two days previously. Hashatsi had reportedly been inciting soldiers to rebel should a new commander be appointed, contrary to the law. Surprisingly, the event resulted in Mahao's suspension.

=== Events since 29 August 2014 ===
On 29 August 2014, Mahao was promoted to lieutenant-general and appointed by Prime Minister Tom Thabane with the approval of King Letsie III to replace Tlali Kamoli as commander of the LDF. Kamoli had been dismissed for insubordination and refusing to hand over soldiers under his command accused of murder, attempted murder and robbery to the police. He refused to accept his demotion and remained in the post. Soldiers loyal to Kamoli carried out a series of attacks on police stations and high-ranking politicians' homes. Mahao's house was also peppered with bullets and his dog shot and killed, but he and the targeted politicians fled to South Africa, in what was widely deemed a coup- attempt by Kamoli. Pro- Kamoli soldiers claimed that Mahao could not legally be promoted to lieutenant-general, much less LDF commander, because he was still under suspension. The independent SADC commission of inquiry established under Botswana's Justice Mpaphi Phumaphi, would later deem Mahao's appointment by the Prime Minister as legal as the suspension had been quashed.

Even after his return, Mahao was prevented from entering the barracks due to the tense situation, thereby preventing him from formally taking office. Sections of the army remained under Kamoli's control. SADC was called in to negotiate between the two sides, resulting in the snap election of February 2015. Kamoli, Mahao and the chief of police, Khothatso Tsooana, were ordered to leave the country in order to preserve the peace. Mahao was sent to South Sudan, Tsooana to Algeria and Kamoli to South Africa, after various countries refused to accommodate Kamoli for his role in the attempted coup. The talks were led by Vice-President Cyril Ramaphosa of South Africa.

The election resulted in a narrow win by the opposition and a 7-party coalition government was formed, led by Bethuel Pakalitha Mosisili's Democratic Congress (DC). In April 2015, Mahao received a letter declaring his appointment as LDF commander as well as his promotion to lieutenant-general null and void. Tlali Kamoli was restored to post. Mahao went to court to fight his demotion.

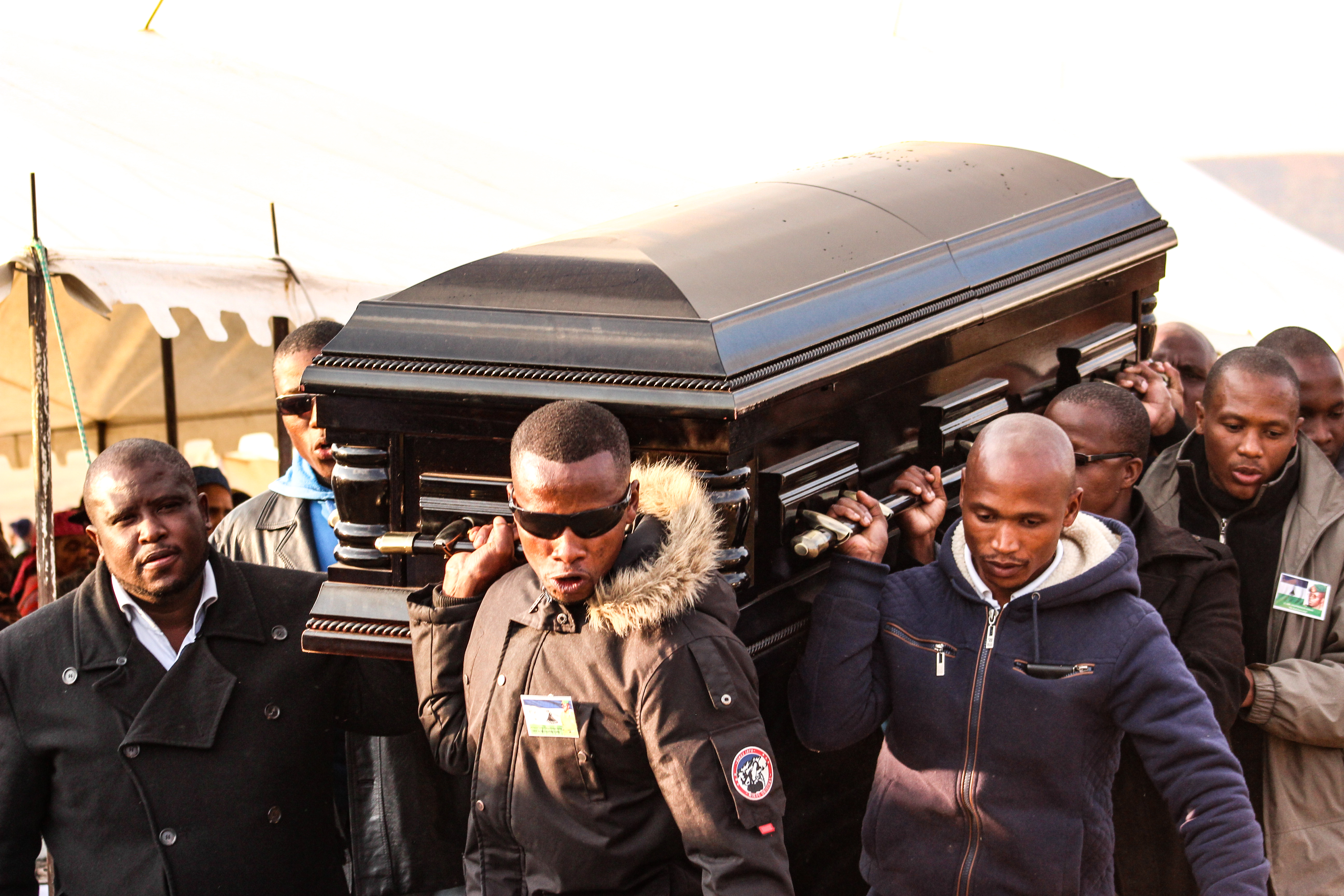
The funeral of Lt. Gen. Maaparankoe Mahao on 11 July 2015 at Mokema, Maseru.

== Murder of Mahao ==
On 25 June 2015, Mahao left his farm in Mokema with two nephews. According to the nephew's testimony and a letter written by Mahao's family to UN Secretary-General Ban Ki-moon and other African leaders, his car was chased and stopped by three military vehicles. A group of men, including one dressed as a soldier, carrying AK-47 rifles shot at Mahao from the driver's side of his truck. The boys opened the passenger door but were suddenly stopped by soldiers. In the meantime, Lt. Gen. Mahao fell out of his truck through the open passenger door left open by his nephews. Soldiers then came around and dragged his bleeding body by his feet, face-down on tarred road and threw it into one of their trucks. Two vehicles drove off, while the third one stayed behind with the nephews. The two boys were held by soldiers who remained behind for approximately 40 minutes before they were released. One of the soldiers asked one of Mahao's nephews who they were and what they were doing with him. The nephew told the soldier that he was a student in a university in South Africa, and had come home for winter holidays. The soldier replied, "U tlo lija ha bohloko he?!", meaning the nephew was not going to enjoy the holidays. In the meantime, the soldier had made a call with his mobile phone, apparently reporting to his sender that "Re mo thuntse!", meaning they (soldiers) had shot Lt. Gen. Mahao. The soldier also mentioned on the phone that they were with a particular Sergeant. The soldiers then gave the boys an option to either return to Lt. Gen. Mahao's home and narrate what they had witnessed to Lt. Gen. Mahao's mother, or go to Maseru to report to his wife. The boys opted to go to Maseru. Driving the bloody truck with broken windows, the remaining army truck drove the opposite direction, only to catch up with the boys shortly after, finding them on the roadside standing outside the truck, fearing a possibility of explosives in the truck. Soldiers rebuked them and ordered them to keep going, which they did while the army truck followed them until passing and leaving them on the road. The exact time of Mahao's death is unclear.

UN Secretary-General Ban Ki-moon issued a statement to condemn the murder of Mahao the following day, on 26 June 2015, and demanded a full investigation. The SADC set up a special commission of inquiry, led by High Court Judge of Botswana Mpathi Phumathi. Two SADC doctors and a third appointed by the Mahao family performed an autopsy and declared that Mahao had been shot eleven times in the head, chest and arms with automatic weapons.

The Ministry of Defence claimed that Mahao had been killed in a special operation to round-up suspected military mutineers "following a confrontation" with the soldiers. Mahao's family criticised the government for "deliberately distorting information" surrounding the attack. Mahao's brother, vice-chancellor of the National University of Lesotho (NUL) and former Dean at Witwatersrand University in South Africa, stated in a public address that "We expected government to condemn General Mahao's murder and order the immediate arrest of perpetrators of this foul act. It has done neither, and seems to treat the grieving family and the nation with disdain."

Thousands of Basotho, including Queen Masenate, Chief Mathealira Seeiso (uncle of King Letsie III) and many employees of the National University of Lesotho, attended Mahao's funeral on 11 July in Mokema. Local radio station Harvest FM was prevented from broadcasting the ceremony live to listeners, allegedly by the government.

=== Phumaphi Commission ===
The final report of the Phumaphi Commission was made available in November 2015, but the government refused to receive or publish the report, claiming that interviewing witnesses outside the borders of Lesotho is a breach of legal procedure. The commission had interviewed, as part of its investigations, the three opposition leaders living in exile in South Africa. On 14 December, Prime Minister Mosisili declared that the government would continue to refuse to receive the report until the High Court had settled a case by Lieutenant-Colonel Tefo Hashatsi, implicated in the assassination, challenging the legitimacy of the SADC inquiry. Hashatsi gave testimony to the commission between 31 August and 23 October 2015. In February 2016, the report was finally published. The commission called for the immediate removal of Tlali Kamoli as head of the army among other recommendations. Kamoli remained in the post until he was forced into retirement in November 2016. He was succeeded on 1 December 2016 by his deputy Lt-Gen Khoantle Motsomotso.

In January 2017, the Mahao family appealed to the SADC to oppose the government's handling of the murder investigation. In particular, they opposed the Amnesty Bill introduced in the National Assembly in November 2016 that would grant impunity for all crimes committed by security forces between 2007 and 2015. Professor Nqosa Mahao stated that "The Bill is a hardly veiled and cynical attempt by the government to protect and reward perpetrators of heinous crimes. The Bill is an affront to the rule of law and a license for impunity. It is yet again the clearest statement by the government that it is not intent on holding rogue elements in the LDF to account and amply captures the contempt with which it holds the international community."
