= Justin Lekhanya =

Military ruler of Lesotho from 1986 to 1991 (1938–2021)

General Justin Lekhanya
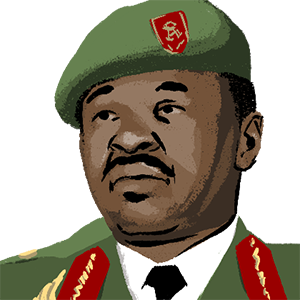
- An illustration of Lekhanya produced by Voice of America

1st Chairman of the Military Council
- In office 24 January 1986 – 2 May 1991
- Monarchs: Moshoeshoe II; Letsie III
- Preceded by: Leabua Jonathan
- Succeeded by: Elias Phisoana Ramaema

Personal details
- Born: Justin Metsing Lekhanya; 7 April 1938 Thaba-Tseka, Basutoland (now Thaba-Tseka, Lesotho)
- Died: 20 January 2021 (aged 82) Maseru, Lesotho
- Party: None (military officer)
- Other political affiliations: Basotho National Party
- Occupation: Soldier, politician

Military service
- Branch/service: Lesotho Defence Force
- Rank: General

General Justin Metsing Lekhanya (7 April 1938 – 20 January 2021) was the Minister of Defence and Chairman of the Military Council of Lesotho (head of government) from 24 January 1986 to 2 May 1991.

== Background ==
Born in Thaba-Tseka in 1938, Lekhanya completed his primary and secondary education in Roman Catholic Schools. After working as a migrant mine worker in South Africa, he joined the Basutoland Mounted Police in 1960. He became the only Mosotho officer heading a paramilitary Police Mobile Unit (PMU) platoon soon after its formation in 1965. During the early 1970s, he received trainings at police academies in South Africa and Rhodesia, and later assumed command of the PMU as a Major General in 1975. Lekhanya also oversaw its transformation into the Lesotho Paramilitary Force, later known as Lesotho Defence Force.

== In power ==
Lekhanya was commander of the army when he overthrew Prime Minister Leabua Jonathan in a 1986 military coup following revelations that he had been the victim of a hoax by two Pan-Africanist Congress military commanders exiled from South Africa, Potlako Leballo and Bernard Leeman. They had served Lekhanya as a Lesotho Paramilitary Force Major in 1977 under a false identity. The hoax had resulted in Lekhanya financing the Lesotho Liberation Army against himself.

Lekhanya immediately sought to improve relations with South Africa, which were strained due to Jonathan's support of the African National Congress. Lekhanya also gave more power to Lesotho's king at first, but later came into dispute with him, and he deposed the king in another military coup in 1990. The king was eventually restored in 1995, and Lekhanya was overthrown in a 1991 military coup.

== In opposition ==
Instead of retiring, Lekhanya contested the Mantsonyane constituency in the 1993 election as a BNP candidate but lost. Lekhanya then became leader of the Basotho National Party (BNP), an opposition party, replacing Retselisitsoe Sekhonyana, which had only a few seats in the parliament and, according to Lekhanya, was the victim of fraud in several elections. Lekhanya was elected as Party Leader of the BNP at its Conference in March 1999, and he was re-elected as Party Leader at the BNP Conference held on March 31–April 1, 2001.

In the May 2002 parliamentary election, Lekhanya, the BNP candidate for the Mant'sonyane constituency, was defeated by Masuthang Taole of the ruling Lesotho Congress for Democracy (LCD), receiving 28.5% of the vote against Taole's 49.1%. He was, however, elected to the National Assembly through proportional representation.

On 31 May 2006, Lekhanya was temporarily suspended from the National Assembly in connection with alleged intimidation of the Speaker of the National Assembly, which the BNP leadership was said to have condoned and abetted, according to a motion of the National Assembly and a subsequent report from the Committee of Privileges. Four other MPs from the BNP were also suspended, but for lesser periods of time.

In December 2010, Lekhanya was ousted as the party leader after a supermajority on a vote of no confidence on him.

On 20 January 2021, Lekhanya died at Makoanyane Military Hospital in Maseru.

Political offices
Preceded by Leabua Jonathan as Prime Minister of Lesotho	Chairman of the Military Council; 1986–1991	Succeeded by Elias Phisoana Ramaema
