= 1978 Non-Aligned Foreign Ministers Conference, Belgrade =

1978 Non-Aligned Foreign Ministers Conference
- Host country: Yugoslavia
- Date: 25–30 July 1978
- Cities: Belgrade
- Chair: Josip Broz Tito (President of Yugoslavia)

1978 Non-Aligned Foreign Ministers Conference was held in Belgrade, SR Serbia, SFR Yugoslavia, between 25 and 30 July 1978. The conference was organized as a preparatory event ahead of the divisive 6th Summit of the Non-Aligned Movement, which would take place in Havana in 1969. The NAM member states were deeply divided over Cuban military actions in Africa and the country's pro-Soviet politics, with some of them threatening to boycott the summit in Havana. The host country of Yugoslavia was recognized as the leader of the middle ground delegation, which wanted to overcome divisions and radicalism, and was supported primarily by India, Sri Lanka and Indonesia.

The conference followed another large international gathering in Belgrade, namely the Belgrade Follow-Up Meeting of the Conference on Security and Co-operation in Europe, which lasted between 4 October 1977 and 8 March 1978 and was aimed at implementation of the Helsinki Final Act. At the time, Yugoslav diplomacy was strongly committed to facilitate cooperation and joint peace efforts by non-aligned (Yugoslavia, Malta, Cyprus) and neutral (Finland, Austria, Switzerland) European countries and relaxation of strained relations between the Eastern and Western Bloc. The host country was therefore concerned about perceived radicalism among self-described progressive NAM members and their increasing prominence in the movement.

== Participants ==
Alongside 85 full Non-Aligned members at the time, the meeting welcomed the following observers: Barbados, Bolivia, Brazil, Colombia, Ecuador, Grenada, Mexico, Uruguay, Venezuela, ZANU–PF, Zimbabwe African People's Union, Socialist Party of Puerto Rico, South West Africa People’s Organisation, African National Congress of South Africa, Afro-Asian People's Solidarity Organisation, Arab League, Islamic Conference, Organization of African Unity, United Nations, Pan African 1st Congress of Azania.

Austria, Finland, Pakistan, Philippines, Portugal, Romania, San Marino, Sweden, Switzerland and United Nations Council for Namibia attended the conference as guests. Belize was granted special status, including the right to address the conference.

== See also ==
- Foreign relations of Yugoslavia
