= Commander of the Lesotho Defence Force =

- Incumbent; Lieutenant General Mojalefa Letsoela since 23 January 2018
- Reports to: Minister of Defence
- Appointer: Government of Lesotho
- Formation: 1978
- Website: Official website

The Commander of the Lesotho Defence Force is the professional head of the Defence Force. He is responsible for the administration and the operational control of the Lesotho military.

== List of chiefs ==
Portrait	Commander	Took office	Left office	Time in office	Defence branch	Ref.
Makhula Mosakeng	Lieutenant general Makhula Mosakeng	?	12 September 1998	?	Lesotho Army	
Makhula Mosakeng	Lieutenant general Makhula Mosakeng	2000	October 2004	3–4 years	Lesotho Army	
Thuso Motanyane	Lieutenant general Thuso Motanyane (born 1954)	October 2004	24 August 2011	6 years, 10 months	Lesotho Army	
Phatoli Lekanyane	Major general Phatoli Lekanyane	24 August 2011	15 March 2012	6 months	Lesotho Army	
Tlali Kamoli	Lieutenant general Tlali Kamoli (born 1966)	15 March 2012	29 August 2014	2 years, 6 months	Lesotho Army	
Maaparankoe Mahao	Lieutenant general Maaparankoe Mahao (1968–2015)	29 August 2014	February 2015	5 months	Lesotho Army	
Tlali Kamoli	Lieutenant general Tlali Kamoli (born 1966)	February 2015	1 December 2016	1 year, 10 months	Lesotho Army	
Khoantle Motšomotšo	Lieutenant general Khoantle Motšomotšo (?–2017)	1 December 2016	5 September 2017 †	278 days	Lesotho Army	
Lineo Poopa	Major general Lineo Poopa; Acting	5 September 2017	23 January 2018	171 days	Lesotho Army	
Mojalefa Letsoela	Lieutenant general Mojalefa Letsoela	23 January 2018	Incumbent	8 years, 227 days	Lesotho Air Squadron	
