= Robert Sobukwe =

Founding president of the Pan Africanist Congress (1924–1978)

- "Africa for Africans"

President of the Pan Africanist Congress
- In office 9 April 1959 – 1963
- Succeeded by: Potlako Leballo

Personal details
- Born: 5 December 1924 Graaff-Reinet, Cape Province, Union of South Africa
- Died: 27 February 1978 (aged 53) Kimberley, Cape Province, South Africa
- Cause of death: Lung cancer
- Party: Pan Africanist Congress
- Spouse: Veronica Sobukwe (m. 1954–1978)
- Children: Miliswa Sobukwe (daughter); Dinilesizwe Sobukwe (son); Dalindyebo Sobukwe (son); Dedanizizwe Sobukwe (son)
- Education: University of Fort Hare; University of London
- Occupation: Teacher and lawyer

Robert Mangaliso Sobukwe OMSG (5 December 1924 – 27 February 1978) was a South African anti-apartheid revolutionary and founding member of the Pan Africanist Congress (PAC), serving as the first president of the organization.

Sobukwe was regarded as a strong proponent of an Africanist future for South Africa and opposed political collaboration with anyone other than Africans, defining "African" as anyone who lives in and pays allegiance to Africa and who is prepared to subject themselves to African majority rule. In March 1960, Sobukwe organized and launched a non-violent protest campaign against pass laws, for which he was sentenced to three years in prison on grounds of incitement. In 1963, the enactment of the "Sobukwe Clause," allowed an indefinite renewal of his prison sentence, and Sobukwe was subsequently relocated to Robben Island for solitary confinement. At the end of his sixth year at Robben Island, he was released and placed under house arrest until his death in 1978.

== Early life ==
=== Childhood: 1924–1947 ===
Sobukwe was born in Graaff-Reinet in the Eastern Cape Province on 5 December 1924. Robert Sobukwe was the youngest child. He had five siblings which consisted of four brothers and one sister. While his father who was from Lesotho worked as a general store clerk and part-time woodcutter, Sobukwe's Xhosa mother served as a domestic worker in white homes and as cook at the local hospital. Robert's earliest education was a mission school in Graaff Reinet located in South Africa. His older brother was his first real exposure to literature at an early when at age 15, Sobukwe continued and eventually completed his secondary education at the Healdtown Institute, which provided a Methodist Christian and liberal arts education to all students. He spent six years at Healdtown Institute where he spent six years studying with financial assistance from George Caley. There he earned his Junior Certificate. When he finished his education there he enrolled for a Primary Teachers' Training Course for two years. However he didn't receive a teaching post. Later on Sobukwe's education went on a pause in 1943 when he suffered from tuberculosis.

=== Fort Hare: 1947–1949 ===
In 1947, Sobukwe enrolled at the South African Native College at Fort Hare, the premier undergraduate institution for black students of his time. Sobukwe registered for a BA at Fort Hare, majoring in English, Xhosa, and Native Administration. Although Sobukwe was initially not interested in politics, his study of Native Administration (relating to the administration of South Africa's Bantustans), combined with his exposure to politics at Fort Hare, made Sobukwe keener to the topic. Later on, he became more focused on poetry and drama. His focus on politics was driven by the influence of his lecturer, Cecil Ntloko. He was a follower of the All-African Convention (AAC). Sobukwe and his three friends started a daily publication called Beware. The publication had non-collaboration and critiques of Native Representative Councils and Native Advisory Boards.

He joined the African National Congress Youth League (ANCYL) in 1948. The organizational branch had been established on the university campus by Godfrey Pitje, who later became its president. In 1949, Sobukwe was elected as the first president of the Fort Hare Students' Representative Council, where he proved himself to be a distinguished orator. In 1949, Sobukwe met Veronica Mathe at Alice Hospital. The couple later got married in 1950.

== Mainstream politics ==
=== Standerton: 1950–1954 ===
In 1950, Sobukwe was appointed as a teacher at a high school in Standerton, a position he lost when he spoke out in favour of the Defiance Campaign in 1952; he was, however, later reinstated. In 1952, Sobukwe achieved notoriety backing the Defiance Campaign. During this period he was not directly involved with mainstream ANC activities, but still held the position of secretary of the organisation's branch in Standerton.

=== Johannesburg: 1954–1959 ===
In 1954, after moving to Johannesburg, Sobukwe became a lecturer of African Studies at the University of the Witwatersrand. As a lecturer he earned the nickname "The Prof." During his time in Johannesburg he became editor of The Africanist newspaper and soon began to criticise the ANC for allowing itself to be dominated by which he termed "liberal-left-multi-racialists". He stood for an Africanist Socialist Democracy. was an ardent supporter of Africanist views about liberation in South Africa and rejected the idea of working with Whites.

=== Pan-Africanist Congress: 1959–1960 ===
==== Formation and ideology ====
Sobukwe was a strong believer in an Africanist future for South Africa and rejected any model suggesting working with anyone other than Africans, defining African as anyone who lives in and pays his allegiance to Africa and who is prepared to subject himself to African majority rule. He grew discontented with the progress of the liberation struggle during the 1950s, in which the apartheid government continually introduced new means to suppress the liberation struggle. Resonating with many members of the ANC, Sobukwe had become impatient with the ANC's inability to achieve results. Sobukwe, an anticommunist, also rejected the ANC's alliance with the South African Communist Party. He later left the ANC to form the Pan Africanist Congress (PAC), and was elected its first President in 1959.

Inaugural Congress

The Pan Africanist Congress (PAC) was held in Orlando from April 4 until April 6. It was at this congress where Sobukwe was unanimously elected the parties first president. The people elected Sobukwe because of his eloquence as a public speaker while also being very intelligent and a commitment and passion for the cause which easily allowed the people to rally around him. In his inaugural speech he focused on his stance of multi-racialism and how he fondly disagrees with that idea. Instead he was for non-racialism and he brought that idea into the PAC.

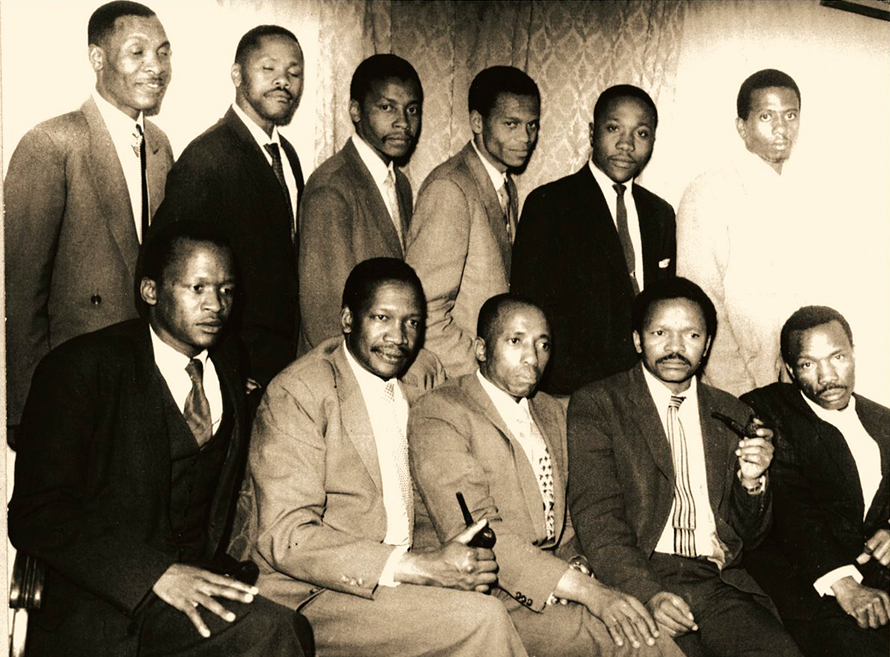
Robert Sobukwe (front row, second from left) with the other founding members of the Pan Africanist Congress in 1957.

Sobukwe became known as the Professor or simply "Prof" to his close comrades and followers, a testament to his educational achievements and powers of speech and persuasion. He spoke of the need for black South Africans to "liberate themselves" without the help of non-Africans; Sobukwe defined non-Africans as anyone who lives in Africa or abroad Africa and who does not pay his allegiance to Africa and who is not prepared to subject himself to African majority rule. His strong convictions and active resistance inspired many other individuals and organisations involved in the anti-apartheid movement, notably the Black Consciousness Movement.

Sobukwe argued that whites should be excluded from the ANC as it was impossible to have a relationship between blacks and whites until further progress had been made. He argued that a reliance on whites would disempower the realization that many of these Africans had, that they had the power to overtake a society that had been taken from them. Sobukwe rejected collaboration with sympathetic whites as he considered such multi-racial cooperation between slave owner and slave as an "ungodly alliance" before equality was attained.

==== Anti-pass campaign of 1960 ====
On 21 March 1960, the PAC led a nationwide protest against the pass laws which required black people to carry a pass book at all times. Sobukwe led a march to the local police station at Orlando, Soweto, in order to openly defy the laws. He was joined en route by a few followers and, after presenting his pass to a police officer, he purposely made himself guilty under the terms of the pass law of being present in a region/area other than that allowed as per his papers. In a similar protest on the same day in Sharpeville, police opened fire on a crowd of PAC supporters, killing 69 in the Sharpeville Massacre. In the aftermath, Sobukwe was taken without a fair trial and both the ANC and PAC were banned. Other organizations such as Steve Bikos's Black Consciousness Movement were inspired by the actions of Sobukwe.

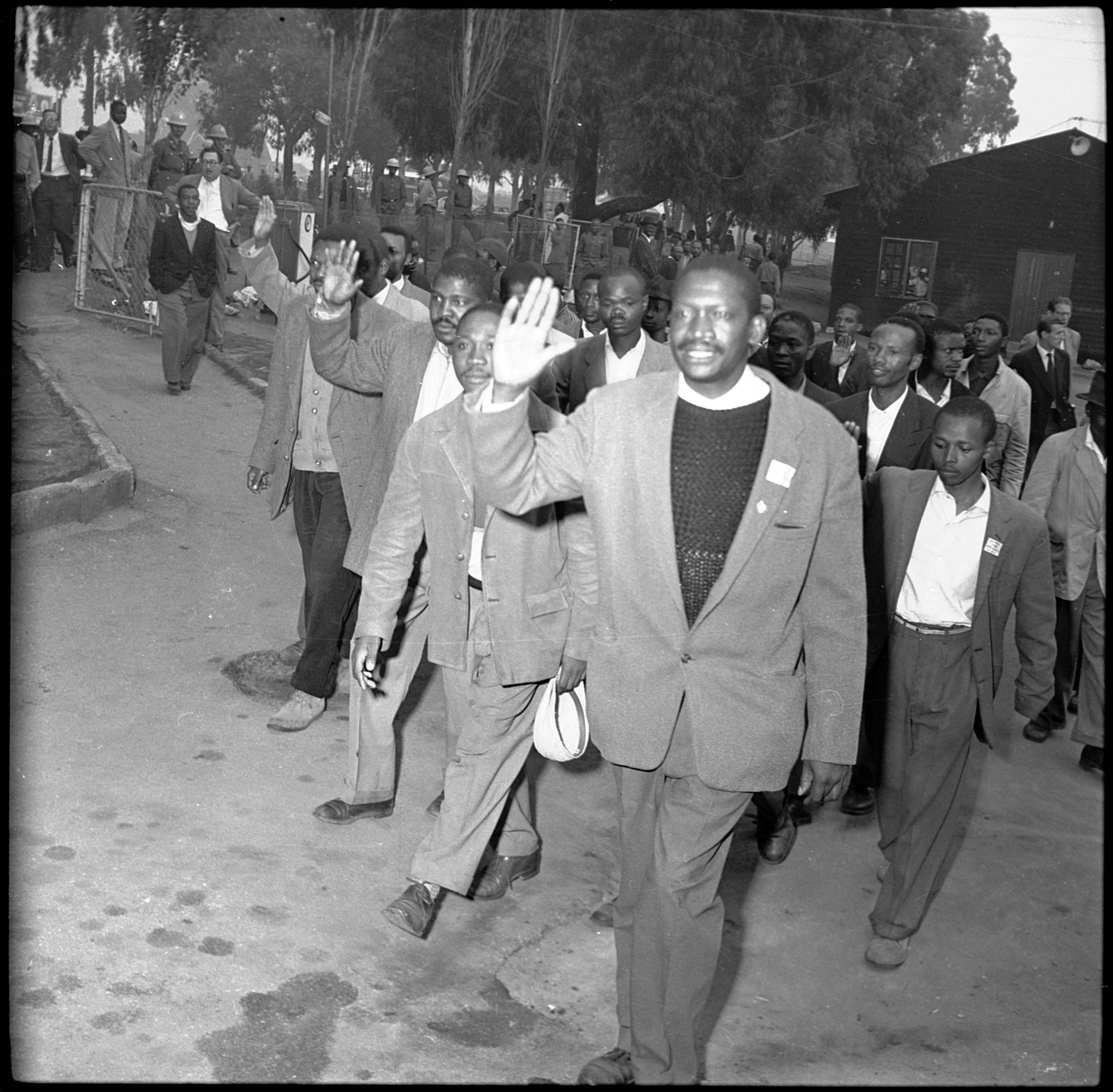
Robert Sobukwe leads anti-apartheid protest

== Imprisonment ==
=== Initial imprisonment: 1960–1963 ===
Following Sobukwe's arrest after the Sharpeville massacre, he was charged with and convicted of incitement, and sentenced to three years in prison. He served one year of his sentence in Witbank Prison (1960—1961) followed by two years in Pretoria Gaol (1961—1963). On October 4, 1961, Robert Sobukwe wrote a letter to Benjamin Pogrund explaining to him that he could write and receive one letter per week and have one visit per week. With this type of permission, with his imprisonment at Pretoria Gaol; Robert was able to write regularly to people and see his wife frequently. In a later letter by Robert to Veronica on June 19, 1962 he found out that his wife came to visit him but was turned away due to a visiting error. Robert had no visitors that month, and because of that, he wouldn't accept any visitors unless they were accompanied by his wife or his wife had informed him of who they were and given him warning.

=== Robben Island: 1963–1969 ===
As the end of Sobukwe's three-year sentence approached, the National Party parliament passed the General Law Amendment Act, which introduced a clause allowing for political dissidents to be indefinitely detained. This allowed Sobukwe's sentence to be renewed for an additional six years, which he spent on Robben Island. The clause became known as the "Sobukwe Clause" as no other individual was sentenced under this provision. At Robben Island, Sobukwe was in company of other revolutionaries in liberation struggle such as Nelson Mandela, Johnson Mlambo, and John Nyathi Pokela, among many others.

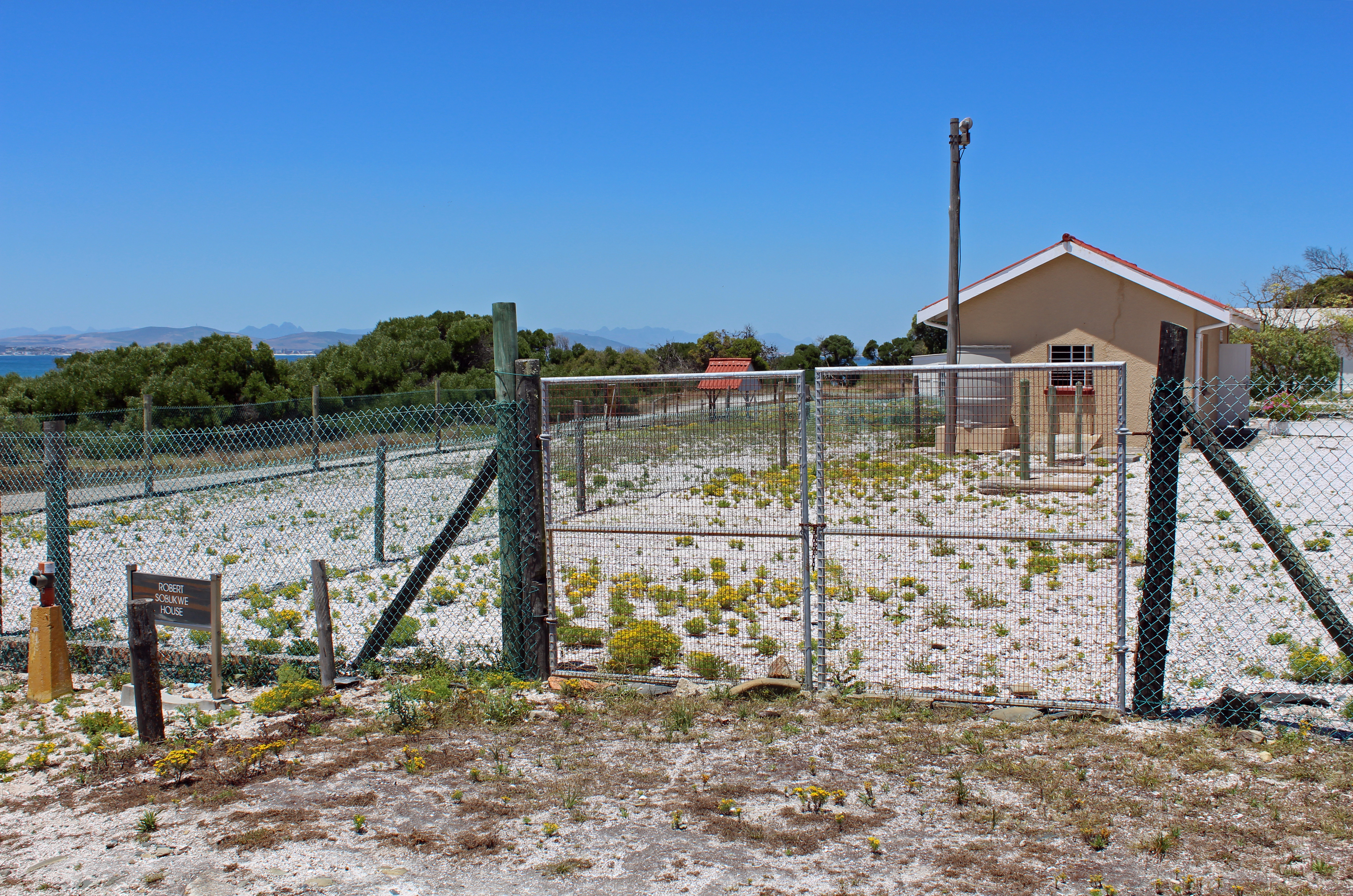
House on Robben Island where Sobukwe was kept in solitary confinement

Sobukwe was kept in solitary confinement but enjoyed a unique prisoner-plus status; he was permitted certain privileges including books, magazines, newspapers, civilian clothing, etc. He lived in a separate area on the island and was strictly prohibited from contact with other prisoners, though Sobukwe was able to communicate sporadically through visual signals while outside for exercise. He studied during this time and received (among others) a degree in economics from the University of London. It is speculated that Sobukwe was subjected to this special treatment because the South African government had profiled him as a greater troublemaker than the regular ANC prisoners. Sobukwe's son disputes terming this treatment as "special".

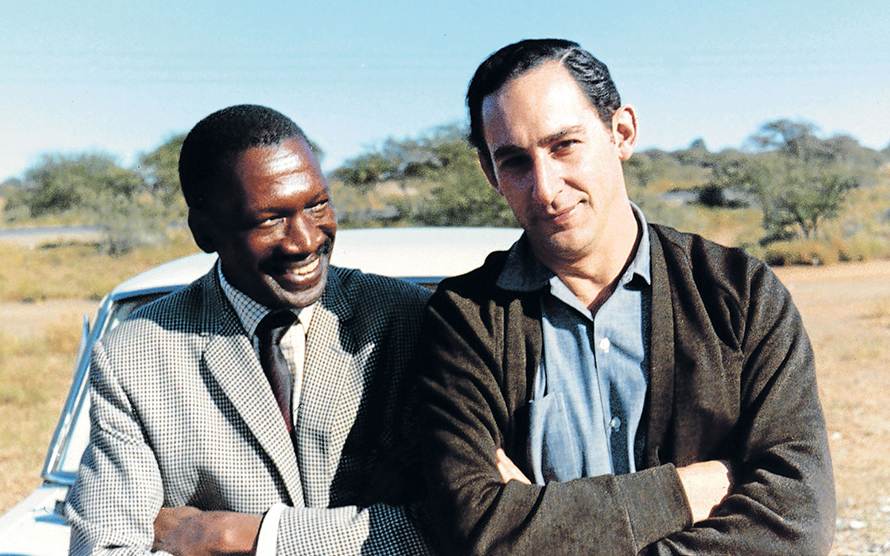
Robert Sobukwe with his friend Benjamin Pogrund after Sobukwe’s release from Robben Island in 1969. Pogrund, a journalist, is the author of the biography Robert Sobukwe – How can Man Die Better.

Throughout his imprisonment, Sobukwe maintained communication with his friend Benjamin Pogrund who later became his biographer.

=== House arrest: 1969–1978 ===
As authorities recognized Sobukwe's deteriorating physical and mental health, he was released from Robben Island in 1969. Sobukwe was allowed to live in Kimberley with his family but remained under house arrest. Kimberley was suggested as an area where he could not easily foster subversive activities and also a place where he could live and work while being easily monitored by the state. He was also restricted through a banning order, which disallowed political activities.

Various restrictions barred Sobukwe from travelling overseas, thus curtailing his attempts to further his education. In 1964, Sobukwe was offered a job by the National Association for the Advancement of Coloured People and the Montgomery Fellowship for foreign Aid in the US. He applied to leave the country with his family to accept the job however, was denied permission by the minister of Justice, John Vorster. In 1970, Sobukwe applied and was hired for a teaching post at the University of Wisconsin, however the apartheid government denied his request for a passport even though the US government had assured him that he would have been able to obtain his visa. When he applied for his whole family to leave South Africa, they were denied again as a whole by the government to leave South Africa. The only excpetion to this was if it was a family gathering. Only then was he allowed to leave house arrest and leave Kimberly. In 1973, Sobukwe was given permission by the government to leave Kimberly in order to attend to his son Dalindyebo, who was hospitalized in Johannesburg. In June 1974, Sobukwe spent three days Johannesburg to attend to his wife who had just undergone surgery. In 1975 when his mother died, he was given permission to leave Kimberly to attend to the funeral. Sobukwe completed his law degree with the help of a local lawyer, in Galeshewe, and he then started his own practice in 1975 in Kimberley.

== Illness and death ==
In early 1977, Sobukwe fell ill and applied for permission to receive medical treatment; his request was denied indefinitely until the intervention of his friend Benjamin Pogrund. Subsequently, in September 1977, Sobukwe travelled to Johannesburg where he was diagnosed with lung cancer and then transferred to Groote Schuur; a hospital in Cape Town. Although the South African government granted Sobukwe access to treatment, they imposed strict conditions on his travel; They also did not allow any visitors except for family. Sobukwe was required to report to a police station every time he left Kimberley or arrived at the hospital. He died from complications of lung cancer on 27 February 1978 and was buried in Graaff-Reinet on 11 March 1978.

== Legacy ==
Sobukwe has become a key historical figure in the black liberation struggle of South Africa. Robert was passionate about the freedom of Africa. He was nicknamed 'The Prof' because he believed that education was the ultimate weapon with which black Africans could free themselves from mental and physical modern-day oppression. His vision of a society dedicated to individual rights, irrespective of race or ethnicity, is shared by many of his contemporaries such as in elements of the ANC and Pan-Africanists.^{:478} In Sobukwe's 1959 PAC inaugural speech, he shared a sentiment that continues to be quoted by anti-racism rhetoric in popular media, as he stated:

There is only one race to which we all belong, and that is the human race. In our vocabulary therefore, the word 'race' as applied to man, has no plural form. "In 1955 the Kilptown Charter was adopted, which according to us, is irreconcilable conflict with the 1949 Programme seeing that it claims land no longer Africa, but is auctioned for sale to all who live in this country. We have come to the parting of the ways and we are here and now giving notice that we are disassociating ourselves from the ANC as it is constituted at present in the Transvaal.”

Following Sobukwe's imprisonment and the official South African banning of the anti-apartheid parties in 1960, the influence of the Pan-Africanist Congress steadily waned and was eventually overshadowed again by the African National Congress. The PAC, along with many other anti-apartheid organizations, were forced to move to underground operations. Under the leadership of Potlako Leballo, the PAC came to sponsor and create a paramilitary wing Poqo. Leballo's revolutionary rhetoric inspired the planning of violent operations, ultimately leading to the public arrest of 3,246 PAC and Poqo members.

Rhodes University celebrated Robert Sobukwe's life and renamed a male residence after his name. This was a tribute to him to show the youth that his life and love for education will never leave. His educational achievements and powers of speech and persuasion are a part of what he's known for. In 2012, Robert Sobukwe Street in Pretoria (formerly known as Esselen Street) was renamed after him in commemoration of his contributions to the black liberation struggle. Similarly, in 2013, Robert Sobukwe Road in Cape Town (formerly known as Modderdam Road) was renamed after him. Central Block at the University of the Witwatersrand was renamed to Robert Sobukwe Block in 2016 following major support among students and alumni. Sobukwe's strong conviction and active resistance inspired many individuals and other organizations involved in the anti-apartheid movement and, notably, the Black Consciousness Movement.

In 2023, it was proposed for Robert Sobukwe's birthplace (Graaff-Reinet) to be named after him. The name change from Graaff-Reinet to Robert Sobukwe Town was approved in January 2026 by the Minister of Sport, Arts and Culture, with the change taking effect in February 2026.

In 2026 the grave of Sobukwe was vandalized twice. It was not for the first time, as it has been vandalized since 2001.

== See also ==
- Benjamin Pogrund, author of Robert Sobukwe's biography Sobukwe and Apartheid (1990) and How Can Man Die Better: The Life of Robert Sobukwe (2003)
- List of people subject to banning orders under apartheid
