= Benjamin Pogrund =

South African-Israeli journalist (born 1933)

Benjamin Pogrund OIS (Hebrew: בנימין פוגרונד; born 1933) is a South African-born Israeli author.

== Biography ==
Benjamin Pogrund was brought up in Cape Town. He began a career as a journalist in 1958, writing for The Rand Daily Mail in Johannesburg, where he eventually became deputy-editor. The Rand Daily Mail was the only newspaper in South Africa at that time to report on events in black South African townships. In the course of his work he came to know the major players in the apartheid struggle and gained the respect and confidence of leaders such as Nelson Mandela.

Pogrund was a reporter at the Sharpeville massacre on 21 March 1960. He was author of a 1965 series on beating and torture of black inmates and maltreatment of white political prisoners based on a series of interviews with Harold Strachan. During his career reporting on apartheid in South Africa he was put on trial several times, put in prison once, had his passport revoked and was investigated as a threat to the state by security police.

The Rand Daily Mail ceased publication in 1985 and Pogrund left for London in 1986. There he was the foreign editor at London's Today, and later chief foreign sub-editor of The Independent, London. Later he was editor of The WorldPaper in Boston, and reported from South Africa in The Sunday Times. He has authored books on Robert Sobukwe, Nelson Mandela and the South African press under apartheid.

Pogrund emigrated to Israel in 1997. He settled in Jerusalem with his wife Anne, an artist. He is the founder of Yakar's Centre for Social Concern. He was a member of the Israeli delegation to the United Nations World Conference against Racism in Durban.

== Views and opinions ==
For decades, Pogrund pushed back on the application of the term “apartheid” to Israel. According to Pogrund, the term apartheid was being used falsely as a charge against Israel: "Anyone who knows what apartheid was, and who knows Israel today, is aware of that. Use of the apartheid label is at best ignorant and naïve and at worst cynical and manipulative."

In 2020, however, he stated that his assessment might change if Benjamin Netanyahu went ahead with his 2020 electoral proposal to annex the West Bank, stating that if the plan were to be implemented, his evaluation would differ:'[At] least it has been a military occupation. Now we are going to put other people under our control and not give them citizenship. That is apartheid. That is an exact mirror of what apartheid was [in South Africa].'

In 2023, following the rise of Israel's extremist-populated 37th government, he stated in Haaretz: “We deny Palestinians any hope of freedom and normal lives. We believe our own propaganda that a few million people will meekly accept perpetual inferiority and oppression. The government is driving Israel deeper and deeper into inhuman, cruel behavior beyond any defense. I don’t have to be religious to know that this is a shameful betrayal of Jewish morality and history. I have argued with all my might against the accusation that Israel is an apartheid state: in lectures, newspaper articles, on TV and in a book. However, the accusation is becoming fact.”

== Recognition and awards ==
Pogrund was the recipient of the 2005-06 Dr. Jean Mayer Global Citizenship Award.

== Published works ==
- How can man die better: The life of Robert Sobukwe ISBN 1-86842-050-7
- Shared Histories: A Palestinian-Israeli Dialogue (Left Coast Press, 30, 2005) ISBN 1-59874-012-1
- War of Words: Memoir of a South African Journalist. Seven Stories Press. 2000. ISBN 1-888363-71-1.
- Sobukwe and Apartheid (New Jersey:Rutgers Univ Press, 1991; Johannesburg: Jonathan Ball Publishers, 1991) ISBN 0-8135-1693-5
- Drawing Fire: Investigating the Accusations of Apartheid in Israel. Rowman & Littlefield, 2014 ISBN 978-1-4422-2684-5

=== Articles ===
- Why depict Israel as a chamber of horrors like no other in the world?, The Guardian, 8 February 2006
- Palestinians and Israelis must be able to meet to talk peace, Daily Star, 27 June 2006

=== Children's books ===
- Nelson Mandela: Leader Against Apartheid (World Peacemakers) (Blackbirch Press, 2003) ISBN 1-56711-978-6

== See also ==
- South African Jews
