= 1986 Lesotho coup d'état =

Military overthrow of Leabua Jonathan

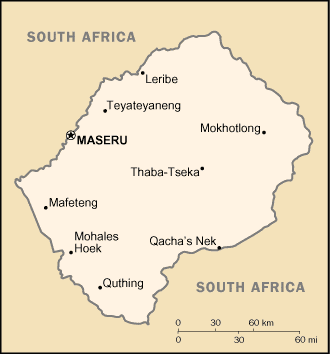
- A CIA WFB map of Lesotho
- Date: 20 January 1986
- Location: (Lesotho) Maseru
- Type: Military coup
- Motive: Regime change
- Organised by: Justin Lekhanya
- Participants: Lesotho Defence Force (faction)
- Outcome: Coup succeeds: Overthrow of authoritarian BNP government of Prime Minister Jonathan.; The establishment of military rule under the Military Council headed by General Lekhanya.; Deposition of King Moshoeshoe II in favour of his son Letsie III in 1990.

The 1986 Lesotho coup d'état was a military coup that took place in Lesotho on 20 January 1986, led by General Justin Lekhanya. It led to the deposition of Prime Minister Leabua Jonathan, who held the office since 1965 and assumed dictatorial powers in the 1970 coup d'état, after the general election was annulled.

General Lekhanya announced the creation of the Military Council, which would exercise all executive and legislative powers in the name of King Moshoeshoe II. Eventually, a power struggle developed between Lekhanya and the King, with the latter being forced into exile in the United Kingdom in February 1990, and officially dethroned in November of that year. Lekhanya himself was deposed in the 1991 coup d'état, led by Colonel Elias Phisoana Ramaema.
