= Pokela =

Pokela is a surname. Notable people with the surname include:

- Martti Pokela (1924–2007), Finnish folk musician
- John Nyathi Pokela (1922–1985), South African political activist
