= Mathibeli =

Mathibeli is an African given name and surname. Notable people with the name include:

- Mathibeli Mokhothu (born 1977), Lesotho educator and politician
- Teboho Mathibeli (born 1970), Lesotho boxer
