= Military ranks of Lesotho =

The Military ranks of Lesotho are the military insignia used by the Lesotho Defence Force. Being a landlocked country and an enclave surrounded entirely by South Africa, Lesotho does not have a navy.

== Commissioned officer ranks ==
The rank insignia of commissioned officers.

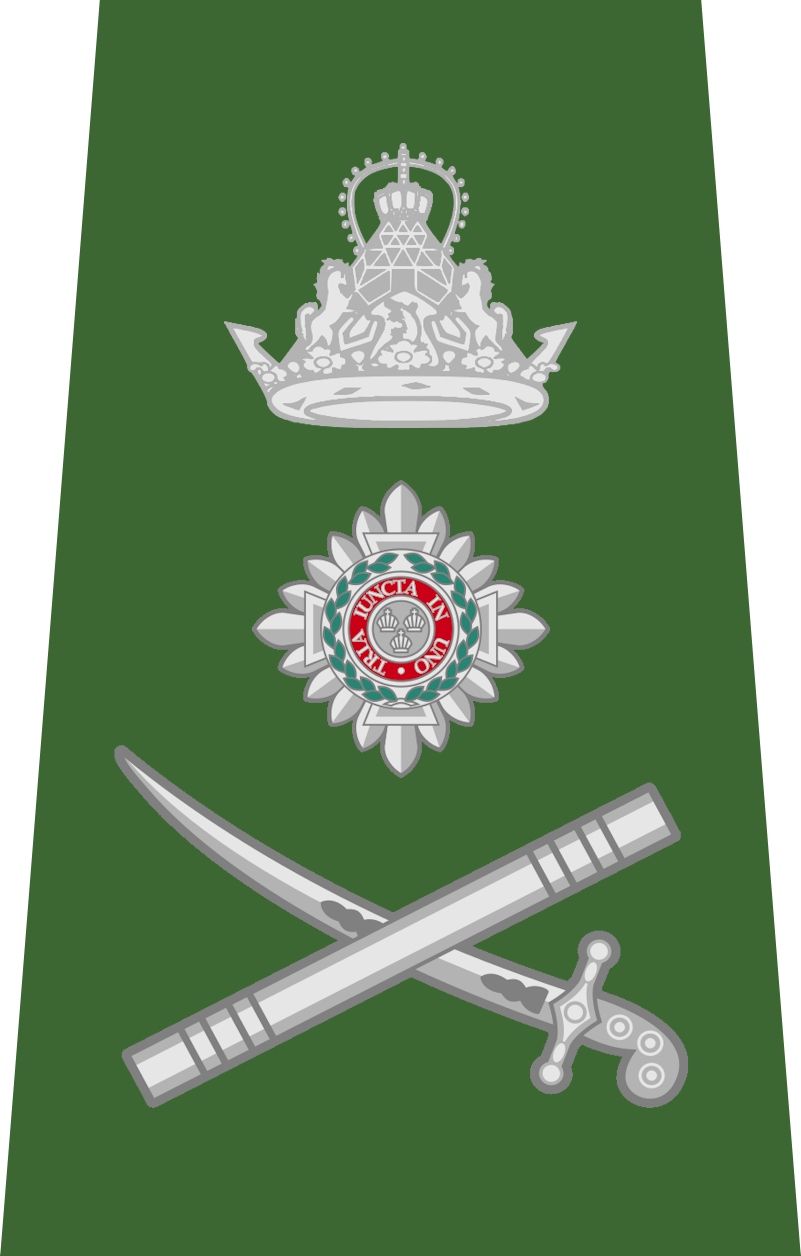
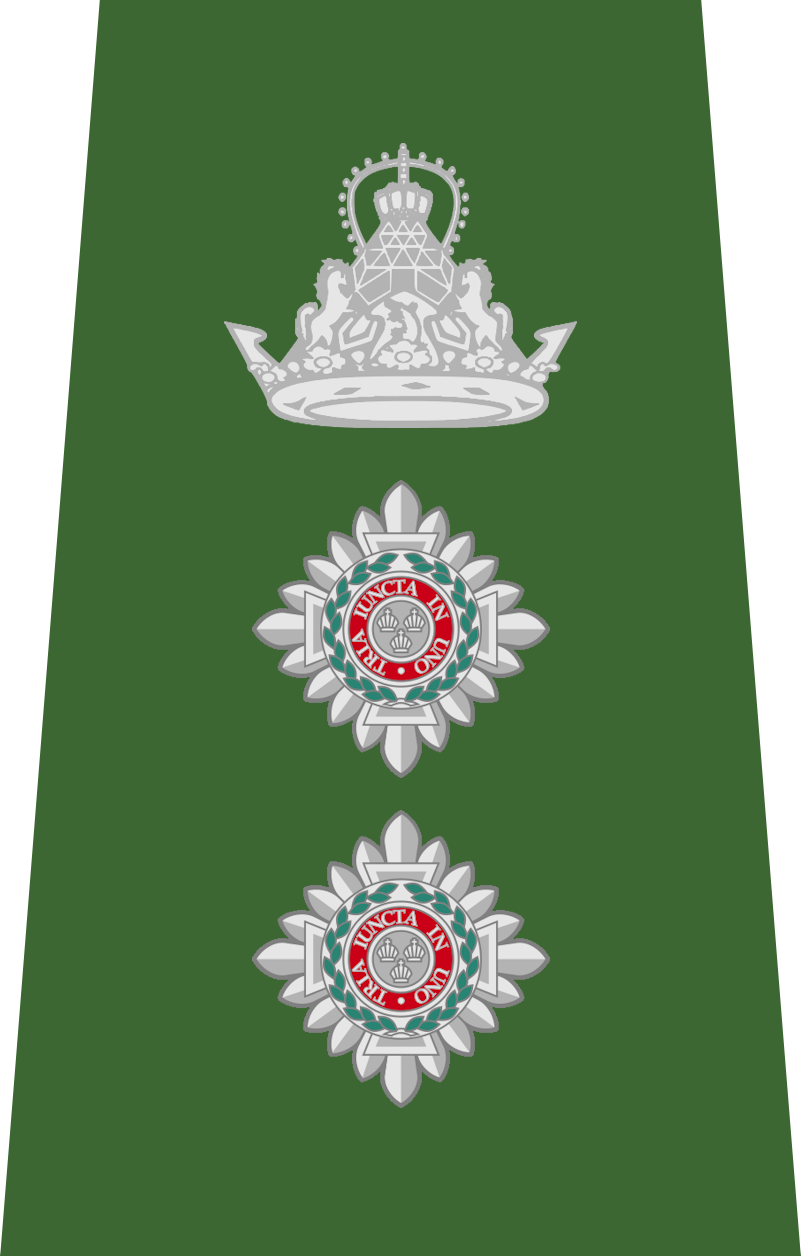
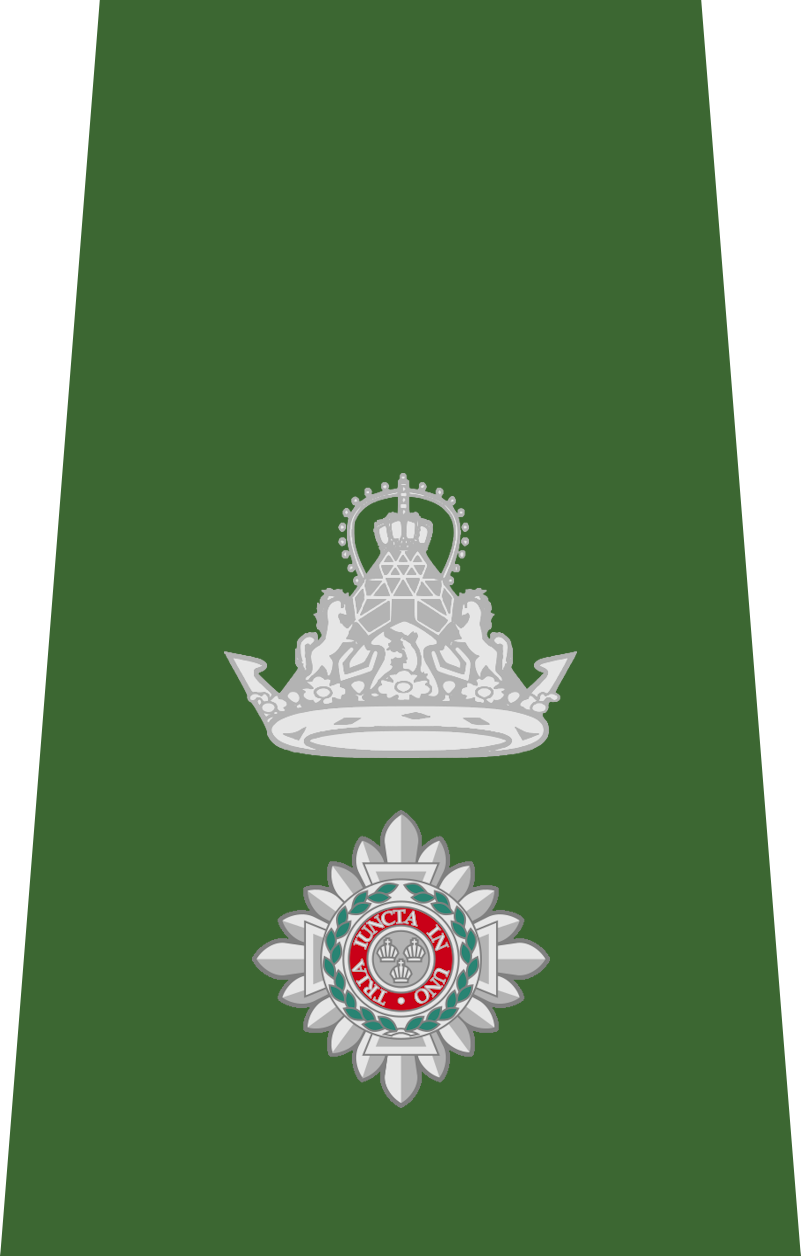
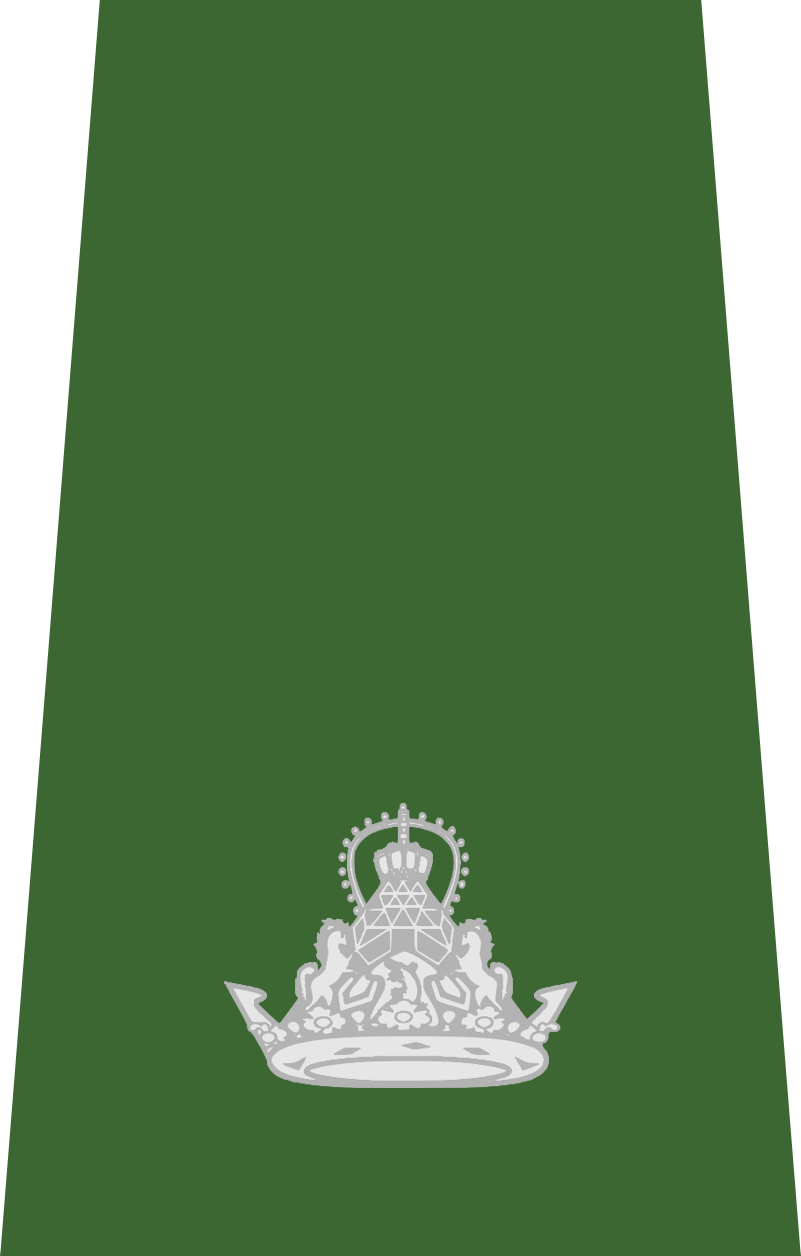
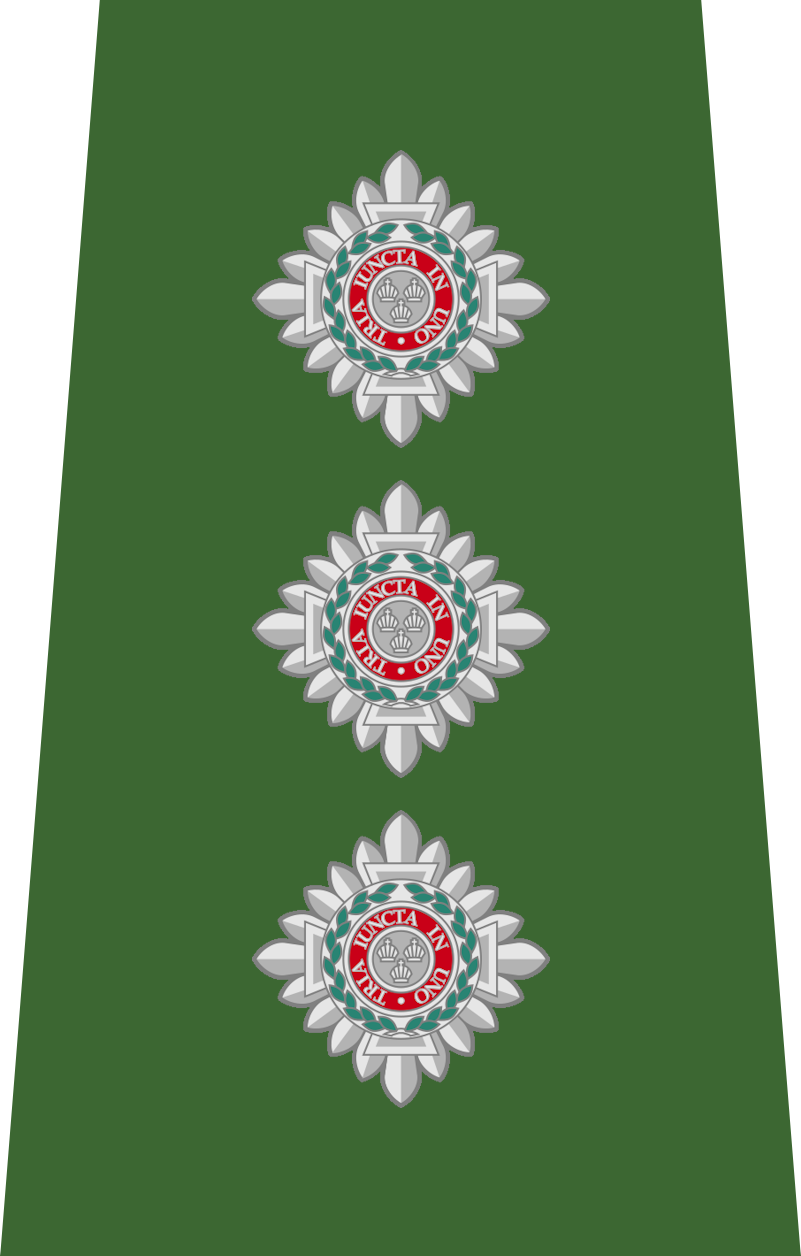
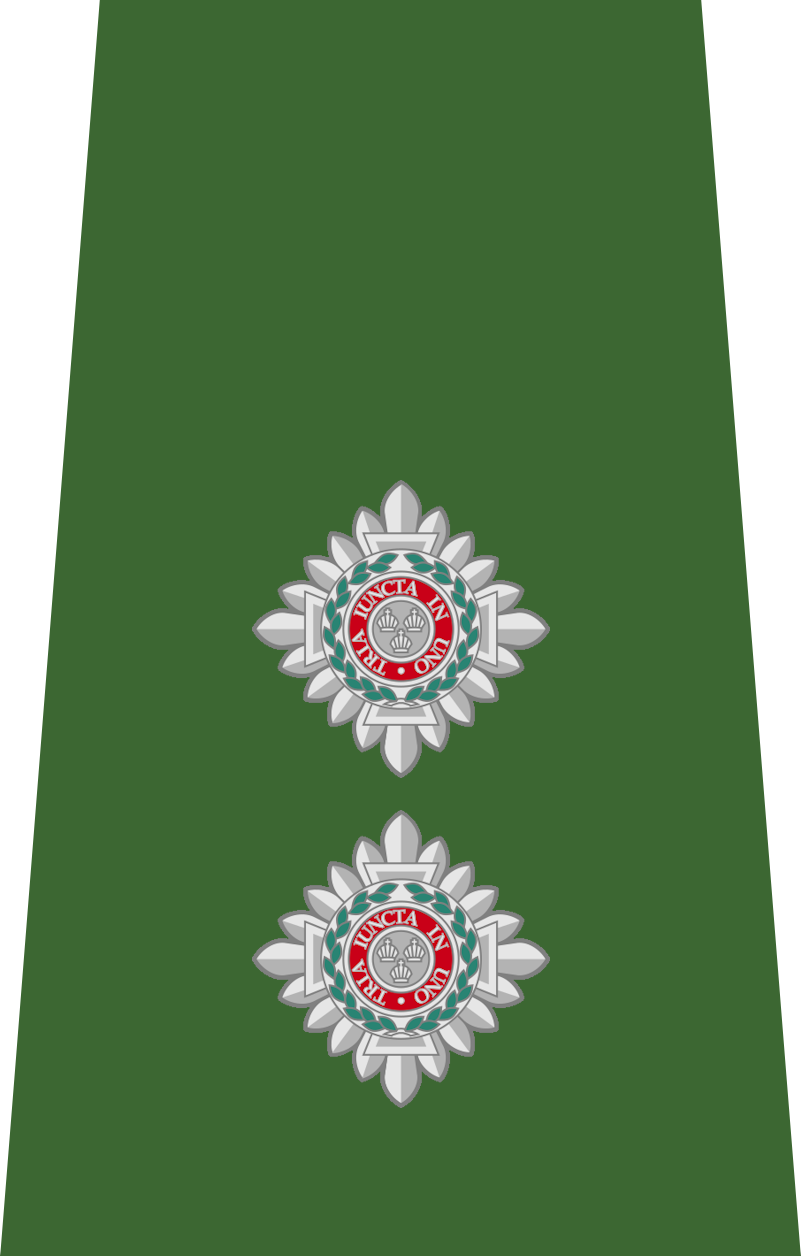
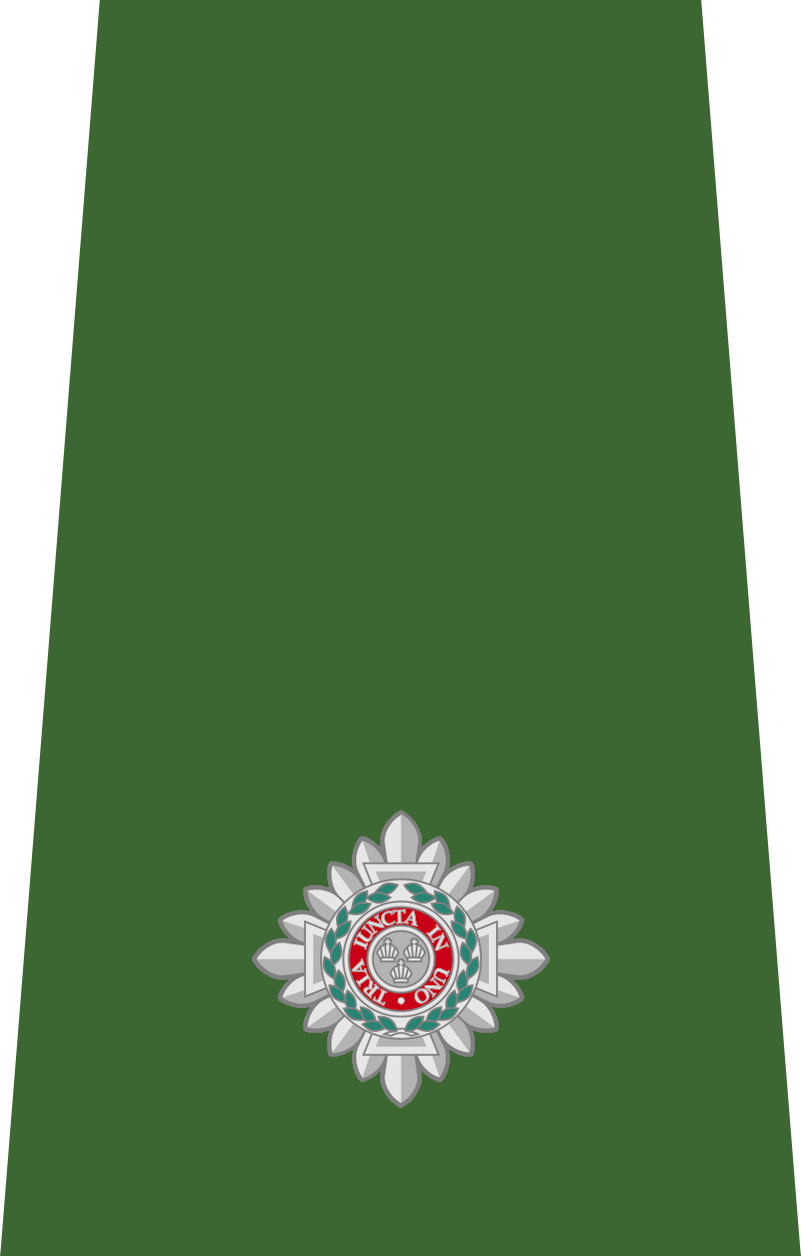
Rank group	General / flag officers				Senior officers			Junior officers
Lesotho Army
Lesotho Army	Field marshal	Lieutenant general	Major general	Brigadier	Colonel	Lieutenant colonel	Major	Captain	Lieutenant	Second lieutenant
Lesotho Air Squadron
Lesotho Air Squadron		Lieutenant general	Major general	Brigadier	Colonel	Lieutenant colonel	Major	Captain	First lieutenant	Second lieutenant
Rank group	General / flag officers				Senior officers			Junior officers

== Other ranks ==
The rank insignia of non-commissioned officers and enlisted personnel.

Rank group	Senior NCOs				Junior NCOs		Enlisted
Lesotho Army							No insignia
Lesotho Army	Warrant officer class 1	Warrant officer class 2	Staff sergeant	Sergeant	Corporal	Lance corporal	Private (or equivalent)
Lesotho Air Squadron							No insignia
Lesotho Air Squadron	Warrant officer class 1	Warrant officer class 2	Staff sergeant	Sergeant	Corporal	Lance corporal	Private (or equivalent)
Rank group	Senior NCOs				Junior NCOs		Enlisted

== Historic ranks ==
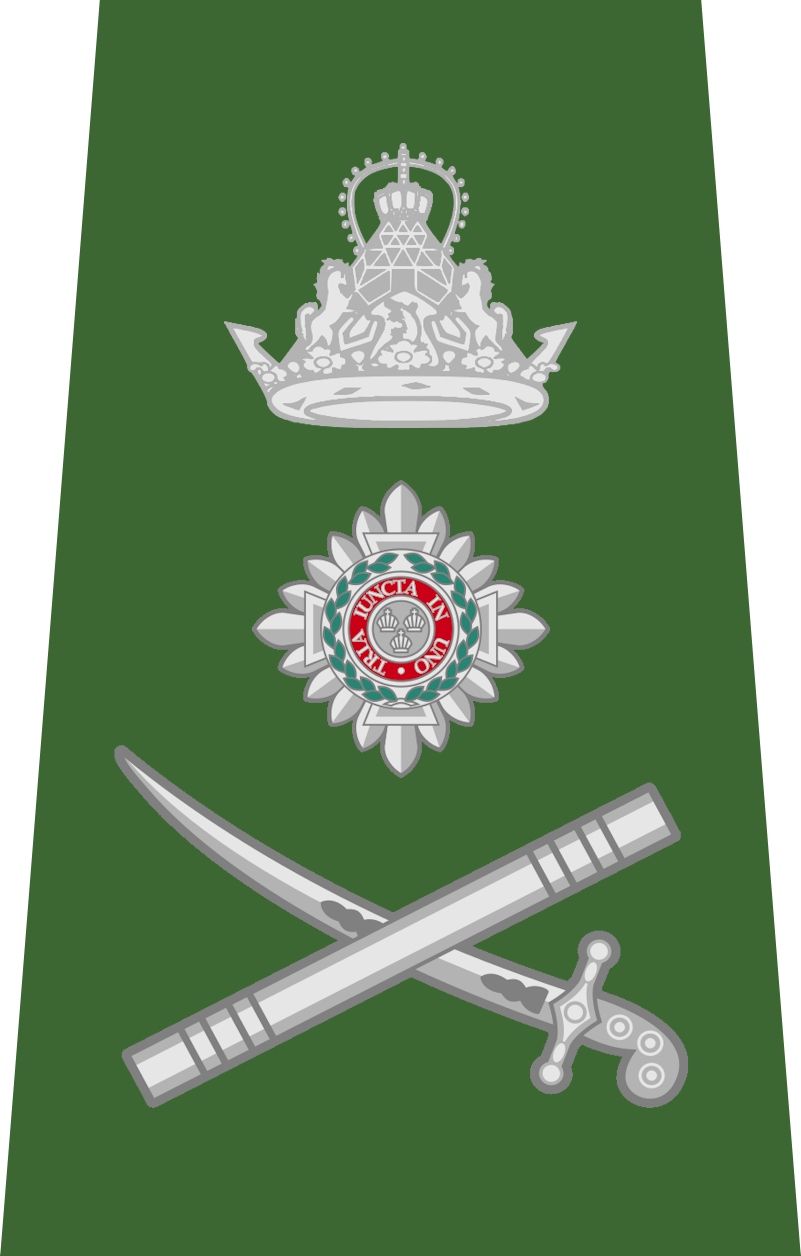
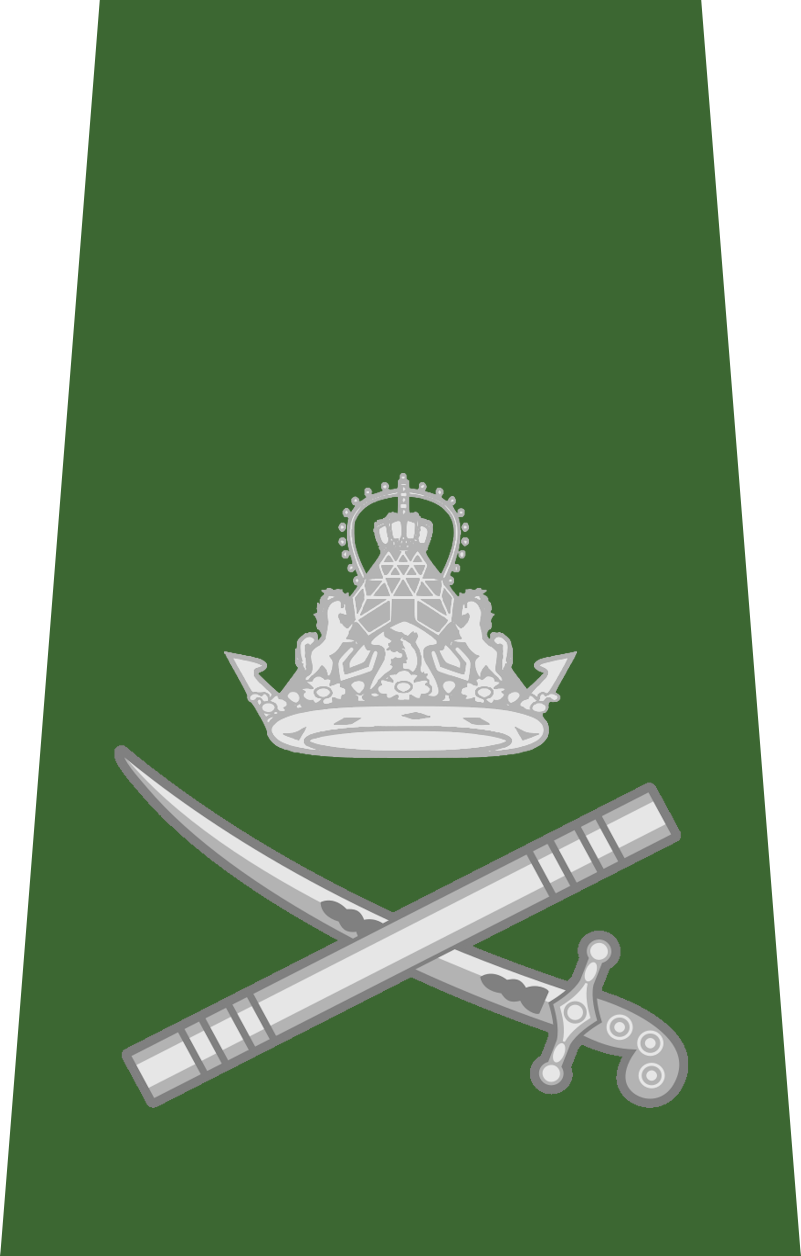
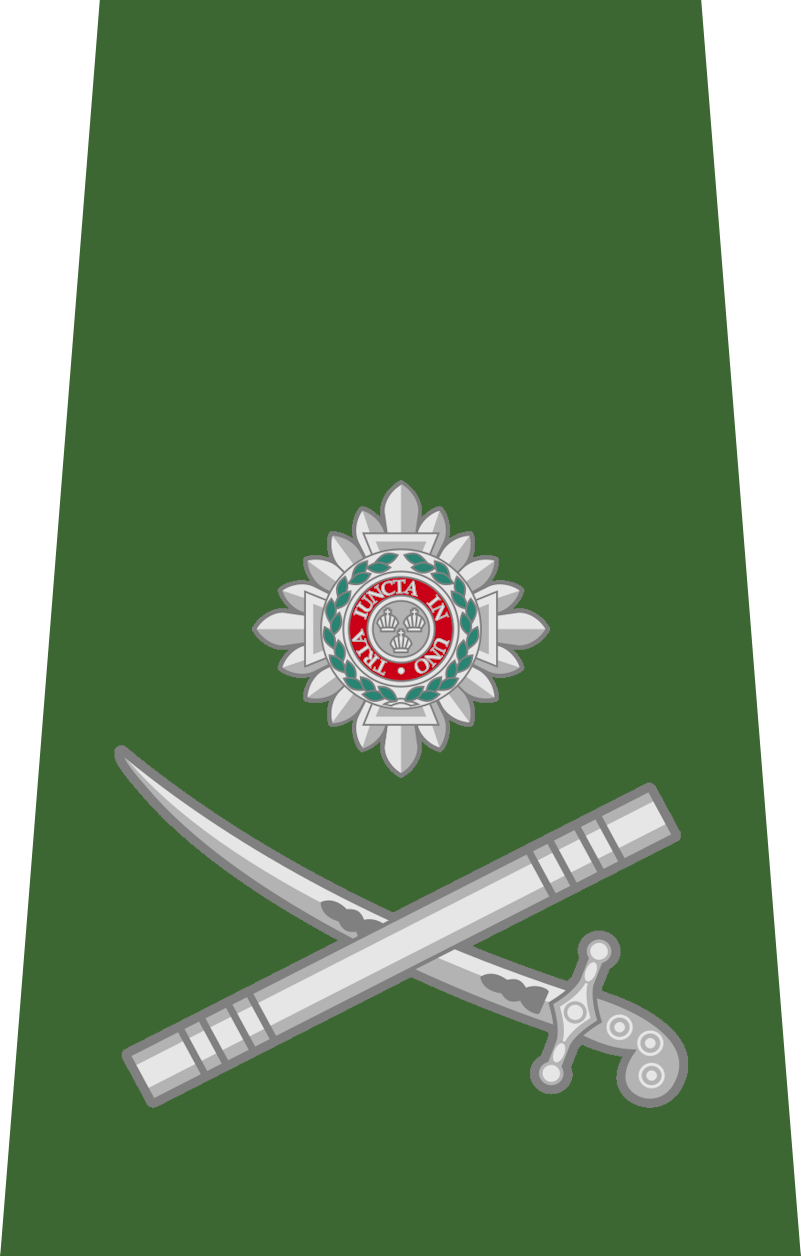
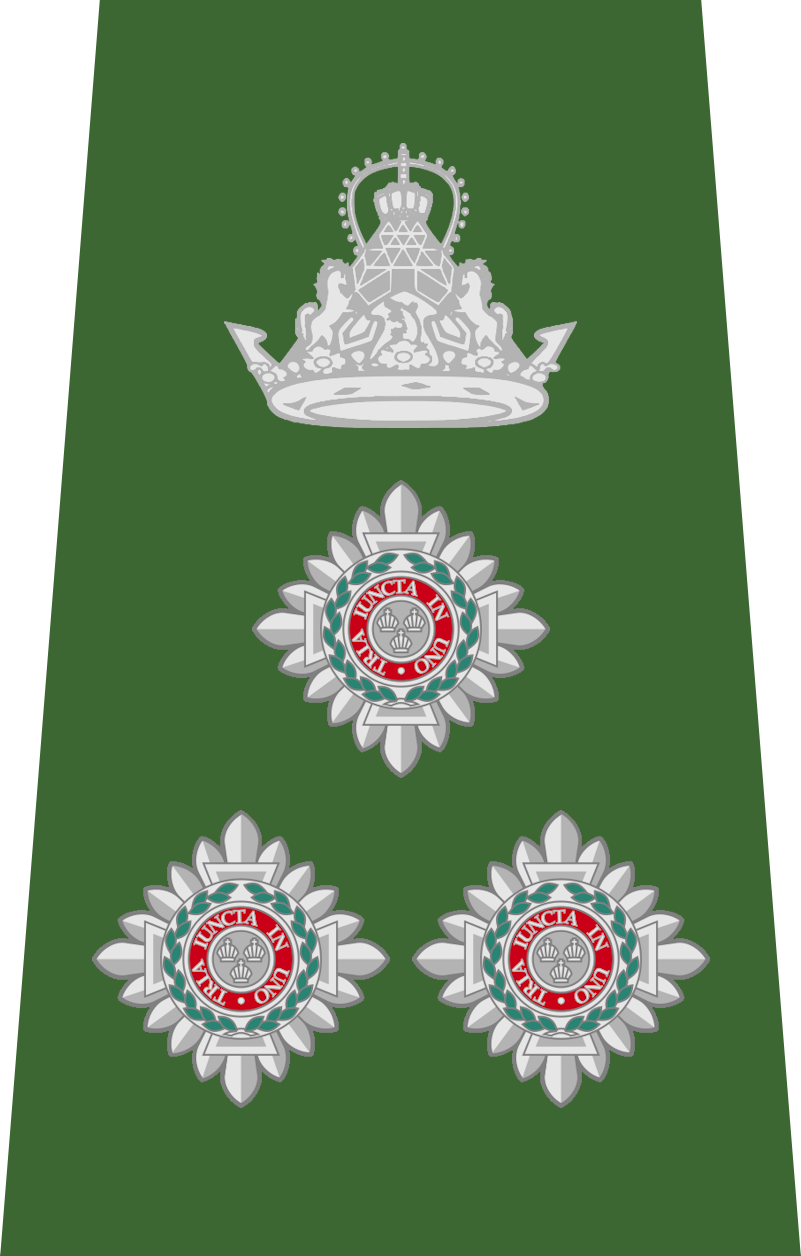
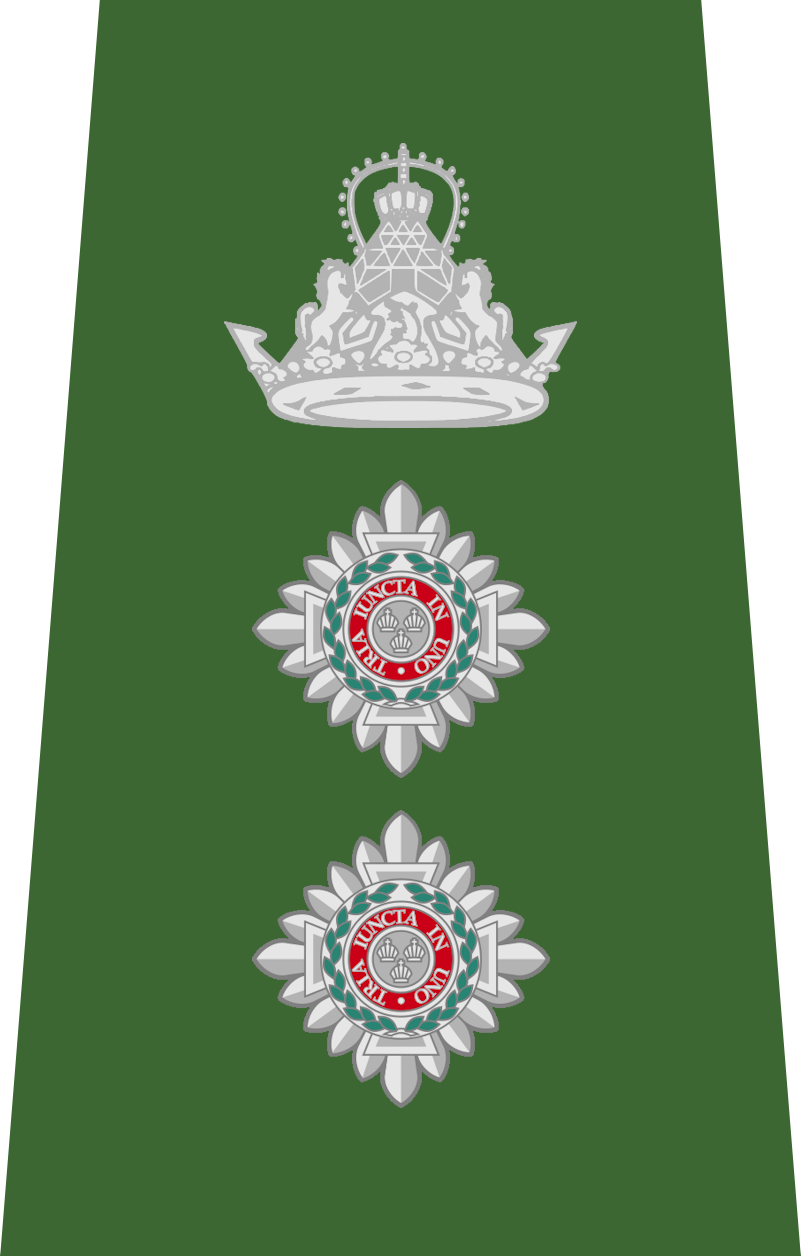
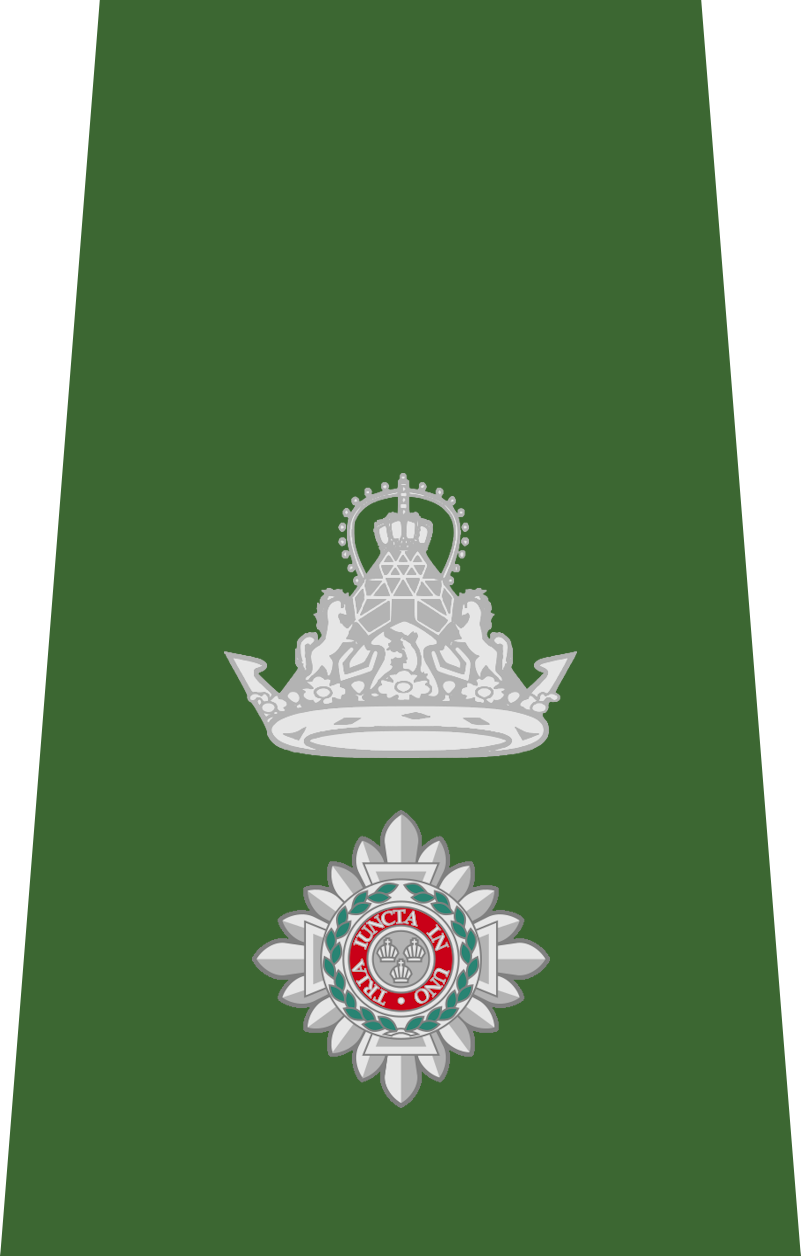
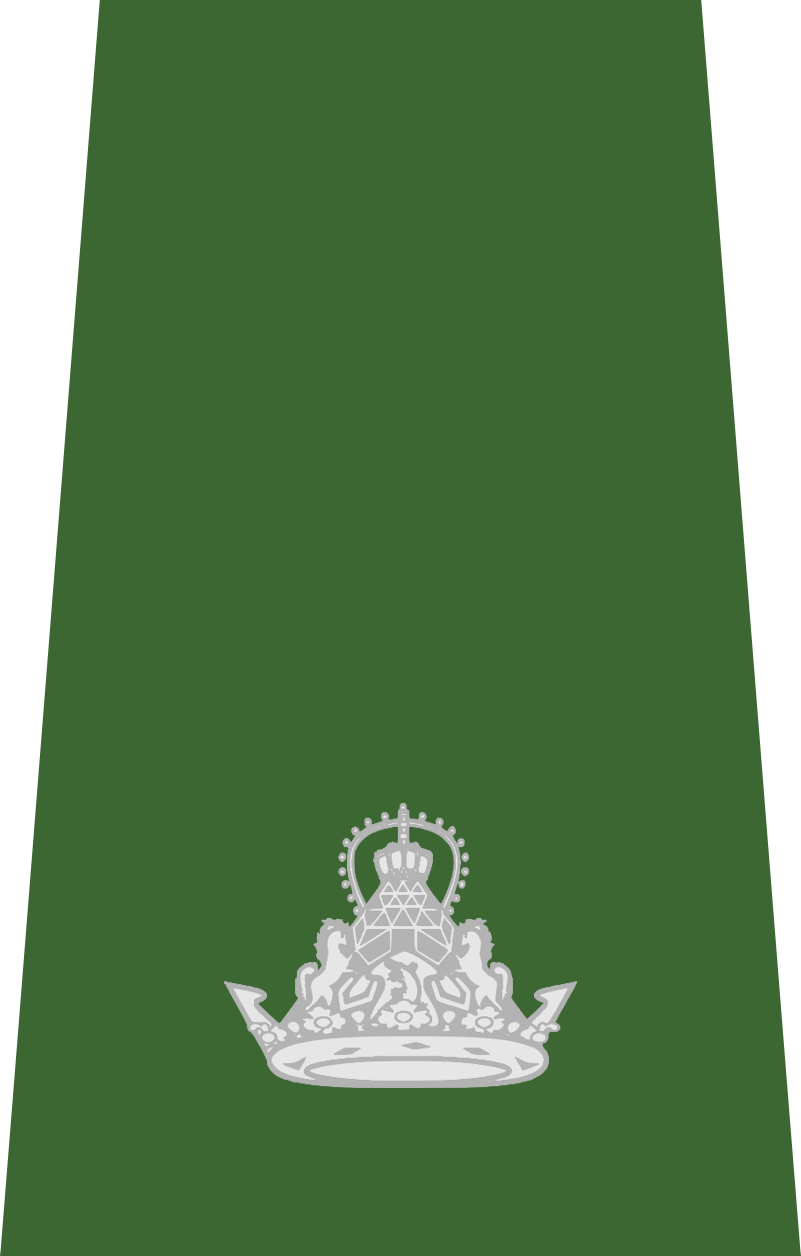
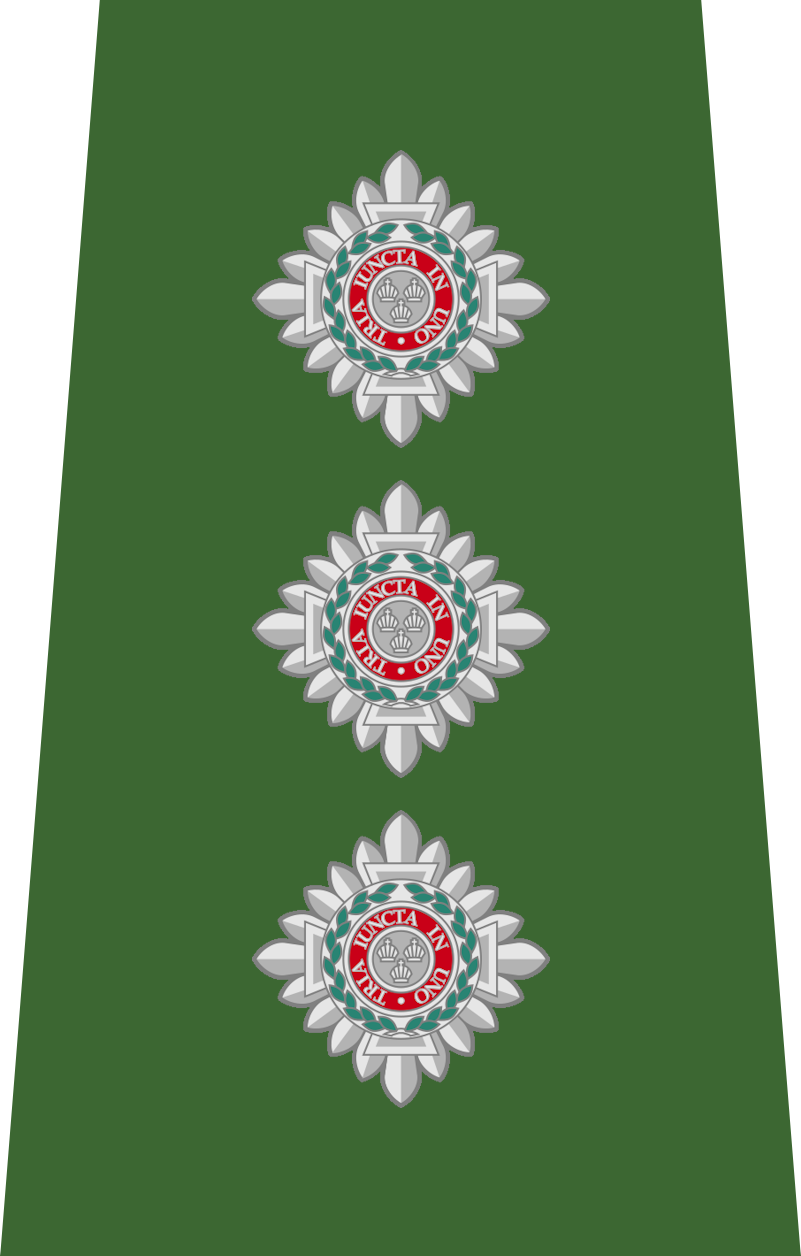
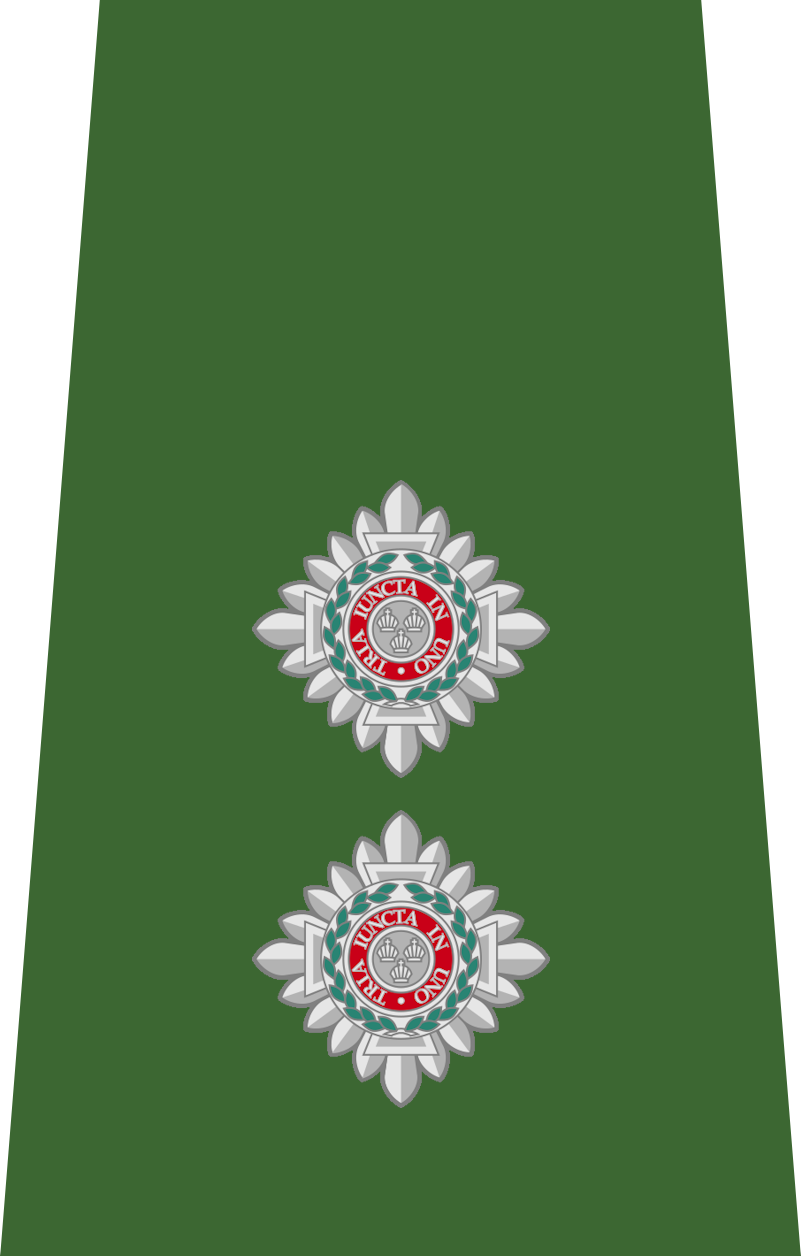
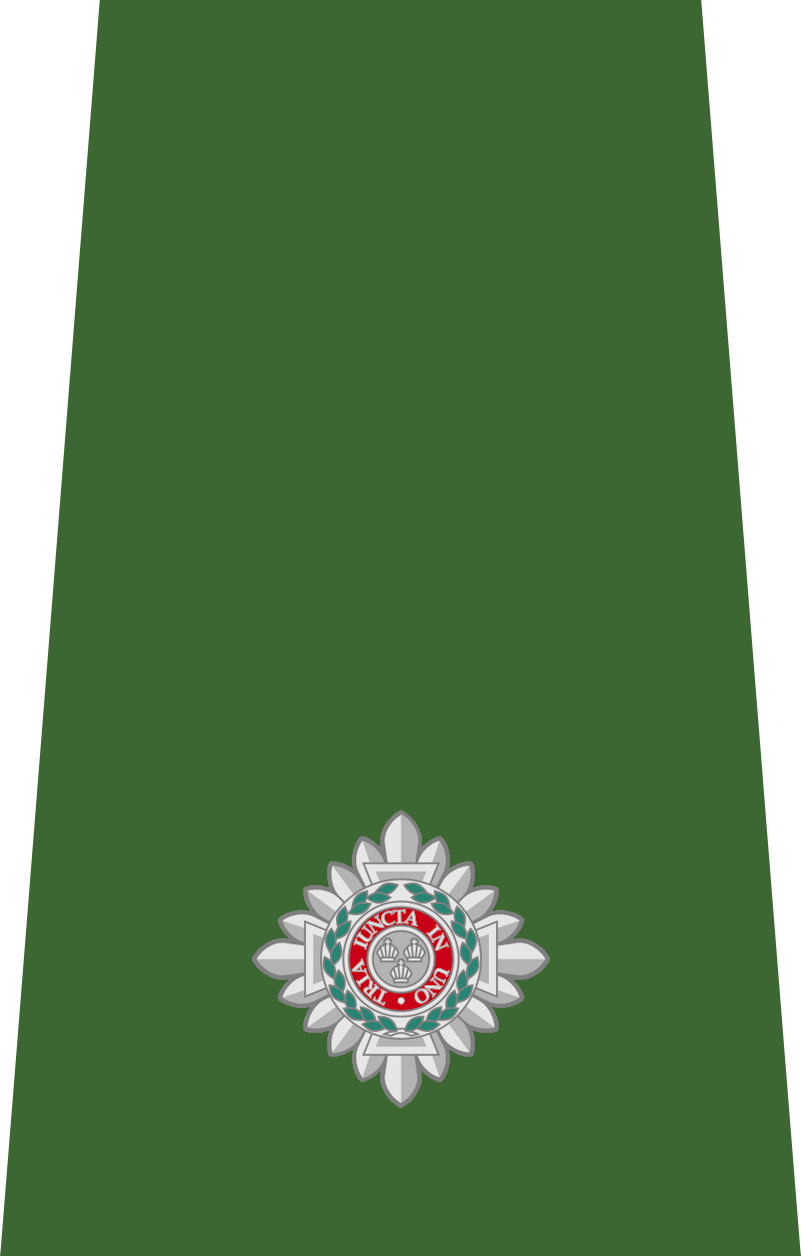
Rank group	General / flag officers				Senior officers			Junior officers
Lesotho Army (Unknown–2025)
Lesotho Army (Unknown–2025)	Field marshal	Lieutenant general	Major general	Brigadier	Colonel	Lieutenant colonel	Major	Captain	Lieutenant	Second lieutenant
