= Johnson Mlambo =

South African politician (1940–2021)

Johnson Phillip Mlambo

Personal details
- Born: 22 February 1940
- Died: 9 January 2021 (aged 80)
- Party: Pan Africanist Congress (1959–2021)
- Occupation: Politician; Anti-apartheid activist

Johnson Phillip Mlambo (22 February 1940 – 9 January 2021) was a South African politician from Johannesburg.

== Activism and political career ==
He joined the Pan Africanist Congress (PAC) at its foundation in 1959, becoming branch leader in Daveyton. In 1962, two years after its banning, he went to the underground headquarters in Maseru, where he was part of the preparations for the so-called "Year of Destiny" being planned in 1963.

He was arrested on 31 March 1963, along with seven colleagues, sentenced to twenty years in prison, and transferred to Robben Island. On the island, he suffered abuse from prison warders, including being buried alive to his neck, and urinated on. This and other forms of ill-treatment were exposed to the international community, came before the United Nations General Assembly, and led to some improvements in conditions.

After his release on 20 June 1983, he rejoined the PAC, and spent about ten days with his family before leaving the country to join the PAC in exile. He was appointed Secretary for Foreign Affairs and, after the death of John Nyathi Pokela, was appointed chairman and commander in chief of the Azanian People's Liberation Army (APLA), the PAC's military wing, from 12 August 1985 until 1990. He served as Deputy President of the PAC from 1990 to 1994.

== Personal life and death ==
He was the uncle of Judge Dunstan Mlambo.

He died of COVID-19 during the COVID-19 pandemic in South Africa, on the morning of 9 January 2021, after being admitted to hospital the day before.
