= John Nyathi Pokela =

South African political activist

Chairman of the Pan Africanist Congress
- In office February 1981 – June 1985
- Preceded by: Vusumzi Make
- Succeeded by: Johnson Mlambo

Personal details
- Born: 1922 or 1923 Herschel, Transkei, South Africa
- Died: 30 June 1985 Parirenyatwa Hospital, Zimbabwe
- Party: Pan Africanist Congress

John Nyathi "Poks" Pokela (1922 or 1923 – 30 June 1985) was a South African political activist and Chairman of the Pan Africanist Congress (PAC).

== Early life ==
Born in Herschel in the Transkei region, he was educated at Healdtown Comprehensive School and the University of Fort Hare. Graduating as a teacher he would teach in Standerton. Originally a member of the African National Congress Youth League where he was a member of the Africanist wing which rejected contact with other racial groups in the ANC. He left the African National Congress in November 1958 and helped found the PAC in the late 1950s becoming its Acting Secretary-general. He would leave South Africa in 1963, leading the organisation in exile from Lesotho.

== Incarceration on Robben Island ==
In 1966, he was sentenced to 13 years in prison on Robben Island on charges of sabotage related to the Azanian People's Liberation Army (APLA), the militant wing of the Pan Africanist Congress; he had helped found the APLA (originally known as Poqo) in 1961, along Z. B. Molete and Clarence Makwetu.

While incarcerated, Pokela worked towards uniting the various factions of the PAC. In 1980, having served his sentence, Pokela was released from Robben Island. In February 1981, he was appointed to succeed Vusumzi Make, (who had resigned after the Chunya massacre in March 1980 when APLA troops refused to accept his leadership), to become head of the Tanzanian backed faction of the PAC. His leadership was rejected by the survivors of the 500 strong APLA Chunya force as well as the Maoist PAC factions in Zimbabwe, Libya, Ghana, and Kenya but Tanzania persuaded the Mugabe government to deport or imprison the major opponents (Leballo, Leeman, Gaelisiwe, Buqwana).

== Chairmanship of the Pan Africanist Congress ==
=== Attempts at intra-party reconciliation ===
Once he assumed the position of chairman, Pokela set to work reuniting the PAC, which had been fractured since the 1979 Tanzanian-backed deposition of Chairman Potlako Leballo, leader of the party from 1962 to 1979. He held talks with the 70 member Azanian People's Revolutionary Party (APRP), a short-lived offshoot of the PAC formed by members expelled by 1978 PAC National Executive meeting in Arusha. Because of this reconciliation effort, they rejoined in 1982 and the APRP disbanded.

=== Support for Iraq ===
During the Iran–Iraq War, Pokela visited Baghdad, Iraq with a PAC delegation, and stated his support for Iraq. However, this was contrary to the position of the PAC, which was to not pick sides in a conflict between members of the Non-Aligned Movement, and Pokela was criticized for this action by other members of the party, including Henry Isaacs and Mike Muendane. Iraq later sent 50,000 dollars to the PAC.

=== Reorganization of the party ===
Pokela also attempted the reorganization of the party itself, which was suffering from both differences between various Central Committee members and differences between the leaders and the party members. He appointed outgoing Chairman Make to the position of Deputy Chairman, even though Make was being investigated for misuse of funds at the time, and increased the power of the chairman. Pokela also encountered more opposition from Isaacs about his organizational changes (Isaacs eventually resigned.)

Under Pokela, the use of funds was set, with 50% set aside for military operations, 30% going to administration, and 20% used for propaganda; the idea of members submitting annual financial reports about their use of PAC funds was also floated. Nevertheless, money went missing at various points in time, and the PAC ran out of funds between March and November 1981.

== Death ==
Pokela died in Parirenyatwa Hospital in Zimbabwe in June 1985. He was buried in a state funeral in Zimbabwe officiated by Stanley Mogoba, a Methodist bishop, and was praised by Zimbabwean president Robert Mugabe for reuniting the PAC. Pokela was succeeded as chairman by Johnson Mlambo.

== Literature written by Pokela ==
- "Segregatory Bodies Must Go." Inkundla, 24 December 1949.
- "The Birth-Pangs of African Unity in the Sub-Continent" Manuscript, possibly written in 1962.

== See also ==
- Pan Africanist Congress
- Azanian People's Liberation Army

Political offices
Preceded by Vusumzi Make	Chairman of the Pan Africanist Congress; February 1981 – June 1985	Succeeded by Johnson Mlambo
