= Elias Phisoana Ramaema =

Military ruler of Lesotho from 1991 to 1993 (1933–2015)

General Elias Phisoana Ramaema

2nd Chairman of the Military Council
- In office 2 May 1991 – 2 April 1993
- Monarch: Letsie III
- Preceded by: Justin Lekhanya
- Succeeded by: Ntsu Mokhehle (As Prime Minister of Lesotho)

Personal details
- Born: Elias Phisoana Ramaema; 10 November 1933 Mapoteng, Basutoland (now Mapoteng, Lesotho)
- Died: 11 December 2015 (aged 82) Maseru, Lesotho
- Party: None (military officer)
- Occupation: Soldier

Military service
- Branch/service: Lesotho Defence Force
- Rank: Major-General

Major-General Elias Phisoana Ramaema (10 November 1933 – 11 December 2015) was Chairman of the Military Council and Council of Ministers of Lesotho (head of government) from 2 May 1991 to 2 April 1993.

Born at Mapoteng, Berea District, Ramaema completed his high school education at Roma College in 1956. He worked as a migrant laborer at the President Steyn gold mine in Welkom between 1957 and 1958. After failing to secure employment he returned home and joined the Basutoland Mounted Police the following year. After the country's independence, he was transferred to the newly formed paramilitary Police Mobile Unit, which later became Lesotho Defence Force. He was promoted to the rank of lieutenant colonel and received specialized training in South Africa. As one of the six members of the Military Council, he oversaw the Ministries of Planning, Finance, Public Service, and Labour and Manpower Development. Government sources also described him as a mediator in conflicts between the Military Council and King Moshoeshoe II and General Justin Lekhanya's right-hand man.

His greatest accomplishment was overseeing Lesotho's transformation back to civilian rule, which he revoked the Order No. 4, the Suspension of Political Activities Order and dropped the draft constitution clause that would have enshrined a military presence in the cabinet. He also presided over constitutional negotiations and permitted parliamentary elections that resulted in his peaceful transition of power to the newly democratically elected government of Ntsu Mokhehle.

After stepping down as prime minister, he retired from the military and engaged in private and public ventures which included serving in parliamentary committees as well as the special advisory to the High Court of Lesotho. He died in 2015 at the age of 82.

Political offices
| Preceded by Justin Lekhanya | Chairman of the Military Council; 1991–1993 | Succeeded by Ntsu Mokhehle as Prime Minister of Lesotho |
