= Yakar =

Yakar is a surname and it may refer to:

== People with the surname ==
- Noa Kazado Yakar (born 2003), Israeli acrobatic gymnast.
- Rachel Yakar (1938– 2023), French soprano
- Yaakov ben Yakar (990–1064), German Talmudist.
- Judah ben Yakar (born 1201-1218?), talmudist and kabbalist.

== Other ==
- Yakar Synagogue, Old Katamon neighborhood of Jerusalem, including the Yakar Center for Social Concern and the Center for Arts and Creativity: an Anglo and Israeli congregation.
