= Lesotho Mounted Police Service =

National police force of Lesotho

- Active: 18 October 1872
- Country: Lesotho
- Headquarters: Maseru, Lesotho
- Motto: Lepolesa Mothusi Motsoalle; Police A Helper A Friend
- Abbreviation: LMPS

Commanders
- Current commander: Advocate Borotho Matsoso (24 May 2024)

Website
- lmps.org.ls

The Lesotho Mounted Police Service (LMPS) is the national police force of the Southern African Kingdom of Lesotho. Advocate Borotho Matsoso is the current Commissioner of LMPS since 24 May 2024 after being sworn in by Prime Minister Sam Matekane.

== History ==
The police service was established in 1872, with an initial strength of 110 men. It adopted military discipline and, from 1878, military rank structure based on the British army. In the 1950s the force moved towards a civilian police operation, and in 1958 replaced its military rank structure with conventional civilian police ranks. Originally known as the Basutoland Mounted Police, the force later changed its name to Lesotho Police, then Lesotho Mounted Police (1966), and Royal Lesotho Mounted Force (1986). Today, in common with many police forces, it has adopted the style "police service" in its current formal name of Lesotho Mounted Police Service.

=== Ranks ===
Rank and Insignia
Basutoland Mounted Police 1878–1958	Rank	Major General	Brigadier	Colonel	Lieutenant Colonel	Major	Captain	Lieutenant	Second; Lieutenant	Warrant; Officer	Staff; Sergeant	Sergeant	Lance; Sergeant	Private
Basutoland Mounted Police 1878–1958	Insignia													
Basutoland Mounted Police 1958–1966	Rank	Commissioner	Deputy Commissioner	Assistant Commissioner	Senior Superintendent	Superintendent	Senior Inspector	Inspector		Sergeant			Constable	
Basutoland Mounted Police 1958–1966	Insignia													
Lesotho Mounted Police 1966–1986	Rank	Commissioner	Deputy Commissioner	Assistant Commissioner	Senior Superintendent	Superintendent	Senior Inspector	Inspector		Sergeant			Constable	
Lesotho Mounted Police 1966–1986	Insignia													
Royal Lesotho Mounted Police 1986–1998	Rank	Commissioner	Deputy Commissioner	Assistant Commissioner	Senior Superintendent	Superintendent	Senior Inspector	Inspector		Sergeant			Constable	
Royal Lesotho Mounted Police 1986–1998	Insignia													
Lesotho Mounted Police Service 1998–present	Rank	Commissioner	Deputy Commissioner	Assistant Commissioner	Senior Superintendent	Superintendent	Senior Inspector	Inspector		Sergeant			Constable	
Lesotho Mounted Police Service 1998–present	Insignia													

== Commissioners ==
- C. H. Aprthorp (1947–1949)
- L. W. Clarke (1949–1952)
- F. J. Roach (1970–1972)
- A. Namoli (1972–1973)
- B. A. Ntoi (1973–1977)
- R. S. Matela (1977–1986)
- L. Dingizwayo (1986–1991)
- T. T. Phinda (1991–1996)
- V. B. Makoaba (1996–1998)
- E. K. Petlane (1999–2000)
- Jonas Malewa (2000–2005)
- 'Malejaka Letooane (2005–2012) First woman to hold the office
- Kizito Mhlakaza (2012–2014)
- Khothatso Ts'ooana (2014–2015) Youngest to hold the office, aged 36
- Molahlei Letsoepa (2015–2017)
- Holomo Molibeli (2017–2024)
- Dr. Mahlape Morai (February 2024–24 May 2024) Acting Commissioner
- Adv. Borotho Matsoso (24 May 2024–present)

=== Deputy commissioners ===
- Mahlape Morai
- Paseka Mokete
- Moqhebi Likhama
- Sera Cedric Makharilele
- Beleme Lebajoa

== Training ==
The national Police Training College (P.T.C) opened in 1946. All recruits are enrolled as Cadets and complete a thirteen-month training course. Recruits must be aged between 18 and 30, and pass an initial entrance examination. Recruits are accepted from all parts of Lesotho society, but must be registered as Lesotho citizens. Although police positions were originally restricted to men only, the force has admitted women officers since 1970.

== See also ==
- Lesotho Defence Force
