= David Sibeko =

South African political activist (1938–1979)

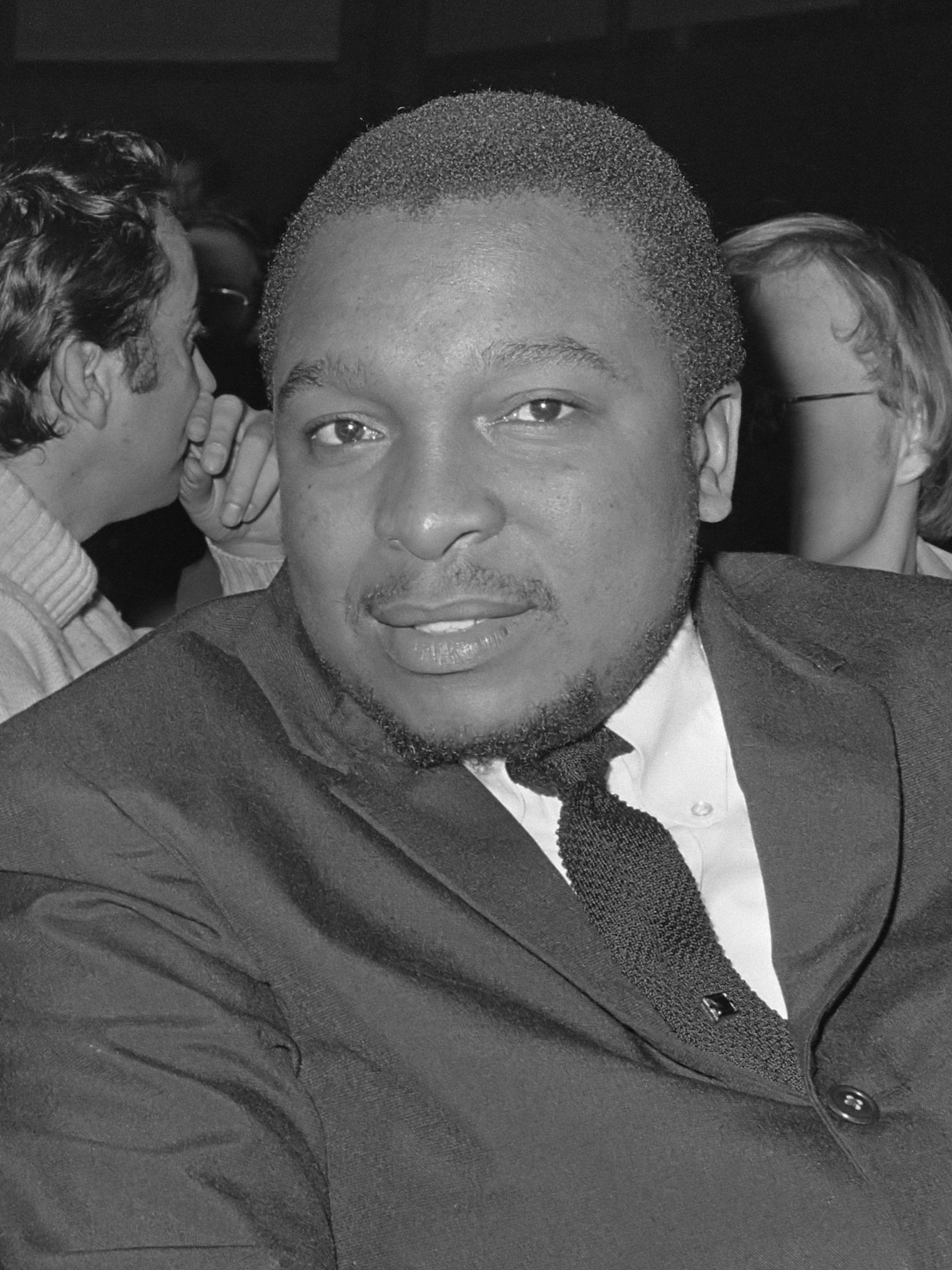
David Sibeko (1969)

David Bambatha Maphangumzana Sibeko (26 August 1938 in Johannesburg, South Africa – 12 June 1979 in Dar es Salaam, Tanzania) was a South African political activist. Known as the "Malcolm X of South Africa", he began his political career as a journalist for the black South African magazine Drum. During his tenure with that magazine, he became a leading figure within the Pan Africanist Congress of Azania (South Africa). During the 1970s he headed the United Nations Observer Mission of the Pan Africanist Congress (PAC) in New York City and used this position to popularize the PAC, particularly among African Americans. In 1979 Sibeko was partially successful in a leadership coup against Potlako Leballo. However, he failed to get support from the Second Azanian People's Liberation Army, recruited from the 1976 student protest generation, and was shot dead during an argument with them at his flat in Oyster Bay in Dar es Salaam, Tanzania on 12 June 1979.

== Early career and journalism ==
David Sibeko was born on 26 August 1938 in Sophiatown, Johannesburg. He studied at St Cyprian's Anglican School and thereafter attended Johannesburg Bantu High School. After completing his school education, he worked with Drum magazine and became an insurance agent in 1958. In 1960, he rejoined Drum magazine as a columnist and also reported for the Golden City Post.

In 1960, Sibeko became a member of the Pan Africanist Congress (PAC), after the organization was banned and the country went into a state of emergency. He was detained in 1963 under the Sabotage Act but was later acquitted. After leaving South Africa, he joined the PAC in exile in Tanzania. Eventually, the PAC sent him to the People's Republic of China, where he trained in journalism and later became the PAC's chief representative in East Africa.

His early work in journalism was also connected to his later political work. He worked as an organizer with the PAC while also having experience presenting political issues to people outside South Africa.

== Exile and diplomatic work ==
During his exile, Sibeko became involved in the PAC's international activities. He served as the organization's contact with the Freedom Committee of the Organisation of African Unity. In 1968, he was appointed head of the PAC's mission to Europe and the Americas, and according to South African History Online, he helped establish PAC offices in several countries. In 1974, he became the PAC's permanent observer at the United Nations.

His work was not limited to the United Nations. Historian Carolyn A. Brown describes Sibeko as a PAC representative at the United Nations who also frequently spoke at political rallies in Harlem. Brown places him within a larger network connecting African political movements with African-American political organizations.

Sibeko also participated directly in discussions at the United Nations concerning South Africa. A 1977 Washington Post report identified him as the representative of the Pan Africanist Congress during a Security Council debate on South Africa. In March 1979, representatives of Gabon, Nigeria, and Zambia asked the president of the Security Council to invite Sibeko to meetings concerning Angola's complaint against South Africa.

In 1975, Sibeko became a member of the PAC's central committee and its director of foreign affairs. He also continued speaking to anti-apartheid organizations and political audiences outside South Africa. His international work therefore included diplomatic representation, public speaking, and organizational activities outside South Africa.

== Death and aftermath ==
In 1979, Sibeko became involved in the internal conflict over the leadership of the PAC following the removal of Potlako Leballo. He became a member of the organization's three-person President's Council. Later that year, Sibeko was shot in Dar es Salaam, Tanzania, by members of the PAC and died in June 1979.

There are some differences between the sources concerning the exact circumstances of his death. South African History Online's biography gives 12 June as the date of his death, while its PAC chronology gives 1 June as the date of the shooting and provides additional details about the alleged gunman. In June 1981, a Tanzanian court sentenced six PAC members to 15 years in prison for Sibeko's killing.

== See also ==
- Apartheid
- Sharpeville Massacre
- Black Consciousness Movement
- Pan Africanism
