= Potlako Leballo =

Mosotho revolutionary (1924–1986)

Potlako Kitchener Leballo (19 December 1924 – January 1986) was a Lesotho Africanist who led the Pan Africanist Congress until 1979. Leballo was co-founder of the Basutoland African Congress in 1952, a World War II veteran and primary school headmaster.

== Early years ==
Leballo was born in Lifelekoaneng, Mafeteng, Lesotho (then called Basutoland) in 1915, the youngest of fourteen children, but claimed he had been born in 1925. His absentee father was a catechist in the Anglican Church who taught at St. Paul's Mission in Tsikoane and he was reared by two of his father's elder brothers. One of these, Motsoasele, was a fervent nationalist and retained his traditional religion until his death in 1947. The other uncle, Nathaniel, was an Anglican pastor and Potlako received a Christian education, first at St. Saviour's in Hlotse and later at Masite Institution in Morija. While at St. Saviour's, he was abducted by Uncle Motsoasele who took him to receive his traditional Sesotho initiation known as lebollo. Lebollo was contrary to St. Saviour's rules and, as a result, he was expelled.

== Move to South Africa ==
In 1940, Leballo became a student at Lovedale College, near Alice, Eastern Cape, South Africa.

He was active in the African National Congress Youth League until he and other radical leaders including Robert Sobukwe were expelled from the ANC and went on to form the PAC, a more radical Africanist movement. He held the distinction of having successfully nominated Chief Albert Lutuli (1952) and Mangaliso Robert Sobukwe (1959) to the leadership of the African National Congress (ANC) and Pan Africanist Congress (PAC) respectively. He stated later (1984) that he believed that leaving the ANC (although encouraged by Kwame Nkrumah and the Basuto leader Ntsu Mokhehle) was a mistake and that his "Africanists" should have fought for control of the party rather than forming a new one. He was elected Secretary General of the PAC and within a year the new party was seriously challenging the ANC.

== Pan Africanist Congress of Azania ==
After the anti-pass campaign and the Sharpeville massacre when PAC supporters were shot by police in 1960, Leballo was sentenced to prison for incitement, and on his release in 1962 was deported to Basutoland (now Lesotho), where he helped re-establish the PAC. His leadership included the formation of Poqo, the military wing of the PAC, later to become the Azanian People's Liberation Army (APLA). The 1962–1964 Poqo uprising failed partly because the shipment of arms to the Transkei coast from Ghana and Egypt vanished, reportedly sold by corrupt PAC officials, but mostly because of Leballo's expulsion from Basutoland (his own country) following South African government pressure. Leballo set up PAC headquarters in Ghana and Tanzania. He was responsible for a major ideological shift towards Maoism but until 1976 was unable to get majority backing from external refugees, many of whom lost their zeal for militant activities while still demanding a major role in party affairs. A successful demagogue in the rural areas and townships, Leballo was not suited to the diplomatic circuit required of exiles. The majority of the so-called "reformist-diplomat" section of the external PAC repeatedly challenged the PAC leadership, but were then themselves challenged by the arrival in exile in 1974 of 178 troops of the refugee Basutoland Congress Party, who began training as PAC APLA guerrillas in Libya. The reformist-diplomats were once again challenged by 500 Soweto and Cape students who joined the Basotho in Libya.

== Chairman of the PAC ==
In 1978 the PAC leader Sobukwe died in restriction in Kimberley and Leballo was elected Chairman of the PAC. His position was tenuous. Nkrumah was long gone and Mao Zedong died in 1976. The PAC had been forced to consider extremely unsavory allies such as Pol Pot, Saddam Hussein and Idi Amin. The main threat however came from the US Carter administration that had resolved it needed South Africa as a stable element in the equation to settle the Zimbabwe issue. The ANC and PAC were urged to abandon guerrilla war and embrace détente and dialogue. Andrew Young, the American ambassador to the UN, and the Nigerians reportedly donated hundreds of thousands of dollars to David Sibeko, the PAC representative at the UN, to dilute Leballo's revolutionary ideology by getting his own supporters elected to the new PAC executive. Sibeko was largely successful (hence Leballo's title of "Chairman" rather than "President") but neglected the newly recruited Azanian People's Army (APLA), already victorious over the older APLA of Templeton Ntantala and demanding a greater share in finances. In 1979 Leballo left for medical treatment in England and a triumvirate of Sibeko, Vusi Make, and Elias Ntloedibe announced they were the new PAC leadership following Leballo's "resignation." APLA commanders arrived in Dar es Salaam from Itumbi Camp, Chunya near Mbeya, and quarreled with Sibeko. The same evening they shot him dead. Vusi Make was then declared the new PAC leader but APLA rejected him. In the ensuing standoff at Chunya, Tanzanian troops killed four unarmed APLA soldiers, wounded forty, and dispersed the survivors. Forty of the APLA soldiers who were deemed dangerous by the PAC leadership were sent to a detention camp in Mgagau, Iringa. In 1980 Leballo arrived in Zimbabwe and established a new PAC headquarters. He had no funds and was financially supported by a white APLA intelligence officer. Although he was welcomed by Edgar Tekere, the ZANU (PF) Secretary General and other party and military leaders, others including Prime Minister Robert Mugabe, pointedly kept their distance. Leballo's intelligence officer advised him to bolster links with North Korea, whose ambassador was enthusiastic and had even financed household purchases for Leballo, because the officer felt that however Pan-Africanist the party was, it simply couldn't trust African governments and it was advisable to find a secure base in North Korea. Leballo declined, saying the party had to rely on Africa, however treacherous politicians were. He was encouraged by the Libyan government's promise to finance an exiled University of Azania in Zimbabwe.

== Deportation ==
In February 1981 John Nyati Pokela, a senior PAC member, was released from detention in South Africa and replaced Make as the leader of the "reformist-diplomat" PAC. Leballo wrote to him suggesting a meeting, stating in private that he would accept Pokela as PAC President/Chairman if he (Leballo) could command APLA. Pokela never replied. They both attended the first anniversary celebrations of independence at Rufaro Stadium but merely waved to each other at a distance. Tanzanian sympathizers at the Tanzanian High Commission warned Leballo that the Tanzanian president, Julius Nyerere, and the Tanzanian secretary general of the OAU Liberation Committee, Hashim Mbita, had both demanded Leballo's expulsion from Zimbabwe. The next day Leballo was arrested while waiting to meet Edson Zvobgo, a government minister, imprisoned, and deported the next day. Handed a few dollars by his intelligence officer as he was rushed onto a plane, Leballo eventually arrived in Libya after being shunted around the Middle East and losing all his luggage.

== Later years ==
From 1981 until his death in 1986 Leballo worked in Ghana with President Jerry Rawlings' People's Committees but was mostly penniless in London. His Ugandan and Tanzanian diplomatic passports were revoked but he used his Liberian passport to build up links with the Rwandan Tutsi and Museveni's Ugandan resistance movements. After Pokela's sudden death in 1985 Leballo began to have success reuniting the PAC but died suddenly in January 1986 in Greenwich, London. He was buried in Lifelekoaneng, Lesotho. The Basutoland Congress Party, which he had co-founded and whose military wing he had trained, acknowledged that Leballo had played a major part in bringing down the regime of Leabua Jonathan Molapo in 1986.

== Summary ==
Although largely forgotten in South African politics, Leballo was responsible for temporarily turning the PAC away in the years 1966–1979 from semi-fascism towards Maoism. He recognized the futility of the Poqo slogan "drive the whites into the sea" (later revived by the remnant PAC as "one settler one bullet" with disastrous electoral consequences – 1.2% of the vote in 1994 and 0.7% thereafter). Sibeko's grab for power in 1979, the Chunya massacre, and Leballo's peripheralization were not just the termination of one man's career but the death of a credible left wing alternative to the ANC/SACP alliance.

Preceded by Robert Sobukwe	Chairman of the Pan Africanist Congress; 1962-1979	Succeeded by David Sibeko, Ellias Ntloedibe, and Vusumzi Make
