= Lesotho Defence Force =

Military of Lesotho

- Lesotho Defence Force insignia
- Motto: Ts'epo ea Sechaba (Hope of the nation)
- Founded: 1978
- Service branches: Army; Air wing
- Headquarters: Maseru
- Website: www.ldf.gov.ls

Leadership
- Monarch: King Letsie III
- Prime Minister: Sam Matekane
- Minister of Defence and National Security: Sam Matekane
- Commander of the Defence Force: Lieutenant General Mojalefa Letsoela

Personnel
- Active personnel: 2,000 personnel

Related articles
- Ranks: Military ranks of Lesotho

The Lesotho Defence Force (LDF) is the military of the Southern African Kingdom of Lesotho, which consists of about 2,000 personnel and is tasked with maintaining internal security, territorial integrity, and defending the constitution of Lesotho. Since the mountainous kingdom is completely landlocked by South Africa, in practice the country's external defence is guaranteed by its larger neighbour, so the armed forces are mainly used for internal security. The LDF is an army with a small air wing.

== History ==
The military was established in 1978. The Lesotho Defence Force participated in the military coup in 1986, internal conflicts in 1994 and 1998, and unrest in 2007.

Following the 1993 Lesotho general election, in August 1994, King Letsie III dissolved the newly elected parliament in a coup d'état that was supported by the military.

On 30 August 2014, an alleged military coup took place, forcing then-Prime Minister Tom Thabane to flee to South Africa for three days. A brief crisis occurred in September 2017 when Lieutenant General Khoantle Motsomotso (then-commander of the LDF) was assassinated by some junior officers, leading to an intervention by the Southern African Development Community (SADC).

In 2021, a LDF contingent was sent to Mozambique as part of the Southern African Development Community Mission in Mozambique (SAMIM) to assist the Mozambican government during the insurgency in Cabo Delgado. The contingent consequently took part in pro-government offensives from August 2021.

== Army ==
The army of Lesotho began in the 1960s initially as a paramilitary police force, established separately from the Lesotho Mounted Police Service on 1 April 1978. It was recognised as an army in August 1979 and was expanded in the 1980s in response to Basutoland Congress Party insurgent activities. After the January 1986 military coup that brought General Justin Lekhanya to power, the army was renamed the Royal Lesotho Defence Force. As of 1990, it was estimated to have about 2,000 personnel divided into one recon company, one artillery battery, seven infantry companies, one special forces platoon, and a support company.

== Equipment ==
=== Small arms ===
| Name | Image | Caliber | Type | Origin | Notes |
Submachine guns
| Sterling | | 9×19mm | Submachine gun | United Kingdom | |
| Uzi | | 9×19mm | Submachine gun | Israel | |
Rifles
| AKM | | 7.62×39mm | Assault rifle | Soviet Union | |
| AK-74 | | 5.45×39mm | Assault rifle | Soviet Union | |
| Type 56 | | 7.62×39mm | Assault rifle | China | |
| IMI Galil | | 5.56×45mm | Assault rifle | Israel | |
| Vektor R4 | | 5.56×45mm | Assault rifle | South Africa | |
| M16 | | 5.56×45mm | Assault rifle | United States | |
| Beretta AR70/90 | | 5.56×45mm | Assault rifle | Italy | |
| FN FAL | | 7.62×51mm | Battle rifle | Belgium | |
| Lee-Enfield | | .303 British | Bolt-action rifle | British Empire | |
Sniper rifles
| SVD | | 7.62×54mmR | Designated marksman rifle Sniper rifle | Soviet Union | |
Machine guns
| Bren | | 7.62×51mm | Light machine gun | United Kingdom | |
| RPD | | 7.62×39mm | Squad automatic weapon | Soviet Union | |
| RPK | | 7.62×39mm | Squad automatic weapon | Soviet Union | |
| FN MAG | | 7.62×51mm | General-purpose machine gun | Belgium | |
| Browning M2 | | .50 BMG | Heavy machine gun | United States | |
Rocket propelled grenade launchers
| RPG-7 | | 40mm | Rocket-propelled grenade | Soviet Union | |

=== Anti-tank weapons ===
| Name | Image | Type | Origin | Caliber | Notes |
|---|---|---|---|---|---|
| M40A1 | | Recoilless rifle | United States | 106mm | 6 in service. |

=== Tanks ===
| Name | Image | Type | Origin | Quantity | Status | Notes |
|---|---|---|---|---|---|---|
| T-55 | | Medium tank | Soviet Union | 1 | | |

=== Scout cars ===
| Name | Image | Type | Origin | Quantity | Status | Notes |
|---|---|---|---|---|---|---|
| BRDM-2 | | Amphibious armored scout car | Soviet Union | 2 | | |

=== Reconnaissance ===
| Name | Image | Type | Origin | Quantity | Status | Notes |
|---|---|---|---|---|---|---|
| Panhard AML | | Armored car | France | 6 | | |
| RAM MK3 | | Armored Car | Israel | 6 | | |
| RBY Mk 1 | | Armored Car | Israel | 10 | | |
| Shorland S52 | | Armored car | United Kingdom | 8 | | |

== Air Wing ==
LDF Guard of Honor

The Lesotho Defence Force Air Wing was originally a 1978-offshoot of the paramilitary police mobile unit and began operations with two Short Skyvan twin turboprop STOL transports, a leased Cessna A152 Aerobat, two MBB Bo 105 helicopters, and a Bell 47G helicopter converted to turboshaft power. Two Mil Mi-2 twin-turbine helicopters were donated by Libya in 1983 but were retired by 1986.

Deliveries of four Bell 412 helicopters were delayed in 1983 to 1986 because of South Africa's influence. This changed when a 1986 military coup resulted in new security agreements with South Africa being signed. In the mid-1980s the air wing was merged into the Lesotho Defence Force. In 1989, the Skyvans were replaced by two CASA C-212 Aviocar light turboprop transports; one immediately crashed, requiring a third to be delivered in 1992. A fifth Bell 412 (an EP model) was delivered in May 1998 to replace the one written off the previous January.

=== Aircraft ===
Lesotho Defence Force roundel

| Aircraft | Origin | Type | Variant | In service | Notes |
Transport
| CASA C-212 | Spain | Transport | | 2 | |
| GippsAero GA8 | Australia | Utility | | 1 | |
Helicopters
| Bell 412 | United States | Utility | | 3 | |
| Eurocopter AS350 | France | Light utility | | 3 | |

=== Accidents and incidents ===
13 April 2017, a Eurocopter EC135 T2+ crashed in the area of Thaba Putsoa, killing all four people on board. The helicopter was carrying three soldiers and an official from the Ministry of Finance who was delivering pensions to outlying districts. Officials reported it hit power lines and crashed in mountainous terrain near Thaba Putsoa, killing two of the soldiers and critically injuring the other two passengers, both of whom later died in hospital from their injuries.

== See also ==
- Commander of the Lesotho Defence Force
