= 2010s in Africa =

Events from the decade 2010s in Africa.

== International events in Africa ==
The Arab Winter (Arabic: الشتاء العربي, romanized: ash-shitāʼ al-ʻarabī) is the resurgence of authoritarianism and Islamic extremism in some Arab countries in the 2010s in the aftermath of the Arab Spring. The term "Arab Winter" refers to the events across Arab League countries in the Middle East and North Africa, including the Syrian civil war, the Iraqi insurgency and subsequent war in Iraq, the Egyptian Crisis, the Libyan crisis including the first and second civil wars, and the Yemeni crisis including the Yemeni civil war.

The term was coined by Chinese political scientist Zhang Weiwei during a debate with American political scientist Francis Fukuyama on 27 June 2011. Fukuyama believed the Arab Spring movement would spread to China, while Zhang predicted the Arab Spring would soon turn into an Arab Winter.

According to scholars of the University of Warsaw, the Arab Spring fully devolved into the Arab Winter in 2014, four years after its onset. The Arab Winter is characterized by the emergence of multiple regional wars, mounting regional instability, economic and demographic decline of Arab countries, and ethno-religious sectarian strife. According to a study by the American University of Beirut, by the summer of 2014, the Arab Winter had resulted in nearly a quarter of a million deaths and millions of refugees. Perhaps the most significant event of the Arab Winter was the rise of the Islamic State, which controlled swathes of land in the region from 2014 to 2019.

In 2020, several armed conflicts that could be seen as results of the Arab Spring were ongoing. The Syrian civil war, as of mid-2020, had caused massive political instability and economic hardship in Syria, with the Syrian currency plunging to new lows. Further, as of mid-2020, a civil war and subsequent intervention by Saudi Arabia continued in Yemen.

== History by country ==
=== Algeria ===
The 2010–2012 Algerian protests were a series of protests taking place throughout Algeria, lasting from 28 December 2010 to early 2012. The protests had been inspired by similar protests across the Middle East and North Africa. Causes cited by the protesters included unemployment, the lack of housing, food-price inflation, corruption, restrictions on freedom of speech and poor living conditions.

The 2019–2021 Algerian protests, also called Revolution of Smiles, began on 16 February 2019, six days after Abdelaziz Bouteflika announced his candidacy for a fifth presidential term in a signed statement. The protests were peaceful and led the military to insist on Bouteflika's immediate resignation, which took place on 2 April 2019. By early May, a significant number of power-brokers close to the deposed administration, including the former president's younger brother Saïd, had been arrested.

The 2019 Algerian presidential election was held in Algeria on 12 December 2019. After Bouteflika resigned on 2 April, Abdelkader Bensalah was elected acting president by parliament a week later. On 10 April the election was rescheduled for 4 July. On 2 June the Constitutional Council postponed the elections again, citing a lack of candidates. In a 200000 strong protest on 1 November, Algerian protestors rejected the 12 December election and called for a radical change in the system to take place first. The Forces of the Democratic Alternative (FDA) alliance and the Justice and Development Front also called for boycotting the 12 December election, and the FDA called for creating a constituent assembly.

=== Angola ===
On 21 January 2010 the National Assembly of Angola approved a new constitution to replace the interim constitution that had been in effect since independence in 1975. The Assembly approved this constitution in its entirety, by a 186–0 vote. Two assembly members abstained. The vote in the national assembly was boycotted by the opposition (UNITA) party, which claimed that the constitutional process had been flawed and undermined democracy.

=== Burkina Faso ===
On 15 February 2011, soldiers mutinied in the capital Ouagadougou over unpaid housing allowances; President Blaise Compaoré briefly fled the capital and sought safety in his hometown of Ziniaré. By Sunday 17 April, the mutiny had spread to the town of Pô in southern Burkina Faso; there were also protests over a court's decision to sentence several officers to prison sentences. The mutiny followed popular protests over rising prices in several cities across Burkina Faso, and protests starting 22 February over the death of a student in police custody in February, as well as the shooting of several other protesters. Five student protesters were reportedly killed in February.

The 2014 Burkinabé uprising was a series of demonstrations and riots in Burkina Faso in October 2014 that quickly spread to multiple cities. They began in response to attempts at changing the constitution to allow President Blaise Compaoré to run again and extend his 27 years in office. Pressure for political change came from civil society and in particular from the country's youth. Following a tumultuous day on 30 October, which included the involvement of former Defence Minister Kouamé Lougué and the burning of the National Assembly and other government buildings as well as the ruling Congress for Democracy and Progress party's headquarters, Compaoré dissolved the government and declared a state of emergency before eventually fleeing to Côte d'Ivoire with the support of President Alassane Ouattara.

The 2015 Burkinabé coup d'état was launched on 16 September 2015 in Burkina Faso, when members of the Regiment of Presidential Security (RSP) – a controversial autonomous military unit, formed under President Blaise Compaoré – detained the country's government. Among those detained were the transitional President Michel Kafando, Prime Minister Yacouba Isaac Zida (who was also the former deputy commander of the RSP), and numerous members of the cabinet. This transitional government was formed in the wake of the 2014 uprising. However, the junta failed to consolidate its authority across the country, and faced protests as well as intense pressure from regional leaders, and eventually from the regular army, to restore the transitional government. Ultimately, after the regular army entered Ouagadougou to confront the RSP, Kafando was restored as president on 23 September 2015.

The 2016 Burkinabé coup d'état attempt was an attempt to overthrow the government of Burkina Faso on 8 October 2016. At least 30 ex-members of the elite presidential guard (known as the RSP) planned an attack on three locations: the presidential residence, an Army barracks, and a prison in Ouagadougou, the capital of Burkina Faso. Two people were killed and at least ten other people have been arrested in connection with the attempt.

=== Burundi ===
Presidential elections were held in Burundi on June 28, 2010. As a result of withdrawals and alleged fraud and intimidation, incumbent President Pierre Nkurunziza was the only candidate. In early March 2010, the run-up to the election was described as "explosive" due to a combination of demobilized former combatants and violence between youth activists in the ruling CNDD-FDD and opposition FRODEBU. On June 1, 2010, five opposition candidates, including Agathon Rwasa, who was considered the strongest contender, withdrew from the elections, alleging that the government intended to rig it. Parliamentary elections were held in Burundi on July 23, 2010. The opposition parties boycotted the election after also boycotting the presidential election.

On April 25, 2015, the incumbent President of Burundi, Pierre Nkurunziza, announced he would run for a third term in the 2015 presidential election. The announcement sparked protests by those opposed to Nkurunziza seeking a third term in office. Widespread demonstrations in the then-capital, Bujumbura, lasted for over three weeks. As a result of the protests, the government also shut down the country's Internet and telephone network, closed all of the country's universities, and publicly referred to the protesters as "terrorists". Tens of thousands of people fled the country, hundreds of people were arrested, and several protesters and police were killed.

On May 13, 2015, a coup d'état was attempted, led by Major General Godefroid Niyombare, while President Nkurunziza was in Tanzania attending an emergency conference about the situation in the country. By the next day the coup collapsed and government forces reasserted control. At least 240 people were killed over the next few months, and on December 11, 87 people were killed in attacks on state targets. Violence continued through 2017.

=== Cameroon ===
The 2016–17 Cameroonian protests began on October 6, 2016, as a sit-down strike initiated by the Cameroon Anglophone Civil Society Consortium (CACSC), an organization consisting of lawyer and teacher trade unions from the Anglophone regions of Cameroon. The strike was led by Barrister Agbor Balla, Fontem Neba, and Tassang Wilfred. Within two weeks, more than 100 activists had reportedly been arrested. Six were reported dead. Unconfirmed videos released over social media depicted a variety of violent scenes, including demonstrators "parading the dead body of an activist, barricades set ablaze, [and] police brutally beating protesters and firing tear gas against the crowds".

In September 2017, separatists in the Anglophone territories of Northwest Region and Southwest Region (collectively known as Southern Cameroons) declared the independence of Ambazonia and began fighting against the Government of Cameroon. Starting as a low-scale insurgency, the conflict spread to most parts of the Anglophone regions within a year. By the summer of 2019, the government controlled the major cities and parts of the countryside, while the separatists held parts of the countryside and regularly appeared in the major cities. The war has killed approximately 3,000 people and forced more than half a million people to flee their homes. Although 2019 saw the first known instance of dialogue between Cameroon and the separatists, as well as a state-organized national dialogue and the granting of a special status to the Anglophone regions, the war continued to intensify in late 2019. Internal divisions among the separatists since the 2019 Ambazonian leadership crisis has complicated the situation.

=== Central African Republic ===
In the Central African Republic Bush War (2004–2007), the government of President François Bozizé fought with rebels until a peace agreement in 2007. The Central African Republic Civil War arose when a new coalition of varied rebel groups, known as Séléka, accused the government of failing to abide by the peace agreements and captured many towns at the end of 2012. The capital was seized by the rebels in March 2013, Bozizé fled the country, and the rebel leader Michel Djotodia declared himself president. Renewed fighting began between Séléka and militias called anti-balaka. In September 2013, President Djotodia disbanded the Séléka coalition, which had lost its unity after taking power, and in January 2014, Djotodia resigned. He was replaced by Catherine Samba-Panza, but the conflict continued. In July 2014, ex-Séléka factions and anti-balaka representatives signed a ceasefire agreement in Brazzaville. By the end of 2014, the country was de facto partitioned with the anti-Balaka controlling the south and west, from which most Muslims had evacuated, and ex-Seleka groups controlling the north and east.

By 2015, there was little government control outside of the capital, Bangui. The dissolution of Seleka led to ex-Seleka fighters forming new militia that often fight each other. The rebel leader Noureddine Adam declared the autonomous Republic of Logone on December 14, 2015. In February 2016, after a peaceful election, the former Prime Minister Faustin-Archange Touadéra was elected president. In Western CAR, another rebel group, with no known links to Seleka or Antibalaka, called Return, Reclamation, Rehabilitation (3R) formed in 2015 reportedly by self-proclaimed general Sidiki Abass, claiming to be protecting Muslim Fulani people from an Antibalaka militia led by Abbas Rafal. By 2017, more than 14 armed groups vied for territory, notably four factions formed by ex-Séléka leaders who control about 60% of the country's territory. With the de facto partition of the country between ex-Séléka militias in the north and east and Antibalaka militias in the south and west, hostilities between both sides decreased but sporadic fighting continued.

=== Côte d'Ivoire ===
Presidential elections were held in Ivory Coast in 2010. The first round was held on October 31, and a second round, in which President Laurent Gbagbo faced opposition leader Alassane Ouattara, was held on November 28, 2010. After northern candidate Alassane Ouattara was declared the victor of the 2010 Ivorian presidential election by the country's Independent Electoral Commission (CEI), the President of the Constitutional Council – an ally of Gbagbo – declared the results to be invalid and that Gbagbo was the winner. Both Gbagbo and Ouattara claimed victory and took the presidential oath of office.

After the disputed election, sporadic outbreaks of violence took place, particularly in Abidjan, where supporters of Ouattara clashed repeatedly with government forces and militias. Gbagbo's forces were said to be responsible for a campaign of assassinations, beatings and abductions directed against Ouattara's supporters. The Second Ivorian Civil War broke out in March 2011 when the crisis in Ivory Coast escalated into full-scale military conflict as Ouattara's forces seized control of most of the country with the help of the UN, with Gbagbo entrenched in Abidjan, the country's largest city. Overall casualties of the war were estimated around 3000.

The UN and French forces took military action, with the stated objective to protect their forces and civilians. Gbagbo was arrested April 11, 2011 by pro-Ouattara forces, who were supported by French troops. Gbagbo was then extradited to The Hague in November 2011, where he was charged with four counts of crimes against humanity in the International Criminal Court in connection with the post-election violence.

Presidential elections were held in Ivory Coast on October 25, 2015. President Alassane Ouattara stood again to seek a second term. Opposition party Ivorian Popular Front (FPI) called for a boycott of the elections in protest against the trial of former President Laurent Gbagbo by the International Criminal Court. But others felt the party needed to remain engaged in the electoral process. The vote was relatively peaceful, compared to the unrest that marred previous elections, although voter turnout was down to 54.6%. Outtara avoided a second round vote and won a second term in office after garnering 83.7%, in a landslide victory over his nearest rival Affi N'Guessan on 9.3%.

=== Democratic Republic of the Congo ===
The 2011 Democratic Republic of the Congo coup d'état attempt was a failed coup attempt against President Joseph Kabila on February 27, 2011. General elections were held in Democratic Republic of the Congo on November 28, 2011. The government passed laws to abolish the second round of the presidential election, which was strongly criticized by the opposition.

In April 2012, former National Congress for the Defence of the People (CNDP) soldiers mutinied against the DRC government and the peacekeeping contingent of the MONUSCO. Mutineers formed a rebel group called the March 23 Movement (M23), allegedly sponsored by the government of the neighbouring states of Rwanda and Uganda. On November 20, 2012, M23 rebels took control of Goma, a North Kivu provincial capital with a population of one million people. By the end of November that year, the conflict had forced more than 140,000 people to flee their homes. On November 7, 2013, following significant defeats to a UN-backed government offensive, M23 troops crossed into Uganda and surrendered.

On January 17, 2015, the Congolese National Assembly (the country's lower house) voted to revise the electoral law in the country's constitution. The new law that would allow Kabila, to remain in power until a national census could be conducted. Elections had been planned for 2016 and a census would be a massive undertaking that would likely take several years for the developing country. On January 19, 2015, protests led by students at the University of Kinshasa broke out in the Democratic Republic of the Congo. By January 21, clashes between police and protesters had claimed at least 42 lives.

On December 20, 2016, Kabila, announced that he would not leave office despite the end of his constitutional term. Protests subsequently broke out across the country. The protests were met with the government's blocking of social media, and violence from security forces which left dozens dead. On December 23 an agreement was proposed between the main opposition group and the Kabila led-government under which the latter agreed not to alter the constitution and to leave office before the end of 2017.

General elections were held in the Democratic Republic of the Congo on December 30, 2018, to determine a successor to President Kabila, Félix Tshisekedi (UDPS) won with 38.6% of the vote, defeating another opposition candidate, Martin Fayulu, and Emmanuel Ramazani Shadary, backed by the ruling party PPRD. Fayulu alleged that the vote was rigged against him in a deal made by Tshisekedi and outgoing President Kabila, challenging the result in the DRC's Constitutional Court. Different election observers, including those from the country's Roman Catholic Church, also cast doubt on the official result. Parties supporting President Kabila won the majority of seats in the National Assembly. Félix Tshisekedi was sworn in as the 5th President of the Democratic Republic of the Congo on January 24, 2019.

=== Egypt ===
The Egyptian parliamentary elections of 2010 first voting round was held in Egypt on November 28, 2010 and the second round was held on December 5, 2010. Human rights groups said this was the "most fraudulent poll ever" in Egypt's history. It is considered to have been a factor in the Egyptian Revolution that started on January 25, 2011, and spread across Egypt. Millions of protesters from a range of socio-economic and religious backgrounds demanded the overthrow of Egyptian President Hosni Mubarak. Violent clashes between security forces and protesters resulted in at least 846 people killed and over 6,000 injured. Protesters retaliated by burning over 90 police stations across the country.

On February 11, 2011, Vice President Omar Suleiman announced that Mubarak resigned as president, turning power over to the Supreme Council of the Armed Forces (SCAF). The military junta, headed by Mohamed Hussein Tantawi, announced on February 13 that the constitution was suspended and the military would govern until elections could be held. The previous cabinet, including Prime Minister Ahmed Shafik, would serve as a caretaker government until a new one was formed.

A presidential election was held in two rounds, the first on May 23 and 24, 2012 and the second on June 16 and 17. Following the second round, with a voter turnout of 52%, on June 24, 2012, Egypt's election commission announced that Muslim Brotherhood candidate Mohamed Morsi had won Egypt's presidential elections by a narrow margin over Shafik. A further constitutional referendum was held in two rounds on December 15 and 22, 2012. Unofficial results reported on December 23, 2012, found that 32.9% of the electorate voted and that the constitution was approved with 63.8% of the vote in favor over the two rounds of polling. During the campaign, supporters of the draft constitution argued that the constitution would provide stability. Most opponents argued that the constitution was too favorable to the Muslim Brotherhood, and did not grant sufficient minority rights. However, some extreme Salafists also opposed the constitution, arguing that it should have been based more closely on Sharia law.

On November 22, 2012, millions of protesters began protesting against Morsi, after his government announced a temporary constitutional declaration that in effect granted the president unlimited powers. Morsi deemed the decree necessary to protect the elected constituent assembly from a planned dissolution by judges appointed during the Mubarak era. The demonstrations were organized by Egyptian opposition organizations and individuals, mainly liberals, leftists, secularists and Christians. The demonstrations resulted in violent clashes between Morsi-supporters and the anti-Morsi protesters, with dozens of deaths and hundreds of injuries.

The 2013 Egyptian coup d'état took place on July 3, 2013. Egyptian army chief General Abdel Fattah al-Sisi led a coalition to remove Morsi from power and suspended the Egyptian constitution of 2012 after the military's ultimatum for the government to "resolve its differences" with protesters during widespread national protests. The military arrested Morsi and Muslim Brotherhood leaders, and declared Chief Justice of the Supreme Constitutional Court Adly Mansour as the interim president of Egypt. Ensuing protests in favour of Morsi were violently suppressed culminating with the dispersal and massacre of pro-Morsi sit-ins on August 14, 2013, amid ongoing unrest; journalists, and several hundred protestors were killed by police and military force.

On March 26, 2014, in response to calls from supporters to run for presidency, Sisi retired from his military career, announcing that he would run as a candidate in the 2014 presidential election. The election, held between May 26 and 28, featured one opponent, Hamdeen Sabahi, saw 47% participation by eligible voters, and resulted in Sisi winning in a landslide victory with 97% of the vote. Sisi was sworn into office as President of Egypt on June 8, 2014. In the undemocratic 2018 presidential election, Sisi faced only nominal opposition (a pro-government supporter, Moussa Mostafa Moussa) after the military arrest of Sami Anan and his enforced disappearance afterwards, threats made to Ahmed Shafik with old corruption charges and an alleged sex tape, and the withdrawal of Khaled Ali and Mohamed Anwar El-Sadat due to the overwhelming obstacles and violations made by the elections committee.

=== Eritrea ===
The 2010 Eritrean–Ethiopian border skirmish was fought as part of the Eritrean–Ethiopian border conflict between soldiers of the Eritrean and the Ethiopian armies at the border town of Zalambesa after Eritea claimed that Ethiopian forces crossed the border. The Ethiopian Government claimed Eritrea was trying to cover up an internal crisis by implicating Ethiopia.

The 2013 Eritrean Army mutiny was mounted on January 21, 2013, when around 100-200 soldiers of the Eritrean Army in the capital city, Asmara seized the headquarters of the state broadcaster, EriTV, and allegedly broadcast a message demanding reforms and the release of political prisoners. Opposition sources claimed it had been an abortive coup attempt.

After the Battle of Tsorona in 2016, Ethiopia stated in 2018 that it would cede Badme to Eritrea. This led to the Eritrea–Ethiopia summit on July 9, 2018, where an agreement was signed which demarcated the border and agreed a resumption of diplomatic relations.

=== Ethiopia ===
The 2014–2016 Oromo protests were a series of protests and resistance first sparked on 25 April 2014. In the three days leading up to 8 August 2016, Reuters reported that at least 90 protesters had been shot and killed by Ethiopian security forces, marking the most violent crackdown against protesters in sub-Saharan Africa since at least 75 people were killed during protests in Oromia Region in November and December 2015. According to Human Rights Watch, at least 500 people are estimated to have been killed as of October 2016.

A state of emergency was declared on Sunday, 9 October 2016 by Ethiopian Prime Minister Hailemariam Desalegn. The state of emergency authorized the military to enforce security nationwide. It also imposed restrictions on freedom of speech and access to information. Media reported the state of emergency's duration was announced for six months. It followed the protests by the Oromo and Amhara ethnic groups against the government controlled by people in the Tigrayan ethnic group, a smaller ethnic minority. It was the first time in approximately 25 years that a state of emergency had been declared in Ethiopia. In March 2017, Ethiopia's parliament voted to extend the state of emergency for another four months.

Since taking office in April 2018, Abiy Ahmed's government presided over the release of thousands of political prisoners from Ethiopian jails and the rapid opening of the country's political landscape. However, According to the NGOs Human Rights Watch, Committee to Protect Journalists and Amnesty International, Abiy's government had since mid-2019 been arresting Ethiopian journalists and closing media outlets.

In November 2019, the EPRDF dissolved, and Prime Minister and EPDRF chairman Abiy Ahmed merged most of the constituent parties of the coalition (except the TPLF) into a new party called the Prosperity Party. The party was officially founded on 1 December. However, following the dissolution of the ethnic federalist, dominant party political coalition, there was an increase in tensions within the country, with newly resurgent regional and ethnically based factions.

On 22 June 2019, factions of the security forces of the region attempted a coup d'état against the Amhara regional government, during which the President of the Amhara Region, Ambachew Mekonnen, was assassinated. A bodyguard siding with the nationalist factions assassinated General Se'are Mekonnen – the Chief of the General Staff of the Ethiopian National Defense Force – as well as his aide, Major General Gizae Aberra. The Prime Minister's Office accused Brigadier General Asaminew Tsige, head of the Amhara region security forces, of leading the plot, and Tsige was shot dead by police near Bahir Dar on 24 June.

Starting in June 2019, fighting in the Metekel Zone of the Benishangul-Gumuz Region in Ethiopia has reportedly involved militias from the Gumuz people. Gumuz are alleged to have formed militias such as Buadin and the Gumuz Liberation Front that have staged attacks. According to Amnesty International, the 22–23 December 2020 attacks were by Gumuz against Amhara, Oromo and Shinasha, who the Gumuz nationalists viewed as "settlers".

=== Guinea ===
In early 2013, protests against the government by those in the opposition who feared a rigged election left over 50 people dead. The opposition demanded that Waymark, a South African firm contracted to revise voter lists, be replaced because of allegedly inflated voter lists. It also said expatriate Guineans should be allowed to vote. On May 29, President Alpha Conde announced a judicial investigation into protests the prior week that killed at least 12 people. He also replaced Interior Minister Mouramany Cisse with Guinean Ambassador to Senegal Madifing Diane. Ethnic clashes continued in July leading to over 50 deaths. In September, a police officer was killed and 49 people injured in clashes in the capital Conakry.

Legislative elections were held on September 28, 2013, after numerous delays and postponements. President Alpha Condé's party, the Rally of the Guinean People (RPG) emerged as the largest party in the National Assembly with 53 of the 114 seats. Parties allied with the RDG won seven seats and opposition parties won the remaining 53 seats. Opposition leaders denounced the official results as fraudulent.

=== Guinea-Bissau ===
Military unrest occurred in Guinea-Bissau on 1 April 2010. Prime Minister Carlos Gomes Junior was placed under house arrest by soldiers, who also detained Army Chief of Staff Zamora Induta. Supporters of Gomes and his party, PAIGC, reacted to the move of the military by demonstrating in the capital, Bissau; Antonio Indjai, the Deputy Chief of Staff, then warned that he would have Gomes killed if the protests continued.

The situation was less tense by 2 April The government held a meeting and condemned the soldiers' treatment of Gomes. Subsequently, the soldiers took Gomes to meet with President Sanha; after the meeting, Gomes declared that he would not resign. He appeared to downplay the situation, describing it as an "incident" and saying that "institutions will return to their normal functions."

A delegation headed by presidential adviser Mario Cabral visited Induta, who remained in detention at a barracks, on 3 April. According to Cabral, Induta was "being treated well and is fine". Prime Minister Gomes left Guinea-Bissau in late April 2010 and went to Portugal, where he remained for several months; his extended stay in Portugal was officially explained as being related to his health. He eventually returned to Bissau on 16 June. Gomes met with Indjai, who subsequently said that he and Gomes could cooperate and "everything has now been smoothed out."

=== Libya ===
The First Libyan Civil War was ignited by protests in Benghazi beginning on Tuesday, 15 February 2011, which led to clashes with security forces that fired on the crowd. The protests escalated into a rebellion that spread across the country, with the forces opposing Gaddafi establishing an interim governing body, the National Transitional Council. The United Nations Security Council passed an initial resolution on 26 February, freezing the assets of Gaddafi and his inner circle and restricting their travel, and referred the matter to the International Criminal Court for investigation.

In early March, Gaddafi's forces rallied, pushed eastwards and re-took several coastal cities before reaching Benghazi. A further UN resolution authorised member states to establish and enforce a no-fly zone over Libya, and to use "all necessary measures" to prevent attacks on civilians, which turned into a bombing campaign by the forces of NATO against military installations and civilian infrastructure of Libya. The Gaddafi government then announced a ceasefire, but fighting and bombing continued. Throughout the conflict, rebels rejected government offers of a ceasefire and efforts by the African Union to end the fighting because the plans set forth did not include the removal of Gaddafi.

In August, rebel forces launched an offensive on the government-held coast of Libya, backed by a wide-reaching NATO bombing campaign, taking back territory lost months before and ultimately capturing the capital city of Tripoli, while Gaddafi evaded capture and loyalists engaged in a rearguard campaign. On 16 September 2011, the National Transitional Council was recognised by the United Nations as the legal representative of Libya, replacing the Gaddafi government. Muammar Gaddafi evaded capture until 20 October 2011, when he was captured and killed in Sirte. The National Transitional Council "declared the liberation of Libya" and the official end of the war on 23 October 2011.

Elections were held in July 2012 to a General National Congress (GNC), which took power a month later, charged with organising a constituent assembly for authoring Libya's new constitution. The NTC was formally dissolved, and in November 2012 Ali Zeidan was sworn in as Prime Minister. In March 2014, Zeidan was ousted by the GNC, amid escalating conflict in the country. On 4 August 2014, the GNC was replaced by a newly elected House of Representatives (CoD), but on 25 August 2014, some members of the former GNC reconvened unilaterally and said they had elected Omar al-Hasi as Prime Minister, effectively leaving the country with two rival governments: the one proclaimed by the CoD in Tobruk and the one proclaimed by the claimant GNC in Tripoli.

The General National Congress, based in western Libya and backed by various militias with some support from Qatar and Turkey, initially accepted the results of the 2014 election, but rejected them after the Supreme Constitutional Court nullified an amendment regarding the roadmap for Libya's transition and HoR elections. The House of Representatives (or Council of Deputies) was in control of eastern and central Libya and had the loyalty of the Libyan National Army (LNA), and was supported by airstrikes by Egypt and the UAE.

=== Madagascar ===
A constitutional referendum was held in Madagascar on 17 November 2010, in which voters approved a proposal for the state's fourth Constitution. The Malagasy people were asked to answer "Yes" or "No" to the proposed new constitution, which was considered to help consolidate Andry Rajoelina's grip on power. Rajoelina heads the governing Highest Transitional Authority (HAT), an interim junta established following the military-backed coup d'état against then President Marc Ravalomanana in March 2009. Madagascar's three main political parties: Tiako i Madagasikara, AREMA, and AVI, each headed by a former president, called for a boycott of the election.

On election day, reports indicated that 21 military officers had taken control of the country. The coup attempt leaders were ex-Defense Minister Noel Rakotonandrasanana and Colonel Charles Andrianasoaviana, the head of the Special Intervention Force. They said all government institutions had been suspended and a military council would govern. The following day, the army chief, General Andre Ndriarijoana, met the rebellious soldiers, however no conclusive statement was made. Three days after the coup, security forces attacked the base, and, following a brief firefight, the rebel soldiers surrendered.

On September 17, 2011, a "Roadmap for Ending the Crisis in Madagascar," was signed by opposition leaders that was backed by the Southern African Development Community, or SADC. This resolution aimed at creating a stable government once more, and ending the political crisis that endured in Madagascar. The HAT repeatedly rescheduled the general election, which was held on 20 December 2013, following a first round of presidential elections on 25 October. The presidential elections in December were a runoff between Jean Louis Robinson and Hery Rajaonarimampianina, the top two candidates to emerge from the first round of voting in October. The official results of the second round were announced on 7 January 2014 with Rajaonarimampianina proclaimed the victor with nearly 54% of the vote. This election ended the HAT and restored a regular constitutional government in Madagascar.

=== Mali ===
On January 16, 2012, several insurgent groups began fighting a campaign against the Malian government for independence or greater autonomy for northern Mali, an area of northern Mali they called Azawad. The National Movement for the Liberation of Azawad (MNLA), an organization fighting to make this area of Mali an independent homeland for the Tuareg people, had taken control of the region by April 2012. The MNLA were initially backed by the Islamist group Ansar Dine. After the Malian military was driven from northern Mali, Ansar Dine and a number of smaller Islamist groups began imposing strict Sharia law, and the Tuareg group broke away from them. French Armed Forces and members of the African Union helped the government regain control of the area, and a peace agreement was signed in February 2015.

=== Mozambique ===
The RENAMO insurgency was a guerrilla campaign by militants of the RENAMO party in Mozambique. The insurgency is widely considered to be an aftershock of the Mozambican Civil War; it resulted in renewed tensions between RENAMO and Mozambique's ruling FRELIMO coalition over charges of state corruption and the disputed results of 2014 general elections. A ceasefire was announced between the government and the rebels in September 2014. However, renewed tensions sparked violence in mid-2015. A peace agreement was signed on August 6, 2019.

=== Niger ===
A coup d'état occurred in Niger on 18 February 2010. Soldiers attacked the presidential palace in Niamey under weapons fire at midday and captured President Mamadou Tandja, who was chairing a government meeting at the time. Later in the day, the rebels announced on television the formation of the Supreme Council for the Restoration of Democracy (CSRD), headed by chef d'escadron Salou Djibo. The coup followed a year-long political crisis in Niger related to President Tandja's efforts to extend his mandate when his second term was originally scheduled to end.

During the two days following the coup, thousands of people demonstrated in the streets to support the military government and its stated intention of installing democracy. Indeed, the junta scheduled a referendum later that year to ask the public whether the junta should hand over power within the year, which passed successfully. As stipulated by the referendum, the junta scheduled free and fair elections for 2011, in which former opposition leader Mahamadou Issoufou was elected president, and returned control of the government.

=== Zambia ===
On October 29 2014, Guy Scott, the Vice-President of Zambia, becomes the interim President following the death of Michael Sata in London. This made him the first head of state of European White descent in Africa since F. W. de Klerk in 1989, and the first-ever under a democratically elected government.

=== South Sudan ===
The South Sudanese Civil War broke out in 2013 after a disputed elected and an alleged coup d'état attempt. An estimated 300,000 people have been killed in the fighting, and over 4 million have been displaced. One hundred thousand people face starvation, and nearly 5 million face severe food shortages; the government declared a famine in 2017. Several fruitless efforts to agree to a settlement were made in 2014. Fighting continued until a compromise peace agreement was signed in 2015, but fighting broke out again in 2016. The African Union deployed a 12,000 member peace force including soldiers from Ethiopia, Kenya, Rwanda, Sudan, and Uganda, over the objections of President Salva Kiir. However, fighting continued through 2017.

=== Sudan ===
The War in Darfur, (Sudan) began in 2003, resulting in hundreds of thousands of deaths, genocide, and ethnic cleansing. An International Criminal Court investigation resulted in two warrants against President Omar al-Bashir and his eventual arrest. The Doha Agreement was signed in 2011, but little real progress was made a year later. The war continued through 2016, including with allegations that the government had used mustard gas.

=== Tunisia ===
A period of civil resistance characterized by riots and unrest took place throughout the nation following the self-immolation of Mohamed Bouazizi on 17 December 2011 and fueled by high unemployment, corruption, political repression and poor living conditions forcing President Zine El Abidine Ben Ali to flee the country ending his 23-year rule over Tunisia. This was followed by the suspension then dissolution of the former ruling RCD party and the resignation of Prime Minister Mohamed Ghannouchi amid further public pressure.

Following the revolution, an election for a constituent assembly which had 217 seats was held on 23 October 2011 that saw the Ennahda Movement led by Rashid al-Ghannushi win a plurality in the election (41% of the seats) closely followed by the Congress for the Republic (CPR) led by Moncef Marzouki (13.4% of the seats) who was later elected as President of Tunisia by the Constituent Assembly. The Ennahda Movement had long been banned by former President Ben Ali. Following the revolution, it described itself to be a "moderate Islamist" party by advocating democracy and political pluralism while its critics viewed it as a threat to secularism.

A political crisis evolved in Tunisia following the assassination of leftist leader Mohamed Brahmi in late July 2013, during which the country's mainly secular opposition organized several protests against the ruling Troika alliance that was dominated by Rashid al-Ghannushi's Islamist Ennahda Movement. Other factors included the assassination of Mohamed Brahmi on 25 July, the government's failure to deal with the rise of hardline Salafist groups including Ansar al-Sharia which is widely believed to be behind the assassinations, as well as many other attacks on security personnel and state institutions.

== See also ==
- 2020s in African history
