= 2027 in Lesotho =

- Decades: 2000s; 2010s; 2020s
- See also: Other events of 2027; List of years in Lesotho

Events in the year 2027 in Lesotho.

== Events ==
=== Predicted or scheduled ===
- Next Lesotho general election

== Holidays ==
- January 1 – New Year's Day
- March 11 – Moshoeshoe's Day
- March 26 – Good Friday
- March 29 – Easter Monday
- May 1 – Workers' Day
- May 6 – Ascension Day
- May 25 – Africa Day
- July 17 – King's Birthday
- October 4 – Independence Day
- December 25 – Christmas Day
- December 26 – Boxing Day
