= Thabane =

Thabane is a South African name that may refer to:

- Lipolelo Thabane (1959–2017), Mosotho political figure
- Maesiah Thabane (born 1977), wife of Tom
- Thabane Rankara (born 1978), Mosotho football player
- Thabane Sutu, Lesotho football coach and player
- Tom Thabane (born 1939), Mosotho politician and Prime Minister of Lesotho
