= 2020 in Lesotho =

- Decades: 2000s; 2010s; 2020s
- See also: Other events of 2020; List of years in Lesotho

== Incumbents ==
- Head of state: King: Letsie III (since 7 February 1996)
- Head of government: Prime Minister: Tom Thabane (16 June 2017 to 20 May 2020), Moeketsi Majoro (since 20 May 2020).

== Events ==
- 6 February – Lesotho's First Lady, Maesiah Thabane is arrested for murdering her predecessor, Lipolelo Thabane in 2017.
- 20 February – Former prime minister Thomas Thabane, 80, of Lesotho is to be charged with his wife's 2017 murder.
- 11 March – Moshoeshoe Day, Lesotho
- 18 April – Prime Minister Thomas Thabane deploys the army to the streets of Lesotho to restore order.
- 30 April – COVID-19 pandemic: Lesotho is the only African country that has not reported the virus.
- 8 May – Lesotho Prime Minister Thomas Thabane will step down in July as the country's leader.
- 13 May – COVID-19 pandemic: Lesotho report its first case of the virus, becoming the last country in Africa to do so.
- 20 May - Moeketsi Majoro replaces Thomas Thabane as Prime Minister of Lesotho.
