= 2019 in Lesotho =

- Decades: 1990s; 2000s; 2010s; 2020s
- See also: Other events of 2019; List of years in Lesotho

== Incumbents ==
- Head of state: King: Letsie III (since February 7, 1996)
- Head of government: Prime Minister: Tom Thabane

== Events ==
- August – Lesotho at the 2019 African Games
