= 2020s in Africa =

Events from the decade 2020s in Africa.

== International events in Africa ==
=== Major drought in Southern Africa ===
In 2024, a drought and subsequent food shortages in Southern Africa threatened to become a major humanitarian catastrophe, according to warnings by the United Nations.

== History by country ==
=== Algeria ===
In July 2021, Amnesty International and Forbidden Stories reported, that Morocco had targeted more than 6,000 Algerian phones, including those of politicians and high-ranking military officials, with the Pegasus spyware. In August 2021, Algeria blamed Morocco and Israel of supporting the Movement for the self-determination of Kabylia, which the Algerian President Abdelmadjid Tebboune accused of being involved in the wildfires in northern Algeria. Tebboune accused Morocco for perpetrating hostile acts. In the same month, King Mohammed VI of Morocco reached out for reconciliation with Algeria and offered assistance in Algeria's battle against the fires. Algeria did not respond to the offer.

On 18 August 2021, Tebboune chaired an extraordinary meeting of the High Security Council to review Algeria's relations to Morocco. The president ordered an intensification of security controls at the borders. On 24 August 2021, Algerian foreign minister Ramtane Lamamra announced the break of diplomatic relations with Morocco. On 27 August 2021, Morocco closed the country's embassy in Algiers, Algeria. Furthermore, on 22 September 2021, Algeria's Supreme Security Council determined to close its airspace to all Moroccan civilian and military aircraft.

=== Burkina Faso ===
A coup d'état was launched in Burkina Faso on 24 January 2022. Gunfire erupted in front of the presidential residence in the Burkinabé capital Ouagadougou and several military barracks around the city. Soldiers were reported to have seized control of the military base in the capital. The government denied there was an active coup in the country. Several hours later, President Roch Marc Christian Kaboré was reported to have been detained by the soldiers at the military camp in the capital. On 24 January, the military announced on television that Kaboré had been deposed from his position as president. After the announcement, the military declared that the parliament, government and constitution had been dissolved. The coup d'état was led by military officer Paul-Henri Sandaogo Damiba.

A statement from the Twitter account of Roch Marc Christian Kaboré urged dialogue and invited the opposing soldiers to lay down arms but did not address whether he was in detention. Meanwhile, soldiers were reported to have surrounded the state news station RTB. AFP News reported the president had been arrested along with other government officials. Two security officials said at the Sangoulé Lamizana barracks in the capital, "President Kaboré, the head of parliament, and the ministers are effectively in the hands of the soldiers."

Military captain Sidsoré Kader Ouedraogo said the Patriotic Movement for Safeguarding and Restoration "has decided to assume its responsibilities before history." In a statement, he said soldiers were putting an end to Kaboré's presidency because of the deteriorating security situation amid the deepening Islamic insurgency and the president's inability to manage the crisis. He also said the new military leaders would work to establish a calendar "acceptable to everyone" for holding new elections, without giving further details. ECOWAS and African Union suspended Burkina Faso's membership in the aftermath of the coup. On 31 January, the military junta restored the constitution and appointed Paul-Henri Sandaogo Damiba as interim president.

Damiba's rule was unpopular and lasted only 8 months, until he himself was deposed in the subsequent coup d'état in September 2022.

=== Chad ===
Presidential elections were held in Chad on 11 April 2021. Incumbent Idriss Déby, who served five consecutive terms since seizing power in the 1990 coup d'état, was running for a sixth. Déby was described as an authoritarian by several international media sources, and as "strongly entrenched". During previous elections, he forbade the citizens of Chad from making posts online, and while Chad's total ban on social media use was lifted in 2019, restrictions continue to exist.

Provisional results released on April 19 showed that incumbent president Idriss Déby won reelection with 79% of the vote. However, on 20 April it was announced by the military that Déby had been killed in action while leading his country's troops in a battle against rebels calling themselves the Front for Change and Concord in Chad (FACT).

Following president Déby's death, a body called the Transitional Military Council – led by his son Mahamat Déby Itno, dissolved the government and the legislature, and proclaimed that it would be assuming power for a period of 18 months. Thereafter, a new presidential election would be held. Some political actors within Chad have labeled the installing of the transitional military government a "coup", as the constitutional provisions regarding the filling of a presidential vacancy were not followed. Namely, according to the constitution, the President of the National Assembly, Haroun Kabadi, should have been named Acting President after Déby's death, and an early election called within a period of no less than 45 and no more than 90 days from the time of the vacancy.

=== Democratic Republic of Congo ===
Thirty-two members of the Parliament of the Democratic Republic of the Congo died of COVID-19.

=== Eswatini ===
The Prime Minister Ambrose Mandvulo Dlamini died of COVID-19 in 2020.

A series of protests in Eswatini against the monarchy and for democratisation began in late June 2021. Starting as a peaceful protest on 20 June, they escalated after 25 June into violence and looting over the weekend as the government took a hardline stance against the demonstrations and prohibited the delivery of petitions.

=== Ethiopia ===
Tensions began to rise again between Ethiopia and Eritrea, after several years of efforts to negotiate peace, due to possible border disputes.

After having won the Nobel Peace Prize in 2019, Prime Minister Abiy Ahmed's government adopted some policies which raised some concerns about political developments in Ethiopia. Abiy dissolved the governing coalition and formed a new party, the Prosperity Party; some said the imposition of a brand-new political party was detrimental to political stability. Also, the government enacted some restrictions on some forms of expression which raised concern about standards of free speech. Abiy's response to rebel groups has raised some concerns about undue harshness, although some others allege that he was originally too lenient. Amnesty International raised concerns about the status of one opposition leader. Abiy encouraged Ethiopian refugees to return home, due to improving conditions.

On November 4, 2020, the Ethiopian National Defense Force launched a civil war against the Tigray People's Liberation Front (TPLF) in the Tigray Region, which it claimed was in response to an attack on its troops. This followed month of feuding between the central and regional governments over elections and funding. The Tigray forces launched rockets at the airport of Asmara, capital of neighbouring Eritrea, claiming that forces from there had taken part in the offensive. Amnesty International reported that a massacre had taken place in Tigray, with TPLF-affiliated forces claimed to be responsible.

Concurrently, there was also another conflict ongoing in the Oromia Region, as well as also ongoing Afar–Somali clashes between the Afar and Somali Regions of Ethiopia. In October 2020, 27 people were killed. On 2 April 2021, 100 cattle herders were reportedly shot dead. On July 24, 2021, clashes erupted in the town of Garbaiisa, the clashes killing 300 were followed by massive protests in the Somali region resulting in the only road and rail line that goes into Djibouti where 95% of Ethiopia's maritime trade goes through.

=== Gabon ===
On 30 August 2023, a coup d'état occurred in the Gabonese Republic shortly after the announcement that incumbent president Ali Bongo Ondimba had won the general election held on 26 August. Following presidential elections held on 26 August 2023, the incumbent president, Ali Bongo, who had been seeking re-election for a third term, was declared the winner according to an official announcement made on 30 August. However, allegations of electoral fraud and irregularities immediately emerged from opposition parties and independent observers, casting doubt over the legitimacy of the election results. Amidst growing scrutiny and widespread protests over the conduct of the elections, the Armed Forces of Gabon launched a pre-dawn coup on 30 August. Soldiers led by high-ranking officers seized control of key government buildings, communication channels, and strategic points within the capital Libreville. Gunfire was also heard in the city.

=== Guinea ===
In 2020, President of Guinea Alpha Condé changed the constitution by referendum to allow himself to secure a third term, a controversial change which spurred the 2019–2020 Guinean protests. During the last year of the second term and his third term, Condé cracked down on protests and on opposition candidates, some of whom died in prison, while the government struggled to contain price increases in basic commodities. On 5 September 2021, Condé was captured by the country's armed forces in a coup d'état after gunfire in the capital, Conakry. Special forces commander Mamady Doumbouya released a broadcast on state television announcing the dissolution of the constitution and government.

=== Guinea-Bissau ===
A coup d'état was attempted in Guinea-Bissau on 1 February 2022. A few hours later, president Umaro Sissoco Embaló declared the coup over, he said that "many" members of the security forces had been killed in a "failed attack against democracy."

=== Kenya ===
The Camp Simba attack by Al-Shabaab in January 2020 killed three Americans.

=== Lesotho ===
On 10 January 2020, an arrest warrant was issued for First Lady Maesiah Thabane, who was wanted in connection with the 2017 murder of Lipolelo Thabane. Maesaih Thabane went into hiding and Prime Minister Tom Thabane announced his intent to resign from office shortly after her arrest warrant was issued. On 20 February 2020, police announced that Thabane would also be charged with murder in the case.

=== Current crisis ===
The Libyan crisis is the current humanitarian crisis and political-military instability occurring in Libya, beginning with the Arab Spring protests of 2011, which led to two civil wars, foreign military intervention, and the ousting and killing of Muammar Gaddafi. The first civil war's aftermath and proliferation of armed groups led to violence and instability across the country, which erupted into renewed civil war in 2014. The second war lasted until 23 October 2020, when all parties agreed to a permanent ceasefire and negotiations.

The crisis in Libya has resulted in tens of thousands of casualties since the onset of violence in early 2011. During both civil wars, the output of Libya's economically crucial oil industry collapsed to a small fraction of its usual level, despite having the largest oil reserves of any African country, with most facilities blockaded or damaged by rival groups. The parallels between the revolutions in Libya and Syria are sometimes viewed in opposition to each other.

Since March 2022, two different governments control the country: the Tripoli-based and internationally recognized Government of National Unity, which controls the western part of the country and is led by Abdul Hamid Dbeibeh; and the House of Representatives-recognized Government of National Stability, which nominally governs the central and eastern part of Libya and is led by Osama Hammad under the de facto rule of the Libyan National Army and its commander Khalifa Haftar.

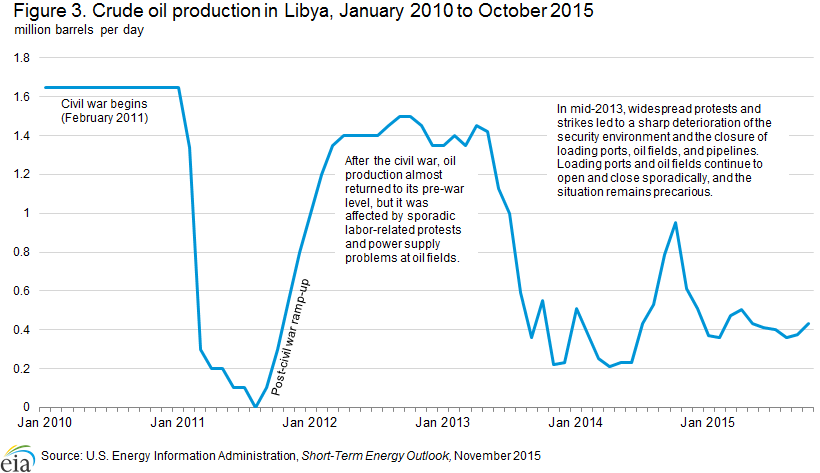
Libyan oil production collapsed during the two civil wars.

The war has caused a significant loss of economic potential in Libya, estimated at 783.2 billion Libyan dinars from 2011 to 2021. By 2022, the humanitarian situation had improved, though challenges remain.

=== New developments ===
A conference between representatives of Mediterranean Basin powers implicated in the Libyan armed conflict as well as Algeria, the Republic of Congo and major world powers took place in Berlin on 19 January 2020, declaring a 55-point list of Conclusions, creating a military 5+5 GNA+LNA followup committee, and an International Follow-up Committee to monitor progress in the peace process. In the intra-Libyan component of the 3-point process, the economic track was launched on 6 January 2020 in a meeting in Tunis between a diverse selection of 19 Libyan economic experts. The military track of the intra-Libyan negotiations started on 3 February with the 5+5 Libyan Joint Military Commission meeting in Geneva, between 5 senior military officers selected by the GNA and 5 selected by the LNA leader Khalifa Haftar. A major aim was to negotiate detailed monitoring to strengthen the 12 January ceasefire. The intra-Libyan political track was started on 26 February 2020 in Geneva. Salamé resigned from his UNSMIL position in early March 2020.

A 21 August 2020 announcement by GNA leader Fayez al-Sarraj and Aguila Saleh for the LNA declared a ceasefire, lifting of the oil blockade, the holding of parliamentary and presidential elections in March 2021, and a new joint presidential council to be guarded by a joint security force in Sirte. Followup meetings took place in Montreux on 7–9 September with support from UNSMIL and the Centre for Humanitarian Dialogue and, between five GNA and five House of Representatives (HoR) members on 11 September, in Bouznika. Both meetings appeared to achieve consensus.

The three-track intra-Libyan negotiations, chaired by Stephanie Williams of UNSMIL, continued following the August ceasefire and September Montreux meeting, with the political track evolving into the Libyan Political Dialogue Forum, and the military track leading to a 24 October 2020 agreement on a permanent ceasefire.

=== Malawi ===
The Constitutional Court ordered a re-run of the 2019 Malawian general election following “widespread, systematic and grave” problems with the process, leading to the 2020 Malawian presidential election.

=== Mali ===
On 18 August 2020, elements of the Malian Armed Forces began a coup. Soldiers on pick-up trucks stormed the Soundiata military base in the town of Kati, where gunfire was exchanged before weapons were distributed from the armory and senior officers arrested. Tanks and armoured vehicles were seen on the town's streets, as well as military trucks heading for the capital, Bamako. The soldiers detained several government officials including the President Ibrahim Boubacar Keïta who resigned and dissolved the government.

The 2021 Malian coup d'état began on the night of 24 May 2021 when the Malian Army led by Vice President Assimi Goïta captured President Bah N'daw, Prime Minister Moctar Ouane and Minister of Defence Souleymane Doucouré. Assimi Goïta, the head of the junta that led the 2020 coup d'état, announced that N'daw and Ouane were stripped of their powers and that new elections would be held in 2022. It is the country's third coup d'état in ten years, following the 2012 and 2020 military takeovers with the latter only having happened nine months earlier. The African Union suspended the country's membership in response. On July 20, a knifeman wounded President Goïta in the arm at a mosque in Bamako in an attack described as an assassination attempt.

=== Morocco ===
In November 2020, the Polisario Front declared it had broken a 30-year truce and attacked Moroccan forces in Western Sahara as part of the Western Sahara conflict.

=== Mozambique ===
The insurgency in Cabo Delgado intensified with events such as the 2020 Mozambique attacks, the Mocímboa da Praia offensive in 2020 and the Battle of Palma in 2021.

=== Niger ===
The 2021 Nigerien coup attempt occurred on 31 March 2021 at around 3:00 am WAT (2:00 am UTC) after gunfire erupted in the streets of Niamey, the capital of Niger, two days before the inauguration of president-elect Mohamed Bazoum. The coup attempt was staged by elements within the military, and was attributed to an Air Force unit based in the area of the Niamey Airport. The alleged leader of the plot was Captain Sani Saley Gourouza, who was in charge of security at the unit's base. After the coup attempt was foiled, the perpetrators were arrested.

On 26 July 2023, a coup d'état occurred in Niger, during which the country's presidential guard removed and detained president Mohamed Bazoum. Subsequently, General Abdourahamane Tiani, the Commander of the Presidential Guard, proclaimed himself the leader of the country and established the National Council for the Safeguard of the Homeland, after confirming the success of the coup.

In response to this development, the Economic Community of West African States (ECOWAS) issued an ultimatum on 30 July, giving the coup leaders in Niger one week to reinstate Bazoum, with the threat of international sanctions and potential use of force. When the deadline of the ultimatum expired on 6 August, no military intervention was initiated; however, on 10 August, ECOWAS took the step of activating its standby force. Previously in 2017, ECOWAS had launched a military intervention to restore democracy in The Gambia during a constitutional crisis within the country.

All active member states of ECOWAS, except for Cape Verde, pledged to engage their armed forces in the event of an ECOWAS-led military intervention against the Nigerien junta. Conversely, the military juntas in Burkina Faso and Mali announced they would send troops in support of the junta were such a military intervention launched while forming a mutual defense pact.

On 24 February 2024, ECOWAS announced that it was lifting sanctions on Niger, purportedly for humanitarian purposes.

=== Nigeria ===
The End SARS movement protested the abuses committed by the Special Anti-Robbery Squad, but were met with violence which killed at least 12 people.

=== Somalia ===
On 14 April 2021, acting President Somalia Mohamed Abdullahi Mohamed signed a law which extended his mandate by two years. This was opposed by opposition leaders which called it "a threat to the stability, peace and unity" and by the international community. On 25 April 2021, soldiers - mainly from Hirshabelle - entered Mogadishu in response. Rebels seized northern part of the city clashing with pro-government forces in some neighborhoods. Pro-government soldiers attacked homes of former Somali president and opposition leader. By the end of the day government forces withdrew towards Villa Somalia. On 6 May 2021, soldiers agreed to withdraw from Mogadishu after series of talks with the Prime Minister, held by the opposition. The police were set to take control of the city.

The 2021 Somali political crisis was triggered after president Mohamed Abdullahi Mohamed's term ended on 8 February 2021. Political turmoil escalated, with anti-government protests occurring after the government's decision to delay the 2021 Somali presidential election. Tensions rose when heavy gunfire was reported during demonstrations on 19–20 February in Mogadishu. The protesters were aiming to stage protest rallies over the next weeks and call for the 2021 Somali presidential election to be scheduled as quick as possible to end the political crisis and turmoil.

On 27 December 2021, President Mohamed Abdullahi Mohamed announced the suspension of Prime Minister Mohammed Hussein Roble for suspected corruption, which was described by Roble as a coup attempt. The next day, hundreds of soldiers loyal to Roble armed with rocket grenades and machine guns encircled the presidential palace.

The 2021–2022 Somali political crisis was a major political crisis and turmoil within the Somali government after President Mohamed Abdullahi Mohamed's term ended on 8 February 2021. Parliamentary elections held during 2021, but were not completed during the year. Prime Minister Mohamed Hussein Roble opposed the president's decision, and called for him to step down. Following months of protests, a deal was struck in January 2022 to hold elections in February. After a delay, presidential elections were ultimately held in May which resulted in President Mohamed Abdullahi Mohamed losing his bid for reelection to Hassan Sheikh Mohamud.

Presidential elections were held in Somalia on 15 May 2022. The election was held indirectly and after the elections for the House of the People, which began on 1 November 2021 and ended on 13 April 2022.

After three rounds, involving 38 candidates, parliamentary officials counted more than 165 votes in favour of Hassan Sheikh Mohamud, more than the number required to defeat the incumbent president. He was declared president in a peaceful transition of power after the incumbent president conceded defeat and congratulated the victor. Celebratory gunfire rang out in parts of Mogadishu. The United Nations in Somalia welcomed the conclusion of the election, praising the “positive” nature of the electoral process and peaceful transfer of power.

=== South Africa ===
Former president Jacob Zuma was taken into custody after declining to testify at the Zondo Commission, an inquiry into allegations of corruption during his term as president from 2009 to 2018. The Constitutional Court reserved judgement on Zuma's application to rescind his sentence on 12 July 2021.

Riots and protests took place in South Africa from Friday, 9 July 2021 until Saturday, 17th July 2021, in response to the arrest of Zuma. The riots triggered wider rioting and looting fueled by job layoffs and economic inequality worsened by the COVID-19 pandemic. The unrest began in the province of KwaZulu-Natal on the evening of 9 July, and spread to the province of Gauteng on the evening of 11 July.

=== South Sudan ===
The South Sudanese Civil War ended with a negotiated peace treaty. In January 2020, the Community of Sant'Egidio mediated a Rome Peace Declaration between the SSOMA and the South Sudanese government. The most contentious issue delaying the formation of the unity government was whether South Sudan should keep 32 or return to 10 states. On 14 February 2020, Kiir announced South Sudan would return to 10 states in addition to three administrative areas of Abyei, Pibor, and Ruweng, and on 22 February Riek Machar was sworn in as first vice president for the creation of the unity government, ending the civil war. Disarmament campaigns led by the government has led to resistance, with clashes killing more than 100 people in two days in north-central Tonj in August 2020.

=== Sudan ===
In January 2020, progress was made in peace negotiations, in the areas of land, transitional justice and system of government issues via the Darfur track of negotiations. SRF and Sovereignty Council representatives agreed on the creation of a Special Court for Darfur to conduct investigations and trials for war crimes and crimes against humanity carried out during the War in Darfur by the al-Bashir presidency and by warlords. Two Areas negotiations with SPLM-N (al-Hilu) had progressed on six framework agreement points, after a two-week pause, but disagreement remained on SPLM-N (al-Hilu)'s requirement of a secular state in South Kordofan and Nuba Mountains and Blue Nile self-determination. On 24 January on the Two Areas track, political and security agreements, constituting a framework agreement, were signed by Hemetti on behalf of the Sovereignty Council and Ahmed El Omda Badi on behalf of SPLM-N (Agar). The agreements give legislative autonomy to South Kordofan and Blue Nile; propose solutions for the sharing of land and other resources, and aim to unify all militias and government soldiers into a single unified Sudanese military body.

On 26 January, a "final" peace agreement for the northern track, including issues of studies for new dams, compensation for people displaced by existing dams, road construction and burial of electronic and nuclear waste, was signed by Shamseldin Kabashi of the Sovereignty Council and Dahab Ibrahim of the Kush Movement.

In February 2020, a new unity government was announced, to govern the entire country, with the support of all sides of the conflict. As one part of the agreement, the current cabinet was disbanded, in order to enable more opposition members to be appointed to cabinet roles. In March 2020, negotiators and officials on both sides of the conflict attempted to work out arrangements to facilitate the appointment of civilian governors for various regions, in concert with ongoing peace efforts. The EU announced its support for the peace efforts and pledged to provide financial support of 100 million Euros.

The September 2021 Sudanese coup d'état attempt was a coup attempt against the Sovereignty Council of Sudan on Tuesday 21 September 2021. According to media reports, at least 40 officers were arrested at dawn on Tuesday 21 September 2021. A government spokesman said they included "remnants of the defunct regime", referring to former officials of President Omar al-Bashir's government, and members of the country's armoured corps.

On 25 October 2021, the Sudanese military, led by General Abdel Fattah al-Burhan, took control of the government in a military coup. At least five senior government figures were initially detained. Civilian Prime Minister Abdalla Hamdok refused to declare support for the coup and on 25 October called for popular resistance; he was moved to house arrest on 26 October. Some civilian groups including the Sudanese Professionals Association and Forces of Freedom and Change called for civil disobedience and refusal to cooperate with the coup organisers. Protests took place on 25 and 26 October against the coup and at least 10 civilians were reported as being killed and over 140 injured by the military during the first day of protests.

The junta later agreed to hand over authority to a civilian-led government, with a formal agreement scheduled to be signed on 6 April 2023. However, it was delayed due to tensions between generals Burhan and Dagalo, who serve as chairman and deputy chairman of the Transitional Sovereignty Council, respectively. Chief among their political disputes is the integration of the RSF into the military. One issue of contention is the RSF's insistence on a ten-year timetable for its integration into the regular army, while the regular army demands it be done in two years. Other contested issues included the status given to RSF officers in the future hierarchy, and whether RSF forces should be under the command of the army chief – rather than Sudan's commander-in-chief – who is currently Burhan. As a sign of their rift, Dagalo expressed regret over the October 2021 coup.

On 11 April 2023, RSF forces deployed near the city of Merowe and in Khartoum. Government forces ordered them to leave, but they refused, leading to clashes when RSF forces took control of the Soba military base south of Khartoum. On 15 April 2023, clashes broke out across Sudan, mainly in the capital city of Khartoum, between rival factions of the country's military government. The fighting began with attacks by the paramilitary Rapid Support Forces (RSF) on key government sites. Explosions and gunfire were reported across Khartoum. As of 15 April 2023, both RSF leader Mohamed Hamdan Dagalo and de facto leader Abdel Fattah al-Burhan claimed to control key government sites, including the general military headquarters, Sudan TV headquarters, the Presidential Palace, Khartoum International Airport, and the Army chief's official residence.

=== Tunisia ===
The 2021 Tunisian political crisis began on 25 July 2021, after Tunisian President Kais Saied dismissed Prime Minister Hichem Mechichi and suspended the activities of the Assembly of the Representatives of the People by invoking emergency powers from Article 80 of the Tunisian Constitution. The decisions of the president were made in response to a series of protests against Ennahda, economic hardship and spike in COVID-19 cases in Tunisia. The speaker of the Tunisian parliament and leader of the Ennahda Movement Rached Ghannouchi said the president's actions were an assault on democracy and called on his supporters to take to the streets in opposition.

On 24 August, Saied extended the suspension of parliament although the constitution states the parliament can only be suspended for a month, raising concerns in some quarters about the future of democracy in the country. On 22 September, President Saied issued a decree that grants him full presidential powers with the potential of the change of Tunisia's constitution, its transformation into a presidential republic and maybe even the dissolution of the parliament. Earlier that day, Seifeddine Makhlouf and Fayçal Tebbini, both members of parliament were jailed.

In October 2021, Saied appointed Najla Bouden Romdhane as the first female prime minister in Tunisia and the Arab world. On February 6, Kais Saied dissolved the country's top independent judiciary, a move that was condemned by the opposition as a power grab. On February 24, 2022, Saied announced that foreign funding for civil society organizations will be prohibited. He said, "Non-governmental organisations must be prevented from accessing external funds... and we will do that."

=== Uganda ===
Unrest killed at least 45 people after the arrest of opposition leader Bobi Wine in the runup to the 2021 Ugandan general election. In June 2021, four gunmen on a car opened fire against a convoy carrying Ugandan Minister of Transport Katumba Wamala, injuring him and killing his daughter and driver.

=== Zambia ===
In 2020, Zambia faced sovereign default as the first sub-Saharan African country since 2005 due to economic mismanagement by the government of Edgar Lungu, who had grown public debt from 32% to 120% and scared off investment by seizing mines. Debt servicing takes up four times more money from the budget than healthcare. Much of the money is believed to have been lost to corruption. The main opposition leader Hakainde Hichilema has been arrested. The electoral roll has been nulled and only 30 days have been given for re-registration. Comparisons have been drawn to neighbouring Zimbabwe.

Hakainde Hichilema (born 4 June 1962), often known by his initials HH and the nickname "Bally", is a Zambian businessman, farmer, and politician who is the seventh and current president of Zambia since 24 August 2021. As of 2026, he is the only person alive who has been president of Zambia.

Hichilema has led the United Party for National Development since 2006, following the death of party founder Anderson Mazoka. Prior to his election, he was a major opponent of Edgar Lungu, who was president from 2015 to 2021. On 11 April 2017, Hichilema was arrested and charged with treason, a move that was seen as an illegitimate act by Lungu to silence a political rival. The arrest and charge were widely condemned, with protests held in Zambia and abroad, demanding Hichilema's release and condemning the increasing authoritarianism of Lungu's regime. Hichilema was released from prison on 16 August 2017, and the charge of treason was dropped. After having contested five previous presidential elections, he won the 2021 presidential election and was re-elected to a second consecutive term in 2026.

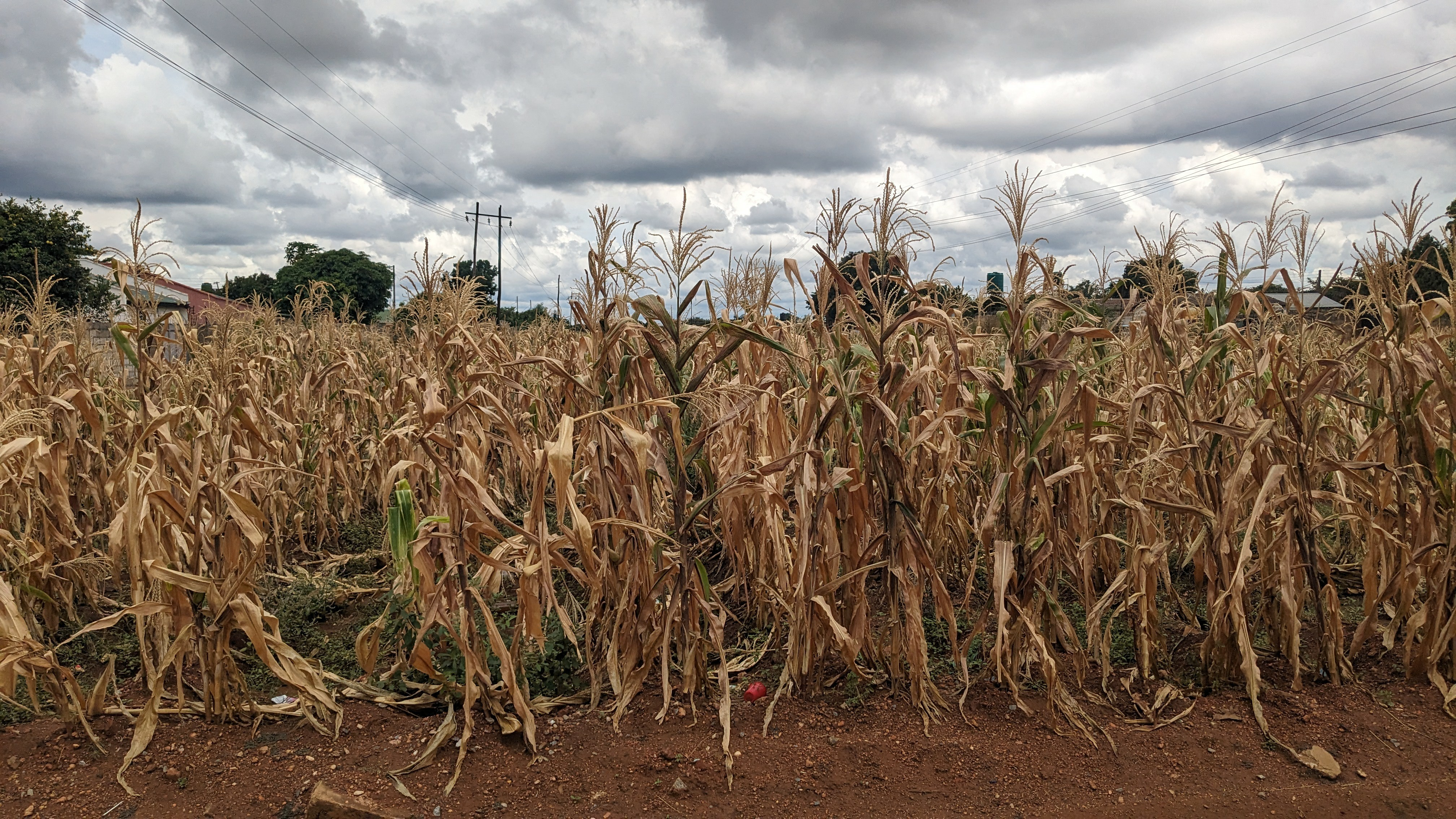

Starting in January 2024, most of Zambia began experiencing an ongoing drought, considered to be the worst to hit the country in at least two decades, leading to severe food shortages, water scarcity, and a national emergency declaration. The drought is affecting 84 of the 116 districts across Central, Copperbelt, Eastern, Lusaka, Northwestern, Southern, and Western provinces. Triggered by an El Niño-induced dry spell, the drought continues to have profound impacts on agriculture, water supply, and food security, affecting over a million children and households across the nation. Zambia's economy and food security is heavily dependent on rain-fed agriculture, making the country particularly vulnerable to changes in weather patterns. The 2023-2024 rainy season saw the influence of El Niño, leading to significantly reduced rainfall and the onset of severe drought conditions, which persist to the present day. On 29 February 2024, President Hakainde Hichilema declared the drought a national disaster.

=== Zimbabwe ===
In 2019, the new Finance Minister, Mthuli Ncube, presided over the conversion from foreign currency to a new Zimbabwean currency, and the resultant return of hyperinflation. It was estimated that inflation reached 500% during 2019. According to the website Trading Economics, the annual inflation rate in Zimbabwe was 540% in February 2020. The annual inflation rate had risen to 676% in March 2020, and there was a bleak economic outlook due to the effects of a drought in 2019 and the COVID-19 pandemic. In 2022, the country experienced another period of high inflation, which jumped to 131.7% in May from 96.4% in April. Since February 2022, Zimbabwe's inflation rate shot up from 66% to more than 130% in May 2022. By June 2022, it surged again to 191%. The same month, Finance minister Mthuli Ncube said the GVT would not hesitate to intervene to cushion against price increases and exchange rate volatility. In April 2024, a new currency was announced, the Zimbabwean ZiG.

The Zimbabwean dollar (sign: Z$; code: ZWL), also known as the Zimdollar or Real Time Gross Settlement (RTGS) dollar, was the currency of Zimbabwe from February 2019 to April 2024. It was the only legally permitted currency for trade in Zimbabwe from June 2019 to March 2020, after which foreign currencies were legalised again.

Due to the sharp depreciation of the Zimdollar, beginning almost immediately after its introduction, where possible, most transactions were being done in hard currencies, such as the U.S. dollar, despite their illegality until March 2020. On 5 April 2024, it was announced that the Zimdollar would be replaced by the new Zimbabwe Gold (ZiG), a gold-backed currency, starting on 8 April. On 31 August 2024, the Zimbabwean dollar (ZWL) was officially retired.

== See also ==
- 2020s in political history
