= Thomas Awah =

Cameroonian journalist

Thomas Awah or Thomas Awah, Jr. is an activist and journalist from Cameroon born in 1969. Awah was arrested in 2017 and sentenced to 11 years imprisonment on charges of terrorism, spreading false news, hostility to the fatherland, secession, insurrection and revolution.

== Activism ==
Awah is a journalist and a former correspondent for Equinoxe TV and Afrik 2 Radio. He is openly affiliated with the Cameroon Anglophone Movement (CAM), which advocates for Anglophone self-determinism, and has taken part in Angolophone protests as well as reported on them as a journalist.

== Arrest and Sentence ==
Awah was arrested during a "Ghost Town" demonstration, when Anglophone residents closed their businesses as a form of protest. Awah was hoping to interview residents of Bamenda City for Afrik 2 Radio, when he was stopped by officers and arrested in possession of documents from the secessionist Southern Cameroons National Council (SCNC).

The SCNC was banned by the government weeks later, claiming they put the state's security at risk. After he was arrested, Awah was interrogated about the Anglophone movement and sent to Kondengui Central Prison to be held in pre-trial detention.

Awah was tried alongside eight other detainees linked to the Anglophone movement. Since being convicted, Awah has been returned to the Kondengui Central Prison in Yaoundé, and suffers from tuberculosis, toxoplasmosis, and pneumonia, which have been worsened by the conditions of his imprisonment.

== International Response ==
The international human rights organization Freedom Now and the law firm Dechert LLP filed a petition with the UN Working Group on Arbitrary Detention on Awah's behalf in October 2020.
