= Kenya–Lesotho relations =

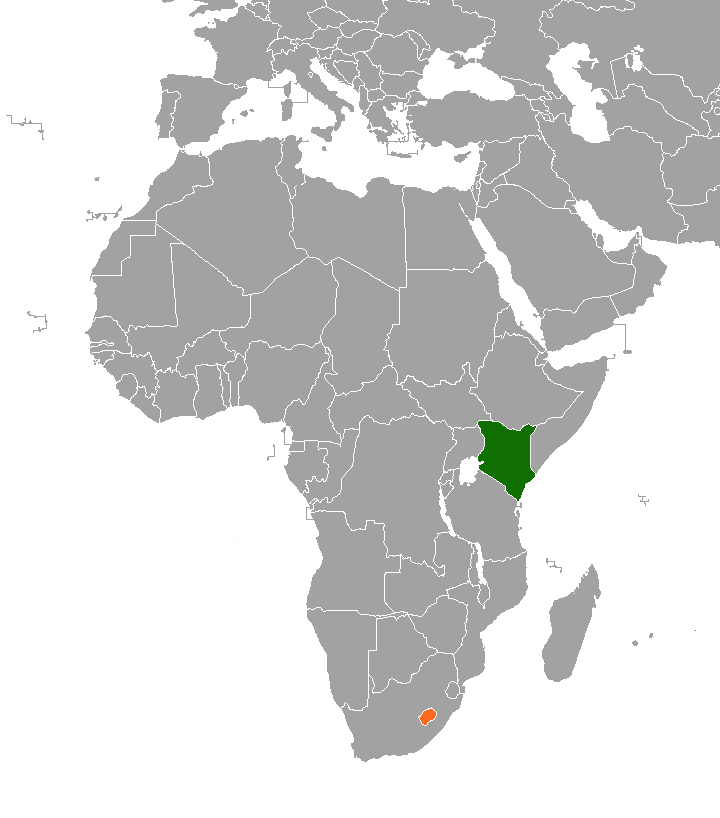
- Kenya: Lesotho

Kenya–Lesotho relations are bilateral relations between Kenya and Lesotho. Both countries are member states of the Commonwealth of Nations and African Union

== History ==
In late 2019 Prime Minister Thabane made a state visit to Kenya. He met and held talks with President Kenyatta. They oversaw the signing of three agreements.

Thabane's visit came as a result of the leader seeking to improve relations between the two African nations. Relations are described as cordial, although there is little trade or exchanges between them.

Prime Minister Thabane was also the first PM to make a state visit to Kenya.

== Agreements and MOUs ==
The three agreements signed by both governments on Thabane's 2019 visit to Nairobi include:

- Joint Commission for Cooperation (JCC)
- Memorandum of Understanding for Bilateral consultations
- Memorandum of Understanding in Sports

=== Purpose of Agreements and MOUs ===
- The JCC will help with identification of key areas of cooperation
- MOU for Bilateral consultations will enable consultations between both countries on bilateral and multilateral matters
- MOU in Sports will be key in nurturing sports talent in both countries

== Diplomatic missions ==
Prime Minister Thabane recalled that there used to be a mission in Nairobi and he talked about both countries reestablishing missions in Maseru and Nairobi.
