= 2021 in Lesotho =

- Decades: 2000s; 2010s; 2020s
- See also: Other events of 2021; List of years in Lesotho

Events in the year 2021 in Lesotho.

== Incumbents ==
- King: Letsie III
- Prime Minister: Moeketsi Majoro

== Events ==
Ongoing — COVID-19 pandemic in Lesotho

== Deaths ==
- 20 January – Justin Lekhanya, politician, former Chairman of the Military Council (born 1938); diabetes.
- 17 April – Sebastian Koto Khoarai, cardinal, former Bishop of Mohale's Hoek (born 1929).
- 15 July – Tsepo Tshola, musician and member of Sankomota (born 1953 or 1954); COVID-19.
