= 2015 in Lesotho =

- Decades: 1990s; 2000s; 2010s; 2020s
- See also: Other events of 2015; List of years in Lesotho

The following lists events that happened during 2015 in the Kingdom of Lesotho.

== Incumbents ==
- King: Letsie III
- Prime Minister: Tom Thabane (until March 30), Pakalitha Mosisili (starting March 30)

== Events ==
=== February ===
- February 2 - A shootout between the Lesotho Defence Force and two former bodyguards of Prime Minister Tom Thabane, leaves one bystander killed and three wounded.
- February 28 - Early general elections will be held following mediation in the aftermath of the 2014 political crisis.
