= 2022 in Lesotho =

- Decades: 2000s; 2010s; 2020s
- See also: Other events of 2022; List of years in Lesotho

Events in the year 2022 in Lesotho.

== Incumbents ==
- King: Letsie III
- Prime Minister: Moeketsi Majoro (until 28 October), Sam Matekane (starting 28 October)

== Events ==
Ongoing — COVID-19 pandemic in Lesotho

7 October – 2022 Lesotho general election: Citizens in Lesotho elect the 120 members of the National Assembly.

10 October – The Revolution for Prosperity party wins the election by a small margin and falling short of controlling the National Assembly.

11 October – The Revolution for Prosperity party forms a majority coalition with the Alliance of Democrats and Movement for Economic Change, says RFP leader Sam Matekane.

== Sports ==
- 18 June - 3 July: Lesotho at the 2022 Commonwealth Games
- 15 July - 24 July: Lesotho at the 2022 World Athletics Championships
- 28 July - 8 August: Lesotho at the 2022 Commonwealth Games
