= Cameroon Anglophone Civil Society Consortium =

Anglophone Cameroonian federalist movement

- Logo of CACSC
- Leader: Felix Agbor Balla
- Ideology: Federalism; Anglophone interests

The Cameroon Anglophone Civil Society Consortium (CACSC) is an Anglophone Cameroonian federalist movement.

== History ==
CACSC consisted of lawyers and teacher trade unions in Southern Cameroons. They opposed what they saw as threats against the language and common law system in the Anglophone regions, particularly the use of French in schools and courtrooms. On October 6, 2016, the organization started a sit-down strike, which was supported by peaceful protests in cities such as Limbe, Buea and Bamenda. This initiated the 2016–2017 Cameroonian protests. The government responded violently; within a week, more than 100 demonstrators and activists had been arrested, and six were reported dead.

In January 2017, the Cameroonian government created a committee to enter a dialogue with members of the CACSC led by Tassang Tilfred. At the first meeting, the CACSC refused to talk until the government released all activists who had been arrested. This was followed by more arrests, drawing condemnation from Consortium members. CACSC presented a draft proposal for a federal state, with autonomy for the Anglophone regions. As a response, on January 17, CACSC and the Southern Cameroons National Council were branded as threats to the unity of Cameroon and banned through a ministerial decree signed by minister René Sadi. A few days later, CACSC leaders Agbor Balla and Fontem Neba were arrested.

In the end, members of CACSC spent months in detention, while others fled the country and came to support complete separation of the Anglophone regions from Cameroon. With the outbreak of the war known as the Anglophone Crisis in September 2017, federalism lost support among Anglophone activists. In May 2019, the Cameroonian government announced it was ready to discuss federalism.
