= 2023 in Lesotho =

- Decades: 2000s; 2010s; 2020s
- See also: Other events of 2023; List of years in Lesotho

Events in the year 2023 in Lesotho.

== Incumbents ==
- King: Letsie III
- Prime Minister: Sam Matekane

== Events ==
Ongoing — COVID-19 pandemic in Lesotho

29 March – Lesotho's parliament debates a motion to claim portions of South Africa, including Free State.
