= Fontem Neba =

Cameroonian dissident, university lecturer and author

Dr. Fontem A. Neba
- Born: Fontem Aforteka’a Neba; 1970s Northwest Region (Cameroon)
- Education: University of Calabar, University of Ibadan (PhD)
- Occupations: Lecturer, author
- Organization: All Southern Cameroons People's Conference
- Known for: Cameroon Anglophone Civil Society Consortium (CACSC)
- Notable work: Modes of Language acquisition and Proficiency (Kansas, USA), English Language Mastery and Academic Success
- Movement: Cameroon Anglophone Civil Society Consortium (CACSC)

Dr. Fontem A. Neba (born Fontem Aforteka’a Neba, in 1970) is an Anglophone Cameroonian university lecturer, author and a civil rights activist who emerged on the Cameroon political stage as the founding Secretary General of Cameroon Anglophone Civil Society Consortium before it was banned by the government of Cameroon on January 17, 2017. He was arrested on the same day alongside Barrister Nkongho Felix Agbor and deported to Yaoundé overnight where they would both spend nine perilous months in the Kondengui Maximum security prison. Before becoming Secretary General of the banned Cameroon Anglophone Civil Society Consortium (CACSC), he was the Secretary General of University Lecturers’ trade union of the University of Buea (SYNES) before his arrest on January 17, 2017, for staging a peaceful protest in the defence of Anglophone Cameroon common law system of education. He is the author of English Language Mastery and Academic Success which was launched on June 18, 2015.

== Early life and career ==
Dr. Fontem Aforteka'a Neba was born on August 8, 1970. He holds a PhD from the University of Ibadan in Nigeria. He is a linguist, lecturer, author and an activist. He is the author of English Language Mastery and Academic Success. He was the Secretary General of teachers’ trade union of the University of Buea (SYNES) before his arrest on January 17, 2017 and the Secretary General of the banned Cameroon Anglophone Civil Society Consortium (CACSC).

== Arrest ==
On January 17, 2017, at about 6:15 pm, it was reported that Dr. Fontem Neba was arrested alongside Barrister Agbor Balla, Ayah Paul Abine in Buea by a combined squad of police, gendarmes, elements of the military intelligence unit and the dreaded secret service unit known by its French Acronym as DGR. The arrest immediately followed the banning of the Consortium which had waged a civil disobedience campaign to protest grave marginalization and systemic assimilation of the English speaking minority in Cameroon by the majority Francophones.

== Court charges and trial of Dr. Fontem Neba ==
Dr.Fontem Neba and Co, were charged with 8 counts by the Cameroon Military tribunals in Yaounde for treason, terrorism, civil unrest, jeopardizing the peace and unity of the Republic of Cameroon and if found guilty would have faced the death penalty. On March 23 the Neba Fondem trial at the Yaounde military court tribunal was adjourned for another hearing on April 27, May 24 and July 27 same year and on the August 31 through a presidential decree by president Paul Biya. Neba and friends were released and all charges against them were cancelled. While in prison, Fontem Neba spoke to the French daily le Jour Newspaper during the visit of members of the Social Democratic Front (Cameroon) (SDF) parliamentary group on April 7, 2017, he said

"There is so much to be said about the current anglophone crisis .You must know that the crisis that persists is linked to the bad will of the leaders of this country. Negotiations between the Government and the unions of English-speaking teachers had commenced. I must quickly say that the strike had taken another turn and the population followed closely all our actions; it was no longer possible to circumvent them."

== See also ==
- 2016–2017 Cameroonian protests
