= Setsoto Stadium =

Sports venue in Maseru, Lesotho

Coordinates: 29°18′39.51″S 27°30′4.82″E

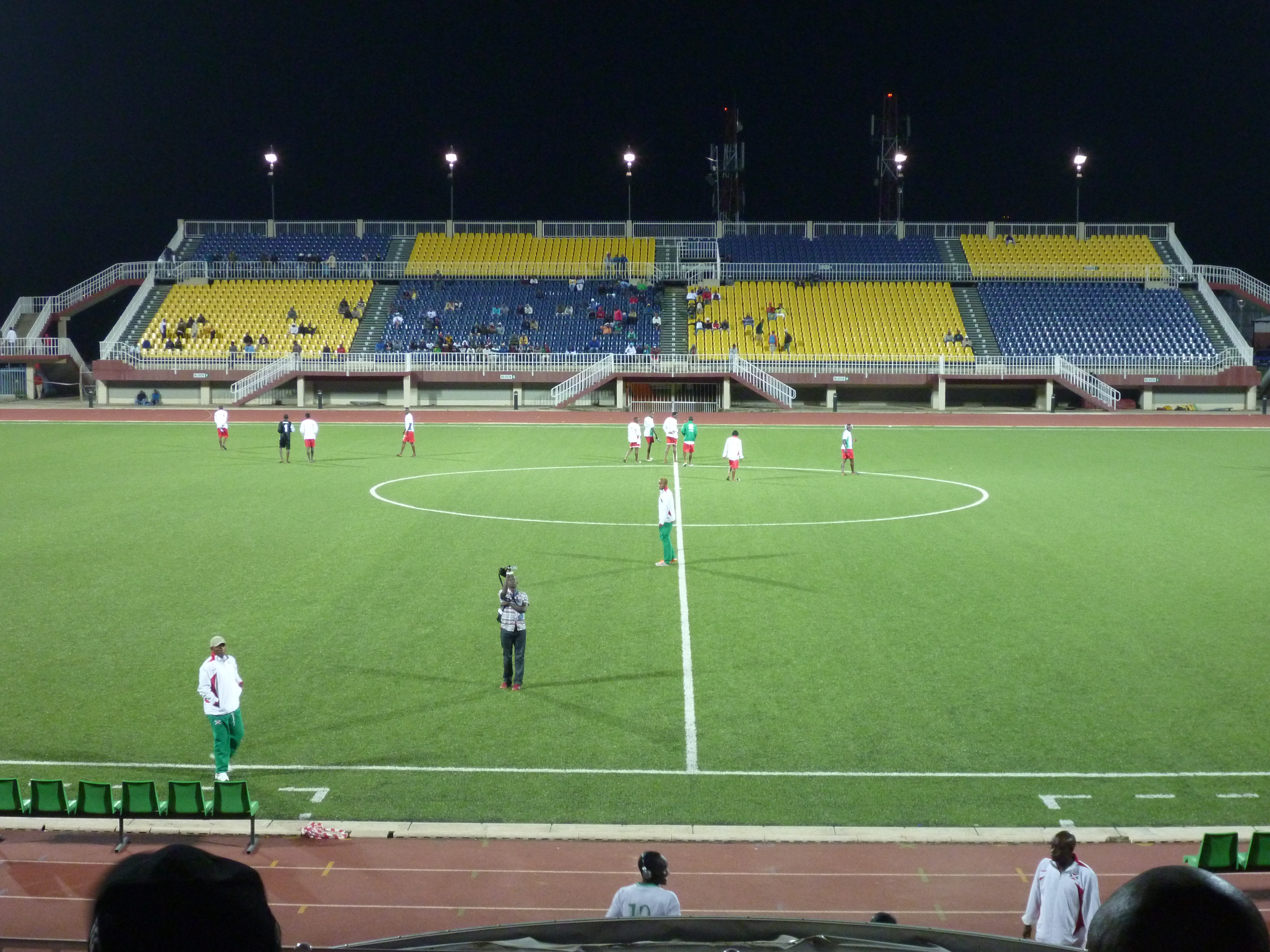
- Interactive map of Setsoto Stadium
- Location: Maseru, Lesotho
- Capacity: 13,900
- Surface: Artificial Turf

Construction
- Renovated: 2010-2011

The Setsoto Stadium is a multi-purpose stadium in Maseru, Lesotho. It is currently used mostly for football matches. The stadium has a capacity of 13,900. It was the home ground of the Lesotho national football team prior to FIFA condemning the stadium in 2021, forcing the national team to play its home games outside of the country. It had previously been renovated and enlarged in 2010–2011.

In June 2024, renovations were halted due to a lack of funds, and the costs increasing from M20 million to M70 million.

In February 2025, the stadium was still in a state of disrepair.

In April 2025, the government announced a plan to renovate the stadium and increase the capacity to 25,000, at a cost of M85 million. Renovations were scheduled for completion by October 2026.

The stadium hosted its first top-flight match in many years in March 2026.

In August 2017, the stadium served as the venue for the wedding ceremony between former Lesotho Prime Minister Tom Thabane and Maesiah Thabane.
