= Dominic Motikoe =

Mosotho politician

Dominic Motikoe was a Basotho politician who led the National Independent Party (NIP) and served as a Member of Parliament in the National Assembly of Lesotho until his death in 2009.

== Life and career ==
Motikoe was elected to the National Assembly through proportional representation in the 2002 parliamentary election as the second candidate on the NIP's candidate list, after Anthony Manyeli. He was the party's deputy leader under Manyeli. After Manyeli rejected an offer of alliance from the governing Lesotho Congress for Democracy (LCD) in November 2006, the LCD instead formed an alliance with Motikoe. Objecting to this, Manyeli took the matter to the High Court of Lesotho; although it ruled in his favor, the Court of Appeal subsequently reversed the High Court's decision.

It was Motikoe, not Manyeli, who selected the NIP's candidates for the February 2007 parliamentary election, meaning that the 21 NIP candidates who won seats were all supportive of Motikoe's alliance with the LCD. The dispute over control of the NIP contributed to an extended dispute regarding the outcome of the 2007 election and the LCD's subsequent control of the National Assembly, which was crucially bolstered by the presence of Motikoe's 21 MPs. Opposition parties wanted those MPs to be replaced by new MPs selected by Manyeli, which would have reduced the LCD's majority to only one seat. Despite Motikoe's support for the government, he was officially designated as the Leader of the Opposition; Tom Thabane of the opposition All Basotho Convention (ABC) was thus denied that title, despite the opposition's objections.

Motikoe was shot death in Maputsoe on 26 April 2009. According to police, he had "dropped off his female colleague at her home" when her husband, suspecting that Motikoe had been sleeping with his wife, emerged from the home and opened fire, killing Motikoe.
