= Felix Agbor Balla =

Cameroonian lawyer

Agbor Nkongho
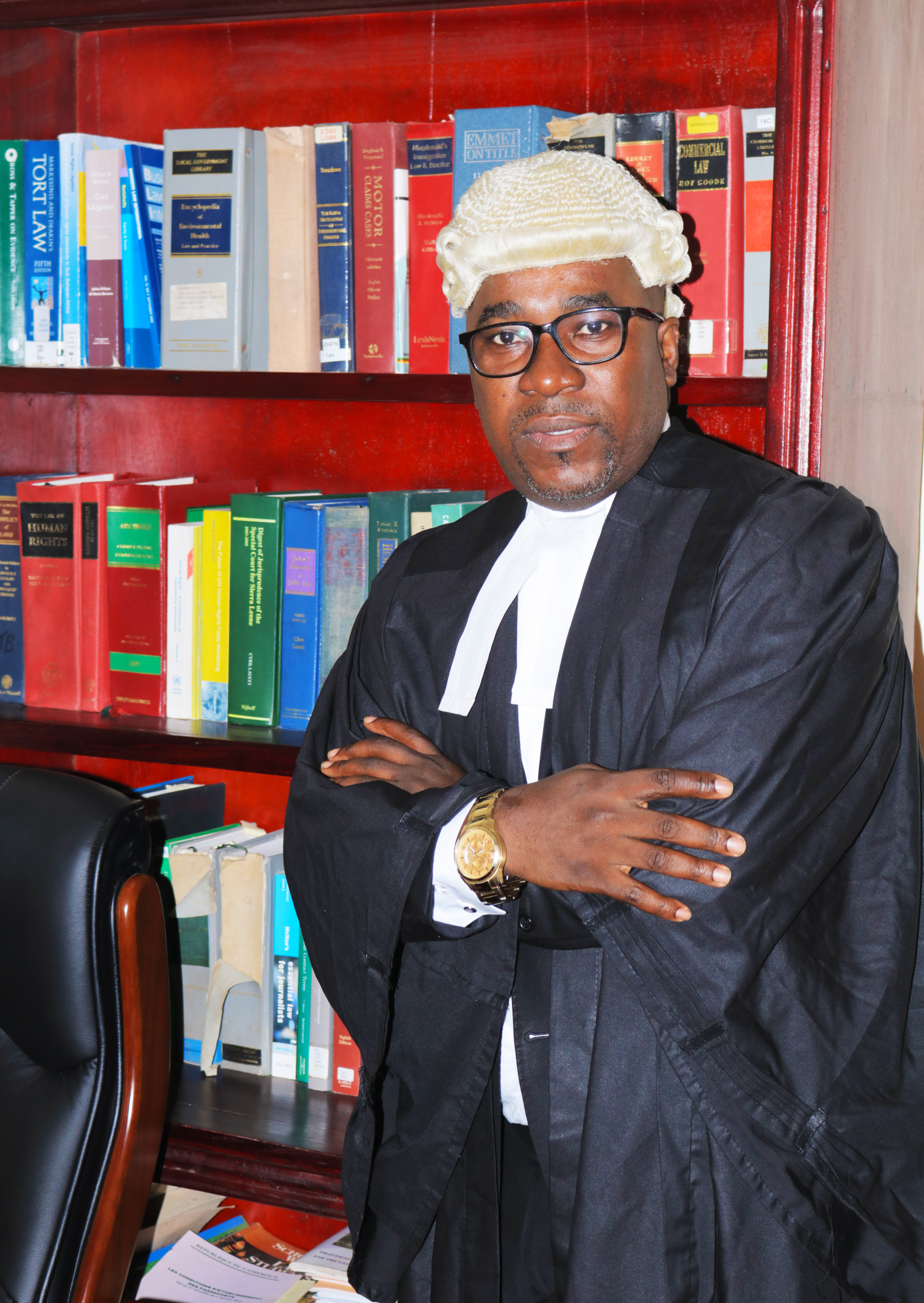
- Born: Felix Agbor Anyior Nkongho; August 23, 1970 (age 55); Kumba, Southwest Region, Cameroon
- Other name: Balla
- Citizenship: Cameroonian
- Education: Saint Joseph's College, Sasse; CCAS Kumba; University of Yaoundé I; Nigerian Law School; Free University of Brussels; University of Notre Dame; Leipzig University
- Occupations: Activist, Human rights lawyer, freedom fighter.
- Organization(s): Centre for Human Rights and Democracy in Africa
- Known for: Political activism, Nonviolent Resistance
- Movement: Cameroon Anglophone Civil Society Consortium (CACSC)

Agbor Nkongho aka Balla (born Felix Agbor Anyior Nkongho) is an Anglophone Cameroonian human rights lawyer who is the president of the Fako Lawyers Association, vice president of the African Bar Association in charge of Central Africa, founder and chairman of the Centre for Human Rights and Democracy in Africa and founder of Agbor Nkongho Law Firm an activist and freedom fighter who was arrested on 17 January 2017. Agbor Nkongho was born on August 23, 1970. He is a leading member of the Cameroon Anglophone Civil Society Consortium (CACSC) which has been banned and its activities declared illegal in Cameroon.

== Early life and career ==
Agbor Nkongho is a native from Manyu division, Southwest Region, Cameroon. Popularly known as Agbor-Balla in the ghettos of Great Soppo, Buea where he grew up. He attended CBC Primary School Great Soppo Buea, before moving to Saint Joseph's College, Sasse, Buea where he passed the GCE Ordinary Levels in Form Four which was one class before the final year of secondary studies. He went to CCAS Kumba and then to the Musole GCE Evening Classes after he was wrongfully dismissed from CCAS Kumba for subversive writing popularly known as “Lavoir” which challenged was an article challenging abuses and wrong actions by school administrators, this marked his start of activism in his youthful days. Agbor Nkongho described his dismissal as a blessing in an interview, because it got him a meeting with Bate Besong, renowned Anglophone playwright, poet and critic. He studied at the University of Yaoundé I and graduated with (LLB in English Private Law). He also studied at the Nigerian Law School, the Free University of Brussels, the University of Notre Dame and Leipzig University. He worked as a researcher at the Centre for International Law in Belgium, as an assistant legal officer at Sierra Leone International Criminal Court, a human right officer at United Nations office in Afghanistan, and Congo.

== Arrest ==
On 17 January 2017, it was reported that Balla had been arrested with Fontem Neba who is a university lecturer in Buea by Cameroon’s police ordered by the government. He was arrested in connection with the Anglophone problem after organizing peaceful protests to protect the culture and rights of the Anglophone Cameroonians in the form of sit down strikes with more than 2000 Anglophone lawyers, Ghost town and shutdown of schools under the banner of the Anglophone Civil Society Consortium (CACSC), which was banned and its activities declared illegal few days before his arrest.

== Charges and military court trial ==
It was reported by multiple sources that Balla and others were charged on eight counts and may face a death penalty for treason, terrorism, civil unrest, jeopardising the peace and unity of the Republic of Cameroon. Balla's trial was to begin on 1 February 2017 and later rescheduled for 13 February. On 23 March, Balla's trial at the Yaounde military court tribunal was adjourned for another hearing on 27 April, and then on 24 May and then 27 July. On 31 August, President Paul Biya issued a presidential decree ordering the Yaounde military court tribunal to release Balla and others in connection with the protest in Northwest and Southwest regions of the country. On 15 April 2015, according to an interview, Balla told journalists in Buea, "I am ready to die in defense of Common Law".

== Reaction of international bodies ==
The Law Society of Upper Canada reacted immediately to the arrest and detention of Balla and appealed to the Government of Cameroon to immediately and unconditionally release Balla and to respect the full functions of the lawyer professions without any intimidation. On 27 March 2017, the Robert F. Kennedy Human Rights organisation urged the Government of Cameroon to immediately release Balla and to drop the charges against him. Professor Sean O’Brien, director for International Human Right Law, who taught Balla at the University of Notre Dame, filed a petition to the United Nations Human Rights Council for the immediate release of Balla.

== Release of Agbor Nkongho ==
On 30 August 2017, through a presidential decree, Balla, Neba Fontem and Paul Abine Ayah were released and all charges against them dropped. Amnesty International deputy regional director for West and Central Africa said that the decision by the government of Cameroon to release Balla and others was good news for everyone and condemned their arrest in the first place. Agbor Balla continues with his activities for the freedom of southern Cameroons. This has been done via the creation of Tasks Forces to liberate many in jail and He still continues to press on the government of La Republique du Cameroun to liberate all.

By his political ideology, he is a believer of a two state federation of equal status in Cameroon as a solution to resolve the Anglophone crisis. A position he has maintained for over 17 years of his endeavours in the fight for the liberation of the Anglophone community in Cameroon. [TheOverseer.com]

== See also ==
- Anglophone problem (Cameroon)
- 2016–2017 Cameroonian protests
