= 2025 in Lesotho =

- Decades: 2000s; 2010s; 2020s
- See also: Other events of 2025; List of years in Lesotho

The following events occurred in Lesotho in the year 2025.

== Incumbents ==
- King: Letsie III
- Prime Minister: Sam Matekane

== Events ==
- 2 April – The United States imposes a 50% tariff on imports from Lesotho.
- 28 May – The US-funded Sustainable Transformation of Enterprises in the Poultry Sector (STEPS) project shuts down.
- 21 June – A bus heading from Maputsoe to Maseru crashes into a pile-up of vehicles, killing 11 people and injuring 12 others.
- 10 July – The government declares a two-year national state of disaster due to rising unemployment attributed to US tariffs.
- 16 September – 1,600 villagers in Mokhotlong file a complaint with the African Development Bank over damage and relocations linked to the Lesotho Highlands Water Project.

== Holidays ==
- January 1 – New Year's Day
- March 11 – Moshoeshoe's Day
- April 18 – Good Friday
- April 21 – Easter Monday
- May 1 – Workers' Day
- May 25 – Africa Day
- May 29 – Ascension Day
- July 17 – King's Birthday
- October 4 – Independence Day
- December 25 – Christmas Day
- December 26 – Boxing Day
