= Anglophone problem =

Cameroonian tension along linguistic lines

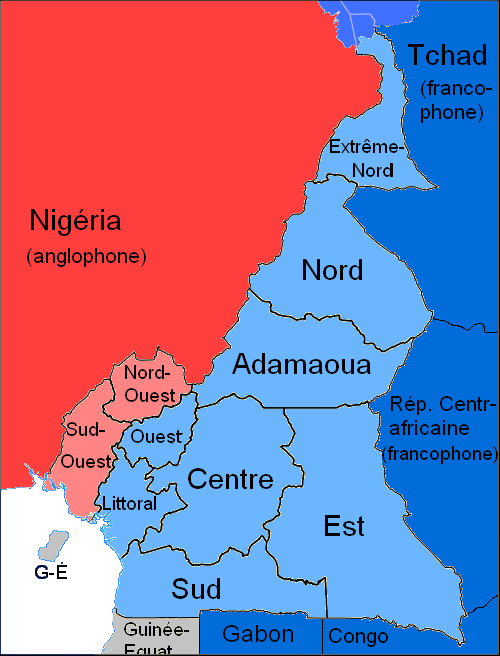
Map of French (blue) and English (red) as official regional languages of Cameroon and adjacent countries. The proportion of Anglophone Cameroonians is currently at around 16%, down from 21% in 1976

The Anglophone problem (French: problème anglophone) is a socio-political issue in the modern Republic of Cameroon, rooted in the country's German, British, and French colonial legacies. Anglophone (English-speaking) Cameroonians form a minority population of around 16 percent, mainly from the Northwest and Southwest regions that formerly constituted the Southern Cameroons, part of the former British Cameroon colonies. These Anglophone regions were formerly controlled by Britain as a mandate of the League of Nations, and then as a United Nations trust territory. During the Foumban Conference of 1961, territories with different colonial legacies were finally united into one state.

The issue arises from Anglophone opposition to certain policies and actions of the mainly Francophone (French-speaking) Government of Cameroon, particularly around the bilingual federation agreed to in 1961 and later rescinded in 1972, which has resulted in marginalization and discrimination. It is increasingly dominating the national political agenda, and has led to arguments and actions for federalism by Anglophones, a separatist movement to form an independent state of Ambazonia, and an ongoing armed conflict since 2017 which constitutes the Anglophone Crisis.

== Origins ==
=== European colonization ===
The origin can be traced back to World War I, when Cameroon was known as the German colony of Kamerun. Germany first gained influence in Cameroon in 1845 when Alfred Saker of the Baptist Missionary Society introduced a mission station. In 1860, German merchants established a factory: the Woermann Company. On 5 July 1884 local tribes provided the Woermann Company with rights to control the Kamerun River (the delta of the Wouri River), consequently setting the foundation for the later German colonization of Kamerun.

In 1916, during World War I, the empires of France and Britain joined forces in the Kamerun campaign to conquer the colony. Later, the Treaty of Versailles awarded France and Britain mandates over Cameroon as reparations after Germany lost the war. Over 430,000 km^{2} (167,000 sq mi) of German Kamerun was given to the French, while Britain was given a much smaller portion consisting of the Northern Cameroons, about 45,000 km^{2} (17,500 sq mi), and Southern Cameroons, 42,900 km^{2} (16,580 sq mi). Each colonizer would later influence the colonies with their European languages and cultures, creating both Anglophones and Francophones in Cameroon. The large difference in awarded territory resulted in present-day Cameroon having a majority Francophone population and a minority Anglophone population.

=== Gaining independence ===
Following World War II, a wave of independence flowed rapidly throughout Africa. The United Nations forced Britain and France to relinquish their colonies and guide them towards independence. British Southern Cameroons had the political option to either unite with Nigeria or with French Cameroun, but none for self-determination through becoming independence was given. The most desired option was independence with the least popular being unification with French Cameroon. However, during the British Plebiscite of 1961, the British argued that Southern Cameroons was not economically viable enough to sustain itself as an independent nation and could only survive by joining with Nigeria or La République du Cameroun (the Republic of Cameroon). The United Nations rejected Southern Cameroons' appeal to have independence as a sovereign nation on the ballot. The plebiscite questions were:

1. Do you wish to achieve independence by joining the independent Federation of Nigeria?
2. Do you wish to achieve independence by joining the independent Republic of Cameroun?

In February 1961, British Northern Cameroons voted to join Nigeria, while British Southern Cameroons voted to join La République du Cameroun.

=== The Foumban Conference of 17–21 July 1961 ===
The Foumban Constitutional Conference was held to create a constitution for the new Federal state of British Southern Cameroon and La République du Cameroun. The conference brought together representatives from La République du Cameroun, including President Amadou Ahidjo, and representatives from Southern Cameroons. Two weeks before the Foumban Conference, there were reports that more than 100 people were killed by terrorists in Loum, Bafang, Ndom, and Douala. The reports worried unification advocates who wanted British Cameroon to unify with French Cameroun. The location of Foumban had been carefully chosen to make Ahidjo appear as if he had everything under control. Mr. Mbile, a Southern Cameroonian representative at the conference, noted, "Free from all the unrest that had scared Southern Cameroonians, the Francophone authorities had picked the place deliberately for the occasion. The entire town had been exquisitely cleaned up and houses splashed with whitewash. Food was good and receptions lavish. The climate in Foumban real or artificial went far to convince us that despite the stories of 'murder and fire,' there could be at least this island of peace, east of the Mungo."

Before the Foumban Conference, all parties in Southern Cameroons, the Native Authority Councils and traditional leaders attended the Bamenda Conference to decide on a common proposal to present during negotiations with La République du Cameroun. The Bamenda Conference agreed on a non-centralized federation to ensure a distinction between the powers of the states and the powers of the federation. However, most of these proposals were ignored by Ahidjo. Some of these proposals included having a bicameral legislature and decentralizing power, but instead a unicameral system was established with a centralized system of power.

At the Foumban conference, Ahidjo presented delegates with a draft constitution. By the end of the conference, instead of creating an entirely new constitution, the contributions of the Southern Cameroons delegates were reflected in suggestions made to the draft initially presented to them. John Ngu Foncha and Ahidjo intended for the conference to be brief; however, delegates left the three-day conference with the impression that there would be sequential conferences to continue drafting the constitution. Mbile later noted, "We may have done more if we had spent five months instead of five days in writing our constitution at Foumban." The Constitution for the new Federal Republic was agreed in Yaoundé in August 1961, between Ahidjo and Foncha, pending approval by the House of Assembly of the two states. In the end, the West Cameroon House of Assembly never ratified the Constitution. However, on 1 October 1961, the Federal Republic of Cameroon nevertheless came into existence.

On 6 May 1972, Ahidjo announced his decision to convert the Federal Republic into a unitary state, provided that the idea was supported via referendum. This suggestion violated articles in the Foumban document which stated that: 'any proposal for the revision of the present constitution, which impairs the unity and integrity of the Federation shall be inadmissible,' and 'proposals for revision shall be adopted by simple majority vote of the members of the Federal Assembly, provided that such majority includes a majority of the representatives ... of each of the Federated States,' not through referendum. Despite these violations, the referendum passed, turning the Federal Republic into the United Republic of Cameroon. In 1984, Ahidjo's successor, Paul Biya, replaced the name "United Republic of Cameroon" with "La République du Cameroun", the same name the francophone Cameroon had before federation talks. With changes in the Constitution of 1996, reference to the existence of a territory called the British Southern Cameroons that had a "functioning self-government and recognized international boundaries" was essentially erased. These actions suggest that the Francophone's intentions may not have been to form a federal state, but rather to annex Southern Cameroons and not treat them as equals.

== Anglophone problem ==
Despite the non-acknowledgement or denial of the Anglophone problem from Francophone government leaders, there exists a discontent by Anglophones, both young and old, as to how Anglophones are treated. This discontent presents itself in calls for federation, and active separatist movements. At the core of Anglophone grievances is the loss of the former West Cameroon as a "distinct community defined by differences in official language and inherited colonial traditions of education, law, and public administration." On 22 December 2016, in a letter to Paul Biya, the Anglophone Archbishops of Southern Cameroons define the Anglophone problem as follows:

1. The failure of successive governments of Cameroon, since 1961, to respect and implement the articles of the Constitution that uphold and safeguard what British Southern Cameroons brought along to the Union in 1961.
2. The flagrant disregard for the Constitution, demonstrated by the dissolution of political parties and the formation of one political party in 1966, the sacking of Jua and the appointment of Muna in 1968 as the Prime Minister of West Cameroon, and other such acts judged by West Cameroonians to be unconstitutional and undemocratic.
3. The cavalier management of the 1972 Referendum which took out the foundational element (Federalism) of the 1961 Constitution.
4. The 1984 Law amending the Constitution, which gave the country the original East Cameroon name (The Republic of Cameroon) and thereby erased the identity of the West Cameroonians from the original union. West Cameroon, which had entered the union as an equal partner, effectively ceased to exist.
5. The deliberate and systematic erosion of the West Cameroon cultural identity which the 1961 Constitution sought to preserve and protect by providing for a bi-cultural federation.

=== Separation ===
Movements that advocate the separation of an English-speaking Cameroon are led by the Cameroon Action Group, the Southern Cameroons Youth League, the Southern Cameroons National Council, the Southern Cameroon Peoples Organization and the Ambazonia Movement.

=== Federation ===
Advocates of Federation want a return to the constitution agreed upon in the 1961 Foumban Conference that acknowledges the history and culture of the two regions while giving equal power to the two. This federation was dismantled in 1972 by the larger French-speaking Cameroon, which extended its executive power throughout West Cameroon. Federation advocates include the instrumental Consortium of the leaders of three Cameroon-based trade unions for lawyers, teachers, and transporters. It also includes some Cameroonians in the diaspora led by a well-organized US-based Anglophone Action Group (AAG). AAG was one of the first groups in the diaspora to endorse the Cameroon-based Consortium as a peaceful alternative to achieving a return to the pre-1972 federated system. Opponents of federation include the ruling Cameroon Peoples Democratic Movement (CPDM).

=== Unitarianism ===
Unitarianists do not want federation or separation, but advocate for a more decentralized unitary government, perceiving that the government is highly centralized in power. They argue that this centralization violates the tenets of the 1996 constitution, as decentralization has yet to be implemented.

== Struggle for political representation ==
In March 1990, the Social Democratic Front (SDF), led by John Fru Ndi, was founded on the perception of widespread Anglophone alienation. The SDF was the first major opposition party to the ruling Cameroon People's Democratic Movement.

== Symptoms of Anglophone discontent ==
There are many reasons Anglophones feel marginalized, systemically, by the government. National entrance examinations into some professional schools are set by the French system of education, or are set in French language only, even in English-speaking regions. This makes it difficult for Anglophones and Francophones to compete on an equal playing field. The examination board members are all Francophone, which places some bias against Anglophone candidates. There are five ministries that concern education and none of them are headed by an Anglophone; of the 36 ministers who defended the budgets for the ministries in 2016, only one was Anglophone.

State institutions only publish documents and public notices in French, without English translations. Most heads of government, senior administrators, and officials speak only French, even in English-speaking regions, and no effort is made to require them to demonstrate an understanding of Anglophone culture. Visitors and clients to government offices are then expected to speak in French.

== Spiraling ==
As of 2023, the Anglophone problem is still on-going. It has spiralled into violence with police officers and gendarmes shooting dead several civilians. Official sources have put the number at 17 dead, but local individuals and groups have talked of 50 or more. Radical members of some secessionist groups have killed several police officers and gendarmes. 15,000 refugees have fled Southern Cameroons into neighbouring Nigeria, with the UNHCR expecting that number to grow to 40,000 if the situation continues.

== Outcomes ==
Without clearly acknowledging the existence of the Anglophone problem, the President Paul Biya has attempted to appease tensions by making a number of announcements:

- He ordered the creation of a Common Law department at the Supreme Court and the School of Administration and Magistracy, ENAM.
- In his 2017 traditional end-of-year address, he announced that there would be an effective decentralization scheme implemented by the government. The issue of decentralization is one of the major tenets of Cameroon's 1996 constitution which was spearheaded by Anglophone opposition groups in parliament.

Several separatist or secessionist groups have emerged or become more prominent as a result of the harsh response by the government to the Anglophone problem. These groups desire to see Southern Cameroons completely separate from La République du Cameroun and form its own state, sometimes referred to as Ambazonia. Some groups such as the Southern Cameroons Ambazonia Consortium United Front (SCACUF) have used diplomatic means in an attempt to gain independence for the Anglophone regions, whereas other groups have employed armed confrontation against deployed gendarmes and government soldiers in those regions.

== See also ==
- 2016–2017 Cameroonian protests
- Ambazonia
- Anglophone Cameroonian
- Cameroonian English
- Camfranglais
