= 2011 Democratic Republic of the Congo coup attempt =

Alleged coup attempt

The 2011 Democratic Republic of the Congo coup d'état attempt was an alleged coup attempt against President Joseph Kabila on February 27, 2011.

== Events ==
On February 27, 2011, between 1:00 pm and 1:30 pm, two groups of about one hundred people dressed in civilian clothes attacked the presidential residence in Gombe. According to a UN source in Brazzaville, they were unidentified and heavily armed.

According to anonymous sources, the attackers came from the side of the Grand Hôtel de Kinshasa and crossed a first barrier at the level of the Center of International Commerce of the Congo (French: Centre de commerce international de Congo), before being stopped at a second barrier in front of the security building. After about fifteen minutes, they were pushed back by the Armed Forces of the Democratic Republic of the Congo; seven of them were killed and sixteen were taken prisoner.

While fleeing, some attackers fired shots along the Avenue of Armed Forces at the level of Camp Kokolo, causing panic in neighboring communes like Bandalungwa, Ngiri-Ngiri, Kintambo, and Lingwala.

The President of the Democratic Republic of the Congo was not there at the time and was seen on the Boulevard du 30 Juin.

At 4:00 pm, Lambert Mende, the Minister of Communication, announced in French and in Lingala that the situation was under control and that the institutions in place were functioning normally. On March 2, Mende said the attack was an act of terror and that nearly 60 attackers were being interrogated in the hands of security forces. On March 3, the general investigation by the Kinshasa police presented to the press a list of 126 people suspected of having participated in the attack on the president's residence and on camp Kokolo. The police also presented the belongings of the accused: four rocket launchers, a machine gun, ten AK-47 rifles, several machetes, and two vehicles. They also presented ritual items like raffia leaves.

Six people died after being stopped by soldiers at a roadblock near the Kinshasa Presidential Palace. According to some other sources, seven attackers were killed, as well as two palace guards. Subsequent news reports indicated that 19 people died, consisting of 11 attackers and eight members of security forces.

== Reactions ==
On March 9 2011, the NGO Voice of the Voiceless (French: Voix des sans-voix) expressed concern about the events and the investigations and claimed that innocents were apprehended, some of which were tortured. According to Voice of the Voiceless, around 1 pm on March 2, two young students, Rabbi and Tito Karawa, had been apprehended at their house in Ndjili by nine people in civilian clothes and had been tortured. In response to this, Mende declared that the case followed normal protocol, leaving to the courts the decision of who is guilty and who is innocent, and that torture is illegal, inviting any victims to seek justice.
