= COVID-19 pandemic in Lesotho =

Aspect of viral disease pandemic

- Disease: COVID-19
- Pathogen: SARS-CoV-2
- Location: Lesotho
- First outbreak: Wuhan, Hubei, China; 30°35′14″N 114°17′17″E
- Arrival date: 13 May 2020 (6 years, 3 months and 6 days)
- Confirmed cases: 36,140
- Recovered: 34,067
- Deaths: 709

Government website
- National COVID-18 Secretariat

The COVID-19 pandemic in Lesotho is part of the worldwide pandemic of coronavirus disease 2019 (COVID-19) caused by severe acute respiratory syndrome coronavirus 2 (SARS-CoV-2). The virus was confirmed to have reached Lesotho on 13 May 2020.

Prior to this, Lesotho was the last country in Africa to have no reported cases of COVID-19 during the global pandemic.

The country did not have the ability to test for the virus, and so, in order to prevent the spread of the virus the government closed its border with South Africa. On 18 March, the government declared a national emergency despite having no confirmed cases, and closed schools until 17 April, but allowed school meals to continue. Arriving travellers were to be quarantined for 14 days upon arrival. Prime Minister Thomas Thabane announced a three-week lock down from midnight 29 March. Lesotho began sending its samples to South Africa's National Institute for Communicable Diseases for testing.

Recorded cases started to increase rapidly in 2021, with revelations that the government had released COVID-19-positive people from quarantine early, as well as cases attributed to workers travelling home from South Africa. On 8 January, South African border authorities estimated that more than 100 Lesotho arrivals a day were testing positive.

== Timeline ==
=== May 2020 ===
- Lesotho began lifting some aspects of the lockdown from 5 May.
- Lesotho confirmed its first case on 13 May and its second case on 22 May.
- At the end of May, one of the two confirmed cases was still active.

=== June 2020 ===
- Two additional cases were reported on the 3 June. Both had travelled from Cape Town .
- On 22 June, eight additional cases were reported, seven of whom had travelled from South Africa, and one from Zimbabwe.
- During June there were 25 confirmed cases, bringing the total number of confirmed cases to 27. Three patients recovered in June, raising the total number of recovered patients to 4. The remaining 23 cases were still active at the end of June.

=== Subsequent cases ===
- 2020 cases

There were 3,206 confirmed cases in 2020. 1496 patients recovered while 51 persons died. At the end of 2020 there were 1659 active cases.

- 2021 cases

There were 26,446 confirmed cases in 2021, bringing the total number of cases to 29,652. 14,326 patients recovered in 2021 while 620 persons died, bringing the total death toll to 671. At the end of 2021 there were 13,159 active cases.

Modeling carried out by WHO's Regional Office for Africa suggests that due to under-reporting, the true cumulative number of infections by the end of 2021 was around 0.98 million while the true number of COVID-19 deaths was around 700.

- 2022 cases

There were 5,495 confirmed cases in 2022, bringing the total number of cases to 35,147. 38 persons died, bringing the total death toll to 709.

- 2023 cases

There were 745 confirmed cases in 2023, bringing the total number of cases to 35,892. The death toll remained unchanged.

== See also ==
- COVID-19 pandemic in Africa
- COVID-19 pandemic by country and territory
