= 2024 in Lesotho =

- Decades: 2000s; 2010s; 2020s
- See also: Other events of 2024; List of years in Lesotho

Events in the year 2024 in Lesotho.

== Incumbents ==
- King: Letsie III
- Prime Minister: Sam Matekane

== Events ==
=== February ===
- 2 February – Lesotho at the 2024 World Aquatics Championships: Lesotho competes in Doha, Qatar with one athlete in swimming. No medals are won.
- 18 February – Maseru hosts the first AGM of the African Association of Accountants General, beginning a five-day conference on public financial management and governance.

=== March ===
- The Office of the Ombudsperson releases findings that at least 300 detainees at Maseru Correctional Centre had been tortured by Lesotho Correctional Services officers.

=== April ===
- 11 April – The Millennium Challenge Corporation and Lesotho launch a $300 million Health and Horticulture Compact to improve healthcare, create jobs, and boost agriculture.
- 17 April – Staff at the Lesotho Tribune discover threatening notes targeting journalist and proprietor Phafane Nkotsi over reporting on the pension fund.
- A United Nations Independent Expert on persons with albinism reports discrimination in Lesotho, including limited access to healthcare and education.

=== May ===
- The government invokes the Internal Security Act, bans 12 Famo music groups linked to deadly rivalries and deploys the Lesotho Defence Force.

=== July ===
- 26 July – Lesotho at the 2024 Summer Olympics: Three athletes compete in two sports; Tebello Ramakongoana sets a marathon national record in seventh place, and Michelle Tau is eliminated in taekwondo.

=== November ===
- 9 November – Lesotho Pride 2024 takes place in Maseru.
- 13 November – The 6th SADC Groundwater Conference on regional groundwater management, technology, and governance is held.
- 14 November – Lesotho is granted World Rugby Full Member status by the World Rugby Council.

== Holidays ==
- January 1 – New Year's Day
- March 11 – Moshoeshoe's Day
- March 29 – Good Friday
- April 1 – Easter Monday
- May 1 – Workers' Day
- May 9 – Ascension Day
- May 25 – Africa Day
- July 17 – King's Birthday
- October 4 – Independence Day
- December 25 – Christmas Day
- December 26 – Boxing Day

== Deaths ==
- 24 July – Malome Vector, singer-songwriter, car accident
