= 2016–17 Cameroonian protests =

Protests in the anglophone Northwest and Southwest regions of Cameroon

2016-2017 Cameroonian protest
- Part of the Anglophone problem
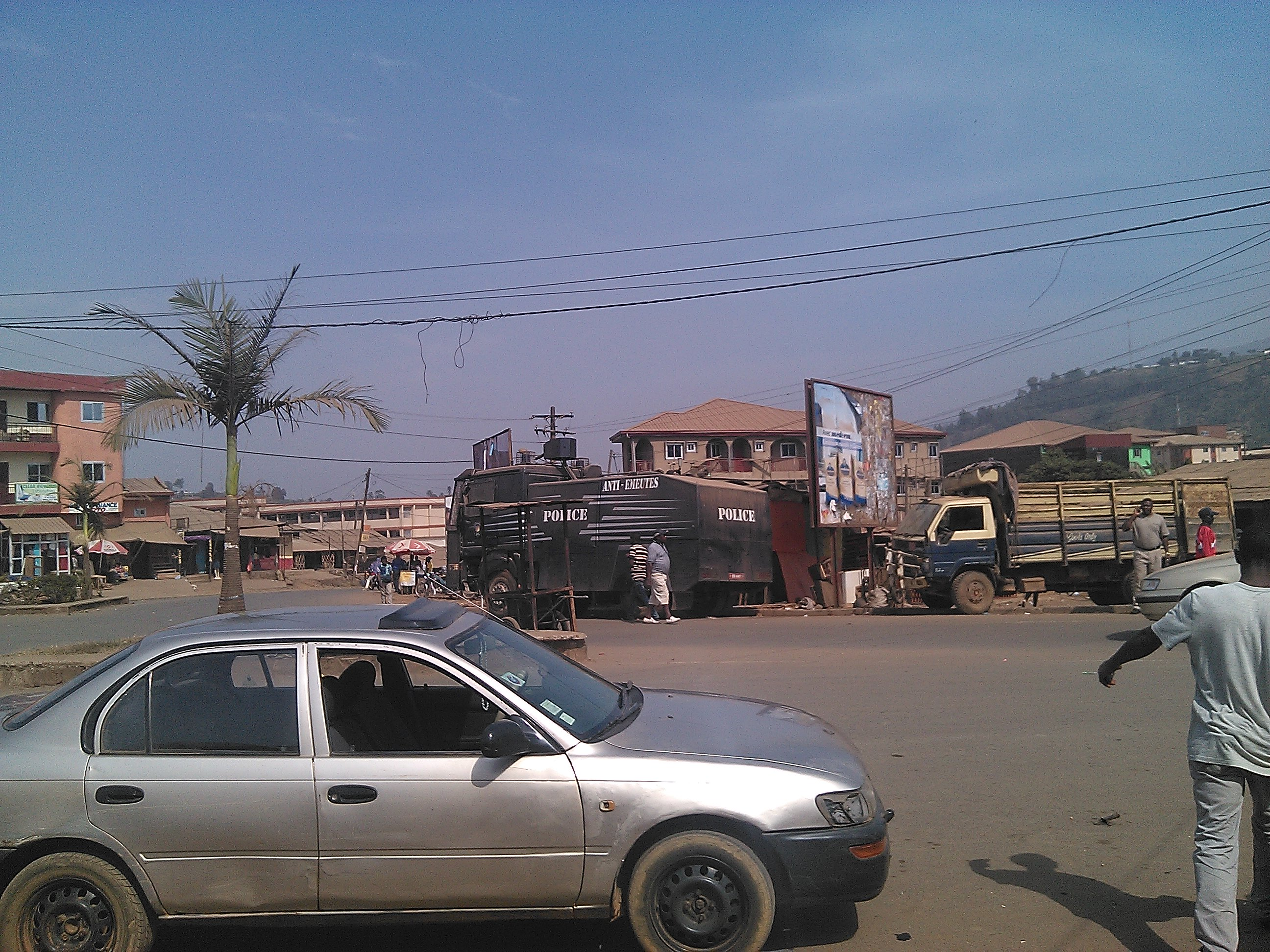
- SWAT vehicle with water cannon from a riot police in Bamenda during protests in 2016.
- Date: 6 October 2016 – October 2017
- Location: Northwest Region and Southwest Region (former Southern Cameroons), Cameroon
- Caused by: Language and marginalization
- Goals: To protect the common law system of Anglophone Cameroonians
- Methods: Demonstrations, ghost town, shutdown of schools
- Result: Outbreak of the Anglophone Crisis

Parties
Cameroon Anglophone Civil Society Consortium (CACSC), activist and Ambazonian separatist groups	Government of Cameroon

Lead figures
Felix Agbor Balla; Fontem Neba	Paul Biya

Casualties and losses
27 killed, many injured	None

The 2016–2017 Cameroonian protests (later known as the Coffin Revolution) were a series of protests that occurred following the appointment of Francophone judges in English-speaking areas of the Republic of Cameroon. In October 2016, protests began in two primarily English-speaking regions: the Northwest Region and the Southwest Region.

On 23 November 2016, it was reported that at least two people were killed and 100 protesters were arrested in Bamenda, a city in the Northwest Region. In September 2017, the protests and the government's response to them escalated into an armed conflict between pro-Ambazonia factions and the Cameroonian government.

== Causes ==
The protests began on 6 October 2016 as a sit-down strike initiated by the Cameroon Anglophone Civil Society Consortium (CACSC), an organization consisting of lawyer and teacher trade unions from the Anglophone regions of Cameroon. The strike was led by Barrister Agbor Balla, Fontem Neba, and Tassang Wilfred.

Common law lawyers of Anglophone Cameroons were said to have written an appeal letter to the government over the use of French in schools and courtrooms in the two English-speaking regions of Cameroon. In an effort to protect the English culture, they began a sit-down strike in all courtrooms on 6 October 2016. Peaceful protests began with marches in the cities of Bamenda, Buea, and Limbe calling for the protection of the common law system in Anglophone Cameroon. They asked for the common law system to be practiced in Anglophone courts and not the civil law used by the French-speaking magistrate. Laws such as the OHADA uniform acts, CEMAC code, and others should be translated into English.

They also asked that the common law system of education in Anglophone universities such as the University of Buea and the University of Bamenda should be addressed by the creation of a law school. The government responded by sending security forces to fire tear gas and allegedly assault protesters and lawyers. During November 2016 thousands of teachers in the Anglophone regions joined the lawyers to protect English culture in Anglophone Cameroon, asking that the French language not be used in schools and courtrooms in English-speaking regions of Cameroon. All schools were shut down in the Anglophone regions, only two months and three weeks after the start of 2016/2017 academic year.

=== Violence and arrests ===
Within two weeks, more than 100 activists had reportedly been arrested. Six were reported dead. Unconfirmed videos released over social media depicted a variety of violent scenes, including demonstrators "parading the dead body of an activist, barricades set ablaze, [and] police brutally beating protesters and firing tear gas against the crowds".

== President Paul Biya's response ==
In his yearly New Year's message to the country, Paul Biya discussed the protests and the Anglophone problem (although without mentioning the phrase 'Anglophone problem'). He said,

All the voices that spoke have been heard. They have, in many cases, raised substantive issues that cannot be overlooked. I have enjoined the Government to engage in frank dialogue with the various parties concerned to find appropriate solutions to the issues raised. I urge them to participate, without any bias, in the various discussions. However, we should never forget that we are walking in the footsteps of our country's founding fathers, our national heroes, who shed their blood to bequeath to posterity a nation that is united in its diversity. Cameroon's unity is, therefore, a precious legacy with which no one should take liberties. Any claim, no matter how relevant, loses its legitimacy once it jeopardizes, even slightly, the building of national unity. Do I need to repeat this? Cameroon is one and indivisible! It shall so remain.

=== Government dialogue ===
In response, the government of Cameroon created an ad hoc committee to dialogue with members of the CACSC led by Tassang Wilfred in Bamenda from the Consortium and minister Jacques Fame Ndongo in January 2017. The first meeting was not fruitful, as the consortium members demanded the government release all arrested before any dialogue; more cases of arrest continued and were condemned by the Consortium members in the bid to solve the Anglophone problems. They presented a draft for federalism which was condemned by the government, and on 17 January 2017, through a ministerial decree signed by minister Rene Emmanuel Sadi, the CACSC and SCNC were banned in Cameroon, and their activities were described as illegal and against the security and unity of Cameroon. A few days later, two members of the Cameroon civil society were arrested, Agbor Balla and Fontem Neba.

== International reaction ==
More than 13,000 Anglophone Cameroonians residing in Maryland began to protest and called for international bodies to help stop the arrests and marginalization in Cameroon. On 27 June, United States Congressman Anthony Brown filed a petition with the United States Secretary of State, Rex Tillerson, to call for the government of Cameroon to immediately show concern and solve the ongoing crises. The United States condemned the loss of life and brutality against Anglophone protesters.

== Internet outage ==
Around 17 January 2017, reports emerged that an Internet blockade had been implemented in major cities of the Northwest and Southwest Regions of Cameroon; many suspected it was a government ploy to disorganize and stamp out the Anglophone protests.

== 22 September 2017 ==
On Friday, 22 September 2017, thousands of protesters came to the street demanding full independence across villages, towns, and cities in Southern Cameroons. In Buea, the capital of Southern Cameroons, freedom fighters took down a national flag outside a police station while officers looked on and hoisted the blue and white striped flag of Ambazonia (Southern Cameroons), while young boys painted their faces blue and white to represent the territory and chanted "We want freedom". About eight people were reportedly killed, with photos circulating in social media.
On Friday, President Paul Biya, who had been in power for 35 years, was addressing the UN General Assembly in New York, and thousands of Anglophone protesters rallied for independence at the UN headquarters, led by Ayaba Cho Lucas, Sisiku Tabe Ayuk, Barrister Bobga Harmony, and others.

== 1 October 2017 ==
Anglophone separatists declared independence from Cameroon on Sunday, 1 October 2017. Peaceful marches took place on the streets of the English-speaking regions; the protests occurred in several towns : Buea, Bamenda, Kumba, Kumbo, and Mamfe. Protesters carried leaves to symbolize freedom and sang songs as they celebrated their independence. The government responded by deploying fully armed soldiers to Anglophone regions. On 2 October, Amnesty International reported that at least 17 people were killed in a military confrontation.

== See also ==
- Anglophone Crisis
- Anglophone problem (Cameroon)
