= Maesiah Thabane =

Former prime minister of Lesotho's wife

First Lady of Lesotho
- In role 27 August 2017 – 19 May 2020
- Prime Minister: Tom Thabane
- Preceded by: Mathato Mosisili
- Succeeded by: Masekoalane Majoro

Personal details
- Born: Liabiloe Ramoholi; 16 April 1977 (age 48) Mokhotlong, Lesotho
- Party: All Basotho Convention
- Spouse: Tom Thabane (m. 2017)

'Maesaiah or 'Maesiah Thabane (born 16 April 1977) is the wife of the former prime minister of Lesotho Tom Thabane since her marriage to Thabane on 27 August 2017.

On 10 January 2020, police issued an arrest warrant for Maesiah Thabane in connection with the 2017 shooting death of Tom Thabane's estranged wife Lipolelo Thabane.

== Biography ==
Born Liabiloe Ramoholi to Basotho people, she married Tom Thabane on 27 August 2017 at a ceremony held at Setsoto Stadium in Maseru.

She contested the Mokhotlong seat as a candidate of the All Basotho Convention (ABC) party in 2022, receiving 190 votes.

== Controversy ==
In May 2018, allegations arose that Maesiah Thabane Trust Fund Director Makarabo Mojakhomo and her husband, Ministry of Home Affairs officer Thabang Mojakhomo, had defrauded the organisation founded by the first lady of up to L200,000. On May 21, after Makarabo disappeared from police custody, Amnesty International published a plea for "urgent action", reporting, "Makarabo's family fear that she has been subjected to enforced disappearance given the history of such cases in the country involving security forces". After Mojakhomo's reappearance in South Africa in May 2019, she reported fear that the first lady has "powers to control the police and the judiciary so [she] would not get a free and fair trial with her in control".

Thabane was also accused in September 2018 by Motlohi Maliehe, minister of tourism, environment and culture and chairman of the All Basotho Convention (ABC) party, of corrupt action. Maliehe was fired from his ministerial position after he claimed Thabane was "torpedoing government by seeking to control ministers and how they performed their duties" and "instigating the removal of ministers who refused to comply with her demands". Such actions have supposedly contributed to the fracturing of the ABC, one "clouded by" similar "disorderly behaviour".

In response to Maliehe's allegations, Thabane cited frustration at "official bungling and government inertia", which "sometimes forced her to take matters into her own hands to ensure Basotho got [the] services they needed". She said she was particularly concerned about the lack of treatment available for cancer patients, as well as HIV/AIDS. In July 2019, she hosted the 12th Stop Cervical, Breast and Prostate Cancers in Africa Conference (SCCA), which was attended by some African First Ladies.
