= Lipolelo Thabane =

Mosotho political figure, wife of Tom Thabane

Lipolelo Thabane (1959 – June 14, 2017) was a Mosotho political figure and wife of prime minister Tom Thabane. She was murdered on June 14, 2017, two days before her husband's inauguration.

== Biography ==
Lipolelo Thabane was born in Basutoland to a family of five siblings, of which she was the youngest. She had two children and was the second wife of Tom Thabane, whom she married in 1987. She was shot and killed while driving home on June 14, 2017, in Ha Masana, two days before Tom Thabane was to be inaugurated as prime minister of Lesotho.

During the political violence in the Kingdom of Lesotho, Lipolelo Thabane relocated to South African city of Sandton, Johannesburg.

Despite the situation of her divorce from Tom Thabane, the court declared her first lady of Lesotho during Thabane's first run for the prime minister position, instead of his newly customarily wed wife. This was issued on the basis that their filed divorce was not yet granted. In February 2020, Maesiah Thabane, Tom Thabane's current wife, was investigated for Lipolelo Thabane's murder.
