= Anglophone Cameroonians =

English-speaking Cameroonian, mostly of the far western regions

Anglophone Cameroonian
Total population
- 6,600,000 (2024)

Regions with significant populations
- Cameroon: 6,600,000

Languages
- English, Pidgin English

Related ethnic groups
- Cameroonians

Anglophone Cameroonians are the people of various cultural backgrounds, most of who hail from the English-speaking regions of Cameroon (Northwest and Southwest Regions). These regions were formerly known as the British Southern Cameroons, being part of the League of Nations mandate and United Nations Trust Territories administered by the United Kingdom. An anglophone Cameroonian is widely regarded as anyone who has lived in the North West and South West regions of Cameroon, who has received an education from institutions modeled on the British system of education and law.

The two English-speaking regions of Cameroon make up 22% of a population of 30 million (2025).

== Political representation ==
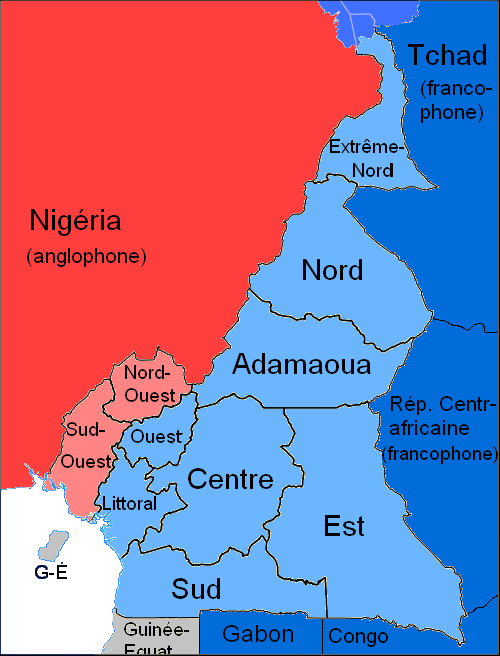
Map of French (blue) and English (red) as official regional languages of Cameroon and adjacent countries. The proportion of Anglophone Cameroonians is currently at around 16%, down from 21% in 1976.

The Social Democratic Front, the largest opposition political party in Cameroon's parliament, is headed by an Anglophone. Separatist movements, notably the Southern Cameroons National Council (SCNC) and the Southern Cameroons Peoples Organization (SCAPO), call for the separation of the two English-speaking regions from French-speaking Cameroun in response to the dismantling in May 1972 of the federation formed in 1961 and subsequent marginalization of the Anglophone minority by the Francophone majority and its political leadership. As of March 2017, only one of the 36 government ministers who control departmental budgets is an Anglophone.

== 2016–2017 protests and government response ==
In November 2016, after a law was not translated, Anglophone lawyers began a protest in Bamenda against the central government for failing to uphold the constitutional guarantee of a bilingual nation. They were joined by teachers, protesting central government appointees with lackluster English skills, and ordinary citizens. In December, security forces dispersed protests and at least two protesters were killed and others injured.

Protesters have also been accused of violence, however, the government's heavy-handed crackdown has revived calls for the restoration of Southern Cameroons' independence gained on the 1st of October 1961. Various protesters were arrested, including Nkongho Felix Agbor-Balla, the president of the Cameroon Anglophone Civil Society Consortium, and Fontem Neba, the group's secretary general. The Cameroon Anglophone Civil Society Consortium was declared illegal by the government on 17 January 2017 and "any other related groups with similar objectives" were prohibited." Amnesty International has called for the release of Agbor-Balla and Neba.

The central government shut down the internet in the Anglophone regions in mid January and was restored in April 2017, following a request for restoration by the United Nations. The NGO Internet Without Borders estimated that the blackout cost the Cameroonian economy almost €3 million (US$3.2 million).

== See also ==
- Anglophone problem
- Cameroonian English
- Cameroonian Pidgin English
- Two Canadian groups with a broad sociolinguistic similarity to Anglophone Cameroonians:
  - English-speaking Quebecers (first-language speakers of a minority language within their province)
  - French Canadians (first-language speakers of a minority language in Canada as a whole)
- Human rights in Cameroon
- Linguistic discrimination
