= Tom Thabane =

Prime Minister of Lesotho, 2012–15, 2017–20

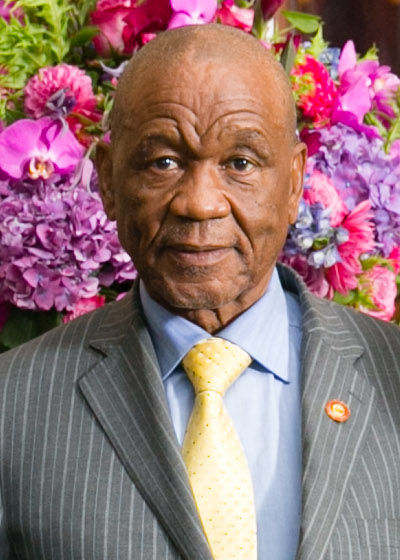
- Thabane in 2014

4th Prime Minister of Lesotho
- In office 16 June 2017 – 19 May 2020
- Monarch: Letsie III
- Deputy: Monyane Moleleki
- Preceded by: Pakalitha Mosisili
- Succeeded by: Moeketsi Majoro
- In office 8 June 2012 – 17 March 2015
- Monarch: Letsie III
- Deputy: Mothetjoa Metsing
- Preceded by: Pakalitha Mosisili
- Succeeded by: Pakalitha Mosisili

Leader of the All Basotho Convention
- In office October 2006 – 2 February 2022
- Preceded by: Party established
- Succeeded by: Nkaku Kabi

Personal details
- Born: Thomas Motsoahae Thabane; 28 May 1939 (age 86) Maseru, Basutoland
- Party: Lesotho Congress for Democracy (Before 2006); All Basotho Convention (2006–present)
- Spouses: Matoka Judith Thabane (?–?); Lipolelo Thabane (1987–2017; her death); Maesiah Thabane (m. 2017)
- Children: 5
- Education: National University of Lesotho (BA)

Thomas Motsoahae Thabane (born 28 May 1939) is a Mosotho politician who was the fifth Prime Minister of Lesotho from 2012 to 2015 and from 2017 to 2020. He founded the All Basotho Convention (ABC) in 2006 and led the party until 2022.

Thabane served in the government of Prime Minister Pakalitha Mosisili from 1998 to 2006 as a member of the ruling Lesotho Congress for Democracy (LCD), but in 2006 he split from the LCD and launched the All Basotho Convention (ABC). After more than five years in opposition, he built a coalition of 12 parties in the wake of the 2012 Lesotho parliamentary election and was appointed prime minister.

In the 2015 Lesotho parliamentary election, the ABC was democratically removed from power by a seven-party coalition led by Mosisili, though the ABC did win the most constituencies. Two months later, Thabane fled to South Africa with two other opposition leaders, claiming that their lives were in danger. They returned to Lesotho on 12 February 2017 to participate in a parliamentary vote of no confidence that unseated Mosisili. Thabane went on to win a plurality of seats in the subsequent parliamentary election and returned as prime minister.

In 2020, Thabane faced pressure to resign as prime minister due to his alleged involvement in his ex-spouse's murder. He announced on 18 May that he would resign the following day.

== Political career ==
Thabane served as Principal Secretary for Health under Leabua Jonathan, the second prime minister of Lesotho, until the military overthrew Jonathan in 1986. Thabane then served with the military regime under General Justin Lekhanya until 1991. He was Minister of Foreign Affairs from 1990 to 1991.

Thabane became an advisor to Prime Minister Ntsu Mokhehle in early 1995. He subsequently served again as Foreign Minister in Mosisili's LCD government from June 1998 to June 2002, when he was appointed as Minister of Home Affairs and Public Safety. In November 2004 he was appointed Minister of Communications, Science and Technology.

=== In opposition ===
Thabane resigned from the government on 9 October 2006, and formed a new party, the All Basotho Convention (ABC). He claimed that his goal was to unite all Basotho, not only those from the Congress party or National Party. Some believed the ABC could lead Lesotho to economic development.

18 MPs crossed the floor to join the ABC in opposition on 13 October 2006; 17 of these (including Thabane) had been LCD members, and one had been an independent. Thabane's party thus became the third-largest party in Parliament. The ruling party was left with 61 of the 120 parliamentary seats; with such a precarious majority, Mosisili requested the dissolution of Parliament, and an early election was called for February 2007. In the election, the ABC took 17 out of 80 constituency seats, while the LCD took 61. Thabane said that the vote was free but not fair.

An extended dispute followed the 2007 election regarding the allocation of seats based on proportional representation. Five opposition parties called for the Speaker of Parliament to designate Thabane as Leader of the Opposition in March 2007, but the Speaker rejected this on the grounds that the agreement made by the opposition parties was not legitimate. National Independent Party leader Dominic Motikoe was instead designated the Leader of the Opposition, despite leading a party that was allied with the LCD.

On 14 June 2007, an assassination attempt on Thabane allegedly occurred, with gunmen firing outside his home. Several other incidents of political violence occurred around the same time, and an indefinite curfew was imposed; it was lifted later in the month. Thabane was critical of the curfew and accused the police of excessively harsh enforcement of it.

The LCD's reluctance to engage in talks regarding the political situation prompted Thabane on 18 October 2007 to threaten street protests to pressure the government into holding a new election "if they continue to fail to cooperate".

After a 22 April 2009 assault on Mosisili's residence, which was believed to have been a failed attempt to kill him, police said that retired officer Makotoko Lerotholi, a bodyguard of Thabane, was suspected of involvement in the attack. Thabane condemned the government for placing blame on the opposition, describing it as "treachery".

=== Prime minister ===
After more than five years in opposition, Thabane formed a coalition with other parties in the wake of the 2012 Lesotho parliamentary election and was appointed prime minister.

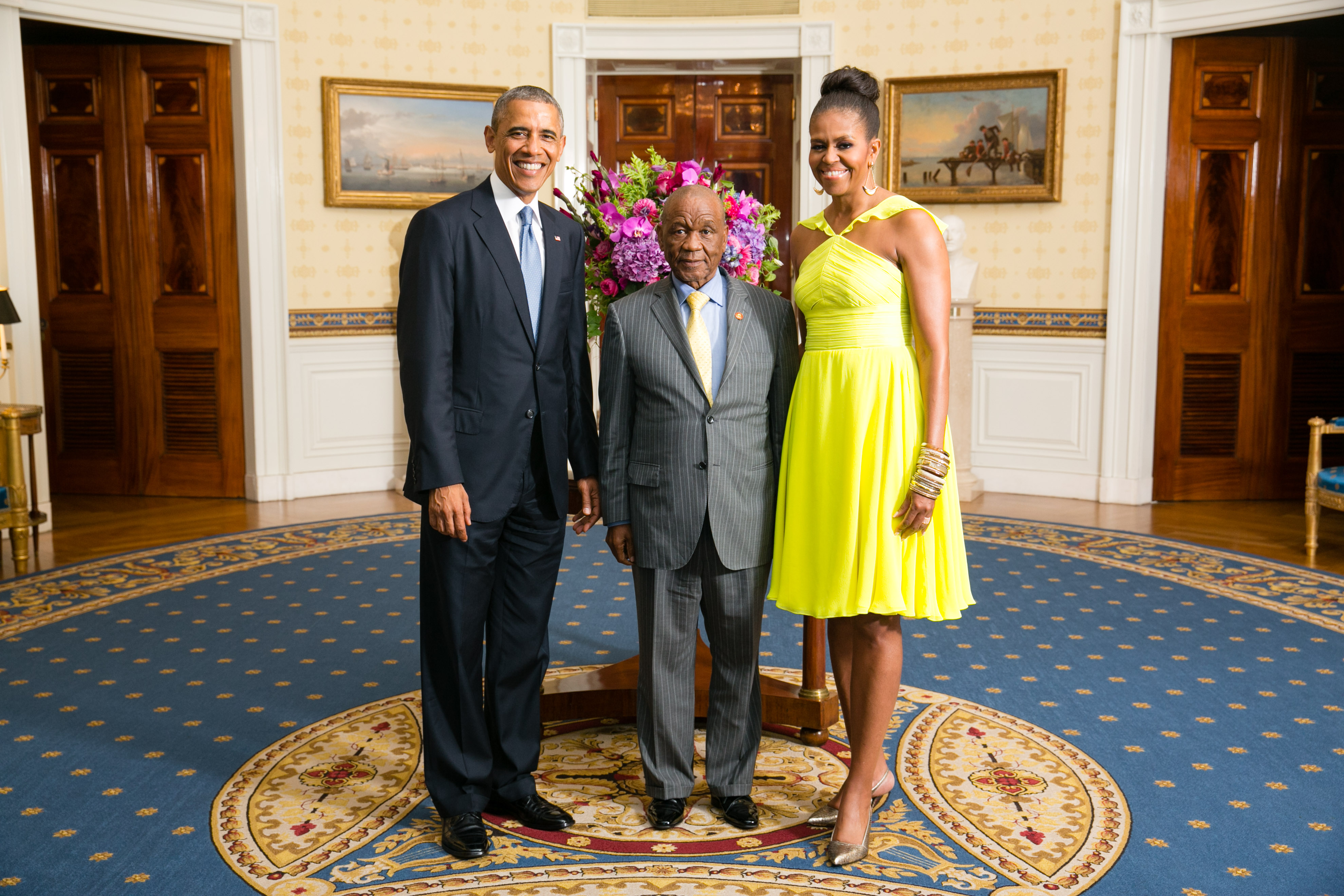
Thabane with Barack and Michelle Obama days before he fled to South Africa

Thabane fled to South Africa on 30 August 2014, alleging that the military was attempting to take power and wanted to kill him. He said that he would go back to Lesotho only if he felt his life was not in danger. The military denied the allegations. He returned to Lesotho on 3 September 2014 under the protection of South African police.

=== Post-premiership ===
Thabane's party failed to attain a majority in the 2015 snap election and was unsuccessful in forming a coalition government. In an interview on the South African Broadcasting Corporation, Thabane said this would be his last term in parliament. He cited Nelson Mandela as an example of a leader who voluntarily left office.

Following the opposition's June 2015 boycott of parliament to protest the government's alleged disinterest in investigating circumstances surrounding Brigadier-General Maaparankoe Mahao's death, Thabane and two other opposition party leaders left for South Africa and did not attend any parliamentary sittings, citing security issues and instability in the country. On 12 February 2017, they returned to Lesotho, declaring that Mosisili no longer commanded a parliamentary majority and vowing to oust him in a vote of no confidence. Thabane claimed that he was risking his life by returning.

=== Prime Minister (2017–2020) ===
Mosisili was defeated in the vote of no confidence, leading to a new election in June 2017. The ABC won the most seats, and with its allies was able to command a majority. Thabane was sworn in as prime minister on 16 June 2017.

In October 2017 rumours that Thabane had been hospitalised in South Africa were dismissed by a spokesperson as propaganda intended to destabilise Lesotho.

In 2020, Thabane faced pressure to resign due to allegations of murdering his ex-wife. On 11 May 2020, his coalition government collapsed after his coalition partners withdrew their support. National Assembly Speaker Sephiri Motanyane said that Thabane would have to step down by 22 May as he was now leading a caretaker government. Thabane announced on 18 May that he would effectively resign the following day. Finance minister Moeketsi Majoro was designated as his successor.

Thabane initially resisted calls from ABC members to step down as leader. He announced his intention to relinquish the party leadership in January 2022, citing poor health and his advanced age. The party then elected Nkaku Kabi to succeed Thabane.

== Personal life ==
Thabane's first wife was Matoka Judith Thabane (maiden name Mamotapanyane Yayi Fobo), with whom he had four children. She retained her married name after they divorced and died of natural causes on 26 August 2017 at the age of 79.

Thabane was next married to Lipolelo Thabane, who filed for divorce from him in 2012. On 14 June 2017, Lipolelo Thabane was shot dead in Ha-'Masana, outside Maseru.

On 27 August 2017, Thabane married Maesiah Thabane at a Catholic ceremony in Setsoto Stadium in Maseru. In the first week of January 2020, the ruling All Basotho Convention (ABC) party asked him to resign over his suspension of the police commissioner Holomo Molibeli, who had linked him to Lipolelo's murder.

== Murder allegations ==
On 10 January 2020, an arrest warrant was issued for Maesiah Thabane, who is wanted in connection with the 2017 murder of Lipolelo Thabane. Maesiah Thabane went into hiding and Prime Minister Thabane announced his intent to resign from office shortly after her arrest warrant was issued.

On 20 February 2020, police announced that Thabane would also be charged with murder in the case. On 21 February 2020, Thabane failed to appear in court for the case, with his son saying he had traveled to South Africa to see a doctor. Police warned that if he does not return to the country, an arrest warrant will be issued. Both his son and press secretary said that he had "not fled the country" and that he would return to the country as soon as his doctor in Johannesburg releases him. They also said that "he is willing to appear before the court of a law and hear the charges against him." The murder charges levied against him made him to be the first prime minister of Lesotho to announce his resignation.

On 22 February 2020, Thabane was granted a sick leave until 27 February when he is due to appear in court to hear the charges, the country's deputy police commissioner said. Members of his party, also, have urged him to step down sooner than the end of July as he has planned.

On 24 February 2020, while on sick leave, Thabane appeared in a Maseru court for a pre-trial hearing. The charges against him were not read as his lawyers requested the case be referred to the high court to answer for a possible immunity.

On 30 November 2021, he was charged with the murder of his wife.

== Honours ==
=== Foreign honours ===
- Italy
  - (Kingdom of the Two Sicilies) Two Sicilian Royal Family: Knight Grand Cross of the Royal Order of Francis I

Party political offices
New office	Leader of the All Basotho Convention; 2006–2022	Succeeded by Nkaku Kabi
Political offices
Preceded by Pakalitha Mosisili	Prime Minister of Lesotho; 2012–2014	Succeeded by Mothetjoa Metsing; Acting
Preceded by Mothetjoa Metsing; Acting	Prime Minister of Lesotho; 2014–2015	Succeeded by Pakalitha Mosisili
Preceded by Pakalitha Mosisili	Prime Minister of Lesotho; 2017–2020	Succeeded by Moeketsi Majoro
