= French world =

French world may refer to:

- Francophonie, the quality of speaking French
- Organisation internationale de la Francophonie, an organization of French-speaking countries and regions
- Geographical distribution of French speakers
- French colonial empire
- Culture of France
