= Blondet =

Blondet is a surname that it may refer to:

- Francis Blondet (born 1945), French diplomat
- Giselle Blondet (born 1964), Puerto Rican actress and TV host
- Héctor Blondet (1947–2006), Puerto Rican basketball player
- Jean-Philippe Blondet, executive chef of the Alain Ducasse at the Dorchester, a three-Michelin-star restaurant, since 2016
- Emile Blondet, a character in La Comédie humaine by Honoré de Balzac
