= Geographical distribution of French speakers =

The French language became an international language, the second international language alongside Latin, in the Middle Ages, "from the fourteenth century onwards". It was not by virtue of the power of the Kingdom of France: '"... until the end of the fifteenth century, the French of the chancellery spread as a political and literary language because the French court was the model of chivalric culture". Consequently, it was less as a centralising monarch than as a "gentle courtly prince" that the king unwittingly spread his language" and "the methods of expansion were not political"'. This status continued to grow into the 18th century, by which time French was the language of European diplomacy and international relations.

The terms Francophonie or Francophone world refer the whole body of people and organizations around the world who use the French language regularly for private or public purposes. French is an official de jure language in 26 independent nations and 10 territories, the second most number of countries after English. It is the 22nd most natively spoken language in the world, the 6th most spoken by total number of speakers, and the third most geographically widespread language, with about 50 countries and territories having it as a de jure or de facto official, administrative, or cultural language. In 2017 it was the second most studied language in the world with about 120 million learners. Although it is an official language in more than two dozen countries, its role as a native or majority language is limited to only five states and territories (Note: French is spoken as a mother tongue by the majority of the population (in descending order of the number of speakers) in France, Canada (Quebec), Belgium (Wallonia and the Brussels-Capital Region), western Switzerland (Romandy) and Monaco.); in most other Francophone countries it serves primarily as a second language or lingua franca.

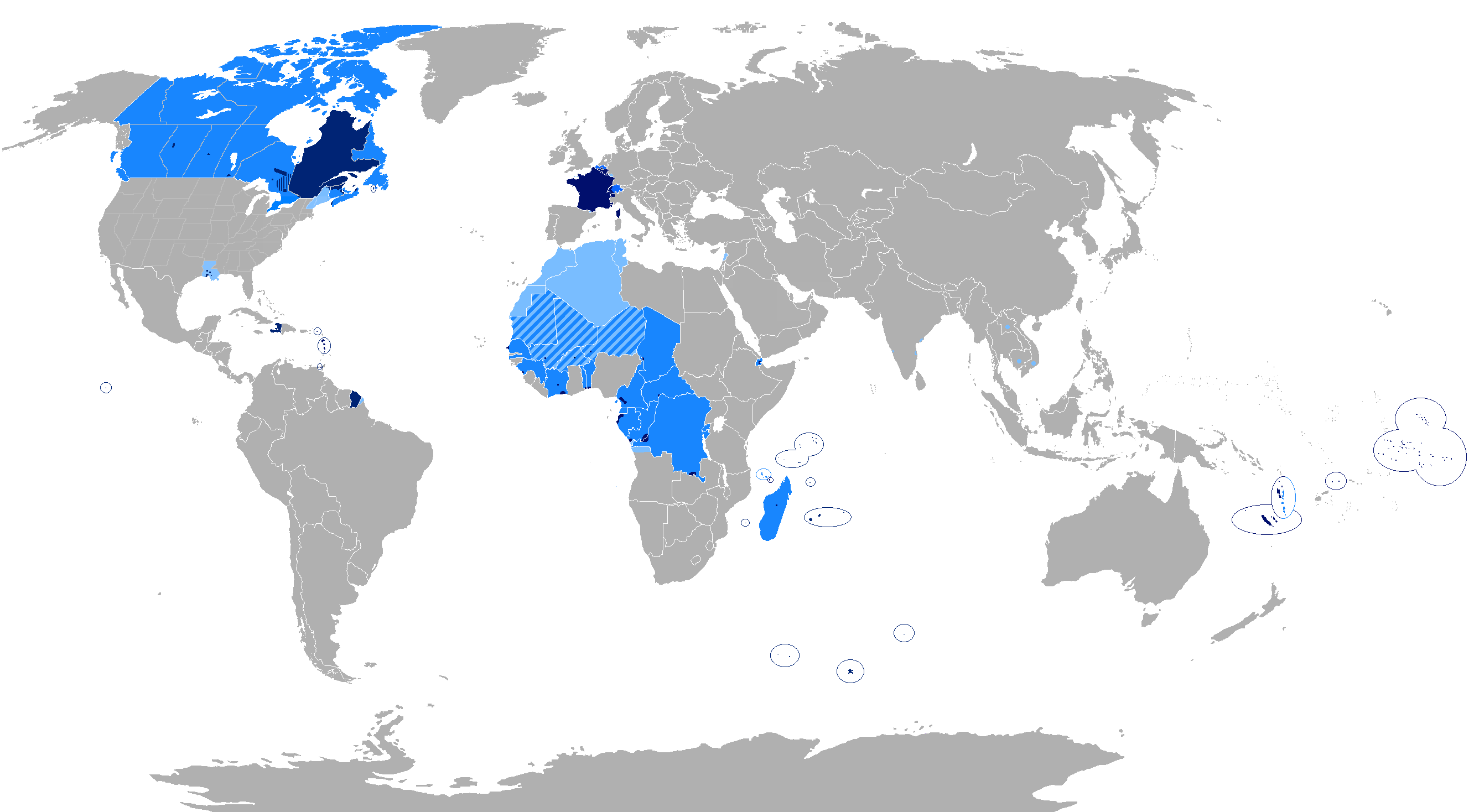
Regions where French is a majority native language (including creoles) Regions where French is an official or administrative language but not a majority native language Regions where French is an unofficial secondary language or a minority language

According to the 2022 report of the Organisation internationale de la Francophonie (OIF), 321 million people speak French. The OIF states that despite a decline in the number of learners of French in Europe, the overall number of speakers is rising, largely because of its presence in African countries: of the 212 million who use French daily, 54.7% are living in Africa. The OIF figures have been contested as being underestimated due to the methodology used and its strict definition of the word francophone. The French Conseil économique, social et environnemental estimate that were they included, the total number of French speakers passed 500 million in the year 2020. In the 21st century, its use, geography, and sociopolitical context continues to shift with declines in some areas (including academia) and growth in others.

Proportion of French speakers (including L2-speakers) by country in 2022, saturating at 50%, according to the OIF 0–9% Francophone 10–19% Francophone 20–29% Francophone 30–39% Francophone 40–49% Francophone 50%+ Francophone

== Statistics ==
=== OIF figures ===
French speakers by Regions
1. Europe (41.2%)
2. Maghreb (12.7%)
3. Sub-Saharan Africa (44.1%)
4. North America (0.50%)
5. Others (1.50%)

Population who can understand French in the EU and UK

The following figures are from a 2022 report of the Organisation internationale de la Francophonie (OIF). No distinctions are made between native speakers of French and those who learnt it as a foreign language, between different levels of mastery or how often the language is used in daily life. For African countries where French is the main language of education, the number of French speakers is derived from the average number of schooling years.

Country	French speakers	%	Basis of projection
Albania	29,731	1.04%	Adult Education Survey
Algeria	14,903,789	32.86%	2008 census
Andorra	54,315	70.12%	2009 national survey
Armenia	10,105	0.34%	2011 census
Austria	1,166,035	12.86%	2012 Eurobarometer + Adult Education Survey
Belgium	8,814,948	75.55%	2012 Eurobarometer + Adult Education Survey
Benin	4,306,099	33.68%	2013 census
Bosnia and Herzegovina	25,523	0.79%	Adult Education Survey
Bulgaria	157,440	2.30%	2012 Eurobarometer + Adult Education Survey
Burkina Faso	5,403,610	24.45%	Demographic and Health Survey
Burundi	1,073,506	8.50%	2008 census
Cambodia	463,248	2.70%	2010 OIF report + 2010 observations
Cameroon	11,490,652	41.17%	2005 census
Canada	11,060,585	28.58%	2016 census
Cape Verde	61,000	10.8%	OIF survey
Central African Republic	1,435,061	28.61%	Demographic and Health Survey
Chad	2,249,023	12.92%	2009 census
Colombia	4,636	0.01%	French embassy in Colombia 2016
Comoros	237,140	35.69%	2003 census
Congo	3,518,464	60.69%	Demographic and Health Survey
Costa Rica	5,231	0.10%	Rivard (2016)
Croatia	95,650	2.36%	2005 Eurobarometer + Adult Education Survey
Cuba	339	0.003%	French embassy in Cuba 2019
Cyprus	80,711	6.60%	2012 Eurobarometer + Adult Education Survey
Czech Republic	233,351	2.17%	2012 Eurobarometer + Adult Education Survey
Denmark	442,142	7.51%	2012 Eurobarometer + Adult Education Survey
Djibouti	508,049	50%	OIF survey
Dominica	6,936	9.59%	2010 OIF report + 2006-2007 OIF survey
Dominican Republic	158,808	1.44%	2014 OIF report
DR Congo	48,924,702	51.37%	Demographic and Health Survey
Egypt	3,204,706	3.02%	OIF survey
Equatorial Guinea	432,705	28.91%	OIF survey
Estonia	19,200	1.45%	2011 census
Finland	437,772	7.88%	2012 Eurobarometer + Adult Education Survey
France (Metropolitan)	63,958,684	97.52%	2012 Eurobarometer + Adult Education Survey
Gabon	1,865,225	80%	World Atlas
Gambia	511,699	20.00%	2018 OIF observer application
Georgia	16,594	0.42%	2002 census
Germany	12,242,129	14.88%	Adult Education Survey
Ghana	273,795	0.85%	2010 census
Greece	754,215	7.31%	2012 Eurobarometer + Adult Education Survey
Guinea	3,776,680	27.24%	Demographic and Health Survey
Guinea-Bissau	317,351	15.38%	OIF survey
Haiti	4,906,073	42.00%	2010 OIF report
Hungary	113,216	1.18%	2011 census
Ireland	635,876	12.67%	2012 Eurobarometer + Adult Education Survey
Israel	527,804	5.92%	OIF survey
Italy	11,796,508	19.58%	2012 Eurobarometer + Adult Education Survey
Ivory Coast	9,324,605	33.61%	2014 census
Kosovo	25,517	1.41%	2011 census
Laos	204,188	2.73%	OIF survey
Latvia	20,220	1.09%	2012 Eurobarometer + Adult Education Survey
Lebanon	2,539,554	37.99%	2010 OIF report + 2012 observations
Lithuania	62,492	2.35%	2012 Eurobarometer + Adult Education Survey
Luxembourg	590,896	91.99%	2012 Eurobarometer + Adult Education Survey
Madagascar	7,729,277	26.49%	2018 census
Mali	3,702,660	17.24%	2009 census
Malta	58,158	13.10%	2012 Eurobarometer + Adult Education Survey
Mauritania	655,948	13.38%	2013 census
Mauritius	926,053	72.65%	OIF survey
Mexico	30,184	0.02%	Rivard (2016)
Moldova	54,579	1.36%	2014 census
Monaco	38,549	96.91%	OIF survey
Montenegro	12,897	2.05%	2011 census
Morocco	13,456,845	35.63%	2014 census
Mozambique	98,822	0.30%	OIF survey
Netherlands	3,306,754	19.21%	2012 Eurobarometer + Adult Education Survey
Niger	3,362,988	12.89%	2012 census
North Macedonia	42,544	2.04%	Adult Education Survey
Norway	167,905	3.05%	Adult Education Survey
Paraguay	14,612	0.20%	2002 census
Peru	371	0.001%	Alliances françaises in Peru 2018
Poland	947,243	2.51%	2012 Eurobarometer + Adult Education Survey
Portugal	2,546,977	25.12%	2012 Eurobarometer + Adult Education Survey
Qatar	126,751	4.25%	2012 OIF associate application
Romania	2,281,829	11.99%	2012 Eurobarometer + Adult Education Survey
Russia	628,723	0.43%	2010 census
Rwanda	792,815	5.83%	2012 census
Saint Lucia	3,002	1.62%	2010 OIF report + 2003 OIF survey
São Tomé and Príncipe	45,984	20.20%	OIF survey
Senegal	4,640,365	26.29%	2013 census
Serbia (excl. Kosovo)	244,973	3.58%	Adult Education Survey
Seychelles	52,699	53.00%	OIF survey
Slovakia	113,621	2.08%	2012 Eurobarometer + Adult Education Survey
Slovenia	50,042	2.41%	2012 Eurobarometer + Adult Education Survey
Spain	5,471,670	11.71%	2012 Eurobarometer + Adult Education Survey
Suriname	537	0.09%	2017 census
Sweden	844,989	8.27%	2012 Eurobarometer + Adult Education Survey
Switzerland	5,889,496	67.13%	Adult Education Survey
Thailand	578,085	0.82%	2010 OIF report + 2010 observations
Togo	3,554,266	40.94%	2010 census
Tunisia	6,321,391	52.47%	2014 census
Ukraine	52,822	0.12%	2001 census
United Arab Emirates	264,153	2.62%	2018 OIF application for a status change
United Kingdom	11,281,136	16.47%	2012 Eurobarometer + Adult Education Survey
United States	2,179,246	0.65%	2017 American Community Survey
Uruguay	5,096	0.15%	Rivard (2016)
Vanuatu	100,153	31.12%	2009 census
Vietnam	692,983	0.70%	2010 OIF report + pre-2010 observations

==== Other territories ====
Territory	Country	French speakers	Percentage	Year	Reference
French Community of Belgium	Belgium	4,658,000	98%	2014	
New Brunswick	Canada	320,000	42%	2014	
Ontario	Canada	1,530,440	11.38%	2016	
Québec	Canada	7,666,000	93%	2014	
Collectivity of Saint Martin	France	33,375	84%	2022	
French Guiana	France	162,000	62%	2015	
French Polynesia	France	276,000	98%	2015	
Guadeloupe	France	395,000	84%	2015	
Martinique	France	329,000	81%	2015	
Mayotte	France	147,000	63%	2015	
New Caledonia	France	260,000	99%	2015	
Réunion	France	788,000	88%	2015	
Saint Barthélemy	France	8,355	84%	2022	
Saint Pierre and Miquelon	France	6,000	100%	2015	
Wallis and Futuna	France	11,000	83%	2015	
Aosta Valley	Italy	72,000	60%	2001	
Aruba	Netherlands	117	0.11%	2022	
Louisiana	United States	84,163	1.84%	2022	
Puerto Rico	United States	849	0.03%	2022	
United States Virgin Islands	United States	8,941	8.60%	2022	

=== Native speakers ===
French native speakers by countries
1. France (77.8%)
2. Canada (9.80%)
3. Belgium (5.40%)
4. Switzerland (2.50%)
5. United States (1.50%)
6. Spain (0.60%)
7. Others (2.40%)

It is estimated that 80 million people worldwide speak French as a main or first language. The following table gathers data from different sources in order to estimate the number of French native speakers by country. The total sum of speakers from this data is around 78 million people.

Country	L1 speakers	Percentage	Year	Reference	Region
Algeria (Note: The percentage is calculated from the World Bank population estimate for the given year.)	10,200	0.03%	2012		Africa
Andorra	7,970	10.0%	2022		Europe
Angola	14,497	0.04%	2024		Africa
Australia	57,739	0.3%	2011		Australasia
Austria	10,190	0.1%	2001		Europe
Belgium (Note: Based on a 2023 population of 11,697,557 (StatBel))	4,211,000	36%	2023		Europe
Benin	16,700	0.3%	1993		Africa
Burkina Faso	261,000	1.2%	2021		Africa
Burundi	2,200	0.03%	2004		Africa
Cambodia	873	0.01%	2008		Asia
Canada	7,651,360	20.8%	2021		North America
Central African Republic	9,000	0.3%	1996		Africa
Chad	3,000	0.05%	1993		Africa
Comoros	1,700	0.4%	1993		Africa
Congo-Brazzaville	28,000	1.1%	1993		Africa
Cote d'Ivoire	17,500	0.2%	1988		Africa
Cyprus	2,546	0.3%	2021		Asia/Europe
Czech Republic (Note: 2,056 or 0.02% of the total population of 10,436,560)	2,056	0.02%	2011		Europe
Djibouti	10,200	1.3%	2006		Africa
Estonia	124	0.01%	2011		Europe
Finland	4,402	0.1%	2018		Europe
France (Note: Based on a 2023 population of 68,143,433 (INSEE))	60,647,000	89%	2023		Europe
Gabon	320,000	15.1%	2018		Africa
Georgia (Note: Based on a 2002 population of 4,371,535 (Geostat))	28	0.001%	2002		Asia/Europe
Germany	194,000	0.2%	2024		Europe
Hungary (Note: 117,121 – 98,178 = 18,943 (total speakers less non-native speakers), or 0.2% of the total population of 9,937,628)	18,943	0.2%	2011		Europe
India	150,000	0.02%	2008		Asia
Ireland (Note: Based on number of "total population usually present in the state", which was 5,084,879 during 2021 census)	51,568	1.0%	2021		Europe
Italy	116,287	0.21%	2012		Europe
Lebanon	16,600	0.4%	2004		Asia
Liechtenstein	79	0.2%	2020		Europe
Lithuania	95	0.003%	2011		Europe
Luxembourg	83,802	14.9%	2021		Europe
Madagascar	101,004	0.57%	2003		Africa
Mali	7,000	0.09%	1998		Africa
Malta	4,521	0.91%	2021		Europe
Mauritius	51,000	4%	2018		Africa
Monaco	16,500	45%	2014		Europe
Morocco	80,000	0.3%	2007		Africa
New Zealand	55,116	1.2%	2018		Australasia
Niger	6,000	0.1%	1993		Africa
Poland (Note: 3,488 or 0.01% of the total population of 38,511,824)	3,488	0.01%	2011		Europe
Rwanda	2,300	0.03%	2004		Africa
Senegal	59,605	0.6%	2002		Africa
Spain	432,209	0.94%	2021		Europe
Seychelles (Note: The figures are calculated on the population of 15 years of age or more)	650	0.7%	2010		Africa
South Africa	9,268	0.02%	1996		Africa
Switzerland	1,977,826	22.6%	2023		Europe
Togo	136,623	1.9%	2022		Africa
Tunisia	11,000	0.1%	1993		Africa
United Kingdom (England and Wales)	120,259	0.2%	2021		Europe
United States	1,194,555	0.4%	2023		North America
Vanuatu (Note: 0.6% of a 2009 population of 239,839 (VNSO))	1,942	0.8%	2020		Melanesia

==== Subnational territories ====
Territory	Country	L1 speakers	Percentage	Year	Reference
Flanders	Belgium	367,000	5.9%	2009	
New Brunswick	Canada	240,455	32.5%	2011	
Nova Scotia	Canada	31,110	3.4%	2011	
Ontario	Canada	597,000	4.3%	2016	
Québec	Canada	6,540,735	77.7%	2021	
Manitoba	Canada	51,280	4.3%	2011	
Alberta	Canada	68 435	2.1%	2011	
British Columbia	Canada	63 625	1.4%	2011	
Uusimaa	Finland	2,823	0.17%	2018	
Mayotte (Note: Based on a 2012 population of 212,600 (INSEE))	France	21,000	10%	2014	
Réunion (Note: Based on a 2010 population of 821,136 (INSEE))	France	65,700	8%	2010	
Puducherry (Note: Based on a 1981 population of 604,471 (Planning and Research Department of Puducherry))	India	10,600	0.26%	1982	
Aosta Valley (Note: Based on a 2003 population of 120,909 (ISTAT))	Italy	1,500	1.3%	2003	
Romandy	Switzerland	1,606,029	83.6%	2013	
Louisiana	United States	119,931	2.8%	2013	
Maine	United States	47,066	3.73%	2012	
Massachusetts	United States	65,874	1.06%	2012	
Connecticut	United States	35,565	1.05%	2012	
New Hampshire	United States	24,697	1.98%	2012	
Vermont	United States	9,543	1.61%	2012	
Rhode Island	United States	11,477	1.15%	2012	

== Africa ==
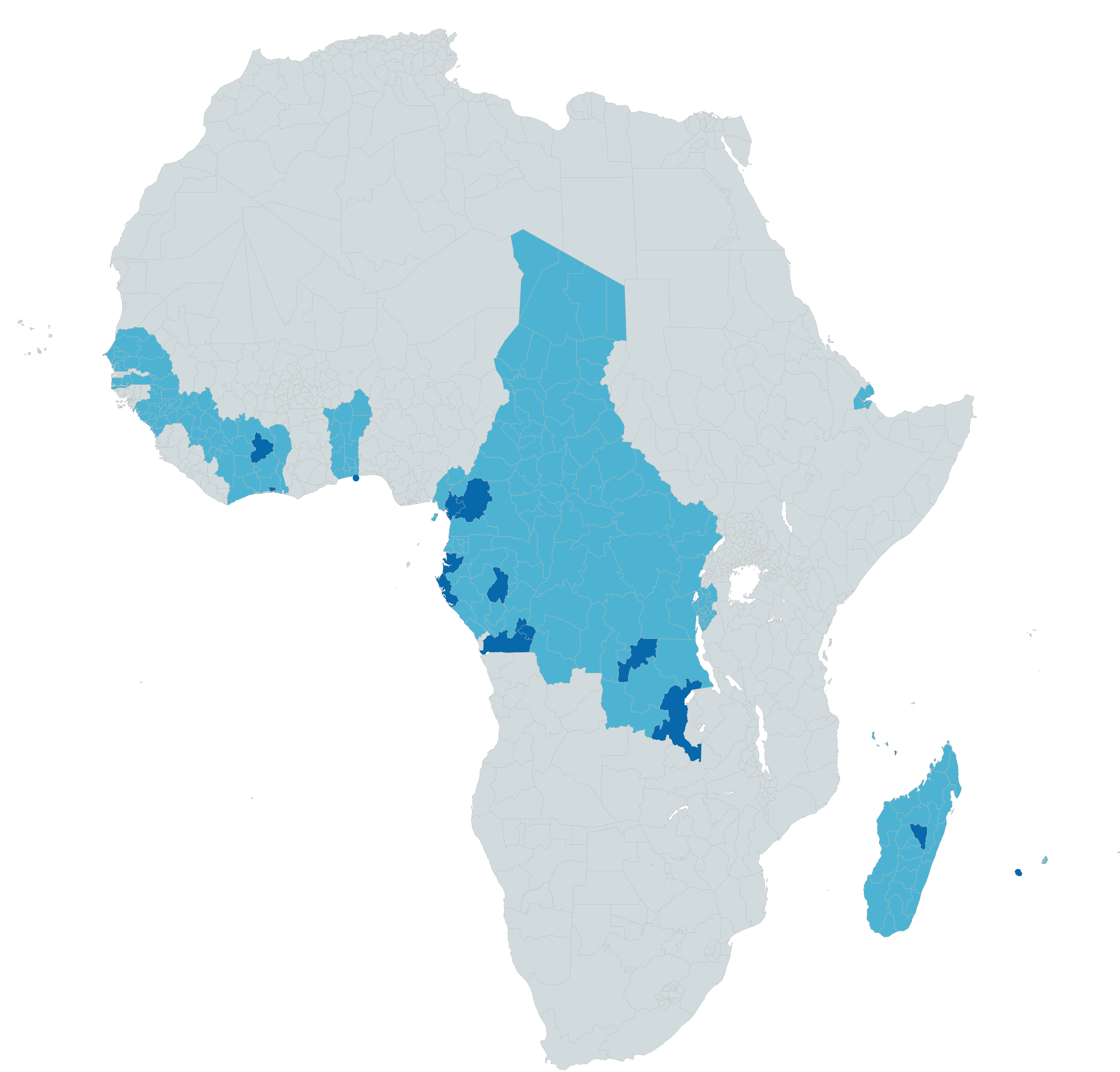
Status of French in Africa as of 2026: Countries in which it is an official de jure language Areas in which is spoken as a native language

French is an official language in 18 African countries, though it is not spoken as a first language by the majority, acting mainly as a second one or a lingua franca due to the many indigenous languages spoken in the territories. Despite this, it is increasingly being spoken as a native language among some communities in urban areas or the elite class. In contrast to Central Africa and most of West Africa, where French had been entrenched, countries in North Africa and the Sahel have generally distanced themselves from the language due to colonial connections; for example, Algeria intermittently attempted to remove the use of French in favor of a strong native language (see Arabization), and French has recently also been removed as an official language in Mali, Burkina Faso, and Niger in 2023, 2024, and 2025, respectively. Despite these changes and the emergence of English as a global lingua franca, French remains a major language in the societies of Morocco, Algeria and Tunisia, where it is a first language among the upper classes along with Arabic (many people in the upper classes are simultaneous bilinguals), but a second language among the general population.

=== Northern Africa ===
==== Algeria ====
In Algeria, 69.1% of the population over 15 in Alger, Constantine, Oran and Annaba can read and write French. According to a survey conducted in 2012, fewer than four in 10 Algerians identified with a Francophone identity. Conversely, speaking French was seen as essential by seven in 10, though a third of the population felt that the use of French is declining. In urban areas, the ability to speak fluent French is considered almost mandatory to find employment, especially in specialized white collar fields. French is the first foreign language in Algeria, and is introduced at the primary level. In higher education, French is the language of instruction in scientific and technical fields.

Francophone Algerians can be divided into three broad categories: 'real Francophones', who speak French as part of their daily lives and mostly come from a privileged background; 'casual Francophones', who use the language in certain contexts, alternating it with Arabic, and 'passive Francophones', who can understand French but do not speak it.

French television channels are widely watched in Algeria, and Algerian newspapers print their television schedules. Algeria also has a sizeable French-language press. A 2014 report published by the National Assembly of France describes it as the most important French-speaking country after France. Nevertheless, Algeria is not a member of the Francophonie. On social media, French was used on Facebook by 76% of Algerians in 2014.

French is not official, but The World Factbook cites it as the lingua franca of the country. The French language, restricted to an urban elite during the colonial period, began to expand as part of the mass education efforts launched after 1962. Its controversial status as a legacy of colonialism led to the increasing Arabisation of the school system in the 1970s and 1980s. The usage of French in the country reached its lowest point during the Algerian Civil War in the 1990s, when armed Islamist groups targeted teachers of French. The language has rebounded in public life since the end of the war, culminating in the efforts to reintroduce French in primary schools in 2006, which were initially hampered by a lack of sufficiently qualified teachers. Referring to the continued usage of French in Algeria in the post-colonial period, the writer Kateb Yacine described the French language as the 'spoils of war' (butin de guerre) of Algerians.

Local French-language media include El Watan, Le Soir d'Algérie, Liberté, Le Matin and Tout sur l'Algérie. According to a 2010 study by IMMAR Research & Consultancy, Francophone newspapers had a readership of 4,459,000 in the country, or 28% of the total, and a majority among readers with a high school or university education.

==== Egypt ====
The first French-medium school was established in Egypt in 1836, and the importance of French expanded throughout the second half of the 19th century, until it became the most common foreign language in the country. At the time, it was also a lingua franca for the communities of foreign origin, especially in Cairo.

During the period of the British colonization of Egypt French was actually the medium of communication among foreigners and between foreigners and Egyptians; the mixed French-Egyptian civil courts operated in French, and government notices from the Egyptian Sultan, taxi stand information, timetables of trains, and other legal documents were issued in French. This was partly because some Egyptians had French education and partly because of cultural influence from France. Despite efforts from British legal personnel, English was never adopted as a language of the Egyptian civil courts during the period of British influence.

French began to lose ground in Egyptian society in the 1920s for a number of political and social reasons; from the 1930s onwards English became the main foreign language, but French was still being learnt by 8 million Egyptians in 2013. There are two French-speaking universities in the country, the Université Française d'Égypte and the Université Senghor.

==== Mauritania ====
French was demoted from its status as an official language of Mauritania in 1991. Even so, it is taught from the second grade onward for up to six hours a week. French is also a language of instruction in high school for scientific subjects. In higher education, 2,300 students were enrolled in French courses in 2012. French remains, alongside Arabic, the language of work and education, although there were attempts to introduce English as a first foreign language. On social media, 59% of Mauritanian Facebook users used French on the website in 2014.

==== Morocco ====
The 2004 census of Morocco found that 39.5% of the population aged 10 and older could read and write French. Spoken mainly in cities among the upper middle class, French is the medium of instruction of two-thirds of courses in higher education, including science and technology, health, economics and management, although the adoption of English for this role was being considered by the Minister of Education. In the private sector, French is treated as more than simply a foreign language. French is introduced in primary school, where it is studied for up to 7 hours a week. It is also used as the language of education in many private schools. Moroccans are the largest group of foreign students in France, ahead of the Chinese and Algerians.

50.3% of the population over 15 in Tangier, Fez, Rabat, Casablanca and Marrakesh can read and write French. According to a survey conducted in 2012, just a third of urban Moroccans identify with a Francophone identity, and slightly more wish for French to become more commonly used. French is nevertheless deemed essential, both in the professional and private spheres, by three-quarters of respondents. French-language media are losing ground to Arabic media, including in television, radio or the press: of 618 Moroccan publications in 2004, 448 were in Arabic and 164 in French. On social media, French was used on Facebook by 75% of Moroccans in 2014.

Local French-language media include Le Matin du Sahara et du Maghreb, TelQuel, Aujourd'hui le Maroc, La Vie éco.

==== Tunisia ====
French is a working language in many sectors in Tunisia, including healthcare, commerce or communication. In coastal areas and the more developed neighbourhoods of the capital, it is also a common language of communication for all social groups, either in its standardised form or hybridised with Arabic. In the inland regions and the south it remains a foreign language. French is introduced from the third grade at 8 hours per week. In high school French is the language of instruction for mathematics, science and computing. Teachers are not always sufficiently trained for this usage, however.

Nearly three-quarters of the population of Tunis, Sousse and Sfax consider French as essential in their professional or personal lives. However, only half of the population feels Francophone, and only a third feels solidarity with other Francophone countries. 70.8% of the population over 15 in the aforementioned Tunisians cities can read and write French. Arabic increasingly dominates the Tunisian media landscape, especially on television: the audience share of local French-language channels reached 25% in the early 1990s, but hardly reached 3% by the 2010s. On social media, French was used on Facebook by 91% of Tunisians in 2014.

Local French-language media include La Presse de Tunisie, L'Economiste Maghrébin, Tunivisions, Le Temps.

=== Sub-Saharan Africa ===
French speakers in Africa in 2014: 0–10% Francophone 11–20% Francophone 21–30% Francophone 31–40% Francophone 41–50% Francophone >50% Francophone

According to the High Council of the International Organization of the Francophonie, in 2010, 96.2 million French speakers were living in various countries in Africa. French has been imported to most of these countries through colonization, and it is not a mother tongue to most residents. African standards of French differ from European ones. Some linguists discuss a "second French language" or even an "African French language".

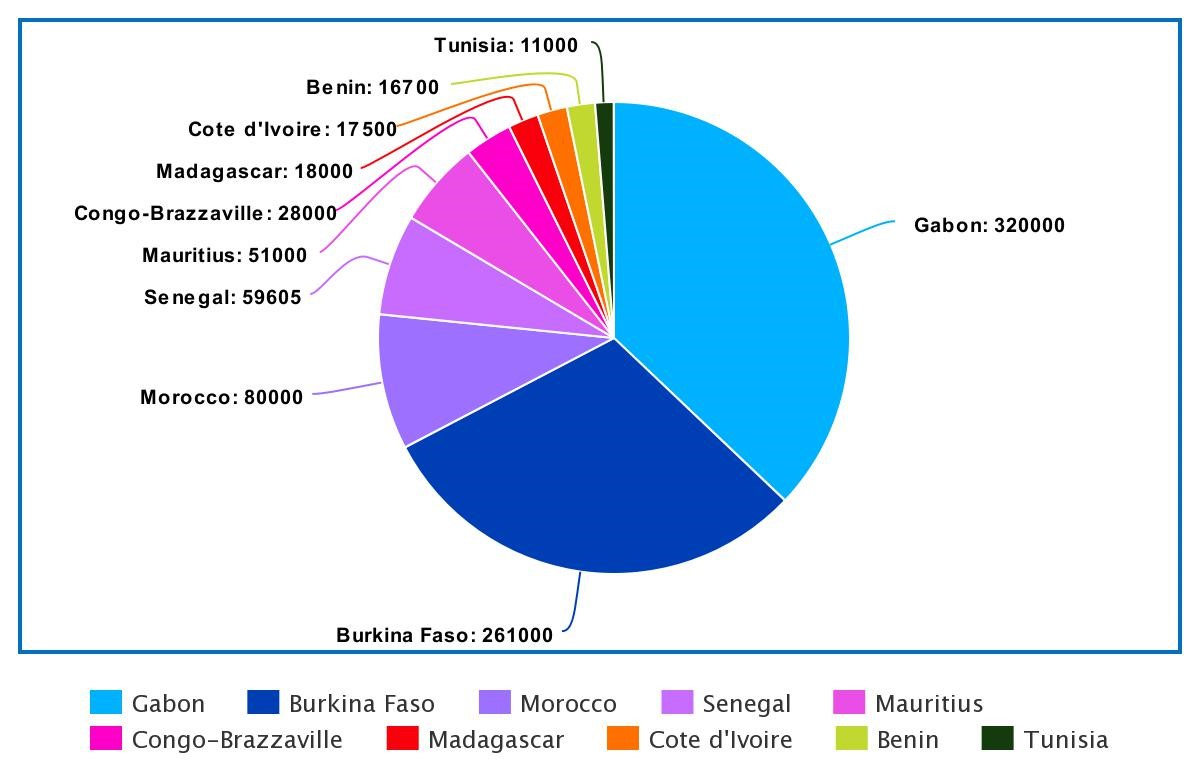
Native Speakers in Africa

According to Paul Wald, "The notion of ownership of an imported language begins when – despite its identification as a foreign and/or vernacular language – its use does not imply a relationship with the foreigner." French can thus be considered the result of functional and vernacular ownerships, satisfying the needs of a society with new sociocultural and socioeconomic realities. French has begun developing into almost independent varieties, with creation of different types of slang by speakers with a sufficient knowledge of French. Examples include the Ivorian jargon "Nouchi" in Abidjan and the Cameroonian "Camfranglais", which is a mixture of French and English with elements of indigenous languages.

==== Benin ====
French is the sole official language of Benin. According to a 2014 survey, 57.3% of residents of Cotonou over the age of 15 could read and write French. Knowledge of French is considered important for employment, bureaucracy, education but also in everyday life. 34% of the population was Francophone in 2002, up from 23% in 1992. There are strong regional differences, with the ability to speak French being more common in the south of the country. The Atlantique and Littoral departments have a French-speaking majority. French speakers are more commonly men than women, owing to a disparity in access to education.

==== Burkina Faso ====
French was the sole official language of Burkina Faso until December 2023. In Ouagadougou, 49.4% of the population aged 15 and older can read and write French. At the national level French was the first language for 1.66% of the population in 2006 (up from 0.75% in 1996), reaching 9.54% in the capital, where it is the second most spoken language, behind Dioula.

==== Burundi ====
Until 2014, French was one of two official languages of Burundi, the other being Kirundi. Only Kirundi is spoken by the vast majority of the population, therefore holding the status of national language as determined by article 5 of the Constitution.

==== Cameroon ====
French is one of two official languages of Cameroon, the other being English. French is the main language in eight of the ten regions of the country, with English being dominant in the remaining two. The vernacular form is Cameroonian French. French is the mother tongue of a vast proportion of young Cameroonians living in urban centers. In Cameroon, 63.7% of the population aged 15 and older in Douala and 60.5% in Yaoundé can read and write French; an additional 13–15% can speak French without being able to write it. To some extent, the language situation in Cameroon between French and English could be described fairly accurately as an exact inversion of the linguistic situation existing in Canada between English and French: Being spoken by 80% of the educated population (unlike English which is much less spoken), French predominates largely especially in government and information, even in English-speaking regions, which has led to the current uprising of the English-speaking minority living at the Nigerian border, which complains that English language is disappearing progressively under the pressure of the more numerous French speakers and that the linguistic rights of the English speakers are not respected, endangering their specific culture.

Camfranglais, a mixed language form formed mainly by Cameroonian French, Cameroonian English, Cameroonian Pidgin English, as well as with lexical composite elements from other languages of Cameroon.

==== Central African Republic ====
French is an official language of the Central African Republic along with Sango.

==== Chad ====
French is one of two official languages of Chad, together with Arabic. Half of the residents of N'Djamena feel solidarity towards other French-speaking countries and wishes for the use of French to expand. French is seen as important in work and education. French shares a place with Arabic as the language of administration and education, as well as in the press; French is dominant on radio and television. French is also spoken as part of daily life.

==== Comoros ====
French is one of two official languages of Comoros, Arabic being the second. On social media, French was used on Facebook by 100% of Comorians in 2014.

==== Congo-Brazzaville ====
French is the sole official language of Republic of Congo. Of the population of Brazzaville aged 15 and older, 68.7% can read and write French. French is the main language in the media, used by 63% of radio and television broadcasters. French is also the dominant language in the state administrations.

==== Congo-Kinshasa ====
French is the sole official language of Democratic Republic of Congo. About half of Kinshasa residents feel solidarity towards Francophone countries, and French is seen as important for education and relations with the government. It is also seen as important to be successful in life, along with English. French is the main language of education after third grade.

==== Djibouti ====
French is one of two official languages of Djibouti, the other being Arabic. On social media, French was used on Facebook by 82% of Djiboutians in 2014.

==== Gabon ====
French is the sole official language of Gabon. According to a 1999 survey, French was the first language for 26.3% of Libreville residents between the ages of 15 and 25. Of the capital's residents over 15 years of age, 71.9% could read and write French. Three quarters of the population of the capital identifies as Francophone and considers French as essential. All local publications are in French.

==== Guinea ====
French is the sole official language of Guinea. In Conakry, 42.1% of the population aged 15 and older can read and write French.

==== Ivory Coast ====
French is the sole official language of the Ivory Coast. In Abidjan, largest city of the country, 57.6% of the inhabitants over 15 can read and write French, and another 11% can speak it but not write it. The French language is seen as essential by a large majority, especially for dealing with the government and in education. Two thirds of respondents report feeling Francophone. French plays an important role in all areas of public and private life across the whole country. French is increasingly seen as an Ivorian language, and a local variety distinct from standard French has emerged (Ivorian French).

==== Madagascar ====
In Antananarivo, the capital of Madagascar, French is seen as important for work, education and administrative matters, but not in everyday life, where Malagasy dominates. Less than half feel solidarity with other Francophone countries or consider knowledge of French as essential. Education in primary schools is bilingual in Malagasy and French. The latter is used as medium of education for mathematics and scientific subjects. French is the language of instruction in secondary and tertiary education. It is also the main language of government, alongside Malagasy.

==== Niger ====
The official language of Niger is Hausa. French is the sole of diplomatic language of Niger. In Niamey, the capital, French is seen as essential for work, studies and administrative procedures. As of 2014 Two-thirds of residents believe that the use of French is becoming more common in the country.

==== Rwanda ====
French became the administrative language of Rwanda in 1916. The genocide against the Tutsi in 1994 and the victory of the Rwandan Patriotic Front were followed by a period of linguistic upheaval, with the return of refugees from Anglophone countries setting the stage for the officialisation of English in 1996 and the gradual usurpation of French as the language of education, culminating in the decision in October 2008 to make English the main language of education at higher levels, effectively relegating French to the status of third language. Nevertheless, a survey of students in Kigali found that French was known by a majority of them.

==== Senegal ====
French is the sole official language of Senegal. French was commonly spoken by 9.4% of Senegalese in 2002, mainly as a second language, with just 0.6% speaking it natively. Wolof is by far the most spoken language in the country, including the capital, while French remains a second language, becoming the main language only in non-Wolof areas. French is the main language of institutions, however. Only half of Dakar residents identify with a Francophone status or feel solidarity with French-speaking countries, but the French language is seen as essential for everyday affairs and education.

French was the language of literacy for 37.2% of the population in 2013, followed by Arabic at 11.1%. French is the main language of education in all regions of Senegal except for Kaffrine, where Arabic remains dominant, with significant Arabic-educated minorities in Kaolack (15.9% to 33.0% for French), Louga (15.8% to 22.7%) and Diourbel (15.0% to 17.2%). This phenomenon is explained by the impact of Quranic schools or Daara in those regions.

==== Togo ====
French is the sole official language of Togo. According to the 2010 census, 53% of the population over the age of 15 can read and write French.

== Americas ==
=== Caribbean ===
French language is spoken in the overseas departments of French Guiana and the French Antilles, including Guadeloupe, Martinique, and the islands formerly attached to Guadeloupe. There are over a million people living in these departments and collectivities.

French Creoles are also spoken on the islands of Dominica, St. Lucia, and to a more limited extent, Grenada.

==== Haiti ====
French is one of two official languages of Haiti, together with Haitian Creole, which is French-based. French is the language of culture and business in Haiti, and also the main language of institutions. French is used most by the elite and the middle class. Attempts to increase the legitimacy of Creole as an official language and in the media, on radio and television in particular, led to a relative decline in the share of French usage. Most teachers of French suffer from a low level of skills in the language, with nearly 85% achieving a level between A2 and B1 in the Test de connaissance du français (TCF) in 2009.

=== Northern America ===
==== Canada ====
French is the second most common language in Canada, after English, which are the two official languages of the Canadian federation. About 6,827,860 Canadians speak French as their first language, or around 20% of the country, with 2,065,300 constituting secondary speakers. Bilingualism with French has been declining in English Canada in recent years.

Provincially, French is the sole official language of the province of Quebec, being the mother tongue for some 7 million people, or almost 80.1 percent (2006 Census) of the province. About 95 percent of the people of Quebec speak French as either a first or second language. English and French are the official languages of New Brunswick, where bilingualism is constitutionally and statutorily enacted. In 2016, approximately 32 per cent of New Brunswick claims French as their mother tongue. More than three-quarters of francophones in New Brunswick resides in the eastern portion of the province. English and French are also constitutionally recognized as the official languages of Manitoba's legislative and judicial branches. In 2016, more than 43,000 Manitobans (3.4 per cent of the province's population) claims French as their mother tongue. Franco-Manitobans are primarily concentrated in southern Manitoba, along corridors that follows the Seine and the Red River of the North; with 80 per cent of Franco-Manitobans residing in Eastman or the Winnipeg Capital Region.

French is also an official language of all three territories (Northwest Territories, Nunavut, and Yukon), along with English and, in Northwest Territories and Nunavut, multiple Aboriginal languages. Out of the three, Yukon has the most French speakers, comprising just under 4 per cent of the population.

French is also an official language of Ontario's legislature and judiciary, with access to a French judiciary being viewed as quasi-constitutional right in that province. French language rights are also statutorily enacted to certain regions of Ontario, under the French Language Services Act. More than 600,000 francophones reside in Ontario (approximately 4.7 per cent of the population), constituting the largest French-speaking community in Canada outside Quebec. Over 40 per cent of Franco-Ontarians reside in Eastern Ontario, with more than half of that population living in communities close to the Ontario-Quebec border. Central and northeastern Ontario also holds significant populations of Franco-Ontarians, with francophones making up over 22 per cent of northeastern Ontario's population.

==== United States ====
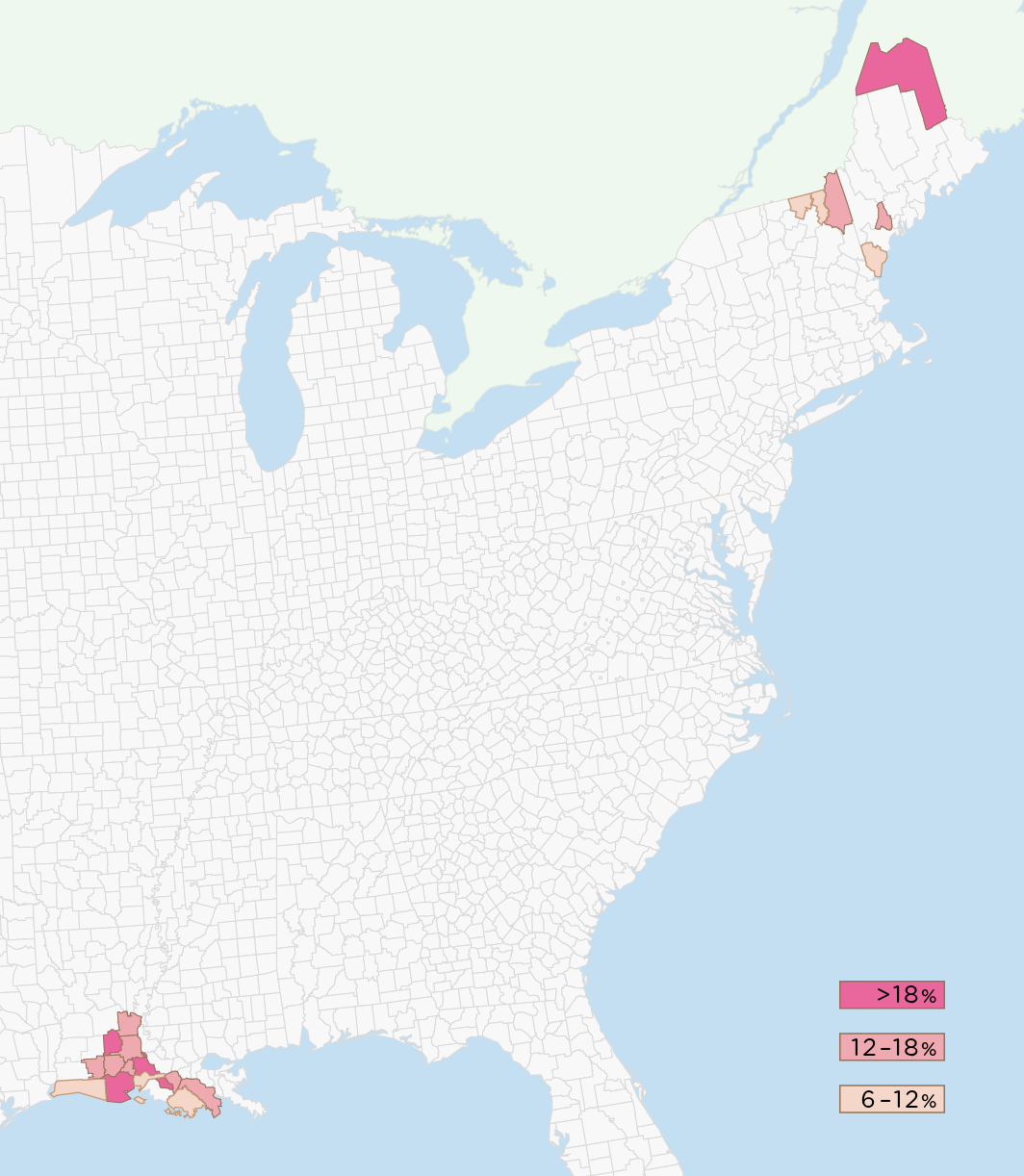
French language spread in the United States

According to the U.S. Census Bureau (2011), French is the fourth most-spoken language in the United States after English, Spanish, and Chinese, when all forms of French are considered together and all languages of Chinese are similarly combined. French remains the second most-spoken language in the states of Louisiana and Maine.

Louisiana is home to many distinct dialects, collectively known as Louisiana French. Cajun French has the largest number of speakers, mostly living in Acadiana. According to the 2000 United States census, there are over 194,000 people in Louisiana who speak French at home, the most of any state if Louisiana Creole is excluded. In October 2018, Louisiana became the first U.S. state to join the Organisation Internationale de la Francophonie. New England French, essentially a variant of Canadian French, is spoken in parts of New England.

Missouri French, Muskrat French and Métis French were historically spoken by descendants of habitants, voyageurs and coureurs des bois in various parts of New France, but are now endangered languages.

=== South America ===
==== Brazil ====
The anti-Portuguese factor of Brazilian nationalism in the 19th century led to an increased use of the French language to the detriment of Portuguese, as France was seen at the time as a model of civilization and progress. The learning of French has historically been important and strong among the Lusophone high societies, and for a great span of time, it was also the main foreign language among the middle class of both Portugal and Brazil, but now trails English, in both, and more recently, Spanish, in the latter.

== Asia ==
=== Cambodia ===
About 3% of the population of Cambodia can speak French as of 2014. Most of these speakers tend to be older since they grew up when Cambodia was a colony of France. This population has remained relatively stable, although English has begun to take shape. French continues to remain an administrative language on many governmental and business offices. French is also a significant discipline in schools as the royal family continues to learn French.

=== China ===
In China, the language was also spoken by the elite in the Shanghai French Concession and other concessions in Guangzhou (Shamian Island), Hankou, Tianjin, Kouang-Tchéou-Wan and in the French zone of influence over the provinces of Yunnan, Guangxi, Hainan, and Guangdong. French is seen as important for doing business in Africa in particular, and 6,000 students attended French courses in 2013. A total of 29,000 study French in one of the Alliance française establishments, and 20,000 more study it in private language schools or academies, while 35,000 Chinese people are studying in France.

==== Hong Kong ====
The French Consulate estimated there are 8,000 native French speakers in Hong Kong, of which approximately 6,000 are French citizens. Moreover, 50,000 people is estimated to occasionally practice French, while 2% of Hong Kong's total population of 7 million have studied the language. French is one of the two foreign languages (Mandarin and French) that can be taken in the Hong Kong Certificate of Education (HKCEE).

It is one of the largest French communities in Asia.

=== India ===
French was used previously during French colonization as the official language in areas of Pondicherry, Karikal and Chandannagar as they were former French colonies. French is still spoken in Pondicherry today without much resistance from locals.

=== Lebanon ===
As the Lebanese people historically call France la tendre mère (English: The Tender Mother), not only is speaking French in Lebanon common and encouraged, but it is also a self-identification with the French liberal and cultural spirit that was mainly the result of the French colonial period and educational, Christian religious and governmental enterprises. However, most Lebanese privilege French out of fascination and infatuation with the culture, not for any functional purposes.

Article 11 of Lebanon's Constitution states that "Arabic is the official national language, a law determines the cases in which the French language is to be used".

Today, French and English are secondary languages of Lebanon, with about 40% of the population being Francophone and 40% Anglophone. The use of English is growing in the business and media environment. Out of about 900,000 students, about 500,000 are enrolled in Francophone schools, public or private, in which the teaching of mathematics and scientific subjects is provided in French. Actual usage of French varies depending on the region and social status. One third of high school students educated in French go on to pursue higher education in English-speaking institutions. English is the language of business and communication, with French being an element of social distinction, chosen for its emotional value. On social media, French was used on Facebook by just 10% of Lebanese in 2014, far behind English (78%).

=== Laos ===
About 3% of the population of Laos can speak French as of 2014. French is an administrative language in Laos. Laos has the second largest Francophone community in Southeast Asia after Vietnam and ahead of Cambodia.

Over 35% of Lao students study French in schools, and the language can be commonly found on many government buildings. Luang Phrabang is also home to many French restaurants, bakeries, cafes, and bars that still use French. The language is still the language of business, tourism, fashion, and industry in many sectors of higher education. Laos continues to use French on many street signs without much intervention from English.

=== Philippines ===
The Philippines has become one of the most active areas where French is being studied. Home of the first Alliance française in Southeast Asia (founded in 1912), it continues to educate many Filipinos and expatriates in the language. There are currently two branches of Alliance Française in the Philippines, that of Manila and Cebu.

Although the language is not offered in elementary school, President Gloria Macapagal Arroyo issued a proclamation encouraging the language to be an elective in high school. Also, French, along with Spanish, is a popular foreign language offered in many universities in the country. The University of the Philippines offers a bachelor's degree in European languages, with French as one of the possible majors.

=== Singapore ===
In Singapore, the top 10% of Primary School Leaving Examination graduates may choose to opt for French as a second or third language in secondary school, although the language is not an official language in Singapore and is not commonly spoken among locals.

=== Syria ===
Syria, as well as Lebanon, was a French League of Nations mandate following World War I, which put French as one of the main official languages in Syria. Following independence, French was demoted as the official language of Syria, but it remained taught alongside English in schools as the second foreign language. Just 10,000 French speakers remain in Syria today.

French is mostly popular in the cities of Damascus and Aleppo, where the Lycée Français Charles de Gaulle and l’École Française, Syria's only two French schools, are located respectively. In 2016, a new French school opened in Tartous, increasing the total number to three.

=== Vietnam ===
French was the official language of Vietnam under French colonial rule from the mid-19th to mid-20th century. After the partition of Vietnam in 1954, French fell into disuse in North Vietnam, and maintained a high status in South Vietnam. Since the fall of Saigon in 1975, French has declined in modern Vietnam: in 2018, slightly under 1% of the population was fluent in French.

About 0.7% of the population of Vietnam can speak French as of 2014.

Official figures in 2019 estimate that about 675,000 Vietnamese are fluent in French, many of whom are older individuals educated during the colonial era. Its usage in everyday life has greatly declined since 1975, however, with the number of people using French on a regular basis being between 5,000 and 6,000.

Vietnam is the largest Francophone country in Asia and is a member of the Organisation internationale de la Francophonie (OIF). Since the 1990s, the Vietnamese government, in cooperation with the French government, has promoted French-language education in the country's schooling system, acknowledging the cultural and historic value of the French language. The language also continues to be used as a prestige language in certain professional sectors. Many areas of the Vietnamese language also have French influences, and the food of Vietnam was inspired off of the French, such as banh mi.

== Europe ==
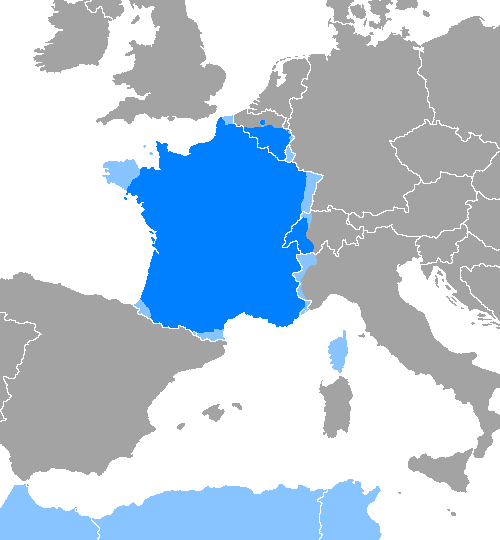
Distribution of the French language in Europe

Spoken by 12% of the EU population, French is the second most widely spoken mother tongue in the European Union, after German; it is also the third most widely known language of the Union, after English and German (33% of the EU population report to know how to speak English, whilst 22% of Europeans understand German and 20% French).

=== Belgium ===
In Belgium, French is an official language in Wallonia and Brussels. French is the primary language of Wallonia (excluding a part of the East Cantons, which are German-speaking) and in the Brussels-Capital Region, where it is spoken by the majority of the population often as their primary language. In the Flemish Region French is not an official language, with the exception of a dozen municipalities with language facilities for French speakers along borders with the Walloon and Brussels-Capital regions.

In total, native French speakers make up about 38% of the country's population. Including speakers of French as a second language, about 72% of the Belgian population can speak French.

=== France ===
French formally became the official language of France in 1992. As it is the country where French began, 95.8% of the population speaks French.

=== Germany ===
In Germany, in 2024 there are 6% of people who speak French. It is the 11th country of speakers in Europe.

=== Guernsey ===
In Guernsey, English is the only official language, although French is sometimes used in legislation with a ceremonial capacity. Nevertheless, Norman (in its local forms, Guernésiais and Jèrriais) is the historical vernacular of the islands.

=== Italy ===
The Aosta Valley was the first government authority to adopt Modern French as working language in 1536, three years before France itself. French has been the official language of the Aosta Valley since 1561, when it replaced Latin. In the 1861 census, the first held after the unification of Italy, 93% declared being Francophone; in 1921, the last census with a question about language found that 88% of the population was French-speaking. The suppression of all French-language schools and institutions and violence against French speakers during the forceful Italianisation campaign of the Fascist government irretrievably damaged the status of French in the region. Italian and French are nowadays the region's official languages and are used for the regional government's acts and laws, though Italian is much more widely spoken in everyday life, and French is mostly used within cultural events. Though French was re-introduced as an official language after World War II, and by 2003 just 0.99% reported speaking French natively. French remains widely known as a second language, but it is no longer spoken as part of daily life. In 2001, 75.41% of the Valdostan population declared to know French, 96.01% declared to know Italian, 55.77% Franco-Provençal, and 50.53% all of them. School education is delivered equally in both Italian and French so that everyone who went to school in Aosta Valley can speak French to at least a medium-high level.

=== Jersey ===
In Jersey, a standardized variety of French called Jersey Legal French is an official language. However, its use is generally restricted to parliament formalities or legal codes and contracts.

=== Luxembourg ===
French is one of three official languages of the Grand Duchy of Luxembourg, alongside German and Luxembourgish, the natively spoken language of Luxembourg. French is primarily used for administrative purposes by the government, is the language in which laws are published since the law of 1984 and is also the primary language used to converse with foreigners. Luxembourg's education system is trilingual: the first cycle of basic school is in Luxembourgish, before changing officially to German for most branches; while in secondary school, the language of instruction changes to French for most subjects, such as mathematics and science. At the Luxembourg University courses are offered in French, German and English.

=== Switzerland ===
French is one of the four official languages of Switzerland (along with German, Italian and Romansh) and is spoken in the western part of Switzerland called Romandie, of which Geneva is the largest city. The language divisions in Switzerland do not coincide with political subdivisions and some cantons have bilingual status for example, cities such Biel/Bienne or cantons such as Valais-Fribourg-Berne. French is the native language of about 20% of the Swiss population and is spoken by 50.4% of the population.

=== United Kingdom ===
French is the most popular foreign language studied in British schools. According to a 2006 European Commission report, 23% of UK residents are able to carry on a conversation in French. Other surveys put the figure at 15%.

== See also ==
- Francophone
- List of territorial entities where French is an official language
- Organisation internationale de la Francophonie
- French-based creole languages
- Anglophone
- Arabophone
- Geographical distribution of German speakers
- Hispanophone
- Indosphere
- Lusophone
- Persophone
- Russophone
- Sinophone
- List of link languages
- Dialect continuum
- Geolinguistics
- Language geography
