= Biggy 237 =

Season of television series

- Also known as: Big Brother Cameroon
- Presented by: T-Jay; Tito Valery; Vicky Fokala
- Country of origin: Cameroon
- Original languages: English, French, Camfranglais, Pidgin
- No. of series: 2

Production
- Producer: Fred K

Original release
- Network: Biggy TV
- Release: 2 August 2020 – 2021

Biggy 237 (self-proclaimed "Big Brother Cameroon") is a Cameroonian reality competition created in 2020 by a patriotic Cameroonian with a love for show biz whose identity we got as Fred K. The show aimed at nurturing talents and inspiring hope in young Cameroonians and also aimed at bringing Anglophone and Francophone Cameroonians together.

The show looks like a pirated edition of Big Brother and it does not hold the license of Big Brother franchise. However, followers of the show and medias still using "Big Brother Cameroon" as the promotional name. And also, "Biggie" is the word that the housemates and productions call Big Brother in Big Brother Naija.

The show features 25 contestants live in the ‘Biggy's Mansion’ from 2 August 2020,

competed to win FCFA10 million (equivalent to $18,102), a car, as well as other prizes including a trip to Dubai.

All contestants were tested for COVID-19 as well as HIV, Hepatitis, Chlamydia and other medical tests. They were also placed on quarantine since 18 July 2020.

While in the Biggy‘s mansion, the contestants are expected to express themselves in English (on Mondays and Saturdays), French (Tuesdays and Fridays), Pidgin (Wednesdays), Camfranglais (Thursdays), and English and French (Sundays).

The organizers have created a Biggy TV HD channel on BT Media Group to broadcast the show to the public. The show is also widely watched international via Facebook and YouTube and the viewers are expected to vote for their favourite contestants.
