= African French =

Set of varieties of the French Language

- français africain
- Region: Africa
- Speakers: L1: 1.2 million (2021); L1 and L2: 167 million (2024)
- Language family: Indo-European: Italic; Latino-Faliscan; Latin; Romance; Italo-Western; Western Romance; Gallo-Iberian; Gallo-Romance; Gallo-Rhaetian?; Arpitan–Oïl; Oïl; French; African French
- Early forms: Old Latin: Vulgar Latin; Proto-Romance; Old French; Middle French
- Dialects: West African French; Maghreb French; Djiboutian French; Indian Ocean French; Eastern African French
- Writing system: Latin (French alphabet); French Braille

Official status
- Official language in: Countries: Benin; Burundi; Cameroon; Central African Republic; Chad; Comoros; Congo; Djibouti; DR Congo; Equatorial Guinea; Gabon; Guinea; Ivory Coast; Madagascar; Rwanda; Senegal; Seychelles; Togo; Dependent entities: Mayotte; Réunion

Language codes
- ISO 639-3: –
- IETF: fr-002
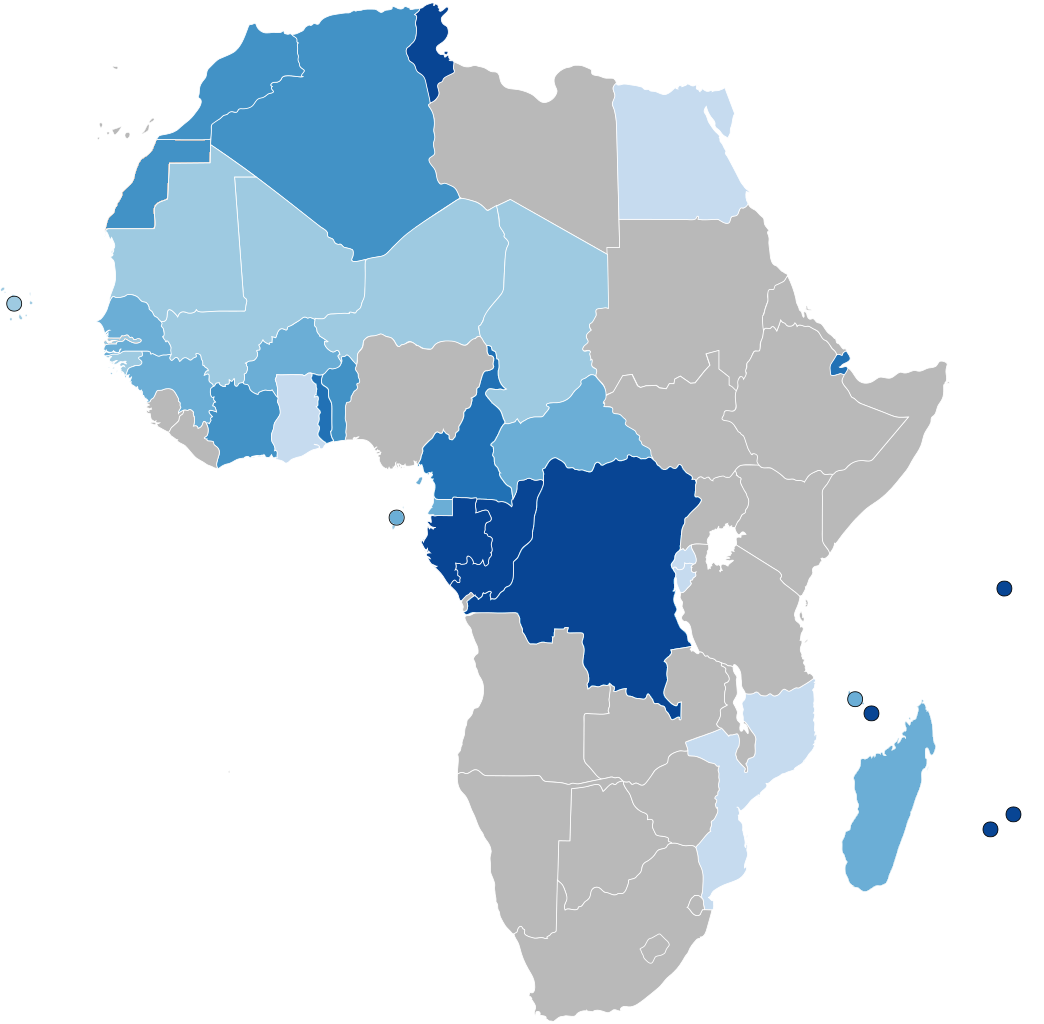
- Countries of Africa by percentage of French speakers in 2023, also including non-official de jure status: 0–10% Francophone 11–20% Francophone 21–30% Francophone 31–40% Francophone 41–50% Francophone >50% Francophone

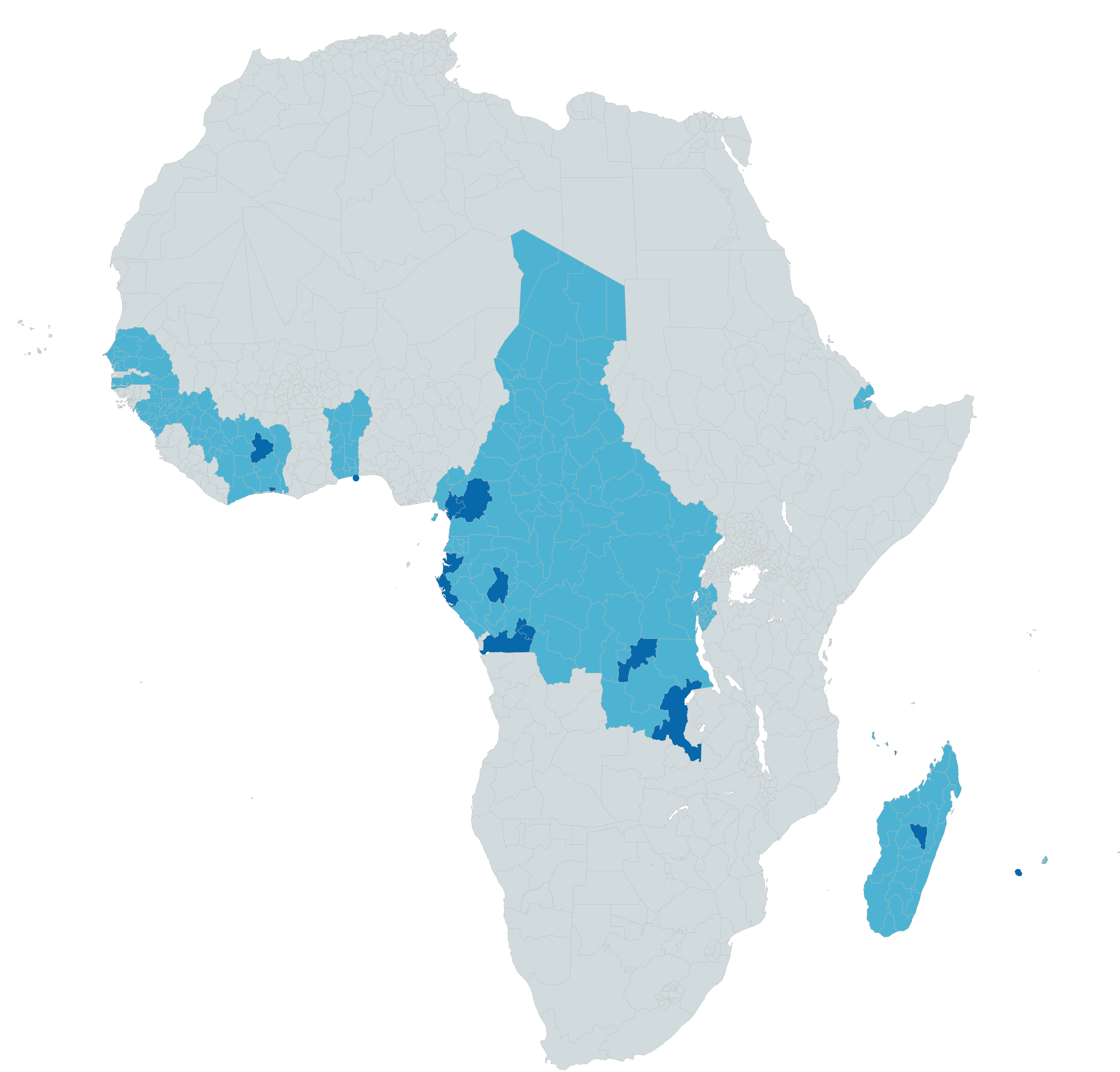
- Official status and native speakers as of 2025: Countries in which it is an official de jure language Areas and regions in which it is spoken as a first language

A man from Labé, Guinea, speaking Pular and West African French

African French (French: français africain) is the umbrella grouping of varieties of the French language spoken throughout Francophone Africa. Used mainly as a secondary language or lingua franca, it is spoken by an estimated 167 million people across 34 countries and territories, (Note: 29 full members of the Organisation internationale de la Francophonie (OIF): Benin, Burkina Faso, Burundi, Cameroon, Cape Verde, Central African Republic, Chad, Comoros, DR Congo, Republic of the Congo, Djibouti, Egypt, Equatorial Guinea, Gabon, Guinea, Guinea-Bissau, Ivory Coast, Madagascar, Mali, Mauritania, Mauritius, Morocco, Niger, Rwanda, São Tomé and Príncipe, Senegal, Seychelles, Togo, and Tunisia. One associate member of the OIF: Ghana. One observer of the OIF: Mozambique. One country not member or observer of the OIF: Algeria. Two French territories in Africa: Réunion and Mayotte.) some of which are not Francophone, but merely members or observers of the Organisation internationale de la Francophonie. Of these, 18 sovereign states recognize it as an official de jure language, though it is not the native tongue of the majority. According to Ethnologue, only 1.2 million people spoke it as a first language. African French speakers represent 47% of the Francophonie, making Africa the continent with the most French speakers in the world.

In Africa, French is often spoken as a second language alongside the Indigenous ones, but in a small number of urban areas (in particular in Central Africa and in the ports located on the Gulf of Guinea) it has become a first language, such as in the region of Abidjan, Ivory Coast, the Democratic Republic of the Congo, in the urban areas of Douala, Yaoundé in Cameroon, in Libreville, Gabon, and Antananarivo, Madagascar.

In some countries, though not having official de jure status, it is a first language among a small social classes of the population, such as in Algeria, Tunisia, Morocco, and Mauritania, where French is a first language among the upper classes along with Arabic (many people in the upper classes are simultaneous bilinguals in Arabic/French), but only a second language among the general population.

In each of the Francophone African countries, French is spoken with local variations in pronunciation and vocabulary.

== List of countries in Africa by French proficiency ==
French proficiency in African countries according to the Organisation internationale de la Francophonie (OIF). (Note: Countries in italics indicate non-Francophone countries.)

Countries	Total population	French speaking population	Percentage of the population that speaks French	Year
Algeria	47,435,000	15,589,000	32.86%	2025
Benin	14,814,000	4,992,000	33.7%	2025
Burkina Faso	24,075,000	5,499,000	22.84%	2025
Burundi	14,390,000	1,250,000	8.68%	2025
Cameroon	29,879,000	12,267,000	41.06%	2025
Cape Verde	527,000	52,000	10.83%	2025
Central African Republic	5,513,000	1,345,000	24.39%	2025
Chad	21,004,000	2,693,000	12.82%	2025
Comoros	883,000	333,000	37.73%	2025
Congo	6,484,000	3,981,000	61.4%	2025
Djibouti	1,184,000	592,000	50%	2025
DR Congo	112,832,000	57,196,000	50.69%	2025
Egypt	118,366,000	3,573,000	3.02%	2025
Equatorial Guinea	1,938,000	560,000	28.91%	2025
Gabon	2,593,000	1,719,000	66.3%	2025
Gambia	2,822,000	564,000	20.00%	2025
Ghana	35,064,000	645,000	1.84%	2025
Guinea	15,100,000	4,202,000	27.83%	2025
Guinea-Bissau
Ivory Coast	32,712,000	11,913,000	36.42%	2025
Madagascar	32,741,000	8,705,000	26.59%	2025
Mali	25,199,000	5,028,000	19.95%	2025
Mauritania	5,315,000	689,000	12.96%	2025
Mauritius	1,268,000	921,000	72.65%	2025
Morocco	38,431,000	13,912,000	36.2%	2025
Niger	27,918,000	3,754,000	13.45%	2025
Rwanda	14,569,000	748,000	5.14%	2025
São Tomé and Príncipe
Senegal	18,932,000	5,250,000	27.73%	2025
Seychelles	133,000	70,000	53.00%	2025
Togo	9,722,000	3,998,000	41.12%	2025
Tunisia	12,349,000	6,558,000	53.11%	2025

== Status ==
=== Official status ===
Country	Notes
Benin	Sole official
Congo, Democratic Republic of	Sole official
Congo, Republic of	Sole official
Gabon	Sole official
Guinea	Sole official
Ivory Coast	Sole official
Senegal	Sole official
Togo	Sole official
Burundi	Co-official with Kirundi, English
Cameroon	Co-official with English
Chad	Co-official with Arabic
Central African Republic	Co-official with Sango
Comoros	Co-official with Comorian, Arabic
Djibouti	Co-official with Arabic
Equatorial Guinea	Co-official with Spanish, Portuguese
Madagascar	Co-official with Malagasy
Rwanda	Co-official with Kinyarwanda, English, Swahili
Seychelles	Co-official with English, Seychellois Creole

=== Non-official but often administrative or cultural ===
Country	Official languages	Usage of French
Algeria	Arabic, Algerian Tamazight	Administrative, commercial, cultural, educational
Burkina Faso	Mooré, Dyula, Fula	Working language. Removed as an official language in 2024
Mali	Bambara, Bobo, Hassaniya Arabic, Bozo, Dogon, Toro So, Fula, Kassonke, Maninke, Minyanka,Senufo, Senara, Songhay, Koyraboro Senni, Soninke, Tamasheq	Working language, commercial, educational. Removed as an official language in 2023
Mauritania	Arabic	Used in the media, business, and among educated classes
Mauritius	None de jure	De facto official with English, used in government administration, courts, and business
Morocco	Arabic, Moroccan Tamazight	Administrative, commercial, cultural, educational
Niger	Hausa	Administrative, commercial, educational. Removed as an official language in 2025
Tunisia	Arabic	Administrative, commercial, cultural, educational

== Varieties ==
There are many different varieties of African French, but they can be broadly grouped into five categories:

1. The French variety spoken in Central Africa and West Africa including Angola with French ancestry or French residents who speak French especially in Cabinda – spoken altogether by about 97 million people in 2018, as either a first or second language.
2. The French variety spoken by Berbers and Maghrebis in North-west Africa (see Maghreb French), which has about 33 million first and second language speakers in 2018.
3. The French variety spoken in the Comoro Islands (the Comoros and Mayotte) and Madagascar, which have 5.6 million first and second language speakers in 2018.
4. The French variety spoken by Creoles in the Mascarene Islands (Mauritius and Réunion) and Seychelles, which has around 1.75 million first and second language speakers in 2018. The French spoken in this region is not to be confused with the French-based creole languages, which are also spoken in the area.
5. The French variety spoken in Djibouti in the Horn of Africa, which has about 0.5 million first and second language speakers in 2018.

All the African French varieties differ from Standard French, both in terms of pronunciation and vocabulary, but the formal African French used in education, media and legal documents is based on standard French vocabulary.

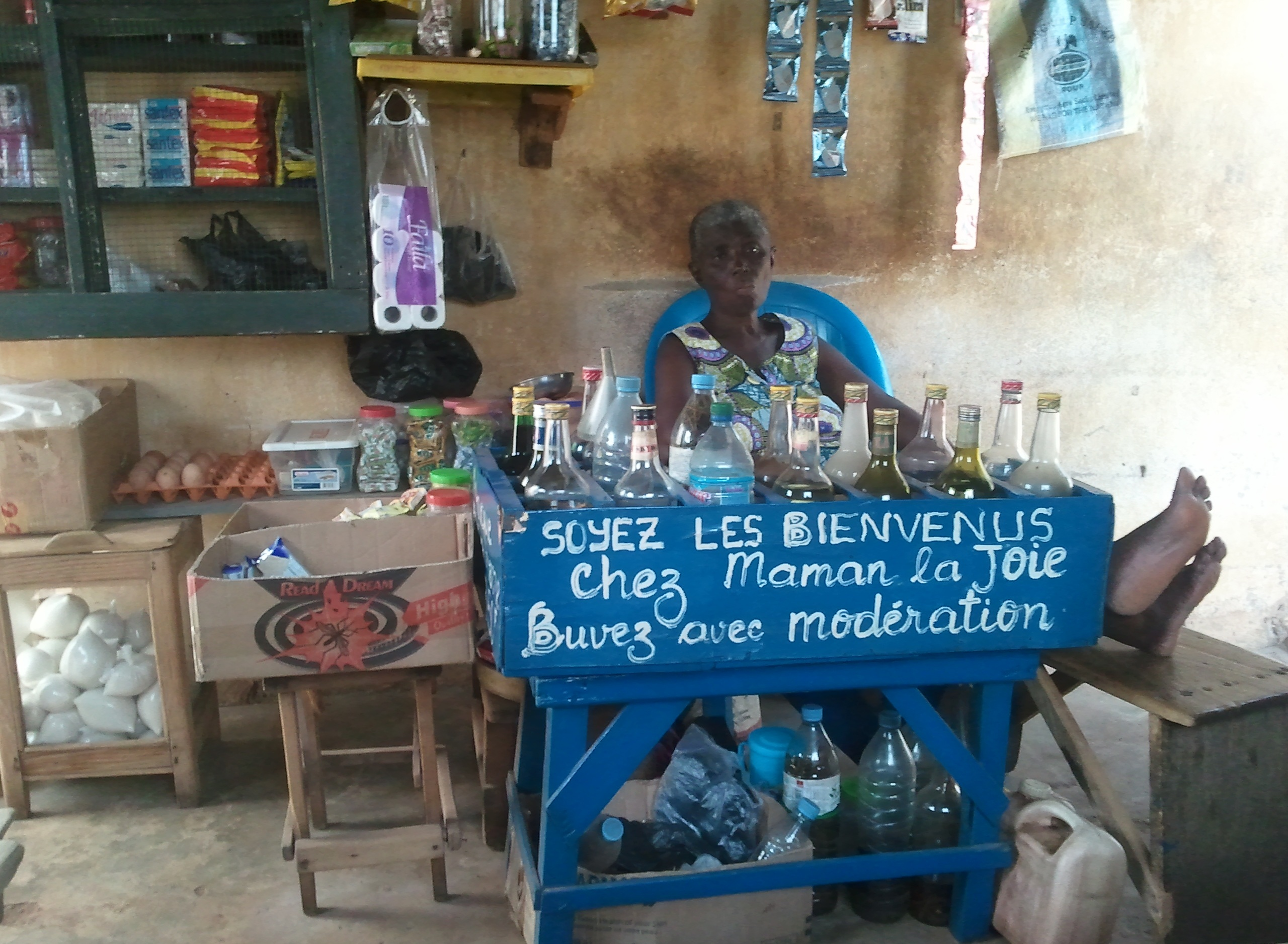
Alcohol seller in Kara, Togo, with sign in French; she uses the phrase Soyez les bienvenus ("Be welcome"), considered an archaic phrase in Metropolitan France; some terms and words persist in use in Africa after falling out of use in France.

In the colonial period, a vernacular form of creole French known as Petit nègre ("little negro") was also present in West Africa. The term has since, however, become a pejorative term for "poorly spoken" African French.

In Angola, French is spoken in Angola especially Cabinda, particularly in the northern regions. While Portuguese is the official language, French is understood and spoken, especially among the Kongo people in the north and by Angolans with French ancestry. It's also one of the foreign languages taught in schools with 90% speak French from neighboring DR Congo as a legacy of Belgian colonial rule which established as Belgium's private colony of Francophone Africa until its independence on 30 June 1960.

Code-switching, or the alternation of languages within a single conversation, takes place in both DR Congo and Senegal, the former having four "national" languages – Ciluba, Kikongo, Lingala, and Swahili – which are in a permanent opposition to French. Code-switching has been studied since colonial times by different institutions of linguistics. One of these, located in Dakar, Senegal, already spoke of the creolization of French in 1968, naming the result "franlof": a mix of French and Wolof (the language most spoken in Senegal) which spreads by its use in urban areas and through schools, where teachers often speak Wolof in the classroom despite official instructions.

The omnipresence of local languages in Francophone African countries – along with insufficiencies in education – has given birth to a new linguistic concept: le petit français. Le petit français is the result of a superposition of the structure of a local language with a narrowed lexical knowledge of French. The specific structures, though very different, are juxtaposed, marking the beginning of the creolization process.

Some African countries such as Algeria intermittently attempted to remove the use of French; it was removed as an official language in Mali, Burkina Faso, and Niger in 2023, 2024, and 2025 respectively.

== Français populaire africain ==
In the urban areas of Francophone Africa, another type of French has emerged: Français populaire africain ("Popular African French") or FPA. It is used in the entirety of Sub-Saharan Africa, but especially in cities such as Abidjan, Ivory Coast; Cotonou, Benin; Dakar, Senegal; Lomé, Togo; and Ouagadougou, Burkina Faso. At its emergence, it was marginalized and associated with the ghetto; Angèle Bassolé-Ouedraogo describes the reaction of the scholars:

Administration and professors do not want to hear that funny-sounding and barbarian language that seems to despise articles and distorts the sense of words. They see in it a harmful influence to the mastery of good French.

However, FPA has begun to emerge as a second language among the upper class. It has also become a symbol of social acceptance.

FPA can be seen as a progressive evolution of Ivorian French. After diffusing out of Ivory Coast it became Africanized under the influence of young Africans (often students) and cinema, drama, and dance.

FPA has its own grammatical rules and lexicon. For example, "Il ou elle peut me tuer!" or "Il ou elle peut me dja!" can either mean "This person annoys me very much (literally he or she is annoying me to death)" or "I'm dying (out of love) for him/her" depending on the circumstances. "Il ou elle commence à me plaire" signifies a feeling of exasperation (whereupon it actually means "he or she starts to appeal to me"), and friendship can be expressed with "c'est mon môgô sûr" or "c'est mon bramôgo."

FPA is mainly composed of metaphors and images taken from African languages. For example, the upper social class is called "les en-haut d'en-haut" (the above from above) or "les môgôs puissants" (the powerful môgôs).

=== Pronunciation ===
Pronunciation in the many varieties of African French can be quite varied. There are nonetheless some trends among African French speakers; for instance, ⟨r⟩ tends to be pronounced as the historic alveolar trill of pre-20th Century French instead of the now standard uvular trill or 'guttural R.' The voiced velar fricative, the sound represented by ⟨غ⟩ in the Arabic word مغرب Maghrib, is another common alternative. Pronunciation of the letters ⟨d⟩, ⟨t⟩, and ⟨l⟩ may also vary, and intonation may differ from standard French.

== Abidjan French ==
According to some estimates, French is spoken by 75 to 99 percent of Abidjan's population, either alone or alongside indigenous African languages. There are three sorts of French spoken in Abidjan. A formal French is spoken by the educated classes. Most of the population, however, speaks a colloquial form of French known as français de Treichville (after a working-class district of Abidjan) or français de Moussa (after a character in chronicles published by the magazine Ivoire Dimanche which are written in this colloquial Abidjan French). Finally, an Abidjan French slang called Nouchi has evolved from an ethnically neutral lingua franca among uneducated youth into a creole language with a distinct grammar. New words often appear in Nouchi and then make their way into colloquial Abidjan French after some time. As of 2012, a crowdsourced dictionary of Nouchi was being written using mobile phones.

Here are some examples of words used in the African French variety spoken in Abidjan (the spelling used here conforms to French orthography, except ô which is pronounced [ɔ]):

- une go is a slang word meaning a girl or a girlfriend. It is a loanword either from the Mandinka language or from English ("girl"). It is also French hip-hop slang for a girl.
- un maquis is a colloquial word meaning a street-side eatery, a working-class restaurant serving African food (likely from French “marquise”).
- un bra-môgô is a slang word equivalent to "bloke" or "dude" in English. It is a loanword from the Mandinka language.
- chicotter is a word meaning to whip, to beat, or to chastise (children). It is a loanword from Portuguese "chicotear", also meaning "to whip". It has now entered the formal language of the educated classes.
- le pia is a slang word meaning money. It comes perhaps from the standard French word pièce ("coin") or pierre ("stone"), or perhaps piastre (dollar, buck).

When speaking in a formal context, or when meeting French speakers from outside Ivory Coast, Abidjan speakers would replace these local words with the French standard words une fille, un restaurant or une cantine, un copain, battre and l'argent respectively. Note that some local words are used across several African countries. For example, chicotter is attested not only in Ivory Coast but also in Senegal, Mali, Niger, Burkina Faso, Chad, the Central African Republic, Benin, Togo and the Democratic Republic of the Congo.

As already mentioned, these local words range from slang to formal usage, and their use therefore varies depending on the context. In Abidjan, this is how the sentence "The girl stole my money." is constructed depending on the register:

- formal Abidjan French of the educated people: La fille m'a subtilisé mon argent.
- colloquial Abidjan French (français de Moussa): Fille-là a prend mon l'argent. (in standard French, the grammatically correct sentence should be Cette fille (là) m'a pris de l'argent)
- Abidjan French slang (Nouchi): La go a momo mon pia. (Momo is an Abidjan slang word meaning "to steal")

Another unique, identifiable feature of Ivorian French is the use of the phrase n'avoir qu'à + infinitif which, translated into English, roughly means, to have only to + infinitive. The phrase is often used in linguistic contexts of expressing a wish or creating hypotheticals. This original Ivorian phrase is generally used across the Ivory Coast's population; children, uneducated adults, and educated adults all using the phrase relatively equally. Often in written speech, the phrase is written as Ils non cas essayer de voir rather than Ils n'ont qu'à essayer de voir.

=== Characteristics ===
Many characteristics of Ivorian/Abidjan French differ from "standard" French found in France. Many of the linguistic evolutions are from the influences of native African languages spoken within the Ivory Coast and make Abidjan French a distinct dialect of French.

Some of the major phonetic and phonological variations of Abidjan French, as compared to a more "typical" French, include substituting the nasal low vowel [ɑ̃] for a non-nasal [a], especially when the sound occurs at the beginning of a word, and some difficulty with the full production of the phonemes /ʒ/ and /ʃ/. There are also, to a certain degree, rhythmic speaking patterns in Ivorian French that are influenced by native languages.

Ivorian French is also unique in its grammatical differences present in spoken speech such as these:

- omission of articles in some contexts (tu veux poisson instead of the French tu veux du poisson)
- omission of prepositions in some contexts (Il parti Yamoussoukro rather than Il est parti à Yamoussoukro)
- interchangeable usage of indirect and direct objects (using lui instead of le and vice versa)
- more flexible grammatical formation

== Angolan French ==
French is used as a language of communication, especially among the literate population in Cabinda, and it's also a language spoken in Angola as a significant French Angolan population, which includes Angolans with French ancestry and French people who live or have lived in Angola, many people, including a large percentage of the literate population, speak French fluently from the neighboring Democratic Republic of the Congo as a legacy of Belgian colonial rule from Brussels that declared its independence from Belgium on 30 June 1960. Angola has had a historical and cultural connection with France, particularly through its colonial past and subsequent economic and political relationships with other countries including Francophone Africa which had been colonized as former French colonies from Paris.

== Algerian French ==
Without being an official language, French is frequently used in government, workplaces, and education. French is the default language for work in several sectors. In a 2007 study set in the city of Mostaganem, it was shown that French and Arabic were the two functional languages of banking. Technical work (accounting, financial analysis, management) is also frequently done in French. Documents, forms, and posters are often in both French and Arabic.

The usage of French among the Algerian population is different depending on social situations. One can find:

- direct borrowings, where the lexical unit is unchanged: surtout (particularly), voiture (car)
- integrated borrowings, where the lexical unit experiences phonetic transformation: gendarme (police force), cinéma (cinema)
- code switching, where another language is spoken in addition to French in a single oration (ex: Berber/French, Arabic/French)

== Beninese French ==
French is the sole official language in Benin. In 2014, over 4 million Beninese citizens spoke French (around 40% of the population). Fongbe is the other widely spoken language of Benin. It is natural to hear both languages blending, either through loan words or code-switching.

Few academic sources exist surrounding the particularisms of Beninese French. Nevertheless, it is evident that Beninese French has adapted the meanings of several French terms over time, such as: seconder (to have relations with a second woman, from the French second - second), doigter (to show the way, from the French doigt – finger).

== Burkinabe French ==
French is the language of administration, education, and business in Burkina Faso and was the de jure official language until a constitutional change in 2024. While spoken fluently only by about a quarter of the population, French has progressively become a native language among urban populations since the late 20th century, notably in the cities of Ouagadougou, Bobo-Dioulasso, and Banfora. By 2010, about 10% of Ouagadougou residents spoke French as their first language.

Linguists have observed the development of a local vernacular of French in the country called français populaire burkinabè which is influenced by local languages such as Mooré and is used as a lingua franca in commerce. It is largely used as a spoken language whereas speakers continue to use standard French as the written language.

== Cameroonian French ==
Cameroonian French is a variety of French spoken in Cameroon. As a former French colony, the country's history has shaped its language, resulting in a distinct variety of French that reflects the country's diverse cultural, linguistic, and historical background.

== Kinshasa French ==
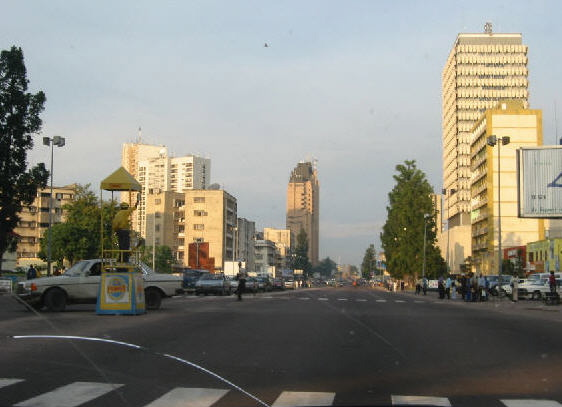
Boulevard du 30 Juin in the commercial heart of Kinshasa

With more than 11 million inhabitants, Kinshasa is the largest Francophone city in the world, surpassing Paris in population. It is the capital of the most populous francophone country in the world, the Democratic Republic of the Congo, where an estimated 43 million people (51% of the total population) can speak French (essentially as a second language). Contrary to Abidjan where French is the first language of a large part of the population, in Kinshasa French is only a second language, and its status of lingua franca is shared with Lingala. Kinshasa French also differs from other African French variants, for it has some Belgian French influences, due to colonization. People of different African mother tongues living in Kinshasa usually speak Lingala to communicate with each other in the street, but French is the language of businesses, administrations, schools, newspapers and televisions. French is also the predominant written language.

Due to its widespread presence in Kinshasa, French has become a local language with its own pronunciation and some local words borrowed for the most part from Lingala. Depending on their social status, some people may mix French and Lingala, or code switch between the two depending on the context. Here are examples of words particular to Kinshasa French. As in Abidjan, there exist various registers and the most educated people may frown upon the use of slangish/Lingala terms.

- cadavéré means broken, worn out, exhausted, or dead. It is a neologism on the standard French word cadavre whose meaning in standard French is "corpse". The word cadavéré has now spread to other African countries due to the popularity of Congolese music in Africa.
- makasi means strong, resistant. It is a loanword from Lingala.
- anti-nuit are sunglasses worn by partiers at night. It is a word coined locally and whose literal meaning in standard French is "anti-night". It is one of the many Kinshasa slang words related to nightlife and partying. A reveler is known locally as un ambianceur, from standard French ambiance which means atmosphere.
- casser le bic, literally "to break the Bic", means to stop going to school. Bic is colloquially used to refer to a ballpoint pen in Belgian French and Kinshasa French, but not in standard French.
- merci mingi means "thank you very much". It comes from standard French merci ("thank you") and Lingala mingi ("a lot").
- un zibolateur is a bottle opener. It comes from the Lingala verb kozibola which means "to open something that is blocked up or bottled", to which was added the standard French suffix -ateur.
- un tétanos is a rickety old taxi. In standard French tétanos means "tetanus".
- moyen tê vraiment means "absolutely impossible". It comes from moyen tê ("there's no way"), itself made up of standard French moyen ("way") and Lingala tê ("not", "no"), to which was added standard French vraiment ("really").
- avoir un bureau means to have a mistress. Il a deux bureaux doesn't mean "He has two offices", but "He has two mistresses".
- article 15 means "fend for yourself" or "find what you need by yourself".
- ça ne dérange pas means "thank you" or "you are welcome". When it means "thank you", it can offend some French speakers who are not aware of its special meaning in Kinshasa. For example, if one offers a present to a person, they will often reply ça ne dérange pas. In standard French, it means "I don't mind".
- quatre-vingt-et-un is the way Kinois say 81, quatre-vingt-un in Europe.
- compliquer quelqu'un, literally to make things "complicated" or difficult for someone. It can be anyone: Elle me complique, "She is giving me a tough time".
- une tracasserie is something someone does to make another person's life harder, and often refers to policemen or soldiers. A fine is often called a tracasserie, especially because the policemen in Kinshasa usually ask for an unpayable sum of money that requires extensive bargaining.

=== Characteristics ===
There are many linguistic differences that occur in Kinshasa French that make it a distinct dialect of French. Similarly to many other African dialects of French, many of the linguistic aspects are influenced, either directly or indirectly, by the linguistics of the local African languages. It is also essential to note that grammatical differences between local Congolese languages and the French language, such as the lack of gendered nouns in the former, result in linguistic changes when speakers of the former speak French.

Here are some of the phonetic characteristics of Kinshasa French:

- the posteriorization of anterior labial vowels in French, more specifically, the posteriorization of the common French phoneme [ɥ] for [u] (ex: pronunciation of the French word cuisine [kɥizin] as couwisine [kuwizin])
- the delabialization of the phoneme [y] for the phoneme [i] (ex: pronunciation of the French term bureau [byʁo] as biro [biʁo])
- the vocalic opening of the French phoneme [œ] creating, instead, the phoneme [ɛ] (ex: pronunciation of the French word acteur [aktœʁ] as actère [aktɛʁ])
- in some cases, the denasalization of French vowels (ex: pronunciation of the French term bande [bɑ̃d] as ba-nde [band])
- the mid-nasalization of occlusive consonants that follow the nasals [n] and [m] (ex: in relationship to the example above, the French word bande [bɑ̃d] could be pronounced both as ba-nde [band] or as ban-nde with a slightly nasalized [d])
- the palatalization of French apico-dental consonants that are followed by [i] and/or [ɥ] (ex: pronunciation of the French word dix [dis] is pronounced as dzix [dzis] and, similarly, the term parti may be pronounced as partsi)

As briefly mentioned above, many Congolese languages are ungendered languages and so there is often some mixing of the French masculine and feminine articles in speakers of Kinshasa French, such as the phrase Je veux du banane rather than the "correct" French Je veux de la banane.

== See also ==
- Anti-French sentiment#Africa
  - Alliance of Sahel States
- France–Africa relations
- French colonial empire
- Belgian colonial empire
- Geographical distribution of French speakers
- Camfranglais
- List of colonies and possessions of France
- Belgian Congo
- Maghreb French
- Françafrique
- Francophonie
- French-based creole languages
- French language in Minnesota
- French language in Vietnam
- French language in Cambodia
- French language in Laos
- French Polynesia
- Languages of Africa
