= Cameroonian French =

Variety of French spoken in Cameroon

- français camerounais
- Native to: Cameroon, Equatorial Guinea
- Region: Almost throughout Cameroon, except in Northwest and Southwest Regions which are English-speaking regions, Equatorial Guinea
- Ethnicity: Cameroonians, Equatoguineans
- Speakers: L1: 5.1 million L2: 1.3 million Total: 6.4 million (2005); According to the Organisation internationale de la Francophonie (OIF): 11 million (2022)
- Language family: Indo-European: Italic; Latino-Faliscan; Latin; Romance; Italo-Western; Western Romance; Gallo-Iberian; Gallo-Romance; Gallo-Rhaetian?; Arpitan–Oïl; Oïl; French; African French; West African French; Cameroonian French
- Early forms: Old Latin: Vulgar Latin; Proto-Romance; Old Gallo-Romance; Old French; Middle French; Metropolitan French
- Writing system: Latin (French alphabet)

Official status
- Official language in: Cameroon

Language codes
- ISO 639-3: –

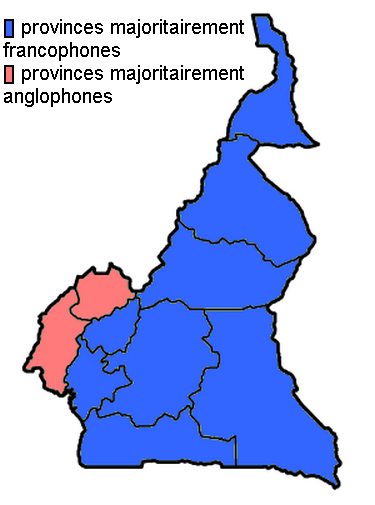
Major colonial languages by province in Cameroon

Cameroonian French is a variety of French spoken in Cameroon. As a former French colony, the country's history has shaped its language, resulting in a distinct variety of French that reflects the country's diverse cultural, linguistic, and historical background.

== Historical context ==
In the 19th century, Cameroon became the German colony Kamerun, before it was split into French and British Cameroon after World War I. This division significantly influenced the linguistic landscape, giving rise to the emergence of Cameroonian French and Cameroonian English, as well as a mixed vernacular known as Camfranglais.

== Number of speakers ==
Referring to literacy data in the official languages of the population aged 12 years and over according to the 2005 Cameroon census, 6,405,981 people spoke French as their main official language, with another 1,293,502 people able to speak both French and English. Meanwhile, according to the Organisation internationale de la Francophonie (OIF), Cameroon's French speakers numbered around 11 million in 2022.

== Characteristics ==
Cameroonian French is primarily based on Metropolitan French, the standard variety spoken in France. However, it has incorporated numerous elements from Cameroonian languages. The Cameroonian mindset of intercultural exchange has contributed to the adaptation and integration of local languages into everyday speech patterns.

One significant characteristic of Cameroonian French is the presence of loanwords from native languages such as Ewondo, Duala, and the Basaa language. These loanwords enhance and enrich the vocabulary, adding a distinct flavor to the language. For instance, terms like "mbom" (delicious) or "mbombo" (drum) have found their way into the Cameroonian French lexicon.

Furthermore, Cameroonian French exhibits syntactic and grammatical influences from indigenous languages as well. This combination results in different sentence structures, intonations, and unique pronunciations.

=== Sociolinguistic significance ===
Cameroonian French holds great importance in the country's social fabric and serves as a symbol of national identity. It is widely spoken across the nation, spanning various socio-economic and educational backgrounds. From informal conversations to formal academic and administrative settings, Cameroonian French serves as a medium of communication within the country.

Moreover, Cameroonian French has become an integral part of the country's popular culture, including music, literature, and cinema. Many Cameroonian artists and writers choose to express themselves in this language, giving their work a distinctively Cameroonian flavor.

Standard French is often privileged in formal education and professional settings, leading to the marginalization of Cameroonian French speakers. However, efforts are being made to promote and recognize the linguistic richness of Cameroonian French, aiming for greater acceptance and inclusion.

Additionally, the growth of technology and social media has opened up new avenues for the preservation and promotion of Cameroonian French. Online communities and digital platforms allow people to share their linguistic experiences, document the language's evolution, and foster a sense of pride in Cameroonian French.

== See also ==
- Languages of Cameroon
- African French
- Cameroonian English

== Bibliography ==
- N. M., Kamwangamalu (2016). In The Handbook of World Englishes. Cameroon: John Wiley & Sons, Ltd. pp. 331–347.
- Nugent P. and, Asong L. (2007). In Africa since 1800. Cameroon: Palgrave Macmillan, London. pp. 220–244.
- A., Tcheuyap (2014). Code-Switching and Mixing in Cameroon: Linguistic, Social and Attitudinal Bases. Linguistische Berichte. pp. 123–142, 239.
- Ayafor, I. R.; Stevens, B. (2007). Trilingualism in Cameroon: Attitudes of Cameroonian University Students toward English, French, and Cameroonian Pidgin English. pp. 4(2), 197–214.
