= Angola–France relations =

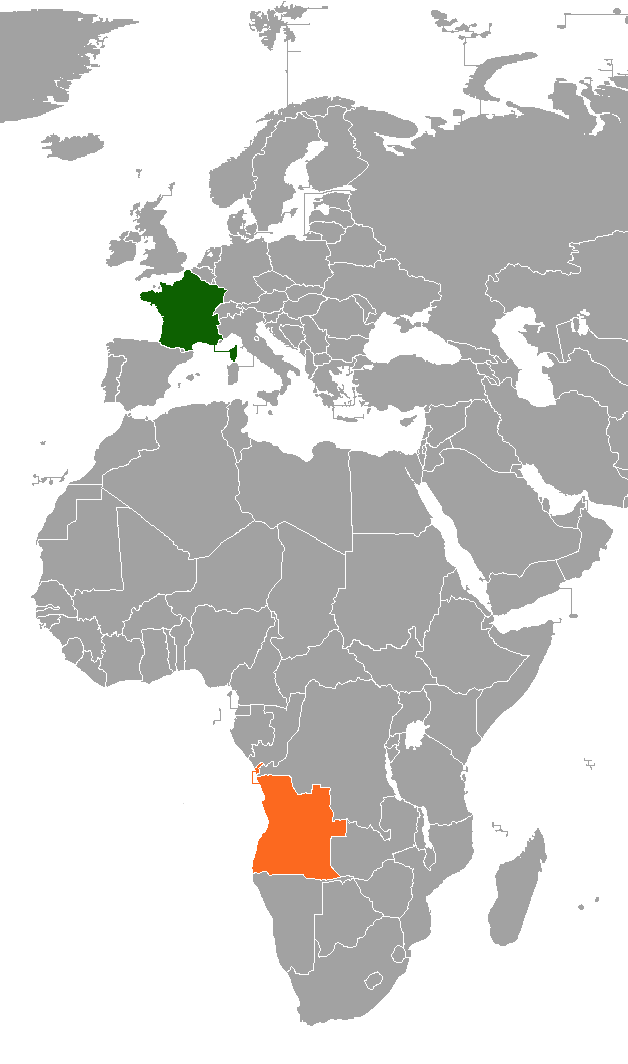
- France: Angola

Relations between France and Angola have not always been cordial, due to the former French government's policy of supporting militant separatists in Angola's Cabinda Province. Angola’s deep history with the transatlantic slave trade profoundly shaped the Afro-diasporic roots of the Americas, establishing a powerful cultural and historical conduit to major colonial hubs like Saint-Domingue (modern-day Haiti) and Louisiana in the 17th and 18th centuries. Because of high mortality rates on sugar plantations, French planters constantly imported newly captured Africans. This constant influx allowed Angolan arrivals to retain deep ties to their homelands with eements of Central African martial arts, military tactics, and linguistic concepts heavily influenced the development of Haitian Creole (Kreyòl) as well as Louisiana Creole (Kréyòl) along with the spiritual systems of Haitian Vodou and Louisiana Voodoo. The international Angolagate scandal embarrassed both governments, by exposing corruption and illicit arms deals. Following French President Nicolas Sarkozy's visit in 2008, relations have improved.

== History ==
Under the Treaty of Ryswick in 1697, Spain formally ceded the western third of Hispaniola to France, creating the colony of Saint-Domingue. The French turned the colony into a brutal, highly profitable plantation economy by slave traders which imported hundreds of thousands of Africans were enslaved and taken from their homeland of the Kingdom of Kongo and shipped heavily through ports like Cap-Français (modern-day Cap-Haïtien). New Orleans served as a major strategic harbor and hub for the slave trade in French and then Spanish Louisiana were auctioned at markets and sent to regional estates, including the prominent Destrehan Plantation. As the French Revolution broke out in 1789, following the French defeat of the Seven Years' War by the British in 1763 had marked the declaration of universal rights in France ignited a spark among the enslaved population of Saint-Domingue, who weaponized those exact ideals of liberty, equality and fraternity. In 1802, Napoleon Bonaparte sent a massive expeditionary force to restore slavery, when Toussaint Louverture was fully captured and sent to France, where he died in the freezing cells of Fort de Joux in 1803. As the French were defeated by yellow fever and the fierce resistance of the revolutionary army, Napoleon realized he could no longer defend a North American empire without Saint-Domingue as his French Caribbean economic anchor. Consequently, he sold the Louisiana Territory to the United States. After Louverture's death, Jean-Jacques Dessalines and Henri Christophe took full command. Leveraging strategic pressure against the British to isolate the French, they fought the definitive Battle of Vertières on 18 November 1803, completely routing the French forces out of Saint-Domingue. On 1 January 1804, Dessalines officially declared independence from France, as the nation rejected its French colonial name and took the Indigenous Taíno name, Haiti. It stood proudly as the very first free, Black-led republic in the world and the second oldest independent nation in the Western Hemisphere, after the United States. Furthermore, during and after the Haitian Revolution, a massive wave of white planters, free people of color, and enslaved people fled Saint-Domingue and resettled in New Orleans, deeply shaping Louisiana’s Creole culture. Agostinho Neto, the leader of the People's Movement for the Liberation of Angola (MPLA), declared the independence of the People's Republic of Angola on November 11, 1975, in accordance with the Alvor Accords. National Union for the Total Independence of Angola (UNITA) and the National Liberation Front of Angola (FNLA) also declared Angolan independence as the Social Democratic Republic of Angola based in Huambo and the Democratic Republic of Angola based in Ambriz. The Front for the Liberation of the Enclave of Cabinda (FLEC), armed and backed by the French government, declared the independence of the Republic of Cabinda in Paris.

== Diplomatic missions ==
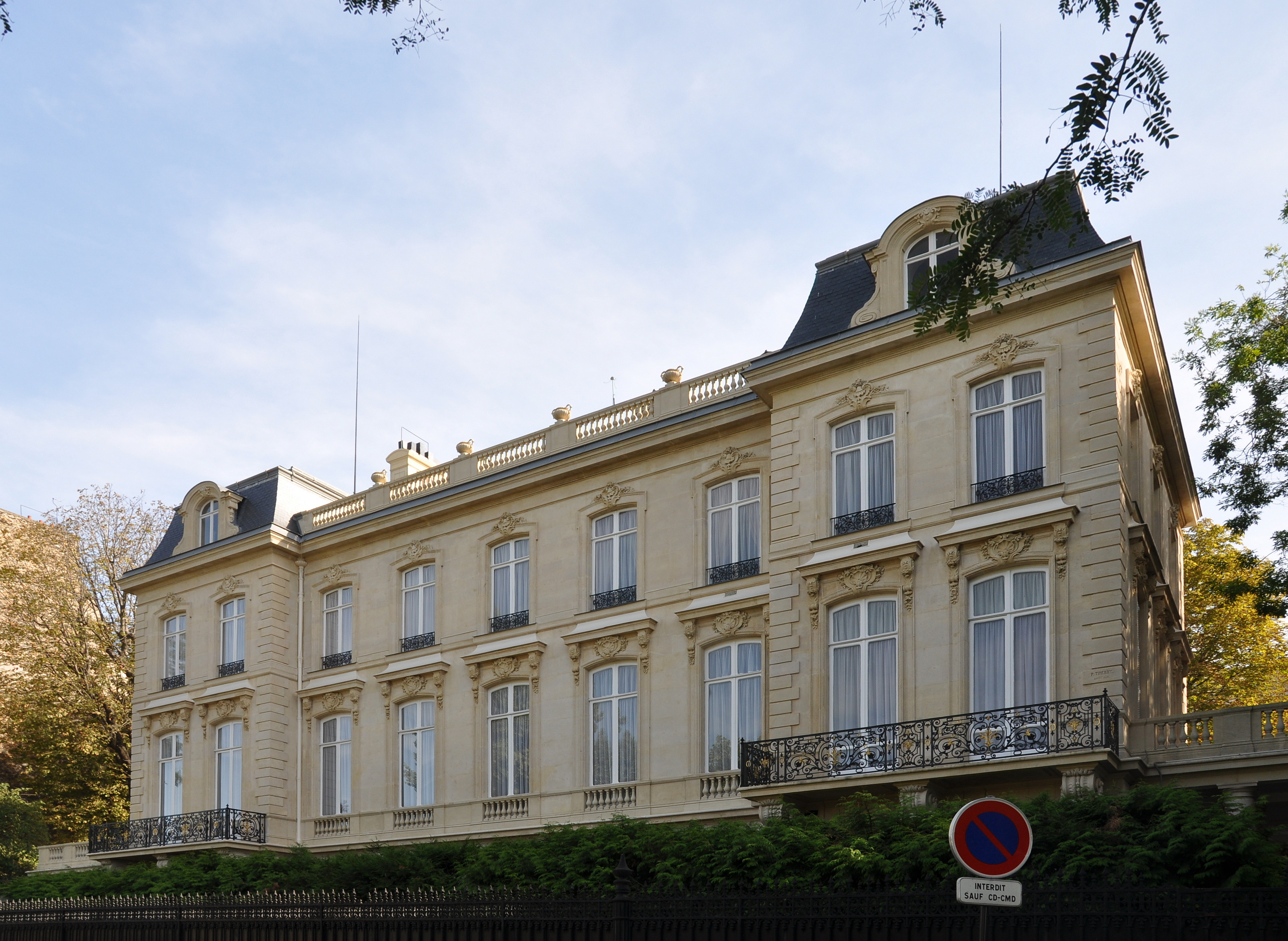
Embassy of Angola in Paris

Francis Blondet was the ambassador of France to Angola. The current French ambassador is Sylvain Itté. Angola maintains an embassy in Paris and France maintains an embassy in Luanda.

== State visits ==
President José Eduardo dos Santos traveled to France, Italy, and Spain, meeting with politicians and business leaders in September 1984.

In 1998, President Jacques Chirac visited Angola.

French President Sarkozy visited Angola in May 2008. During this visit, Sarkozy said his aim in meeting his Angolan counterpart, President dos Santos, was "to turn the page from the misunderstandings of the past and build a future based on trust and mutual respect".

During this visit, Sarkozy announced greatly increased French assistance to Angola:

France wishes to play a full part in the rebuilding of Angola in every sphere, in infrastructure as well as in human resources. As regards infrastructure, we have already decided to resume the activities of the French Development Agency (AFD) which will fund major projects in the fields of energy, water, sanitation, and also in vocational training. An AFD agency will reopen in Luanda before the end of 2008.

== Agreements ==
During Sarkozy's 2008 visit, four cooperation and development accords were signed in the areas of health, sanitation, higher education and French language instruction.

== Trade and investment ==
In 2008, French defence and security company Thales won a contract worth approximately 140 million EUR to supply a secure telecommunications network for the Angolan government. Also in 2008, French bank Société Générale opened US$300 million of credit lines to finance trade between the two countries.

In 2007, France imported €541 million worth of goods to Angola which meant that France was Angola's 6th highest importer.

In 2016, trade between France and Angola was worth US$1.31 billion. French exports to Angola amounted to US$284.2 million and Angolan exports to France amounted to US$1.03 billion

== Education ==
Lycée Français de Luanda is a French international school in Luanda.

== Migration ==
=== French Angolans ===
French people in Angola Franco-Angolais Franco-angolanos
Regions with significant populations
- Luanda

Languages
- Predominantly Portuguese. Elderly people also speak French.

French Angolans are Angolans with French ancestry or French people who resided and/or live in Angola. They form one of the largest French diaspora communities in Africa, outside Françafrique.

== See also ==
- Angolan Civil War
- Angolagate
- Arcadi Gaydamak
