= Cameroonian English =

Dialect of English

- Native to: Cameroon (largely Northwest and Southwest regions)
- Region: Central Africa
- Language family: Indo-European: Germanic; West Germanic; Ingvaeonic; Anglo-Frisian; Anglic; English; Cameroonian English
- Early forms: Old English: Middle English; Early Modern English
- Writing system: Latin (English alphabet); Unified English Braille

Official status
- Official language in: Cameroon

Language codes
- ISO 639-1: en
- ISO 639-2: eng
- ISO 639-3: eng
- Glottolog: came1256
- IETF: en-CM
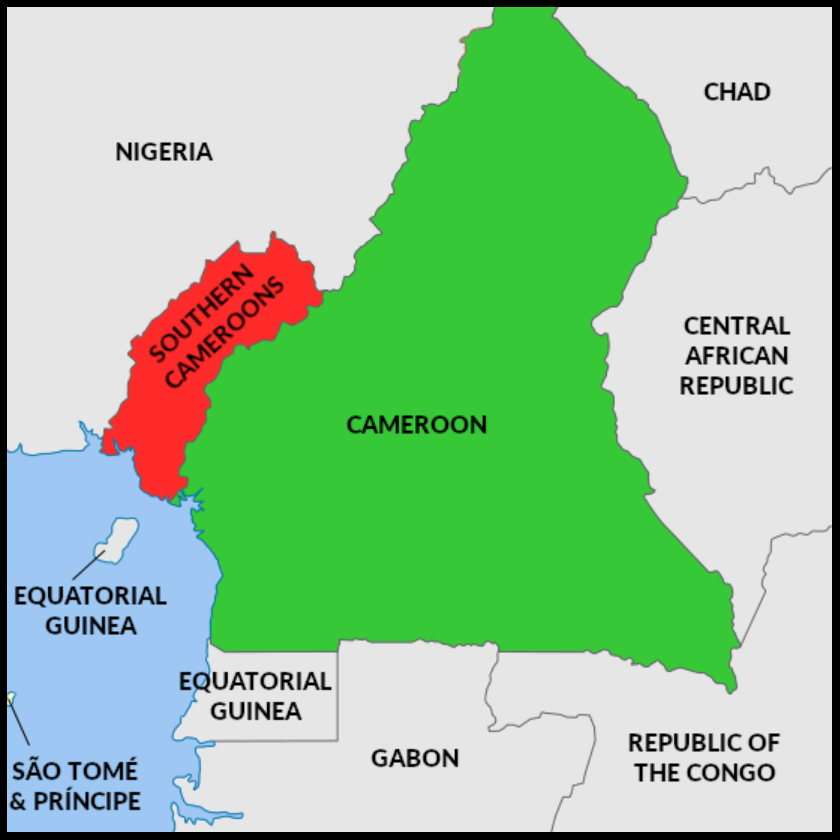
- Southern Cameroons in Cameroon

Cameroonian English (CamE), also known as Cameroon English, or sometimes Cameroon Anglophone English or Ambazonian English, is an English dialect spoken predominantly in Cameroon. It shares some similarities with English varieties in neighbouring West Africa, as Cameroon lies at the west of Central Africa; however, its distinctive phonetics, phonology and lexicon, influenced both by French and by indigenous Cameroonian languages, distinguish it as an independent variety. It is primarily spoken in the Northwest and Southwest regions of Cameroon.

It is a postcolonial variety of English, long in use in the territory (Southern Cameroons, now split into Northwest and Southwest). Over the years, it has developed characteristic features, particularly in lexis but also in phonology and grammar. Those characteristics were once regarded as errors but are now increasingly accepted as distinctive Cameroonian contributions to the English language.

== Varieties ==
There are differences between the formal, "institutional" variety of Cameroonian English, which is based on British English and is taught in schools in Cameroon, and the indigenised "communal" variety, which is the more innovative form spoken in Anglophone communities. Varietal differences also exist between speaker communities of various indigenous languages such as Nso and Akoose.

== Phonology ==
Cameroonian English is a non-rhotic dialect, meaning that it drops syllable-final /r/. It exhibits the following 7-vowel phonology:

Vowel phonemes
	Front	Central	Back
Close	i		u
Close-mid	e		o
Open-mid	ɛ		ɔ
Open		a	

The phonemes /ɔː/, /ʌ/ and /ɒ/ tend to merge to /ɔ/, making "caught", "cut" and "cot" homophones. Similarly, "lock" and "luck" are pronounced alike, and "white-collar worker" sometimes becomes "white-colour worker" in Cameroon. The phonemes /æ/ and /ɑː/ are merged into /a/. Other mergers, such as the foot-goose merger and the fleece-kit merger are also present.

Despite being non-rhotic, linking and intrusive R are not present in Cameroonian English. Neither are the dental fricatives /θ/ or /ð/, generally seeing TH-stopping, that is, pronouncing them as alveolar stops /t/ or /d/. Final obstruents are devoiced, pronouncing words such as lab, bad, George, Steve as [lap, bat, dʒɔtʃ, stif]. Before /j/, /h/ is deleted, rendering human as [juman].

== Vocabulary ==
The Cameroon English lexicon is characterised by significant lexical innovation, including various types of word formation such as borrowing, derivation and semantic change.

Characteristic turns of phrase in the country or local coinages:

- "detailly" = in detail
- "to see with me" = to agree with me; to see my point of view
- "installmentally" = by installments
- "of recent" = recently; lately

== See also ==
- Languages of Cameroon
  - Cameroonian French
  - Cameroonian Pidgin English
  - Camfranglais (when mixed with French)
- Anglophone Cameroonian
- Anglophone problem (Cameroon)
- Commonwealth English
