= Francis Blondet =

French diplomat

- Born: 2 February 1945 (age 81)
- Occupation: Diplomat
- Known for: Former ambassador of France to Burkina Faso from 2003 to 2006

Francis Blondet (born 2 February 1945) is a French diplomat. He served as ambassador of France to Burkina Faso from 2003 to 2006 and later served as ambassador to Angola.
