= Camfranglais =

Mixed language of Cameroon

- Native to: Cameroon
- Region: urban regions
- Speakers: mostly younger people
- Language family: Mixed of Cameroonian French, Cameroonian English, and Cameroonian Pidgin English, with lexical from other languages of Cameroon

Language codes
- ISO 639-3: –
- Glottolog: camf1234

Camfranglais (French pronunciation: [kamfʁɑ̃ɡlɛ]), Francanglais, or Francamglais (portmanteau of the French adjectives camerounais, français, and anglais) is a vernacular of Cameroon, containing grammatical and lexical elements from Cameroonian French, Cameroonian English, and Cameroonian Pidgin English, in addition to lexical contributions from various indigenous languages of Cameroon.

The language blend is common among young people in the country and rivals Cameroonian Pidgin English ("Creole") as the country's most common lingua franca. It is most popular in the high-density urban centres where anglophones and francophones meet. Camfranglais has caused concern for educators, who worry that the language blend may hinder acquisition of regular French and English and may be seen as a shortcut around true bilingualism. Studies are underway over Camfranglais, which some academics consider to be on its way to becoming a proper language.

== History ==
Camfranglais first emerged in the mid-1970s after the reunification of the former French Cameroon and former Southern Cameroons, part of British Cameroon. It is believed to have originated in the markets, ports, schools, and sports stadiums of Cameroon's larger cities. It became fashionable in the late 1990s, due partially to its use by popular musicians. Camfranglais continues to be used in music today, in the work of musicians like Koppo, Krotal, and AkSangGrave, as well as by writers such as Kalalobe and Labang.

Today, Camfranglais sees widespread unofficial use in the Cameroonian education system. Though Cameroon claims both French and English as official languages, elementary schools teach in only a single language. Thus, elementary pupils are surrounded by others that primarily speak the same language. It is not until secondary school that learning the other becomes mandatory. This helps explain why Camfranglais sees use in secondary school environments, as it is the first time that many students from different linguistic backgrounds begin to attend the same schools. Furthermore, Camfranglais is a hidden language, mainly used by speakers as a way to hide their conversations, or appear mysterious to others. As such, it has grown rapidly within the Cameroonian secondary school system, where students use it to communicate without being understood by outsiders.

=== Classification ===
While it is clear that Camfranglais is a contact language, the status of Camfranglais remains up for debate, as some authors call it a "hybrid language", while others call it a "composite language." Whether or not it is its own language is debated as well, as scholars also argue that it is simply "a new speech form." Difficulties in classifying Camfranglais arise because of its relatively contemporary usage, despite contact having occurred between the different languages that comprise Camfranglais for longer than Camfranglais has existed distinctly.

As a whole, Camfranglais sets itself apart from other pidgins and creoles in that it consists of an array of languages, where familiarity with the source languages is required but proficiency in them is not (except in the case of French, since it provides the sentence patterns). It contains elements of compounding words, word clipping, and coinage of new terms among others. Numerous other classifications have been proposed, like 'pidgin', 'argot', 'youth language', a 'sabir camerounais', an 'appropriation vernaculaire du français' or a 'hybrid slang'. However, as Camfranglais is more developed than a slang, this too is insufficient. Kiessling (2005) proposes it be classified as a 'highly hybrid sociolect of the urban youth type', a definition that Stein-Kanjora (2015) agrees with.

== Usage and popularity ==
Camfranglais has been accepted and embraced by Cameroon's urban youth population, particularly on the internet. In fact, this acceptance has created what some consider to be a 'Camfranglais Cult' among the youth. While the reasons for this are many, Stein-Kanjora posits that by choosing it over French, English, or indigenous languages, the youth are able to form a modern, urban identity, separate from the colonial and tribal connotations of older languages.

Camfranglais is predominantly used by youth between the ages of 12 and 26. Additionally, although the number of female speakers is growing, the language is mainly used and developed by males, at least partially due to active exclusion of women by male speakers.

== Examples ==
Camfranglais Translation
Franglais	French	English
Tu go où?	Tu vas où?	Where are you going?
Je vais te see tomorrow.	Je vais te voir demain.	I will see you tomorrow.
J'ai buy l'affci au bateau.	J'ai acheté ceci au marché.	I bought this stuff at the market.
Il est sorti nayo nayo.	Il est sorti très lentement.	He went out very slowly.
On va all back au mboa	Nous allons tous rentrer au pays	We will all go home
Le mbom ci est trop chiche	Ce gars est ingrat	This boy is ungrateful
Les ways fort	Les histoires intéressantes	Interesting tales
Je wanda (=wonder)	Ça m'étonne	I'm surprised
Il fimba à mon cousin	Il ressemble à mon cousin	He looks like my cousin

== See also ==
- African French
- Franglais

== Sources ==
1. DeLancey, Mark Dike; Mbuh, Rebecca Neh; DeLancey, Mark W. (2010). Historical Dictionary of the Republic of Cameroon. Scarecrow Press. ISBN 978-0-8108-7399-5.
2. Kiessling, R. (2005). "'bak mwa me do' - Camfranglais in Cameroon". Lingua Posnaniensis (47): 87–107.
3. Kießling, Roland. "Cameroon: Camfranglais." In Urban Contact Dialects and Language Change, pp. 11-27. Routledge, 2022.
4. Kouega, Jean-Paul (November 2003). "Word Formative Processes in Camfranglais". World Englishes. 22 (4): 511–538. doi:10.1111/j.1467-971X.2003.00316.x.
5. Niba, Francis Ngwa (20 February 2007). "New language for divided Cameroon". BBC News.
6. Ojongnkpot, Comfort Beyang Oben. "Urban youth language use in social media in Anglophone Cameroon: A morpho-syntactic analysis of Camfranglais among University of Buea students." In Sociolinguistics in African contexts, pp. 287-300. Springer, Cham, 2017.
7. Raschi, Nataša (2019). "Le camfranglais comme exemple de parler jeune" [Camfranglais as an example of youth speech]. Studies in African Languages and Cultures (in French) (53): 57–68. doi:10.32690/SALC53.3. S2CID 212796587. Full text available from SALC journal archive.
8. Stein-Kanjora, Gardy (2015). "Camfrang forever! Metacommunication in and about Camfranglais". Sociolinguistic Studies. 10 (1–2): 261–289. doi:10.1558/sols.v10i1-2.27951. ProQuest 1805464424.
9. Ubanako, Valentine Njende (2021). "Is 'Camfranglais' A New Language? A Review of Current Opinions". International Linguistics Research. 4 (1): 36. doi:10.30560/ilr.v4n1p36. S2CID 233253468.
