= Foreign relations of Israel =

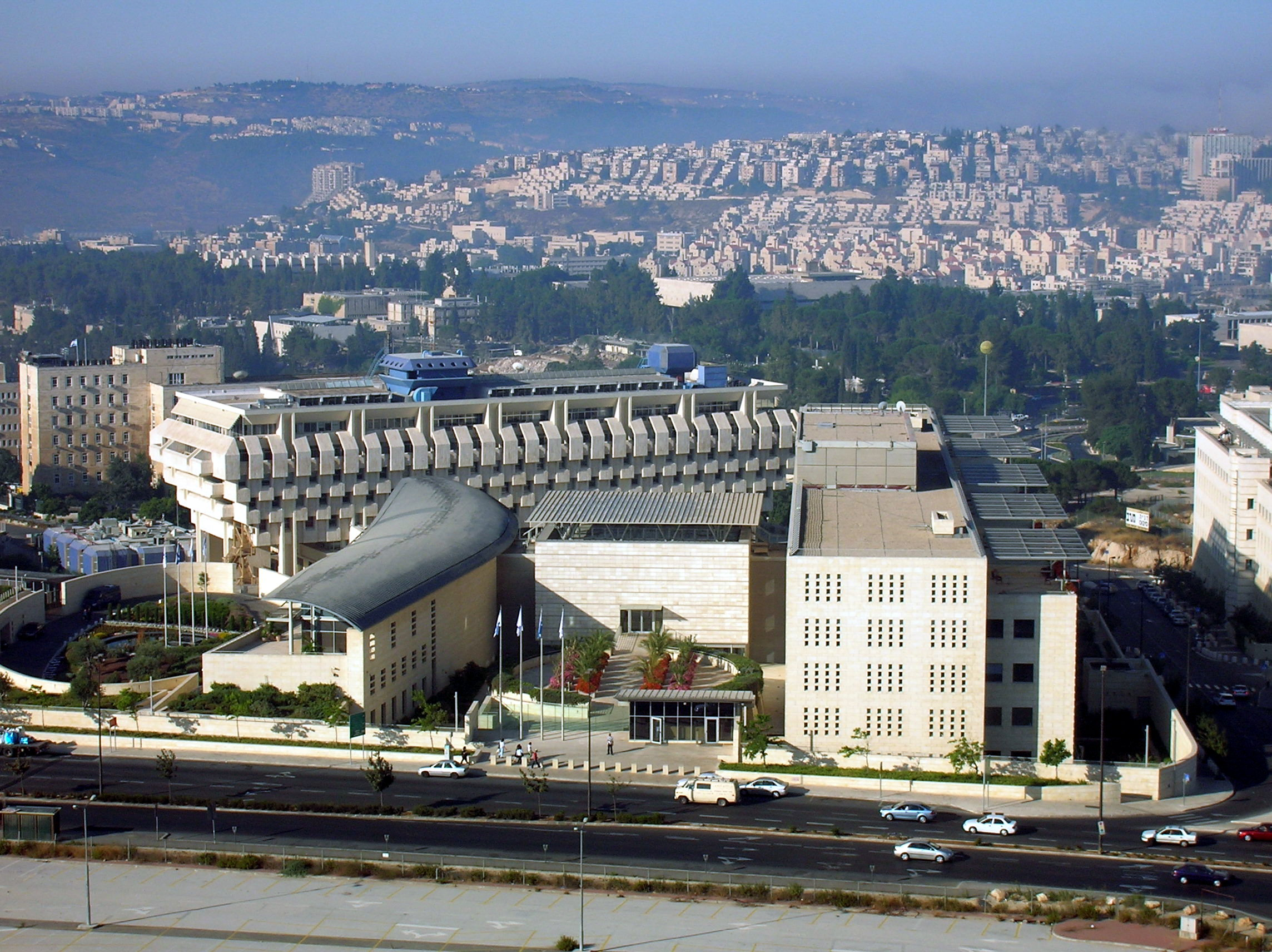
The Israeli Foreign Ministry in Jerusalem

Foreign relations of Israel refers to diplomatic and trade relations between Israel and other countries around the world. Israel has diplomatic ties with 165 of the other 192 UN member states as of 12 December 2020. Israel is a member of the United Nations (UN) and a number of other international organisations. Israel maintains full diplomatic relations with two of its Arab neighbours, Egypt and Jordan, after signing peace treaties in 1979 and 1994 respectively. In 2020, Israel signed agreements establishing diplomatic relations with three Arab League countries, Bahrain, the United Arab Emirates, and Morocco. As of 2021, Israel had formal diplomatic relations with 168 countries, while 28 UN member states have either never established, or have broken off diplomatic relations with Israel.

Israel's foreign relations are influenced primarily by Israel's strategic situation in the Middle East, the broader Arab–Israeli conflict and the conflict with Iran particularly over Iran's nuclear program, along with the rejection by regional states. Israel's foreign policy goals have therefore been to overcome diplomatic isolation and to achieve recognition and friendly relations with as many nations as possible, both in the Middle East region and further afield. Israel practices both open and secret diplomacy to further national goals, for example, commercial trade and science and technology cooperation, importing raw materials, engaging in military procurement as well as exporting arms and military assistance, intelligence cooperation with its allies, and prisoner-of-war exchanges and other arrangements for hostage releases. It has also sought to foster increased Jewish immigration to Israel and to protect vulnerable Jewish communities in the Diaspora, to offer aid to developing countries and humanitarian assistance to countries facing large-scale disasters.

Israel's close friendship with the United States has been a linchpin of its foreign policy since the establishment of the state. Until the Iranian Revolution and the fall of the Pahlavi dynasty in 1979, Israel and Iran maintained close ties. Iran was the second Muslim-majority country to recognize Israel as a sovereign nation after Turkey. In the mid-20th century, Israel ran extensive foreign aid and educational programs in Africa, sending experts in agriculture, water management and health care. China is also one of the few countries in the world to concurrently maintain warm relations with both Israel and the Muslim world at large.

During the 2000s, the Israeli Ministry of Foreign Affairs warned that the increasing influence of the European Union would further isolate Israel in global affairs. In the wake of a series of diplomatic rifts with Turkey and the rise of the Muslim Brotherhood in Egypt in 2011, Israel had increasingly unfriendly relations with those countries for a few years. During roughly the same period, Israeli relations with many countries in Europe including Greece and Cyprus in the context of the Energy Triangle and in Asia, including China and India, were enhanced, largely on account of the growth of Israel's high-tech economy. Israeli ties with Egypt have improved since the Muslim Brotherhood was removed from power there, while ties to Turkey have been uneven since their 2010 nadir.

== Membership in international organizations ==
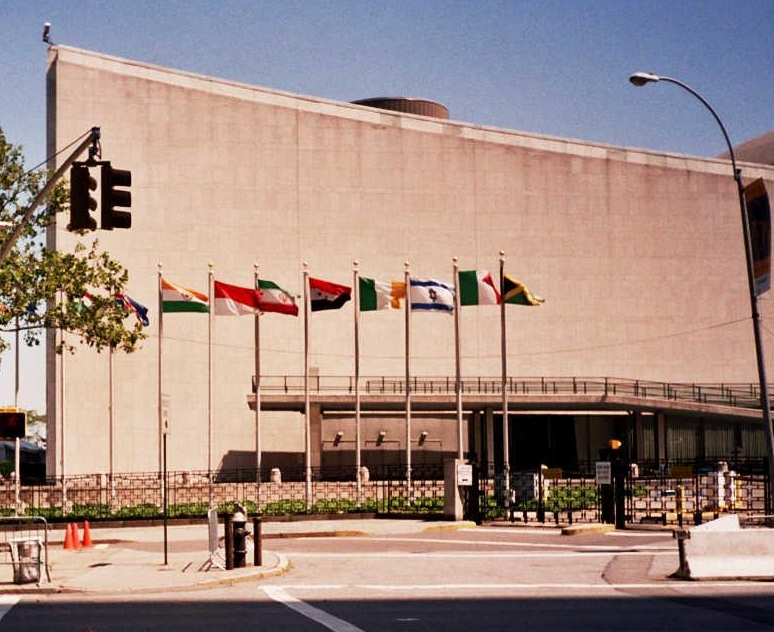
Israeli flag at the United Nations building in New York

The first international organization which the Israeli government joined was the International Wheat Council, established as part of Point Four Program in early 1949. Israel has been a member of the United Nations since 11 May 1949.

Israel is a member of many UN agencies, including the Office of the United Nations High Commissioner for Refugees (UNHCR) and the Food and Agriculture Organization (FAO). Israel also participates in other international organizations such as the International Atomic Energy Agency (IAEA) and the World Health Organization (WHO). Israel left the United Nations Educational, Scientific and Cultural Organization (UNESCO) in a coordinated move with the US in 2019.

Within the UNESCO, Israel was a member in many international programs and organizations. In the area of science, Israel was an active member of the Man and the Biosphere Programme (MAB), the Intergovernmental Oceanographic Commission (IOC), the International Hydrological Programme (IHP), the International Centre for Synchrotron-Light for Experimental Science Applications in the Middle East (SESAME), and the International Geoscience Programme (IGCP).

Other notable organizations Israel is an active member of include the Education For All movement, the European Centre for Higher Education (CEPES), the World Heritage Committee (WHC), the International Centre for the Study of the Preservation and Restoration of Cultural Property (ICCROM), and the International Council on Monuments and Sites (ICOMOS). Relations were carried out through the Israeli National Commission for UNESCO.

Israel joined the European Union's Framework Programmes for Research and Technological Development (FP) in 1994, and is a member of the European Organization for Nuclear Research (CERN), the European Molecular Biology Organization (EMBO) and the European Molecular Biology Laboratory (EMBL). It is also a member of the Bank for International Settlement (BIS) since 2003.

On 10 May 2010, Israel was invited to join the Organisation for Economic Co-operation and Development (OECD). Israel is a member of NATO's Mediterranean Dialogue forum. In 2014 Israel joined the Paris Club.

After over 50 years of not being part of a regional grouping in the UN (effectively shut out of many internationals organizations), Israel joined the Western European and Others group on a temporary basis in 2000. Israel joined on a permanent basis in 2014.

== Diplomatic relations ==
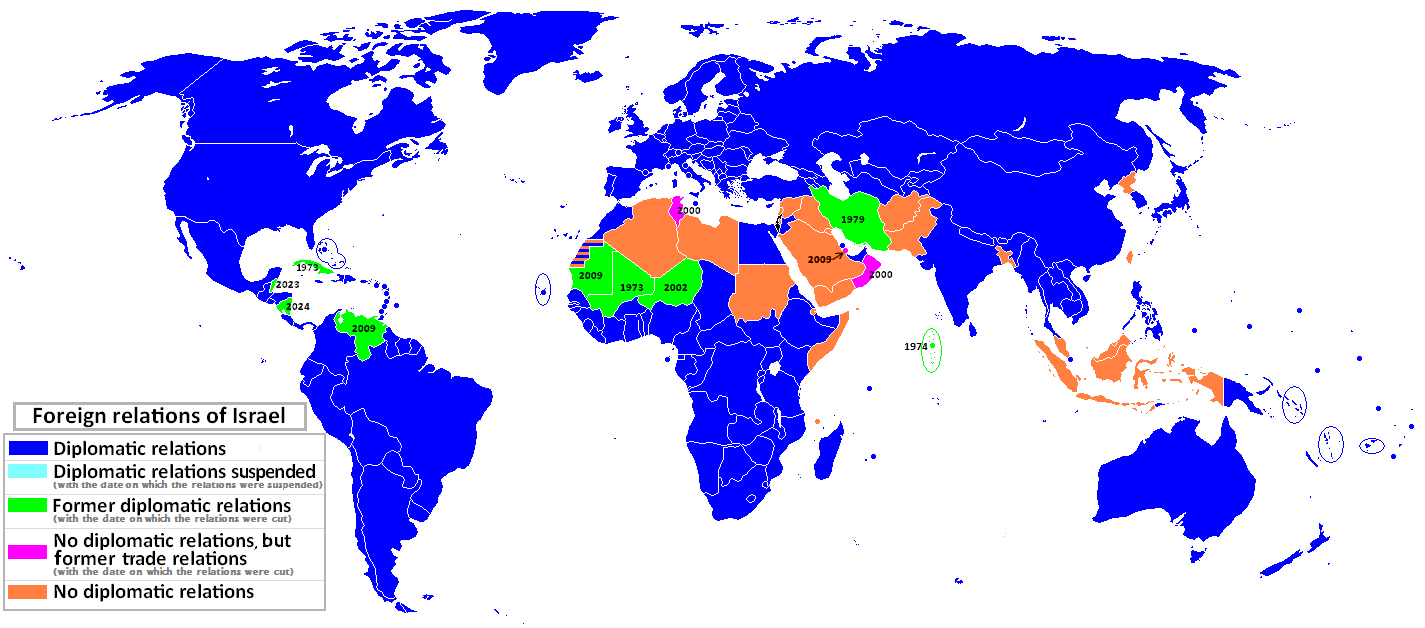
World map showing status of Israel's diplomatic relations in 2025

After the establishment of the State of Israel in 1948, Israel was subjected to Arab League boycotts and attempts to diplomatically isolate the state. As of 2025, Israel has diplomatic ties with 165 out of the other 192 member states of the United Nations, as well as with the Holy See, Kosovo, the Cook Islands, Niue and Somaliland. Some other countries recognize Israel as a state, but have no diplomatic relations. Several countries once had diplomatic relations with Israel, but have since broken or suspended them (Cuba and Venezuela in Latin America, Mauritania in the Arab League, Mali and Niger in non-Arab Africa, the Maldives in South Asia, and Iran until the Islamic revolution). In addition, a number of countries (all members of the Arab League) that at one time had formal economic ties (primarily trade offices) with Israel, which fell short of full diplomatic relations, subsequently severed such ties (Morocco, Oman, Qatar and Tunisia; however, Morocco renewed ties and established diplomatic relations in 2020).

=== List ===
List of countries which Israel maintains diplomatic relations with:

#	Country	Date
1	Guatemala	15 May 1948
—	Nicaragua (suspended)	18 May 1948
2	Poland	19 May 1948
3	Uruguay	19 May 1948
4	Russia	26 May 1948
5	El Salvador	May 1948
6	Romania	11 June 1948
7	Panama	18 June 1948
8	Czech Republic	3 July 1948
9	Serbia	25 November 1948
10	Bulgaria	29 November 1948
11	Australia	29 January 1949
12	Hungary	6 February 1949
13	United States	28 March 1949
14	France	11 May 1949
15	Argentina	31 May 1949
16	Italy	2 July 1949
17	Netherlands	3 September 1949
18	Belgium	22 September 1949
19	Turkey	10 January 1950
20	Honduras	January 1950
21	United Kingdom	28 April 1950
22	Chile	16 May 1950
23	Norway	19 July 1950
24	Sweden	4 November 1950
25	Finland	14 November 1950
26	Luxembourg	21 November 1950
27	Paraguay	5 December 1950
28	Denmark	7 December 1950
29	New Zealand	17 January 1951
30	Switzerland	25 June 1951
31	Iceland	10 August 1951
32	Brazil	8 April 1952
33	Japan	15 May 1952
34	Mexico	1 July 1952
—	Venezuela (suspended)	21 November 1952
35	Myanmar	13 July 1953
—	Cuba (suspended)	16 June 1954
36	Thailand	28 June 1954
37	Canada	28 July 1954
38	Costa Rica	22 October 1954
39	Dominican Republic	7 June 1955
40	Austria	2 March 1956
41	Peru	6 November 1956
42	Ecuador	18 June 1957
43	Colombia	1 July 1957
44	Bolivia	3 July 1957
45	Philippines	9 August 1957
46	Liberia	22 August 1957
47	Ghana	October 1957
48	Sri Lanka	1 January 1958
49	Haiti	12 September 1958
50	Cambodia	16 February 1959
51	Guinea	24 August 1959
52	Nepal	1 June 1960
—	Mali (suspended)	28 June 1960
53	Democratic Republic of the Congo	30 June 1960
54	Madagascar	1 July 1960
55	Cyprus	17 August 1960
56	Togo	8 September 1960
57	Nigeria	1 October 1960
58	Republic of the Congo	9 November 1960
59	Senegal	10 November 1960
60	Gabon	15 November 1960
61	Chad	10 January 1961
62	Ivory Coast	24 May 1961
63	Sierra Leone	1 June 1961
64	Burkina Faso	5 July 1961
65	Ethiopia	24 October 1961
—	Niger (suspended)	9 November 1961
66	Central African Republic	10 November 1961
67	Benin	5 December 1961
68	Tanzania	20 December 1961
69	South Korea	10 April 1962
70	Rwanda	1 July 1962
71	Jamaica	29 August 1962
72	Trinidad and Tobago	31 August 1962
73	Uganda	9 October 1962
74	Burundi	22 December 1962
75	Kenya	10 December 1963
76	Malawi	15 July 1964
77	Cameroon	4 September 1964
78	Zambia	17 March 1965
79	Germany	10 May 1965
80	Gambia	3 June 1965
—	Maldives (suspended)	29 October 1965
81	Malta	1 December 1965
82	Lesotho	4 October 1966
83	Botswana	24 May 1967
84	Barbados	29 August 1967
85	Mauritius	23 April 1968
86	Eswatini	September 1968
87	Equatorial Guinea	1968
88	Singapore	11 May 1969
89	Fiji	10 October 1970
90	Samoa	30 May 1972
91	Bahamas	24 September 1974
92	Ireland	12 December 1974
93	Grenada	January 1975
94	South Africa	29 December 1975
95	Suriname	24 February 1976
96	Portugal	12 May 1977
97	Tonga	June 1977
98	Dominica	January 1978
99	Papua New Guinea	1 May 1978
100	Saint Lucia	January 1979
101	Egypt	26 February 1980
102	Saint Vincent and the Grenadines	January 1981
103	Antigua and Barbuda	22 June 1983
104	Saint Kitts and Nevis	January 1984
105	Kiribati	21 May 1984
106	Tuvalu	July 1984
—	Belize (suspended)	11 March 1985
107	Spain	17 January 1986
108	Marshall Islands	16 September 1987
109	Federated States of Micronesia	23 November 1988
110	Solomon Islands	1 January 1989
111	Greece	21 May 1990
112	Albania	19 August 1991
113	Mongolia	2 October 1991
114	Ukraine	26 December 1991
115	Latvia	6 January 1992
116	Lithuania	8 January 1992
117	Estonia	9 January 1992
118	India	21 January 1992
119	China	25 January 1992
120	Uzbekistan	21 February 1992
121	Kyrgyzstan	4 March 1992
122	Guyana	9 March 1992
123	Liechtenstein	13 March 1992
124	Belarus	26 March 1992
125	Tajikistan	26 March 1992
126	Armenia	4 April 1992
127	Azerbaijan	7 April 1992
128	Kazakhstan	10 April 1992
129	Angola	16 April 1992
130	Slovenia	28 April 1992
131	Georgia	1 June 1992
132	Moldova	16 June 1992
133	Seychelles	30 June 1992
134	Slovakia	1 January 1993
135	Eritrea	24 May 1993
136	Vietnam	12 July 1993
137	Mozambique	26 July 1993
138	Vanuatu	16 September 1993
139	Turkmenistan	8 October 1993
140	São Tomé and Príncipe	16 November 1993
141	Zimbabwe	26 November 1993
142	Laos	6 December 1993
143	Namibia	21 January 1994
144	Guinea-Bissau	10 March 1994
145	Andorra	13 April 1994
—	Holy See	15 June 1994
146	Cape Verde	27 July 1994
147	Palau	2 October 1994
148	Jordan	26 October 1994
149	Nauru	December 1994
150	San Marino	30 October 1995
151	North Macedonia	7 December 1995
152	Croatia	4 September 1997
153	Bosnia and Herzegovina	4 September 1997
—	Mauritania (suspended)	28 October 1999
154	Timor-Leste	20 May 2002
155	Montenegro	12 July 2006
156	Monaco	30 November 2006
—	Cook Islands	April 2008
157	South Sudan	28 July 2011
158	United Arab Emirates	15 September 2020
159	Bahrain	18 October 2020
160	Bhutan	12 December 2020
161	Morocco	22 December 2020
—	Kosovo	1 February 2021
—	Niue	3 August 2023
—	Somaliland	26 December 2025

=== No diplomatic relations ===
==== Member states of the United Nations ====
As of 2025, 30 United Nations member states do not maintain diplomatic relations with Israel (period of former relations marked in parentheses):

- Africa: Algeria, Comoros, Djibouti, Libya, Mali (1960–1973), Mauritania (1999–2009), Niger (1960–1973, 1996–2002), Somalia, Tunisia (trade relations 1996–2000)

(Algeria, Libya, and Somalia do not recognise Israel)

- Americas: Belize (1985–2023), Cuba (1950–1973), Nicaragua (1948–2024), Venezuela (1950–2009)
- East Asia: North Korea (does not recognise Israel as a state)
- Middle East: Iran (1948–1951, 1953–1979), Iraq, Kuwait, Lebanon, Oman (trade relations 1996–2000), Qatar (trade relations 1996–2009), Saudi Arabia, Syria, Yemen

(Iran, Iraq, Kuwait, Lebanon, Saudi Arabia, Syria and Yemen do not recognise Israel as a state)

- South and Central Asia: Afghanistan, Bangladesh, Maldives (1965–1974), Pakistan

(Afghanistan, Bangladesh and Pakistan do not recognise Israel as a state)

- Southeast Asia: Brunei, Indonesia, Malaysia

(none of these countries recognise Israel)

Despite the lack of diplomatic relations, some of these countries accept Israeli passports and acknowledge other indications of Israeli sovereignty.

==== Other states ====
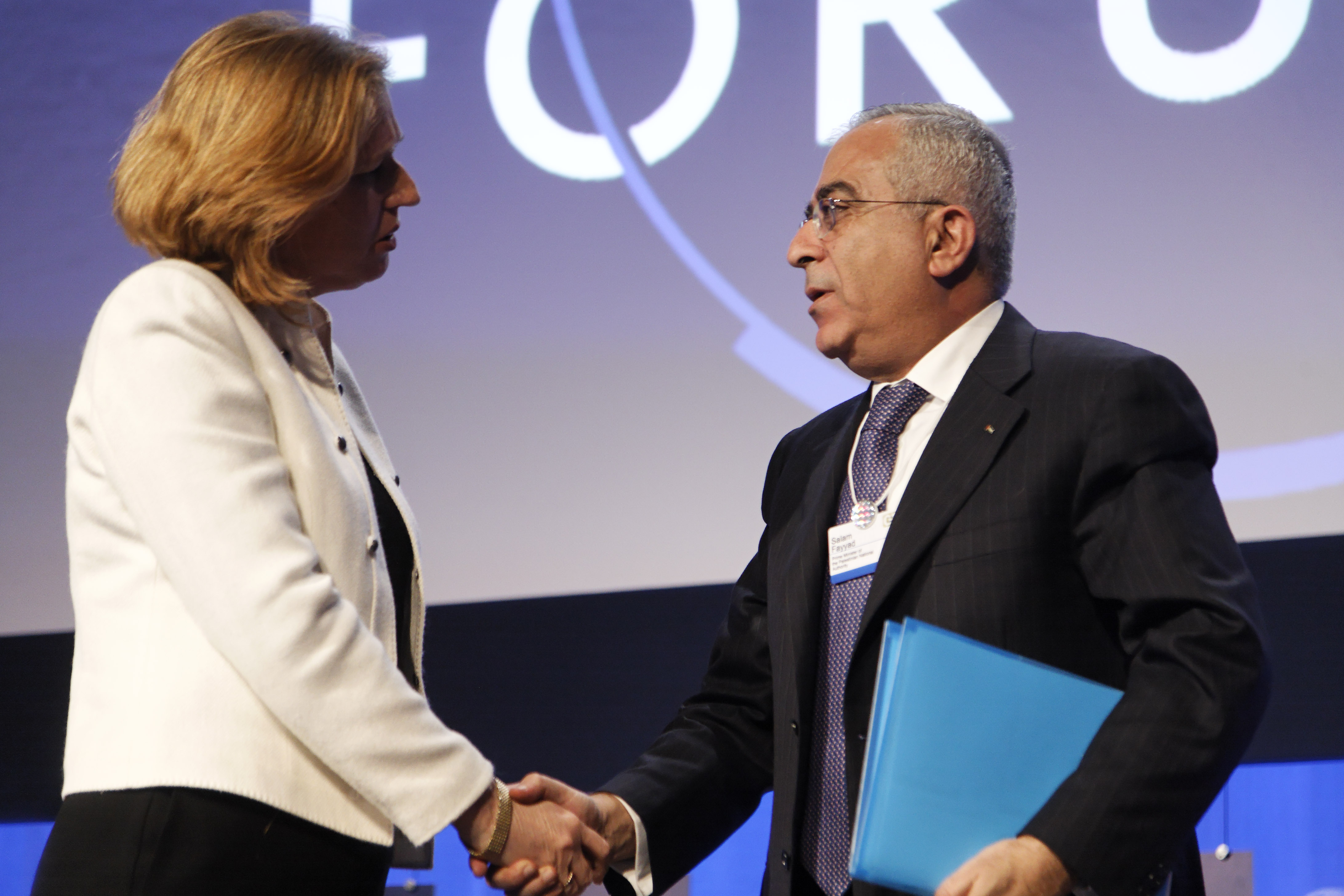
Tzipi Livni shaking hands with Salam Fayyad, 2008

Israel has no diplomatic relations with the following states or entities:

- Taiwan (Republic of China), which recognizes Israel, but does not officially conduct relations (though there are unofficial relations) because of Israel's recognition of the People's Republic of China.
- Other states with limited recognition: Abkhazia, Northern Cyprus, Sahrawi Arab Democratic Republic, South Ossetia, Transnistria (Israel has not recognised the independence of any of these entities)
- Sovereign Military Order of Malta

=== Limited relations ===
Comoros has no official diplomatic ties with Israel but the countries engage in mutual trade.

Israeli citizens are admitted into North Korea with Israeli passports, but like other foreign visitors they are asked to deposit their passport with the local authorities and use specially issued local documents for tourists.

== International opinion ==
Share of Americans that sympathise more with Israelis or Palestinians. Gallup, 2001–2026.

A 2026 global study by Pew Research Center found that Israel was viewed negatively in 32 out of 36 countries surveyed, (Note: The 36 countries surveyed were Argentina, Australia, Bangladesh, Brazil, Canada, Chile, Colombia, France, Germany, Ghana, Greece, Hungary, India, Indonesia, Italy, Japan, Kenya, Malaysia, Mexico, Netherlands, Nigeria, Pakistan, Peru, Philippines, Poland, Singapore, South Africa, South Korea, Spain, Sri Lanka, Sweden, Thailand, Turkey, the United Kingdom, the United States and the West Bank/East Jerusalem.) with the median view 25% favorable and 67% unfavorable. Only Kenya, Nigeria, Ghana and India held positive views of Israel, and all other countries except Sri Lanka had a majority unfavorable to Israel. Pew found that since 2025, opinion of Israel declined in 13 out of 24 countries, improving in only one (Greece). The largest declines were in South Korea, Italy, Germany, Argentina and Nigeria. Israeli Prime Minister Benjamin Netanyahu was viewed negatively by majorities in 32 out of 36 countries, and confidence in him declined in 13 out of 24.

Israel ranked last out of fifty countries in 2024 and 2025 in the Anholt Nation Brands Index, a survey of national reputations conducted by Ipsos in 20 countries (Note: Argentina, Australia, Brazil, Canada, China, France, Germany, India, Italy, Japan, Mexico, Poland, Russia, Saudi Arabia, South Africa, South Korea, Sweden, Turkey (Türkiye), the United Kingdom, and the United States) representing 70% of the world's population. The 6% fall in 2025 was Israel's fastest decline in 20 years of measurement, and was accompanied by the widespread perception that Israel is an illegitimate state.

Polling by Gallup found that in 2026 the US public sympathized more with the Palestinians than the Israelis for the first time since polling began in 2001. The share sympathizing more with the Israelis increased from 51% in 2001 to a peak of 64% in 2018, before declining to 54% in 2023 and 36% in 2026. Those sympathizing more with the Palestinians increased from 16% in 2001 to 19% in 2018, 31% in 2023 and then 41% in 2026. According to Pew Research Center, between March 2022 and March 2026 the share of Americans with a favorable view of Israel declined from 55% to 37%, while those with an unfavorable view increased from 42% to 60%.

The YouGov EuroTrack survey of six European countries (Note: France, Germany, Spain, Italy, Denmark and the United Kingdom.) found that views of Israel declined sharply between 2023 and 2025 in all six countries, reaching their lowest point since recording began in 2016. Between 63% and 70% in every country had a negative view, and 13% to 21% a positive view, with few Europeans believing Israel's attacks on Gaza to be justified. In July 2024, YouGov found that large majorities in seven European countries (Note: France, Germany, Spain, Italy, Sweden, Denmark and the United Kingdom.) of between 62% and 74%, and 49% in the US, believed that Israel had committed war crimes in Gaza, versus 8–12% and 26%, respectively, that did not.

In July 2026, YouGov found that Americans thought by 43% to 24% that Israel was committing genocide in Gaza, and by 49% to 27% that Netanyahu should be arrested if he entered the US.

In September 2025, The Washington Post found that 61% of Jewish Americans thought Israel had committed war crimes against Palestinians, while 29% did not, and 39% thought it had committed genocide, while 51% did not.

== North Africa and Middle East ==
Recognition of both Israel and Palestinian State Recognition of Palestinian State only Recognition of Israel only

On 1 October 1994, the Persian Gulf states announced their support for a review of the Arab boycott, abolishing the secondary and tertiary boycotts against Israel.

=== Algeria ===
Algeria and Israel presently do not have diplomatic relations.

In the mid-1990s, while Israel and North African states slowly established diplomatic relations, Algeria remained one of the last countries to consider such a move. It was only when Israeli prime minister Ehud Barak met Algerian President Abdelaziz Bouteflika at the funeral of King Hassan II of Morocco on 25 July 1999 that comments about rapprochement were made.

=== Bahrain ===
In 2011, amid Arab spring uprising, Wikileaks cables published on Haaretz revealed some of the hidden relations between Bahraini and Israeli officials. In a meeting with the U.S. ambassador in February 2005, Bahrain's king, Hamad bin Isa Al Khalifa, had bragged about having contact with Israel's national intelligence agency, Mossad. He indicated that Bahrain was ready to develop relations in other fields as well. The king reportedly ordered officials to refrain from using terms such as "enemy" and "Zionist entity" to refer to Israel. However, he refused the idea of having trade relations, saying it was "too early" and would be postponed until the establishment of an independent Palestine state.

Both countries agreed to fully normalize relations in September 2020.

=== Egypt ===
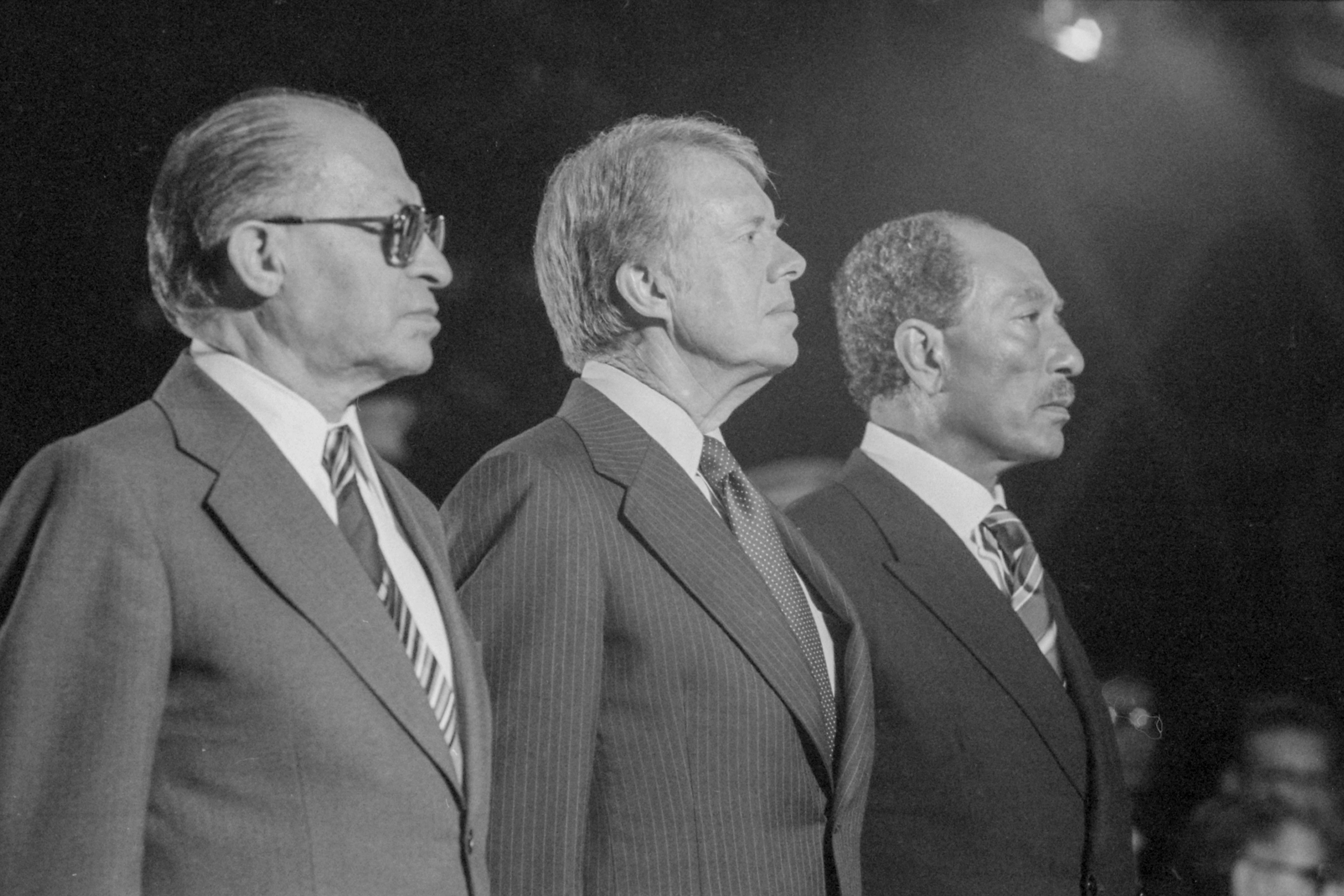
Menachem Begin, Jimmy Carter and Anwar Sadat at Camp David

Israel has had full diplomatic relations with Egypt since the signing of the Egypt–Israel peace treaty in 1979. In Israel, the 1978 Camp David Accords were supported by 85% of Israelis, according to a 2001 poll taken by the Jaffee Center for Strategic Studies, based in Israel.

However, Egyptian public opinion of Israel is highly negative. According to an Egyptian Government 2006 poll of 1,000 Egyptians (taken at the time of the 2006 Lebanon War), 92% of Egyptians view Israel as an enemy nation.

Egypt has mediated several unofficial ceasefire understandings between Israel and Palestinians, especially with the Hamas government in the Gaza Strip.

=== Iran ===
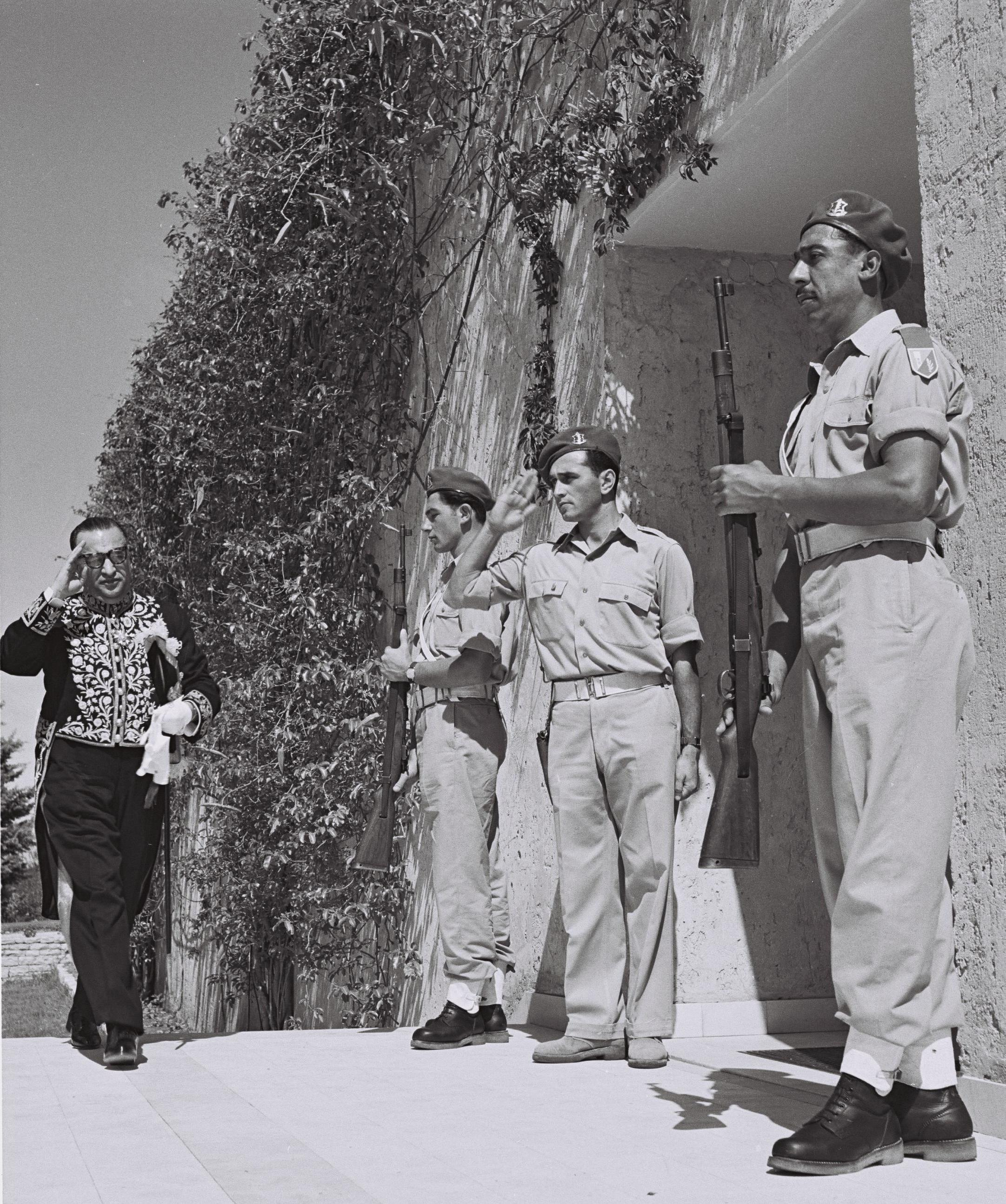
Iranian minister Reza Saffinia visiting the home of Israeli president Chaim Weizmann, 1950

Relations between Israel and Iran have alternated from close political alliances between the two states, during the era of the Pahlavi dynasty, to open hostility following the rise to power of Ayatollah Ruhollah Khomeini. While Iran was the second Muslim-majority country to recognize Israel, the two states do not currently have diplomatic relations with each other, due to Iran's withdrawal of its recognition of Israel. The post-1979 Iranian authorities avoid referring to Israel by its name, and instead use the terms "the Zionist regime" or "occupied Palestine". Iranian passports bear an inscription that says, "The bearer of this passport is forbidden from traveling to occupied Palestine."

Due to recent rhetoric between Iran and Israel, development of nuclear technology, and Iranian funding of the groups Hamas and Hezbollah, tensions have risen dramatically between the State of Israel and the Islamic Republic of Iran, especially after the election of the hardline Mahmoud Ahmadinejad in 2005. Comments made by Ahmadinejad, who has called the Holocaust "a myth" and for Israel to be "wiped off the map", were perceived by Israel as threats of destruction.

A large population of Iranian Jews lives in Israel, among them former president of Israel Moshe Katsav, former chief of staff / Defense Minister Shaul Mofaz, and former chief of staff Dan Halutz.

=== Iraq ===
No diplomatic relations between Israel and Iraq ever existed, but the issue of establishing such relations was given some consideration. Following the American-British led invasion of Iraq in 2003, diplomats had been discussing the possibility of establishing diplomatic relations between Israel and Iraq. However, then-Iraqi Prime Minister Iyad Allawi said in 2004 that Iraq would not establish ties with Israel.

==== Kurdistan Region ====
In 2006, President of Kurdistan Region Massoud Barzani said: "It is not a crime to have relations with Israel. If Baghdad established diplomatic relations with Israel, we could open a consulate in Hewlêr (Kurdistan)." Israeli television broadcast photographs from the 1960s showing Mustafa Barzani embracing then Israeli defense minister Moshe Dayan. In 2004, Israeli officials met with Kurdish political leaders. In 2006 the BBC reported that Israel was training Kurdish militias in Iraqi Kurdistan. In April 2012, it was alleged that high-ranking Kurdish officials had collected the revenues of Iraqi oil that had been smuggled to Israel via the Kurdistan Region.

=== Jordan ===
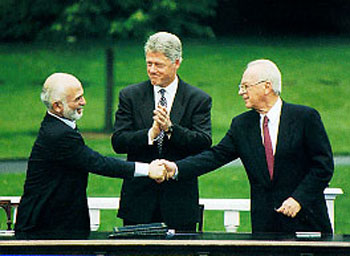
King Hussein, U.S. President Bill Clinton and Yitzhak Rabin, Israel-Jordan peace treaty

Israel has full diplomatic relations in peace with Jordan since the signing of the Israel–Jordan Treaty of Peace in 1994, but relations remain somewhat tense. Over half of the Jordanian populations descends from Palestinian refugees, who overwhelmingly have negative views of Israel.

=== Kuwait ===
Relations between Israel and Kuwait are generally hostile, mainly as part of the Arab–Israeli conflict. In 2019 Kuwait's Deputy Foreign Minister Khaled Al-Jarallah said "Kuwait will be the last country to normalize relations with Israel".

=== Lebanon ===
Israel and Lebanon have been overshadowed by war, including the Syrian Occupation of Lebanon (1976–2005). In August 2006, after the clash between Hezbollah and Israel, Lebanese Prime Minister Fouad Siniora said that Lebanon would be the "last Arab country to make peace with Israel" because of the large number of civilians that were killed in the 2006 Lebanon War.

Since the year 2000, and due to many wars with Hezbollah, Israel treats Lebanon as an "enemy state", although it is considering the possibility of a non-aggression pact.

In 2008 a Pew Research Center survey found that negative views concerning Jews were most common in Lebanon, with 97% of Lebanese having unfavorable opinion of Jews. In a 2011 survey again by the Pew Research Center, all of the Muslim-majority Middle Eastern countries polled held strongly negative views of Jews. In the questionnaire, only 3% of Lebanese reported having a positive view of Jews.

=== Morocco ===
Moroccan expeditionary forces fought alongside a coalition of Arab countries in the Yom Kippur War against Israel. In 1986, King Hassan II invited then Israeli Prime Minister Shimon Peres for talks, becoming the second Arab leader to host an Israeli leader after Anwar Sadat. Following the September 1993 signing of the Israeli-Palestinian Declaration of Principles, Morocco accelerated its economic ties and political contacts with Israel. In September 1994, Morocco and Israel announced the opening of bilateral liaison offices. When the king died in 1999, then-prime minister Ehud Barak and the Moroccan-born foreign minister David Levy flew to Rabat for his funeral. The foreign offices were closed in 2000 following sustained Israeli-Palestinian violence. In September 2016, Moroccan King Mohammed VI sent his personal adviser Andre Azulai, who is Jewish, to attend the state funeral of former Israeli Prime Minister and President Shimon Peres.

Prior to the establishment of formal relations, Israeli tourism to Morocco was encouraged by the World Federation of Moroccan Jewry, a non-governmental private Jewish organization.

On 10 December 2020, Morocco agreed to establish diplomatic relations with Israel in exchange for the United States supporting Morocco's claim on Western Sahara. On the same day, the United States agreed to the sale of sophisticated drones to Morocco.

=== Oman ===
In 1996, Oman and Israel agreed to exchange trade representation offices.

=== Qatar ===
Qatar and Israel do not currently have diplomatic relations, although they maintained economic relations between 1996 and 2000. Qatar is a major financial supporter of the Palestinian Sunni-Islamic fundamentalist group Hamas.

On 9 September, Israel conducted airstrikes on Qatar in an effort to eliminate the forthcoming Hamas leader. At that time, Hamas officials were engaged in discussions regarding a ceasefire. Numerous global leaders condemned Israel for the assault. Both US President Donald Trump and Germany, who are allies of Israel, denounced the attack on Qatar, labeling it a breach of Qatar's sovereignty.

=== Saudi Arabia ===
In 2005, Saudi Arabia announced the end of its ban on Israeli goods and services, mostly due to its application to the World Trade Organization, where one member country cannot have a total ban on another. However, as of August 2006, the Saudi boycott was not cancelled.

In recent years, Saudi Arabia has changed its viewpoint concerning the validity of negotiating with Israel. It calls for Israel's withdrawal from territory occupied in June 1967 in order for peace with the Arab states; then-Crown Prince Abdullah extended a multilateral peace proposal based on withdrawal in 2002. At that time, Israel did not respond to the offer. In 2007 Saudi Arabia again officially supported a resolution of the Arab–Israeli conflict which supported a full right of Palestinian refugees to move to Israel, which generated more official negative reactions from Israeli authorities.

=== Syria ===
Syria's relations with Israel are very poor, due to the Israeli occupation of the Golan Heights. Ba'athist Syria had close ties with the anti-Israel militant group Hezbollah and with the Islamic Republic of Iran.

Since 2004, Syria has accepted the import of apples from farmers in the Golan Heights, territory that it claims, through the Quneitra crossing. This was a result of the ongoing Israeli refusal to accept apples from Golan farmers (reportedly due to over-supply), which led to a plea by the farmers to the Syrian government to accept their produce before it became spoiled in order to prevent economic collapse. In 2010, some 10,000 tons of apples grown by Druze farmers in the Golan Heights were sent to Syria.

=== Tunisia ===
Tunisia participated in the Yom Kippur War, sending 1,000–2,000 troops to fight alongside a coalition of Arab countries against Israel. The relations worsened further in the early 2000s when the Second Intifada began, and on 22 October 2000, the state radio of Tunisia declared that President Ben Ali had decided to break all diplomatic ties with Israel following the "violence in the Palestinian-controlled territories".

=== Turkey ===
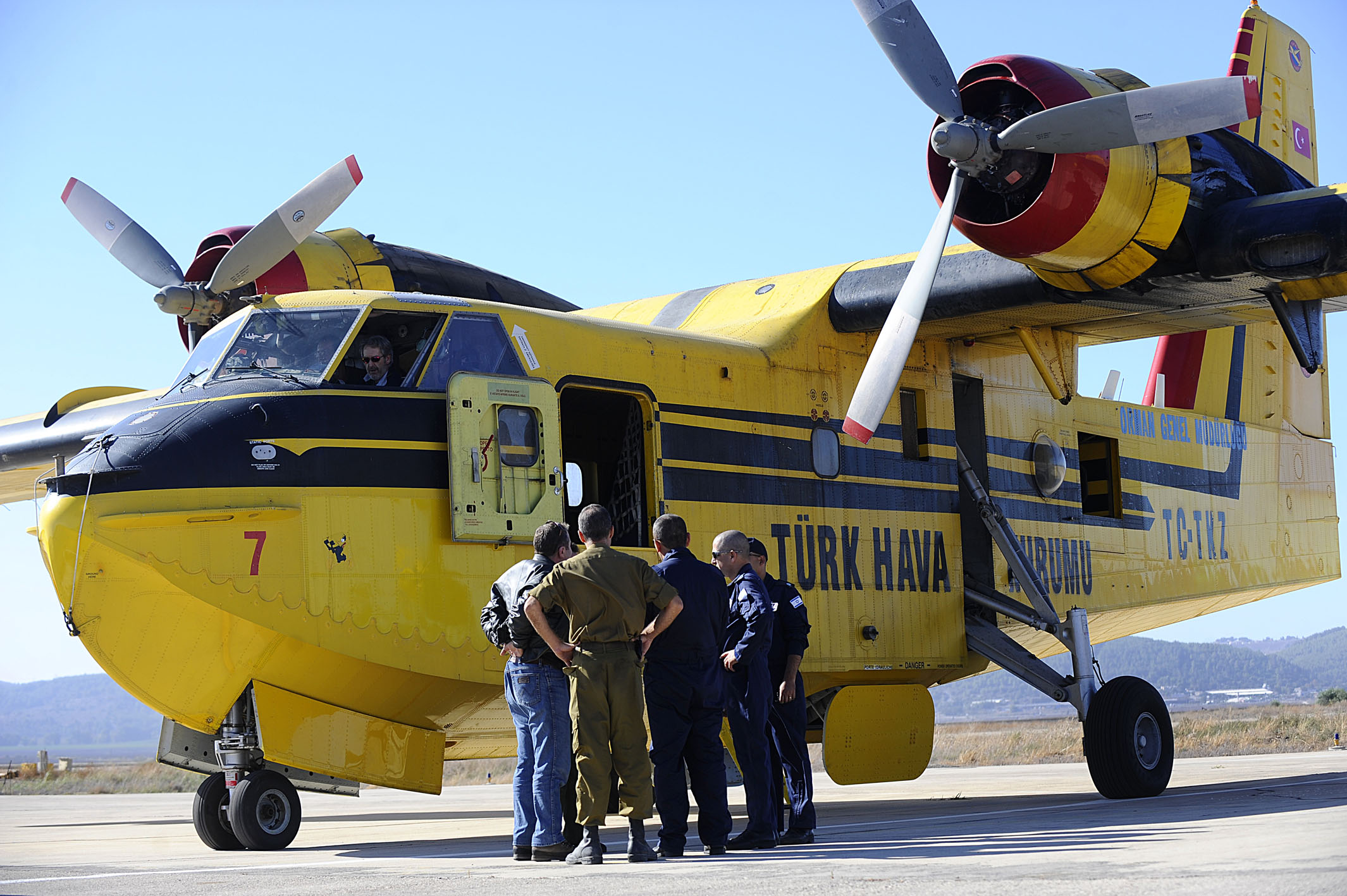
Turkish firefighting plane sent to aid Israel, 2010

Turkey was the first Muslim-majority nation to formally recognize the State of Israel.

In January 2009, the Turkish government's condemnation of the 2008–09 Gaza War severely strained relations between the two countries. Erdoğan harshly criticized Israel's conduct in Gaza at the World Economic Forum conference in Davos, Switzerland in early 2009.

Relations between the two countries were further strained after the 2010 Gaza flotilla raid. On 2 September 2011, Turkey downgraded ties with Israel to second secretary level and suspended military co-operation between the countries.

=== United Arab Emirates ===
Following the assassination of Mahmoud Al-Mabhouh in the UAE in 2010, allegedly by Israel, the UAE announced that travelers suspected of being Israeli would not be admitted even if using a foreign passport. Prior to 13 August 2020, UAE had not recognized Israel as a state, and the two countries lacked official diplomatic or economic relations. Prior to the announcement of the 2020 agreement, relations had improved to the extent that Israel opened an office in Abu Dhabi, albeit only as a mission to the International Renewable Energy Agency.

Israel and the United Arab Emirates announced a deal to establish diplomatic relations on 13 August 2020. In July 2021, The United Arab Emirates officially opened an embassy in Israel, becoming only the third majority Arab nation to have full diplomatic relations with Israel.

=== Yemen ===
Yemen and Israel do not have diplomatic relations, and contacts between the two countries are very tense. People with an Israeli passport or any passport with an Israeli stamp cannot enter Yemen, and Yemen is defined as an "enemy state" by Israeli law.

== Sub-Saharan Africa ==
Israel has diplomatic relations with 42 of the 44 Sub-Saharan African states that are not members of the Arab League, including a number of Muslim-majority states.

=== Angola ===
Relations between Israel and Angola are based on trade and foreign policy. In 2005, President José Eduardo dos Santos visited Israel. In March 2006, the trade volume between the two countries amounted to $400 million. The Israeli ambassador to Angola is Avraham Benjamin.

=== Botswana ===
The two countries established relations in 1993. Neither has a formal consulate or embassy in the other country, but the two governments have cooperated on several development initiatives. Six Israeli-centered diamond companies have operations in Botswana.

=== Cameroon ===
Henri Étoundi Essomba, ambassador of Cameroon to Israel in 2012, serves as the dean of the diplomatic corps in Israel.

Relations were cut off in the wake of the Yom Kippur war, but restored in 1986, and Cameroon and Israel now have many military and political ties, with Israel training and arming Cameroon's rapid reaction forces and Cameroon voting against many anti-Israel resolutions at the UN.

=== Chad ===
In November 2018, Chadian President Idriss Déby paid a visit to Israel. In January 2019, Prime Minister Netanyahu paid a visit to Chad and both nations re-established diplomatic relations. In February 2023, Chadian President Mahamat Deby visited Israel and opened a Chad embassy in the Ramat Gan town in Israel.

=== Djibouti ===
Although Israel does not have diplomatic or official trade relations with Djibouti (a member of the Arab League), following a meeting between officials of both countries in September 1995, plans were then announced to open liaison offices in the respective countries' capitals, prior to the possible establishment of diplomatic relations between the two states. However, such relations did not materialize.

=== Eritrea ===
Eritrea developed relations with Israel shortly after gaining its independence in 1993, despite protests among Arab countries. Israeli-Eritrean relations are close. The president of Eritrea has visited Israel for medical treatment. However, Eritrea condemned Israeli military action during the 2008–2009 Israel–Gaza conflict. Israeli-Eritrean ties are complicated by Israel's close ties to Ethiopia.

=== Eswatini ===
Israel established diplomatic relations with Eswatini in September 1968, immediately following that country achieving independence from the United Kingdom. Eswatini was one of only three Sub-Saharan African states (the others being Lesotho and Malawi) that continued to maintain full diplomatic relations with Israel in the aftermath of the Yom Kippur War in 1973, and has never severed such ties.

=== Ethiopia ===
In Africa, Ethiopia is Israel's main and closest ally in the continent, due to common political, religious and security interests. However, relations were severed between the years 1973 and 1989. Many towns in Ethiopia are named after biblical Israel settlements, including Ethiopia's third largest city of Nazret (Adama). Israel also provides expertise to Ethiopia on irrigation projects. Thousands of Ethiopian Jews (Beta Israel) live in Israel. In 2012, Israel appointed a Beta Israeli of Ethiopian origin, Beylanesh Zevadia, as ambassador to Ethiopia. In October 2020, Israeli Prime Minister Benjamin Netanyahu visited Ethiopia.

=== Ghana ===
Diplomatic relations with Ghana were established immediately following Ghanaian independence in 1957. Agreement on technical cooperation was concluded on 25 May 1962. On 24 May 1968, a trade agreement was concluded. A cultural cooperation agreement was concluded on 1 March 1973.

Relations were broken at the initiative of the government of Ghana on 28 October 1973, following the Yom Kippur war. Improvement in relations followed Israeli attempts to prevent Ghanaian support for the Palestinian Authority, which led to a state visit to Ghana by Israeli Minister of Foreign Affairs Avigdor Liberman in September 2009. During that visit, a bilateral agreement for agricultural cooperation was signed. Diplomatic relations were restored in September 2011.

=== Guinea ===
Diplomatic relations between Israel and the Republic of Guinea were established in 1958, but were strained due to the Cold War, as the Israeli government supported US policy while the government of Guinea took a pro-Soviet line. These relations were broken on 5 June 1967 when war broke out between Israel and Egypt in the Six-Day War. After Israel's support to Guinea during its fight against the Ebola virus, relations between the two states were restored on 20 July 2016.

=== Kenya ===
Diplomatic relations were established in December 1963. Israel has an embassy in Nairobi and Kenya has an embassy in Tel Aviv. In 2003, Kenya requested Israel's help in developing a national solar energy program. In 2006, Israel sent an 80-person search-and-rescue team to Kenya to save people trapped in rubble when a multistory building collapsed. Following the 2007 Kenyan presidential election Israel donated medicine to the Moi Teaching and Referral Hospital in Eldoret. In November 2017, Israeli Prime Minister Benjamin Netanyahu visited Kenya.

=== Lesotho ===
Lesotho was one of only three Sub-Saharan African states (the others being Eswatini and Malawi) that maintained full diplomatic relations with Israel in the aftermath of the Yom Kippur War in 1973.

=== Liberia ===
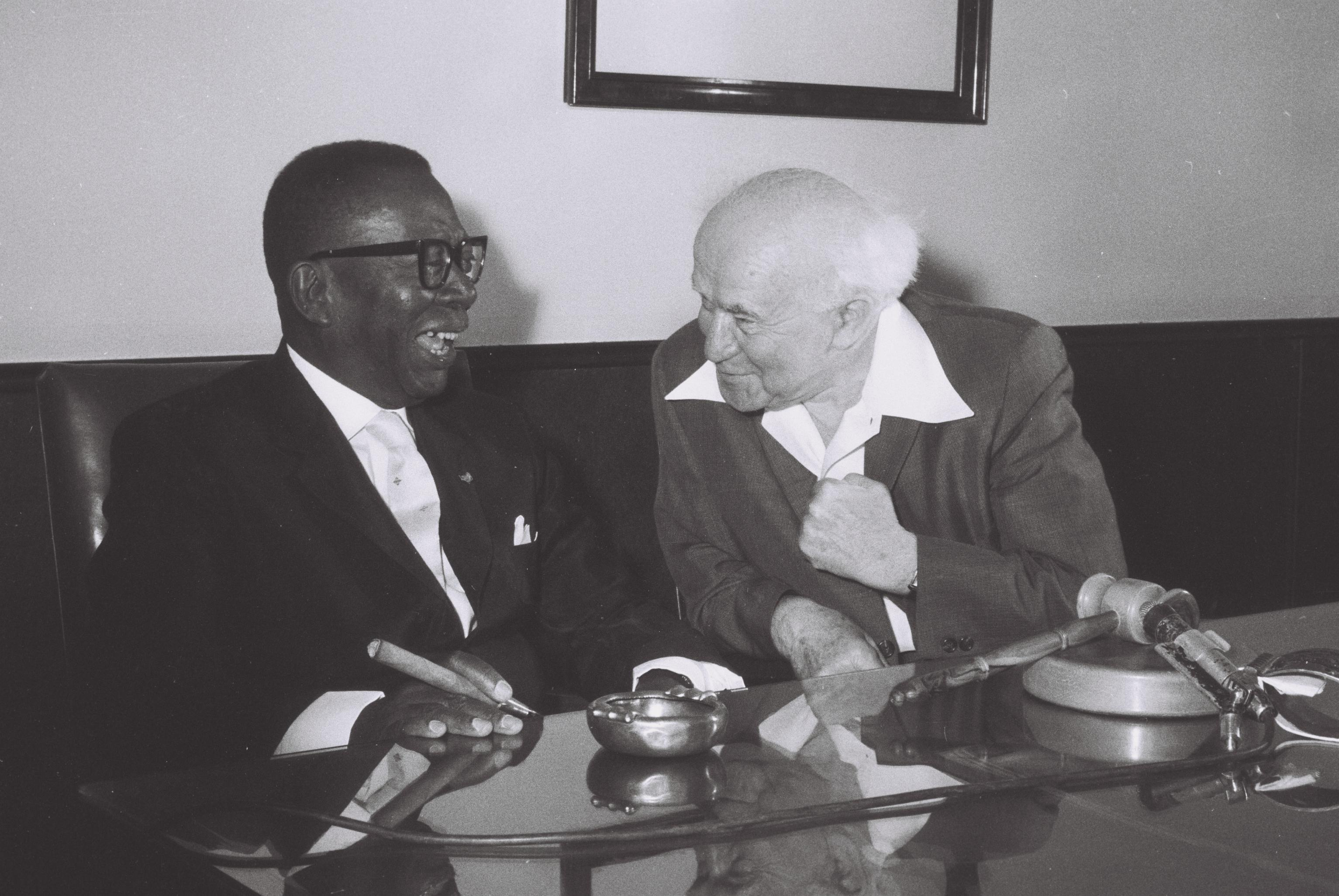
Liberian President William Tubman with David Ben-Gurion in 1962

Liberia was one of the United Nations member states to vote in favor of establishing a Jewish state in Palestine in 1947. Israel and Liberia established relations in the late 1950s. The administration of William Tolbert severed ties with the Israeli government in 1973 in response to the Yom Kippur War, but they were re-established in 1983 by Samuel Doe, who succeeded Tolbert via coup.

=== Madagascar ===
Both countries have a number of bilateral agreements in force.

=== Malawi ===
Israel established diplomatic relations with Malawi in July 1964, immediately following that country achieving independence from the United Kingdom. Malawi was one of only three Sub-Saharan African states (the others being Eswatini and Lesotho) that continued to maintain full diplomatic relations with Israel in the aftermath of the Yom Kippur War in 1973, and has never severed such ties.

=== Mauritania ===
Mauritania declared war on Israel as a result of the 1967 Six-Day War, following the Arab League's collective decision (although Mauritania was not formally admitted to the League until November 1973). Mautritania did not reverse that declaration until at least 1991.

Mauritania did not abide by moves to recognise Israel's right to exist in the same way as most other Arab countries later did, staying true to the 1967 Khartoum Resolution which, in reference to Israel, stated "no peace, no recognition, no negotiable."

Little public information exists, and an account of Israeli-Mauritanian relations must be inferred from a number of indirect known factors, such as: behind the scenes meetings between Mauritania and Israel in 1995 and 1996, said to be at the instigation of Mauritania's President Ould Taya; the establishment of unofficial "interest sections" in the respective Spanish embassies in 1996 in the two capital cities, leading to the exchange of diplomatic representatives in each other's countries from 27 October 1999. It is inferred from this evidence that Mauritania had reversed its declaration by then.

On 6 March 2009, the Israeli diplomatic delegation to Mauritania left after nine years of diplomatic ties, following a demand from the Mauritanian authorities to close the Israeli embassy in Nouakchott within 48 hours. The Mauritanian delegation to Israel left earlier without sending official notice to the Israeli Ministry of Foreign Affairs.

=== Mauritius ===
Both countries have signed many bilateral agreements.

=== Nigeria ===
Israel and Nigeria established diplomatic relations in 1960. In 1973, Nigeria broke off contacts with Israel, but in May 1992, bilateral relations were restored. Since April 1993, Israel has maintained an embassy in Abuja, and Nigeria has maintained an embassy in Tel Aviv. Many Nigerians go on religious pilgrimage to Israel.

=== Rwanda ===
Relations with Rwanda were established soon following independence of the African state. They were broken by the government of Rwanda on 8 October 1973, during the Yom Kippur war.

In January 2019, transportation ministers of Israel and Rwanda announced plans to inaugurate regular Air Rwanda flights to Israel. Then, in April 2019, Israel opened an embassy in Kigali.

In 2016, Israeli Prime Minister Benjamin Netanyahu visited Rwanda. In 2017, Rwandan President Paul Kagame visited Israel. In 2024, Israeli President Isaac Hergoz visited Rwanda to attend the 30th commemoration of the 1994 Genocide against the Tutsi.

=== Senegal ===
Relations with Senegal were established soon following independence of the African state. They were broken by the government of Senegal on 28 October 1973, following the Yom Kippur war. Israel and Senegal on 4 June 2017, announced the resumption of full diplomatic relations, which had been frozen after Senegal cosponsored a UN Security Council against Israeli settlements. Israel returned its ambassador to Senegal, and Senegal backed Israel's candidacy for observer status at the African Union. In a trilateral partnership between Israel, Italy and Senegal, Israeli drip irrigation systems are being installed to help farmers in 12 districts of rural Senegal.

=== Somaliland ===
On 26 December 2025, Israel became the first UN member state to formally recognize Somaliland's sovereignty and independence.

Israel plans to immediately expand its relations with Somaliland through extensive cooperation in the fields of agriculture, health, technology, and economy.

=== South Africa ===
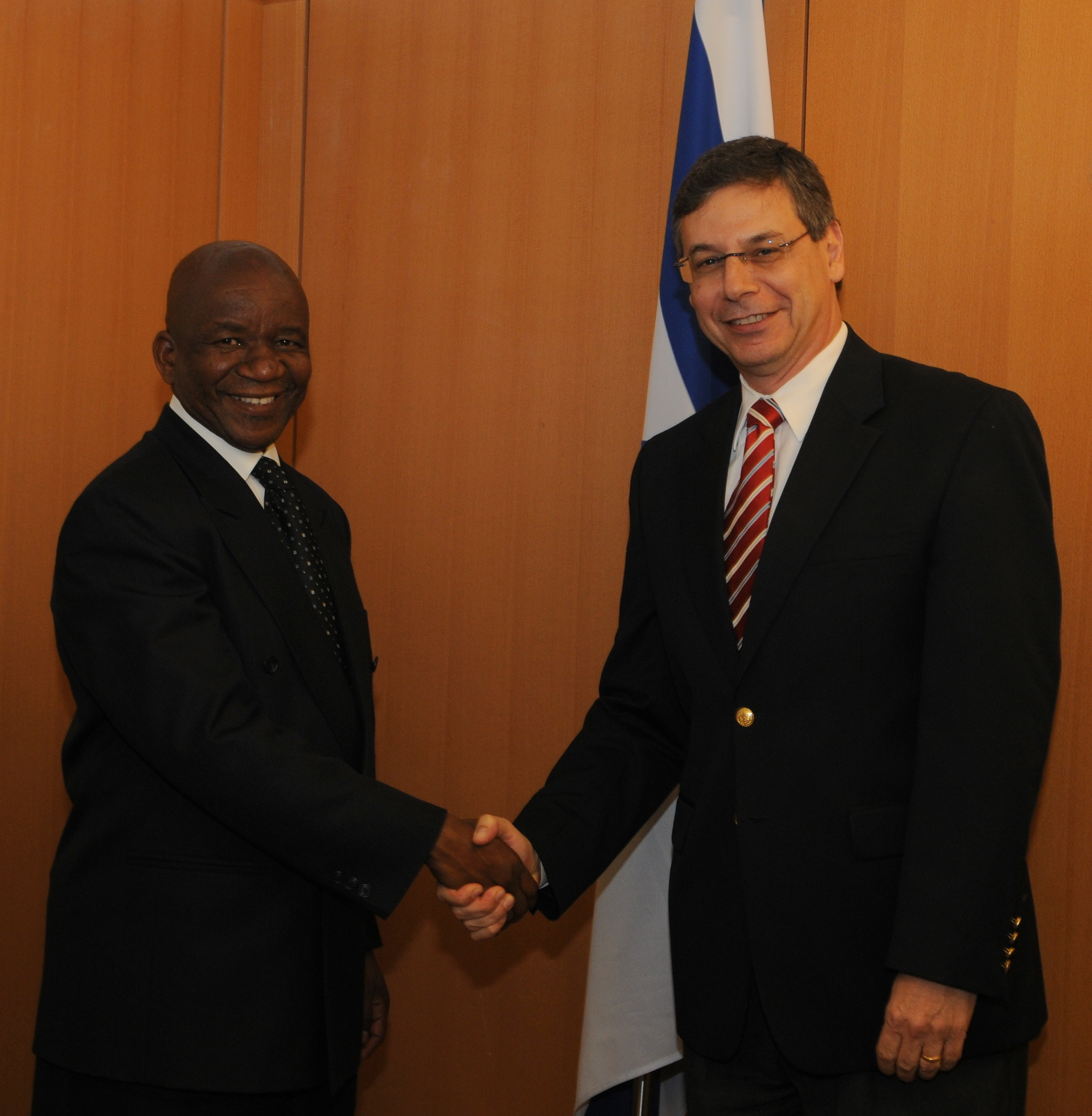
Danny Ayalon with South African Foreign Affairs DG Matjila

The Union of South Africa was one of only four Commonwealth nations to vote in favour of the 1947 UN partition resolution, which led to the establishment of the State of Israel. South Africa was one of the first states to recognize Israel; diplomatic relations between Israel and South Africa were established in 1948. After the Sharpeville massacre of 1960, Israel became a harsh critic of apartheid, leading to a break in its relations with Pretoria. After 1967, Israel and South Africa became strategic partners again, and this lasted until 1987 when Israel joined the West in forcefully opposing apartheid.

Since the end of apartheid, South Africa's new government has been cold toward Israel and critical of Israel's policies towards Palestinians but has nevertheless ignored calls from pro-Palestinian South African groups to sever relations between the two countries.

As a result of the Gaza war, the African National Congress passed a motion calling on the government to close its embassy in Tel Aviv in November 2023. The South African governmental cabinet also called on the International Criminal Court to issue an arrest warrant for Israeli Prime Minister Benjamin Netanyahu and recalled the country's ambassador to Israel and withdrew all the country's diplomatic staff from Israel.

=== South Sudan ===
Israel recognized the Republic of South Sudan on 10 July 2011, and offered the new state economic help, following its declaration of independence the previous day from the mainly Arab Muslim north Sudan. On 15 July 2011, South Sudan declared its intention to establish full diplomatic relations with Israel and, on 28 July 2011, it was announced that full diplomatic ties had been established between the two countries.

=== Sudan ===
On 23 October 2020, Sudan agreed to normalise relations with Israel in return for the Trump Administration removing Sudan from the United States' list of state sponsors of terrorism, unblocking economic aid and investment in Sudan.

=== Togo ===
In May 2009, Israel and Togo signed a "pact for cooperation in the economic, agricultural and educational fields" with each other.

=== Uganda ===
In a joint Israeli-Ugandan project, a professor from the Hebrew University of Jerusalem's Faculty of Agriculture conducted a survey of Lake Victoria with a Ugandan colleague from Makerere University. They found that Nile perch, introduced by the British sixty years ago, have decimated native fish populations, leading to malnutrition in the lakeside communities. She helped to set up artificial fish ponds to raise carp, which had disappeared from the local diet. The United States Agency for International Development sponsored the digging of the ponds and sent villagers to Kibbutz HaMa'apil in Emek Hefer to learn spawning techniques. Graduates of the training program established carp farms.

=== Zambia ===
Israel and Zambia maintained diplomatic relations from 1966 to 1973; they were re-established in 1991. Zambia opened its embassy in Tel Aviv in 2015, while Israel reopened its embassy in Lusaka in 2025.

=== Zimbabwe ===
Abel Muzorewa, the Prime Minister of Zimbabwe Rhodesia, visited Israel on 21 October 1983. He urged Robert Mugabe to establish diplomatic relations, saying his political policies hurt Zimbabwe's agriculture and technology industries. In March 2002 an Israeli company sold riot control vehicles to the Mugabe government, shortly before the nation's 2002 elections.

== Asia ==
In addition to Turkey and Azerbaijan, Israel has diplomatic relations with 5 non-Arab Muslim states in Asia (Kazakhstan, Kyrgyzstan, Tajikistan, Turkmenistan and Uzbekistan).

=== Afghanistan ===
Afghanistan, currently, has no relations with Israel. The Monarchy of Afghanistan did have spiritual relations with Israel, whether in secret or Tribal rules in place. The Afghan Royal Family trace their origins to King Saul of Israel. Afghanistan was the only Muslim country that did not revoke citizenship when Jews, also known as descendants of Judah, migrated to Israel. Rabbi Eliyahu Avichail has published numerous books linking the Afghans to the Lost Tribes of Israel.

=== Bangladesh ===
Both the Israeli government and general public supported the Bangladesh Liberation War. After the independence of Bangladesh in 1971, Israel offered to recognise the new born country in as early as 1972 but Bangladesh immediately rejected the offer.

Bangladesh does not recognize Israel as legitimate and officially forbids its citizens to travel to Israel by putting 'Valid for travel to all countries except Israel' on Bangladeshi passports. Bangladesh supports a sovereign Palestinian state and an end to Israel's "illegal occupation of Palestine".

=== Cambodia ===
Israel established diplomatic ties with Cambodia in 1960. Ties were cut in 1975 due to the rise of the Khmer Rouge. The ties were restored in 1993. Israel has no embassy in Cambodia and Cambodia has no embassy in Israel. Instead, the Israeli embassy in Bangkok, Thailand, is accredited to Cambodia. Cambodian students study agriculture in Israel.

=== China ===
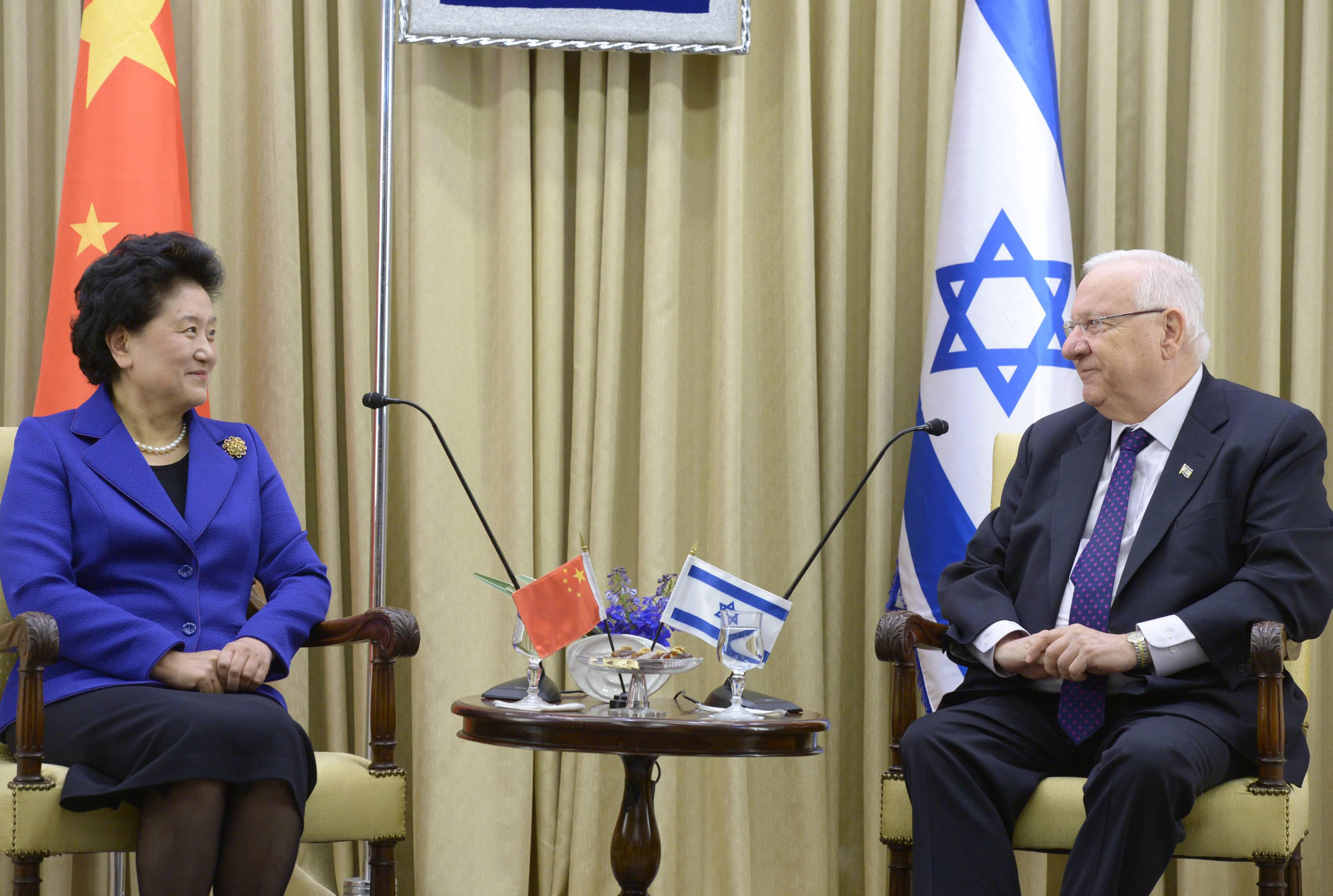
Israeli President Reuven Rivlin meeting with Chinese Vice Premier Liu Landung on a visit to Israel

On 9 January 1950, the Israeli government extended recognition to the People's Republic of China, but diplomatic relations were not established until January 1992.

Since 1992, Israel and China have developed increasingly close strategic economic, military, cultural and technological links with each other. Israel maintains an embassy in Beijing, Shanghai, and Chengdu—with the third subsequently closed on 15 July 2026 due to diplomatic reorganization with both countries. China is Israel's third largest trading partner globally and largest trading partner in East Asia. Trade volume increased from $50 million in 1992 to over $10 billion in 2013. Shared commonalities and similarities between the cultures and values of the two nations with ancient roots dating back thousands of years as well as convergence of interests have made the two countries natural partners. In addition, China is one of the few countries in the world to concurrently maintain warm relations with Israel, the Palestinians, and the Muslim world at large.

China's status as a potential world power has prompted Israel to maintain closer ties with China by integrating China's global influence with Israel's pragmatic economic management, political stability and its regional strategic importance in the Middle East. Beijing has appreciated Israel's political stability and diplomatic ingenuity and sees the Jewish state as one of the regional pillars for securing China's influence in the Middle East and the entire world.

China and Israel have developed close strategic military links with each other. Bilateral military relations have evolved from an initial Chinese policy of secret non-official ties to a close strategic partnership with the modern and militarily powerful Israel. Israel and China began extensive military cooperation as early as the 1980s, even though no formal diplomatic relations existed. Israel has provided China with military assistance, expertise and technology. According to a report from the United States-China Economic and Security Review Commission, "Israel ranks second only to Russia as a weapons system provider to China and as a conduit for sophisticated cutting-edge military technology, followed by France and Germany." Israel was ready to sell China the Phalcon, an Israeli airborne early-warning radar system (AWACS), until the United States forced it to cancel the deal. Some estimate that Israel sold arms worth US$4 billion to China in this period. China has looked to Israel for the arms and military technology it cannot acquire from the United States and Russia. Israel is now China's second-largest foreign supplier of arms after Russia. China has purchased a wide array of military equipment and technology, including communications satellites. China is a vital market for Israel's aerospace and defense industry. Due to Israel's recognition of China, Israel has also limited its cooperation with Taiwan in order to foster closer ties with mainland China.

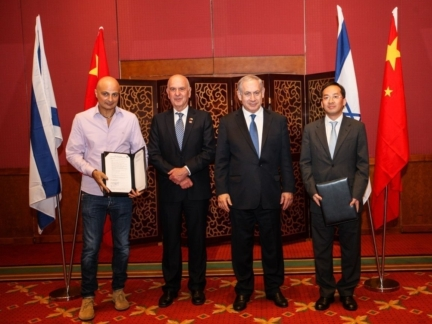
Benjamin Netanyahu and Matan Vilnai on a 2013 bilateral visit in China

Since the establishment of diplomatic relations, cultural exchange has been a major component of bilateral relations, as both sides recognize the importance of creating a strong foundation based on their ancient and rich histories. China's receptive and friendly embrace of the Jewish people on its soil has been one of affectionate sympathy as the Chinese have developed a favorable view of Jews, admiring them for their contributions to humanity, their ability to survive, the sharing of Chinese values such as family, frugality, hard work and education, and being products of ancient civilizations have been an impetus towards the long and enduring friendship between the Chinese and Jewish peoples. Shared affinities and similar cultural commonalities has not only been an impetus for the close bonds between China and Israel but has also created a symbol of brotherhood between the two communities.

Though Israel established diplomatic relations with China in 1992, the ties between the Chinese and Jewish people remain centuries old in addition to Israel and China being products of ancient civilizations dating back thousands of years. The cultural similarities between the Chinese and Jewish civilizations with both nations originating thousands of years ago have drawn the two countries closer together making the two countries natural partners in the international community. Chinese Jews have been a major impetus in maintaining the strong nexus between the Chinese and Jewish civilizations. Jews remain a small minority in China, but unlike many parts of the world, Jews have historically lived in China without any instances of antisemitism from the Han majority populace contributing to mutual respect and admiration between the two peoples. With the intrinsic affinity that the Chinese people feel for the Jews, relations between the two communities have been mutually close, harmonious and friendly, due to shared common cultural similarities between the two peoples resulted Jews enjoying equal rights and coexisting peacefully alongside the mainstream Han Chinese populace with instances of Jews assimilating into the Han Chinese community through intermarriage. On a geopolitical scale, China has sought to maintain close relations with the Jewish state as Israel's regional importance, stability and influence in an otherwise volatile region has been an important asset for the expansion of China's influence in the Middle East and the entire world. Shared commonalities and similarities between the cultures and values of the two nations, ancient roots as well as convergence of interests have driven the two countries closer with respect to scientific, economic, diplomatic and cultural ties.

China is one of Israel's closest economic allies in East Asia where both countries have placed considerable importance on maintaining a strategic and economic relationship. The economic synergy has served the two respective countries greatly where Israel's global technological prowess combined with China's global economic influence, industrial manufacturing capabilities, and marketing expertise made cooperation between the two nations inevitable. China including Hong Kong is Israel's second top export destination after the United States and has been the top market for Israeli exports in East Asia. China is also Israel's third largest trading partner and export market after the United States and the European Union with China being Israel's largest export market in East Asia. Israel has sought China's enormous global influence on world affairs, large consumer market, broad industrial manufacturing scale, and burgeoning economic dynamism while China has sought Israel as a powerhouse of advanced technological wizardry and a wellspring of entrepreneurial acumen leveraging each other's complementary capabilities and resources. China has sought Israel's technology to increase its international economic competitiveness and risk management. With the advice and experience of Jewish entrepreneurs, innovators, and inventors from the high-technology sectors, China has utilized Israel's indispensable economic and technological contributions to foster its long-term economic development. China has also expressed desire for Israel's advanced technologies, particularly in fields related to agriculture, telecommunications, and defense. The scientific and technological advancements made by Israel have led many Chinese politicians to respect the country's ingenuity and creative inventiveness because they know of the contributions Israel has made to its economy. Israeli agricultural techniques, most notably drip irrigation, and solar energy technologies are seen as crucial to China's economic development. Throughout Israel's early economic history, many Israeli startup companies were acquired by major U.S. and Western European corporations. Since the 2010s, China and Israel enhanced bilateral economic ties with China connecting both Chinese and Israeli businessmen and investors to invest in each other's economies respectively. Chinese economic cooperation with Israel has seen substantial Chinese investment of more than US$15 billion in the Israeli economy, spawning seed capital in Israeli startup companies, as well as the acquisition of Israeli companies by major Chinese corporations that incorporate Israel's know how to help the invigorate the development of the modern Chinese economy more efficiently. China now ranks second after the United States in collaboration with Israeli high-tech firms that are backed by Israel's Office of the Chief Scientist. Major Chinese firms such as Fosun, ChemChina, Brightfood, Horizons Ventures and China Everbright have invested significant amounts of financial capital and resources across numerous Israeli industries. Chinese businessmen and major Chinese corporations hold Israel's business, economic and entrepreneurial acumen and technological expertise with high esteem and have sought to integrate Israel's know-how with China's marketing proficiency, industrial manufacturing capacity and aptitude for large consumer market scaling.

=== Hong Kong ===
Israel and Hong Kong have full diplomatic ties as part of Israel's diplomatic ties with China. Israel has a consulate in the city, while Hong Kong is represented in Israel by the Chinese embassy in Tel Aviv.

=== India ===
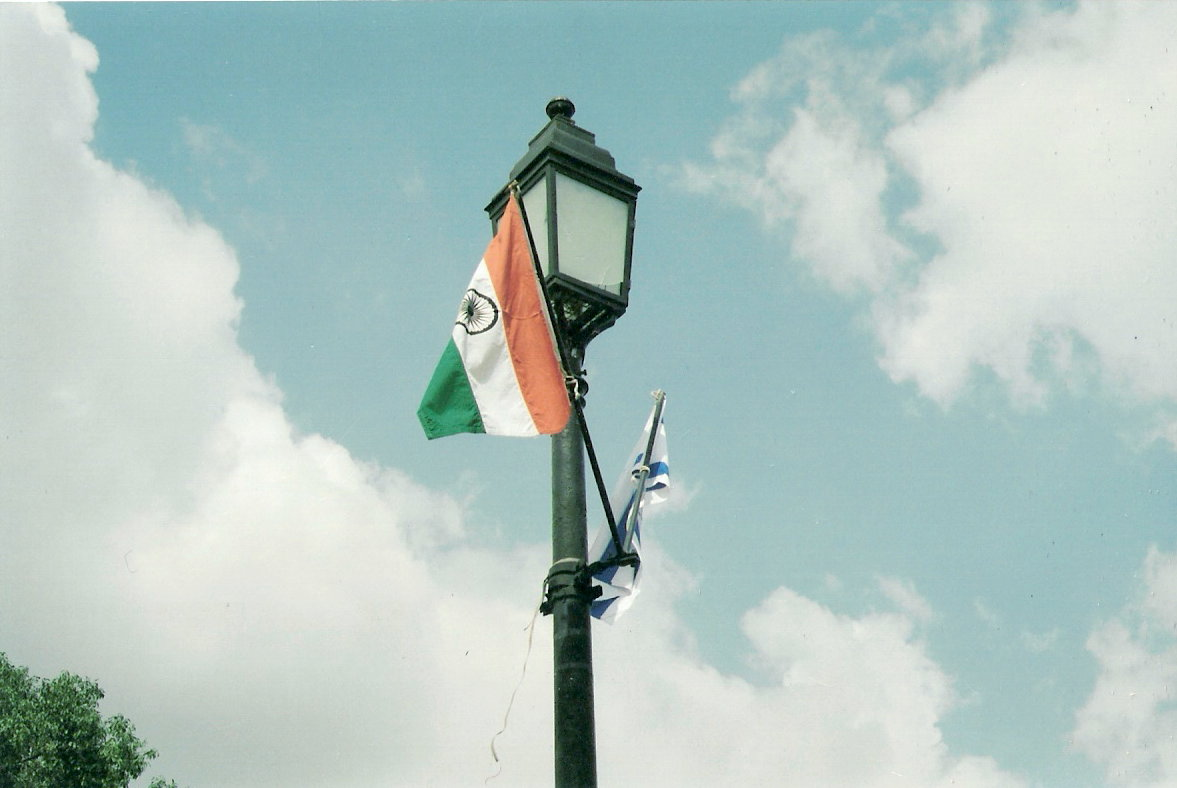
Indian and Israeli flags in New Delhi during Ariel Sharon's visit, September 2003

India established diplomatic relations with the State of Israel in 1992 and has since become Israel's strongest ally in Asia. The two countries cooperate in anti-terrorist activities in the Middle East and Southern Asia. Israel is India's second largest arms provider and India is Israel's principal arms market, and the trade volume between the two countries has increased significantly in the past few years. Co-operation has taken place in the space sector as well with India launching Israeli satellites. India became the top source market for Israel from Asia in 2010 with 41,000 tourist arrivals in that year.

Israel and India share intelligence on terrorist groups. They have developed close defense and security ties since establishing diplomatic relations in 1991. In 2009, Israel overtook Russia as India's biggest arms supplier; the U.S. even gave Israel approval to sell the Phalcon to India after earlier forcing Jerusalem to cancel a similar deal with China. India has bought more than $5 billion worth of Israeli equipment since 2002. In addition, Israel is training Indian military units and discussing an arrangement to give Indian commandos instruction in counter-terrorist tactics and urban warfare. In December 2008, Israel and India signed a memorandum to set up an Indo-Israel Legal Colloquium to facilitate discussions and exchange programs between judges and jurists of the two countries. According to an international opinion survey conducted in 2009 on behalf of the Israeli Foreign Ministry, India is the most pro-Israel country in the world.

India-Israel relationship has been very close and warm under the premiership of Narendra Modi since 2014. In 2017, he was the first ever Prime Minister of India to visit Israel. India was the largest arms customer of Israel in 2017. Defence relations between the two countries are longstanding.

=== Indonesia ===
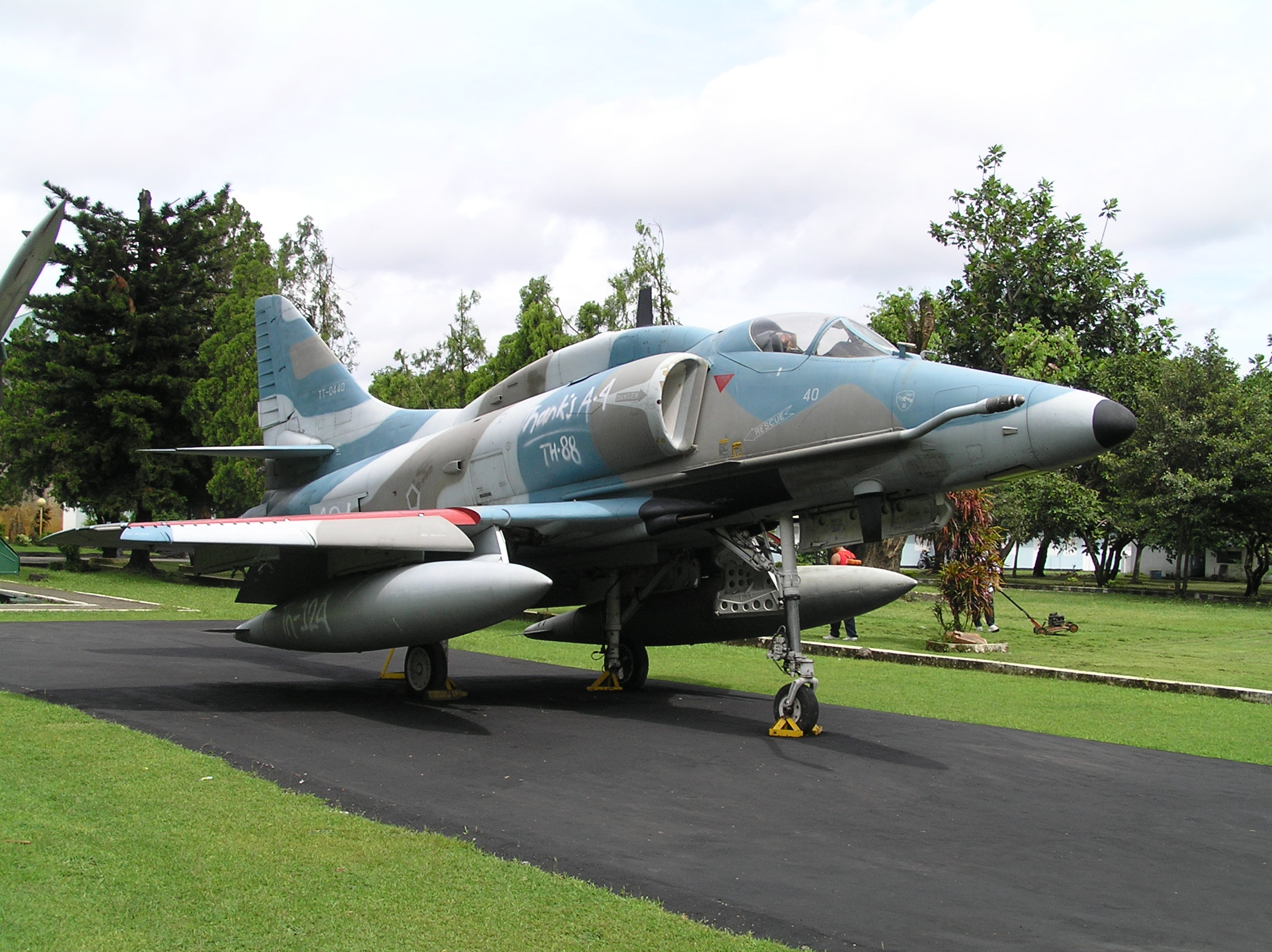
Indonesia purchased over 30 Douglas A-4 Skyhawks from Israel in the early 1980s, despite no recognition or diplomatic relations.

In 2012, Indonesia agreed to informally upgrade its relations with Israel and to open a consulate in Ramallah, headed by a diplomat with the rank of ambassador, who will also unofficially serve as his country's ambassador for contacts with Israel. The move, which was agreed upon after five years of sensitive deliberations, represents a de facto upgrading of relations between Israel and the world's most populous Muslim country. Indonesia has formally presented the move to open a West Bank consulate as a demonstration of its support for Palestinian independence. In fact, while the ambassador-ranked diplomat will be accredited to the Palestinian Authority/PLO, a significant portion of his work will be in dealings with Israel, and the office will fulfill substantial diplomatic duties as well as consular responsibilities. Israel and Indonesia quietly maintain trade, security and other relations. Israelis can get visas for Bali in Singapore, while many Indonesians come to Israel as pilgrims.

=== Japan ===
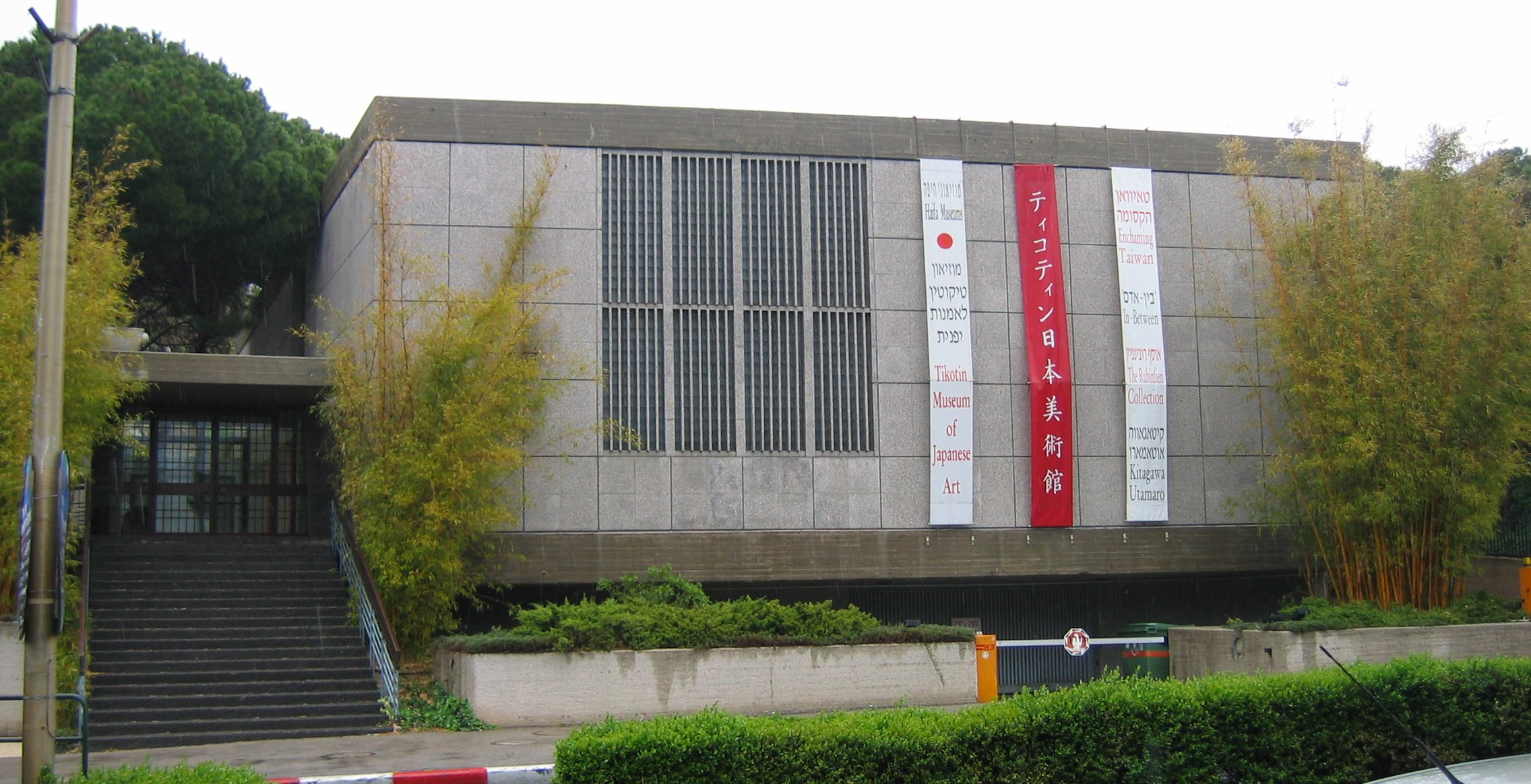
The Museum of Japanese Art, Israel

On 15 May 1952, diplomatic relations were established with Japan at a Legation level. However, the Japanese government refrained from appointing a Minister Plenipotentiary to Israel until 1955. Relations between the two states were distant at first, but after 1958, no break occurred, despite the Arab oil embargo on several countries, including Japan.

=== Kazakhstan ===
Both countries established diplomatic relations on 10 April 1992. The embassy of Israel in Kazakhstan opened in August 1992. The embassy of Kazakhstan in Israel opened in May 1996. Israel has an embassy in Astana and Kazakhstan maintains an embassy in Tel Aviv.

=== Malaysia ===
Israel and Malaysia do not maintain diplomatic relations and Malaysian passports do not allow entry into Israel. However, Malaysia and Israel has been engaged in trade relations; in 2011 Israel exported goods to Malaysia worth $716.4 million and imported goods worth $93.6 million. A report compiled by the European Commission indicated that in 2010 Malaysia ranked 15th among Israel's major trade partners, accounting for 0.8% (€667.6 million) of Israel's trade in that year.

=== Maldives ===
The Maldives established diplomatic relations with Israel in 1965 and severed them in 1974.

In 2009, under president Mohamed Nasheed, the Maldives signed cooperation agreements with Israel on tourism, health, and education and culture. In 2010, the Israeli government sent a team of eye doctors to treat patients and train local medical personnel in the Maldives. However, the renewed relationship did not develop into full diplomatic relations.

In July 2014, under president Abdulla Yameen, the Maldives terminated the cooperation agreements with Israel and announced a boycott of Israeli products, as Israel launched a military operation in Gaza. Foreign minister Dunya Maumoon also announced that the Maldives would fully support Palestinians at international forums such as the United Nations Human Rights Council and offer them humanitarian aid.

=== Mongolia ===
In October 1991 the official relationship of Mongolia and Israel began. Ariel Sharon visited in Mongolia in 2001, when he was prime minister in the Likud government. Israelis wishing to enter Mongolia are exempt from arming a visa in advance. The Mongolian immigration authorities tend to provide visitors to the country a 30 days visa on their arrival. One can extend the visa fee and the extension is at the discretion of the authorities.

An academic delegation from the Hebrew University in Jerusalem visited the Mongolian National University in August 2010. During the visit, an agreement was signed for cooperation between universities. In 2012, the Israeli Deputy Foreign Minister Danny Ayalon visited and signed an agreement with the Mongolian Minister of Education which included collaboration between universities and institutions of higher education, in which Mongolians will learn about Israel and the Holocaust and Israel will learn about the heritage and history of Mongolia. It was also agreed on expanding ties between the two countries and embassies.

=== Myanmar ===
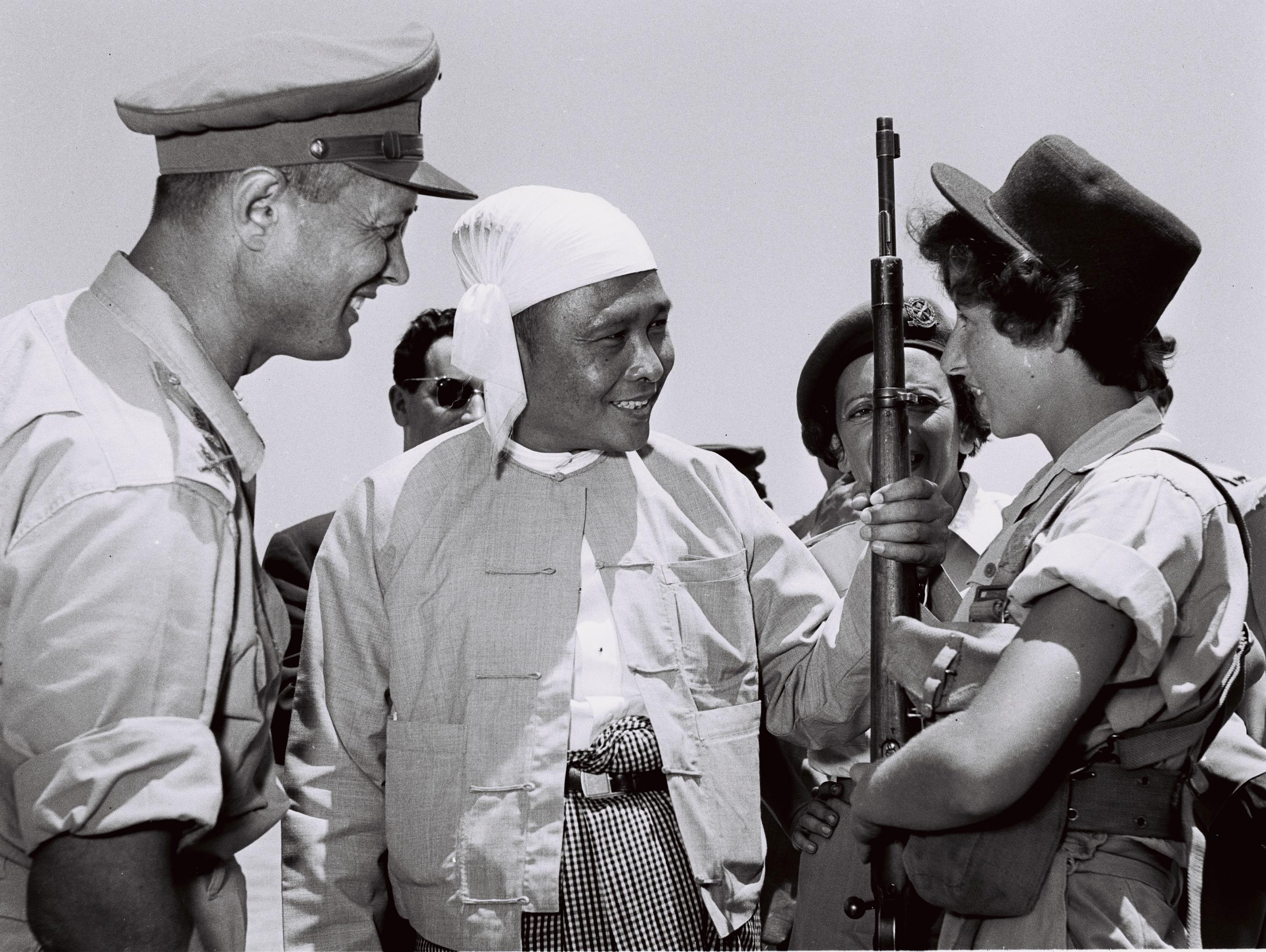
U Nu and Moshe Dayan in 1955

Myanmar (also known as Burma) was one of the first countries to recognize Israel and establish diplomatic relations with Israel. Myanmar has also become one of Israel's strongest allies in the region, in terms of both technical assistance and also the much debated and rumored military links. Premiers from both sides such as U Nu and David Ben-Gurion made state visits to each other's countries in the 1950s. Myanmar sends agriculture researchers to Israel for training. This was further cemented in Israel's aid assistance during the Cyclone Nargis disaster of May 2008.

=== Nepal ===
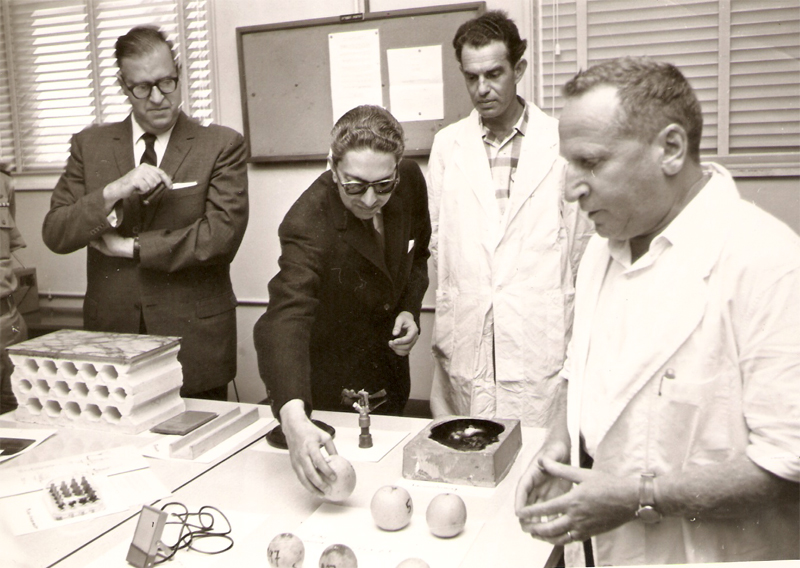
Abba Eban and the King of Nepal at Weizmann Institute, 1958

Israel–Nepal relations, first established in 1960, are based on mutual security concerns. Bishweshwar Prasad Koirala, Prime Minister of Nepal from 1959 to 1960, had a strongly pro-Israel foreign policy. King Mahendra visited Israel in 1963 and maintained Koirala's special relationship. Until the 1990s Nepal was the only South Asian country to have diplomatic ties with Israel.

Nepal is one of the few Asian countries to have consistently supported Israel at international forums and at the UN. Nepal has maintained diplomatic relations and continues to support the right of Israel to exist within secure and internationally recognized boundaries. Nepal voted in favour of Security Council Resolutions 242 (1967) and 338 (1973), which upheld the right of all the states in the region to live in peace. Nepal has also welcomed every initiative from whatever quarter that seeks to resolve the Middle East problems like the Camp David Accord signed between Egypt and Israel in 1978 and the renewed peace process sponsored time to time by countries like the USA.

After the 2015 Nepal earthquake, Israel was one of the first to send aid to Nepal. Israel sent a delegation of 264 people for Search & Rescue missions, and over 95 tons of equipment, including a field hospital. It is estimated that about 12,000 Nepalese foreign workers are residing in Israel, most of whom are women working as caregivers.

=== North Korea ===
North Korea does not recognise the state of Israel, denouncing it as an "imperialist satellite".

=== Pakistan ===
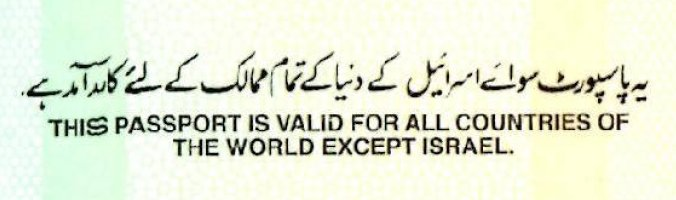
A Pakistani passport not valid for travel to Israel

Israel and Pakistan do not have diplomatic relations with each other, and Pakistani passports say 'This passport is valid for all countries of the World except Israel'. Israeli authorities told a traveller that Pakistanis could apply for a visa, and that they would issue a paper visa and put the entry and exit stamps on it. Some Israeli leaders have expressed the belief that should diplomatic relations with Pakistan be established, then Pakistan could serve as a bridge between Israel and the Muslim world. In 2008, the Israeli Foreign minister stated that "Israel considers Pakistan as its biggest strategic threat" in light of concern over the increasing Taliban threat in Pakistan.

=== Philippines ===
On 29 November 1947, the Philippines (a U.S. territory until 1946) was the only Southeast Asian nation at the time to support the partition resolution at the United Nations General Assembly recommending a Jewish State in Palestine. Israel and the Philippines established full diplomatic relationships in 1957. Embassies were opened in Tel Aviv and Manila in 1962. The two countries have enjoyed warm relations in all spheres. In 1997, the two countries signed a Memorandum of Understanding (MOU) institutionalizing the bilateral political dialogue between the respective foreign ministries. The political dialog is accompanied by cooperation in trade and economy, culture, technical assistance, science, academic exchanges, tourism etc. There are between 37,155 and 50,000 Filipino workers in Israel as of 2004.

=== Singapore ===
Singapore and Israel have maintained strong and mutually beneficial bilateral relations that are characterized by a close and amiable bond and amicable rapport, where the two nations have consistently cultivated a closely-knit and cordial relationship ever since their respective establishments. This is in part due to both countries' perception of themselves as diminutive yet affluent sovereign states and regional economic powerhouses surrounded by neighboring Islamic countries characterized by their comparatively underdeveloped societies, political instabilities, and economic struggles that have remained hostile to their continued existence in which oftentimes they have an uneasy relationship with. Following Singapore's sudden and unexpected independence after being unilaterally ejected from Malaysia in 1963, Singapore appealed to the international community for technical assistance and military aid. Israel responded by assisting the Southeast Asian city-state with the establishment of Singapore's armed forces. Both countries formally established diplomatic relations in May 1969, although unofficial and discrete relations were already established several years prior, particularly with regards to military activities. Singapore and Israel are also known to share a special relationship where they both enjoy an extensive bilateral security partnership, with Israeli and Singaporean arms contractors such as Israel Aerospace Industries and ST Engineering collaborating and engaging in joint venture developments and facilitating a large level of arms trade between the two countries. Over the years, Israel has continued to advise Singapore on an array of military affairs, ranging from night operations to aviation psychology. The defense and intelligence establishments of both countries conduct routine exchanges of information, and a small number of Israeli Defense Force officers serve in staff appointments within the Singapore Ministry of Defence (MINDEF). In 2012, it was reported that Singapore expressed interest in purchasing several Iron Dome defence system units and a deal took place in 2016.

=== South Korea ===
The Republic of Korea and the State of Israel established diplomatic relations on 10 April 1962. Israel opened its embassy in Seoul in April 1968, which was closed by the Israeli government in 1978. The embassy was reopened in January 1992, with Korea opening its resident embassy in Tel Aviv in December 1993.

On 23 August 2010, Korea Venture Investment Corp. (KVIC), a South Korean state-backed fund and investment management company, signed a memorandum of understanding with Israel's Vertex Venture Capital (VVC) to raise a US$150 million fund, which will be used to finance joint ventures or the merger and acquisition of small and medium-size venture capital firms between the two countries.

The two countries signed a free trade agreement in May 2021, making South Korea the first East Asian country to forge a free trade deal with Israel.

=== Sri Lanka ===
Israel was a source of weapons and training for the Sri Lanka Armed Forces during the war against Liberation Tigers of Tamil Eelam terrorist organization and weapons sold to the country, including IAI Kfir Fighter Jet, the Saar 4 class missile boats, Super Dvora Mk II-class patrol boat and the Gabriel missile. In May 2011, the Israeli Minister of Agriculture visited Sri Lanka with an agro-business delegation to promote cooperation between the two countries.

=== Thailand ===
Thailand and Israel have had full diplomatic relations since 23 June 1954. The Israeli embassy was opened in 1958 although the Thai embassy in Tel Aviv only opened in 1996. Since the beginning, both countries have enjoyed strong ties and beneficial bilateral cooperation in many fields, most notably in agriculture and education. Thousands of Thai academics have been sent to train in Israel while many Thai schools have been modeled after Israel's experience and know-how with aid from Mashav. State visits by Thai royalty to Israel have been reciprocated by Israel's public figures. 100,000 Israeli tourists visit Thailand annually. Thousands of skilled and unskilled Thai workers are employed in Israel and many Thai students study in Israel.

There is also a Thai-Israel Chamber of Commerce, Thai-Israel Friendship Foundation as well as a small community of Israelis living in Thailand.

=== Turkmenistan ===
In 2013, the Israel Foreign Ministry opened a new embassy in Ashgabat, Turkmenistan.

=== Vietnam ===
Vietnam and Israel established diplomatic relations on 12 July 1993. Israel opened its resident embassy in Hanoi in December 1993. The first Vietnamese ambassador to Israel presented his credentials on 8 July 2009. Since the establishment of diplomatic relations, the two countries have frequently conducted reciprocal visits at various levels, and have strengthened ties in such fields as business, education, culture, technological cooperation and agriculture. The visits arranged by the Israeli government included those of delegations comprising entrepreneurs and businessmen, academic groups, journalists, artists and musicians, legal workers, and so on.

== Europe ==
=== Albania ===
Israel and Albania established diplomatic relations on 20 August 1991. Albania had previously recognized Israel as a state since 1949. Albania has an embassy in Tel Aviv and Israel also has an embassy in Tirana.

=== Armenia ===
Since independence, Armenia has received support from Israel and today remains one of its major trade partners. Both countries established diplomatic relations on 4 April 1992. Israel maintains a consulate in Yerevan, while Armenia has an embassy in Tel-Aviv and an honorary consulate in Jerusalem. Israel has recognized 10 Armenians as Righteous Among the Nations for risking their lives to save Jews during the Holocaust.

=== Austria ===
Austria recognized Israel on 5 March 1949. Austria has an embassy in Tel Aviv and 3 honorary consulates (in Eilat, Haifa and Jerusalem). Israel has an embassy in Vienna. Both countries are full members of the Union for the Mediterranean. The Austrian Foreign Ministry lists the bilateral treaties with Israel.

=== Azerbaijan ===
Azerbaijani–Israeli relations are good, and Israel has an embassy in Baku. In May 1999, the U.S.-Azerbaijan Council sponsored a seminar to discuss relations among Azeris, Jews, and Israel. In April 2000, an Israeli trade delegation visited Baku to discuss ways of strengthening bilateral economic relations.

The Azerbaijan–Israel Friendship Society facilitates and promotes bilateral diplomatic and business links. In October 2001, President Aliyev pledged to open an embassy in Israel and send his Foreign Minister to visit the country. Although neither has occurred, Azerbaijani–Israeli strategic cooperation continues to grow.

For many years, Azerbaijan has maintained high rates of immigration to Israel due to the economic and political situation in the country. In 2002, 475 Jews made aliyah and 111 immigrated to the United States. The Azeri government gets regular updates from Israel regarding Azeri Jews in Israel, who are plagued by unemployment, crime, and other social issues as new immigrants in Israel.

=== Belarus ===
Israel established relations with Belarus in 1992 and continue to maintain friendly relations. In April 2000, Belarus and Israel signed an agreement on trade, science, culture, and education. The two countries also formed a joint committee to improve relations between the two nations. Belarus has an embassy in Tel Aviv and Israel has an embassy in Minsk. The two countries have also discussed implementing a visa-free regime between the two countries. Belarus Foreign Minister Vladimir Makei continues to satisfied with the relations between the two countries and also expressed hope for new opportunities to facilitate further all-round cooperation with Israel in conjunction with fostering progressive development with the Jewish state. Both nations celebrated its 20th anniversary in December 2012. Bilateral cooperation has since then encapsulated tourism, culture, trade, economy, science, education and other fields. In 2013, Belarusian Vice Premier Mikhail Rusyi met top Israeli officials from the Belarusian Agriculture and Food Ministry, the State Committee for Science and Technology, Belarusbank and the Vitebsk Oblast Executive Committee to further facilitate economic cooperation as well as development of innovative technologies into the Belarusian agricultural sector.

=== Bosnia and Herzegovina ===
Israel and Bosnia and Herzegovina established diplomatic relations in 1997.

=== Bulgaria ===
Israel and Bulgaria have strong ties. Bulgaria saved the majority of its Jews during World War II — 48,000 were rescued, 11,343 were deported. Israel and Bulgaria established diplomatic relations in 1948. After the Six-Day War Bulgaria cut diplomatic ties with Israel. In 1988, Bulgaria joined the wave of first nations to recognise the State of Palestine, something it has never withdrawn. In 1990 diplomatic relations were renewed. Bulgaria has an embassy in Tel Aviv and Israel has an embassy in Sofia and honorary consul in Varna.

In January 2012, Israel and Bulgaria signed two memorandum of understanding, one was for joint military training exercises and one for cooperation in the defence sector. The two agreements were signed by Israeli Defense Minister Ehud Barak and Bulgarian Defense Minister Anyu Angelov. Minister Angelov said the two agreements, in addition to their economic and defense benefits, also "bring a political message – Bulgaria and Israel are a step closer towards stronger cooperation and a strategic dialogue." After the 2012 Burga bus bombing, Bulgaria and Israel pledged to increase security relations between the two countries discussing various aspects of bilateral cooperation at a meeting at the Ministry of Interior between Bulgarian Deputy Prime Minister and Minister of Interior Tsvetlin Iochev and Israeli Foreign Affairs Minister, Avigdor Leiberman in November 2013. An international investigation led by Bulgaria has established was the work of people linked with the bombing to the military wing of Hezbollah where five Israeli tourists and a Bulgarian citizen died.

The governments of both countries also intend to cooperate in the high-tech sector, the communications sector, health care and agriculture and to continue the positive development of tourism between the two countries and energy resource divestment. Israel also intends to join with Bulgaria, Cyprus, Greece and Romania to launch a regional group for crisis response which will boost the partnership between these countries in cases of common security challenges as result of a March 2014 meeting between Avigdor Lieberman and Bulgarian Interior Minister Tsvetlin Yovchev.

=== Croatia ===
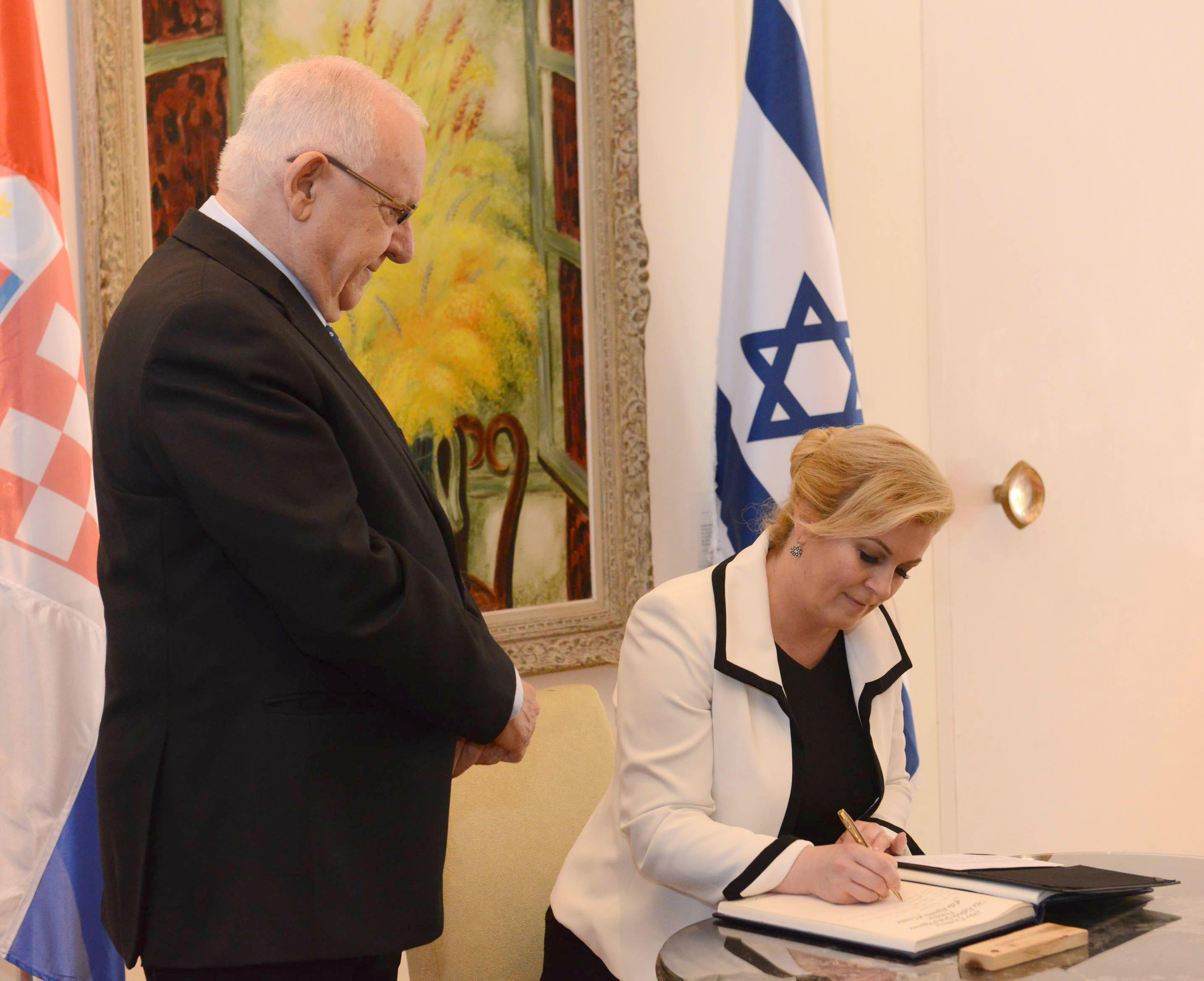
Croatian president Kolinda Grabar-Kitarović with Israeli president Reuven Rivlin, July 2015

While Croatia was part of the Yugoslavia Federation (1943–1991) it established diplomatic relations with Israel in year 1948 through the Federation, but after Israel attacked Yugoslavia's Non-Aligned Movement ally Egypt in the Six-Day War in 1967, Yugoslavia severed all diplomatic relations with Israel. After the breakup of Yugoslavia occurred as a result of a series of political upheavals and conflicts Croatia declared independence on 8 October 1991 and officially renewed its bilateral relations with Israel which recognized Croatia as an independent state on 16 April 1992, but due to some disagreements with the Croatian President Tuđman full diplomatic relations were established 5 years later, on 4 September 1997. Since then relations between Croatia and Israel have been excellent. Croatia has an embassy in Tel Aviv and 4 honorary consulates (in Ashdod, Caesarea, Jerusalem and Kfar Shmaryahu). Israel has an embassy in Zagreb. In addition, Croatia does not recognize the State of Palestine.

=== Cyprus ===
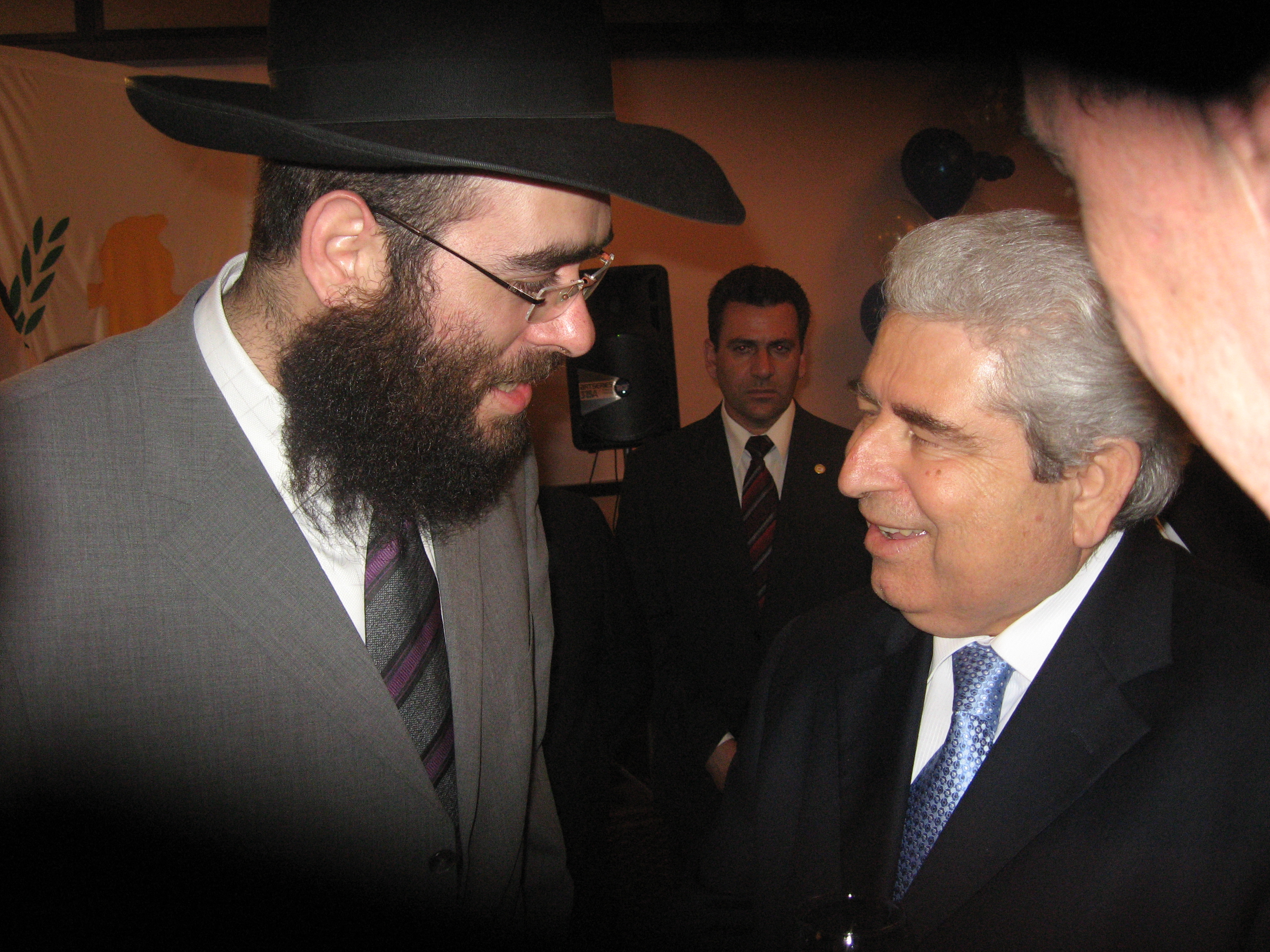
Chief Rabbi of Cyprus, Arie Zeev Raskin, meets the Cypriot President, Demetris Christofias.

Israel has had diplomatic relations with Cyprus since Israel's independence in 1948, when Cyprus was a British protectorate. Israel and Cyprus' associations have continued to expand since 1960, the year of Cyprus' independence. The neighboring countries trade regularly and there are high flows of tourism between them. However, Cypriot politicians have frequently spoken out against Israeli military raids in the Palestinian territories as well as the 2006 Lebanon War, during which Cyprus was forced to manage a heavy flow of refugees and aid out of and into Lebanon.

However, the discovery of natural gas in the Leviathan gas field led to a thawing of relations between the two governments. The two countries demarcated their Exclusive Economic Zones in 2010. Israel's rising antagonism with Turkey further increased the level of cooperation between the two countries, as Israel compensated by improving its relations elsewhere. In February 2012, Netanyahu visited Cyprus, the first visit of an Israeli Prime Minister in history.

Relations between Israel and Cyprus are based on mutual respect for Western values, the support for free-market economy and the establishment of democracies in the Middle East that would co-exist peacefully.

=== Czech Republic ===
Israel and the Czech Republic share a special relationship. Czechoslovakia was the only country to send aid to Israel in its early years e.g. arms shipments from Czechoslovakia to Israel 1947–1949.

In December 2008, the Czech Air Force wanted to train in desert conditions for the upcoming mission in Afghanistan. No country agreed to help, except Israel. Israel saw it as an opportunity to thank the Czechs for training Israeli pilots when the country was first established.

=== Denmark ===
The relations between Denmark and Israel have been friendly and warm. Denmark voted for the partition of Palestine in 1947 and supports Israel in the United Nations. Denmark was one of few countries in Europe to save most of its Jewish population during the WWII. In Jerusalem, there is a monument to the rescue of Danish Jews, a school is named in Denmark's honor, and the King Christian X hospital in Eitanim is named after Denmark's king during World War II. Denmark has an embassy in Israel, and Israel has an embassy in Copenhagen.

The political lives of the two states have been somewhat intertwined: The former Israeli minister of social and diaspora affairs Michael Melchior was born in Denmark and is the son of former chief rabbi in Copenhagen, Bent Melchior, the nephew of former Danish minister of traffic and minister of tourism and communication Arne Melchior, and the grandson of the acting rabbi for the Jewish refugees from Denmark in Sweden 1943–45, Marcus Melchior; the executive director of the Peres Center for Peace 2001–2011, Ron Pundak who played an important role in starting the Oslo peace process and was part of the core group behind the Geneva Initiative, is the son of the influential Danish journalist Herbert Pundik; and the prominent Israeli politician Yohanan Plesner, former chairman of the Plesner Committee, is the son of Danish architect Ulrik Plesner.

=== Estonia ===
Estonia and Israel maintain excellent relations. Israel officially recognized the Republic of Estonia on 4 September 1991 and diplomatic relations were established on 9 January 1992. Foreign Minister Urmas Paet opened the Estonian Embassy in Tel Aviv in November 2009.

As of 2012, bilateral trade with Israel was 19.9 million euros.

=== Finland ===
In 2004, a joint Finland-Israel Technology (FIT) cooperation program was created for research and development projects in the field of ICT. The Office of the Chief Scientist in Israel and Tekes, the Finnish Funding Agency for Research and Innovation, allocated five million euros each for the funding of projects. In 2005, Finnish exports to Israel totaled 155,24 million euros and imports from Israel to Finland totaled 95.96 million euros. Finland's leading exports to Israel are telecommunications equipment and machinery, and Israeli fruits and vegetables.

=== France ===
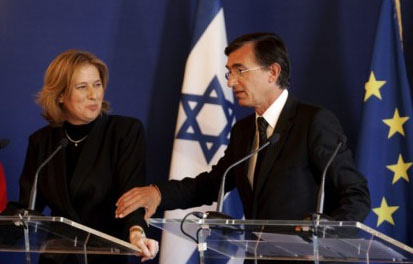
Tzipi Livni and French foreign minister Douste-Blazy

In the early 1950s, France and Israel maintained close political and military ties as common enemies of Pan-Arab nationalism. France was Israel's main weapons supplier until its withdrawal from Algeria in 1962 removed most common interest from the relationship, and France became increasingly critical of Israel. This new reality became clear when, in the crisis leading up to the Six-Day War in June 1967, Charles de Gaulle's government imposed an arms embargo on the region, mostly affecting Israel, which had relied on France for weapons over the previous decade. Under François Mitterrand in the early 1980s, French–Israeli relations improved greatly. Mitterrand was the first French president to visit Israel while in office. In 1967, after the Six-Day War, 5,300 French Jews immigrated to Israel.

=== Georgia ===
Relations between Israel and Georgia remain excellent. Georgia's former defense minister from 2006 to 2008, Davit Kezerashvili, had previously lived in Israel. Israel has been selling weapons to Georgia for seven years financed by grants from the USA Included in these weapons are Israeli-built spy drones provided through the former mayor of Tel Aviv, Roni Milo. Israeli advisors, estimated to number between 100 and 1,000, have trained the Georgian military for some time. The two nations also maintain a visa free policy where Georgian and Israeli officials signed an agreement to lift visa requirements for Georgian citizens traveling to Israel, reciprocating Georgia's visa-free policy for Israelis in place since mid-2005.

Georgia has its embassy in Tel Aviv, and the State of Israel has its embassy in Tbilisi. In June 2013, Georgian Prime Minister Bidzina Ivanishvili praised the Jewish people and Israel and has sought to increase relations between Israel and Georgia elucidating his special relationship between him, Georgia and the Jewish people. Ivanishvili also wanted to extend strategic partnerships and as well as furthering economic cooperation by making it easier for Israeli entrepreneurs and investors to not just do business in Israel, but also facilitate the right paths to do business for the Georgians. The Israel-Georgia Chamber of Business was established in 1996 in order to facilitate business transactions between the two friendly countries and acting as a guide for Israeli businesses through the Georgian economy. Major sectors include insurance, real estate and construction, medical and dental solutions, industrial and utility projects, and energy.

=== Germany ===
Due to its role in the Holocaust, Israel was at first extremely hostile towards Germany and initially refused to establish relations with them. However, relations gradually thawed as Germany offered to pay reparations in 1952, and diplomatic relations were officially established in 1965. Israel and Germany now maintain a "special relationship" based on shared beliefs, Western values and a combination of historical perspectives. Among the most important factors in their relations is Nazi Germany's role in the genocide of 6 million Jews during the Holocaust.

Germany is a prime supplier of arms to Israel, including Dolphin submarines. The military co-operation has been discreet but mutually profitable: Israeli intelligence, for example, sent captured Warsaw Pact armor to West Germany to be analyzed. The results aided the German development of an anti-tank system.

=== Greece ===
Both Greece and Turkey recognized the State of Israel in the late 1940s, but were diplomatically represented in Tel Aviv on lower-than-embassy levels. Greek–Israeli relations improved in 1995.

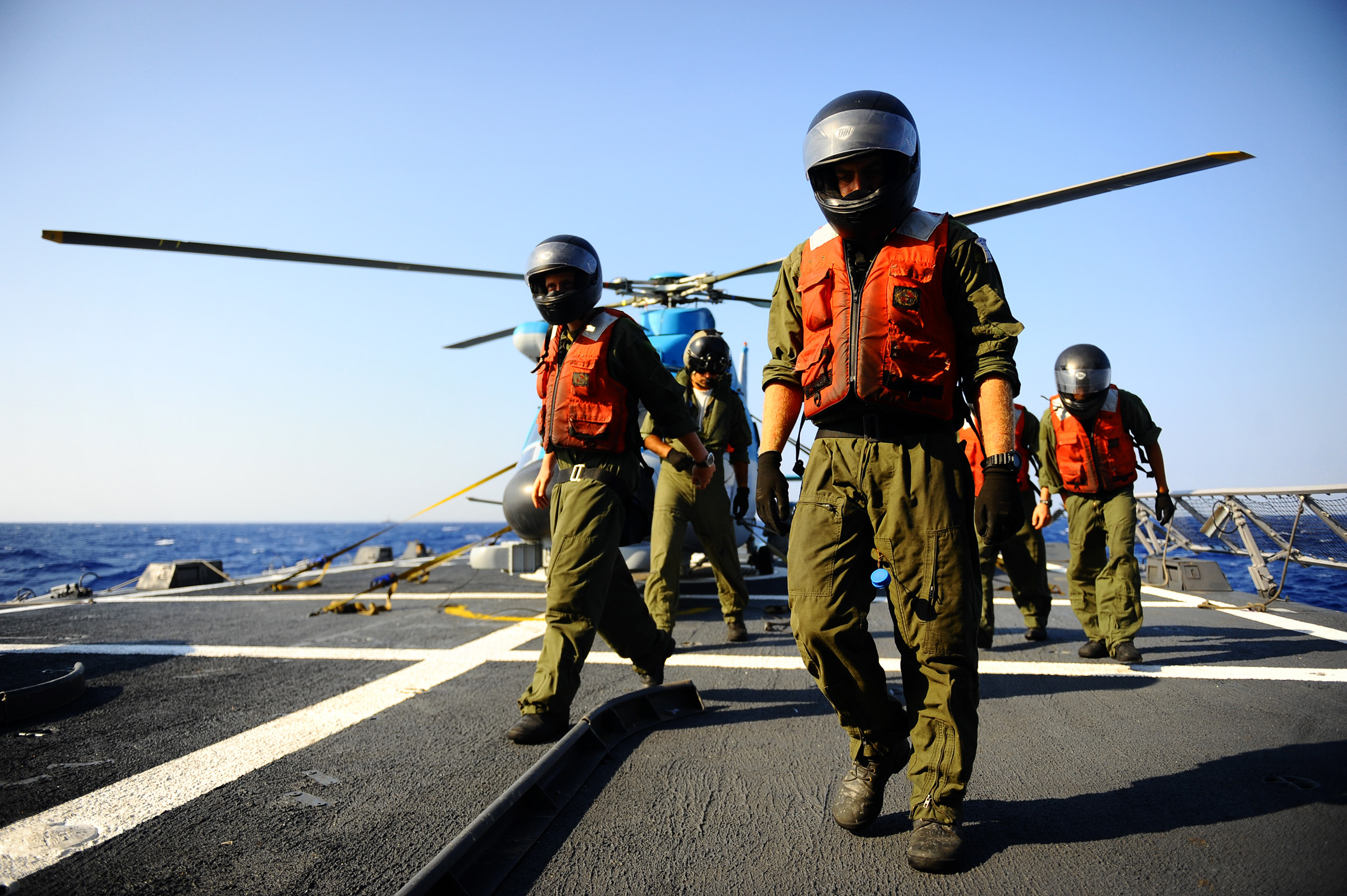
The Israeli and Greek Navies joined forces in 2012 near Piraeus.

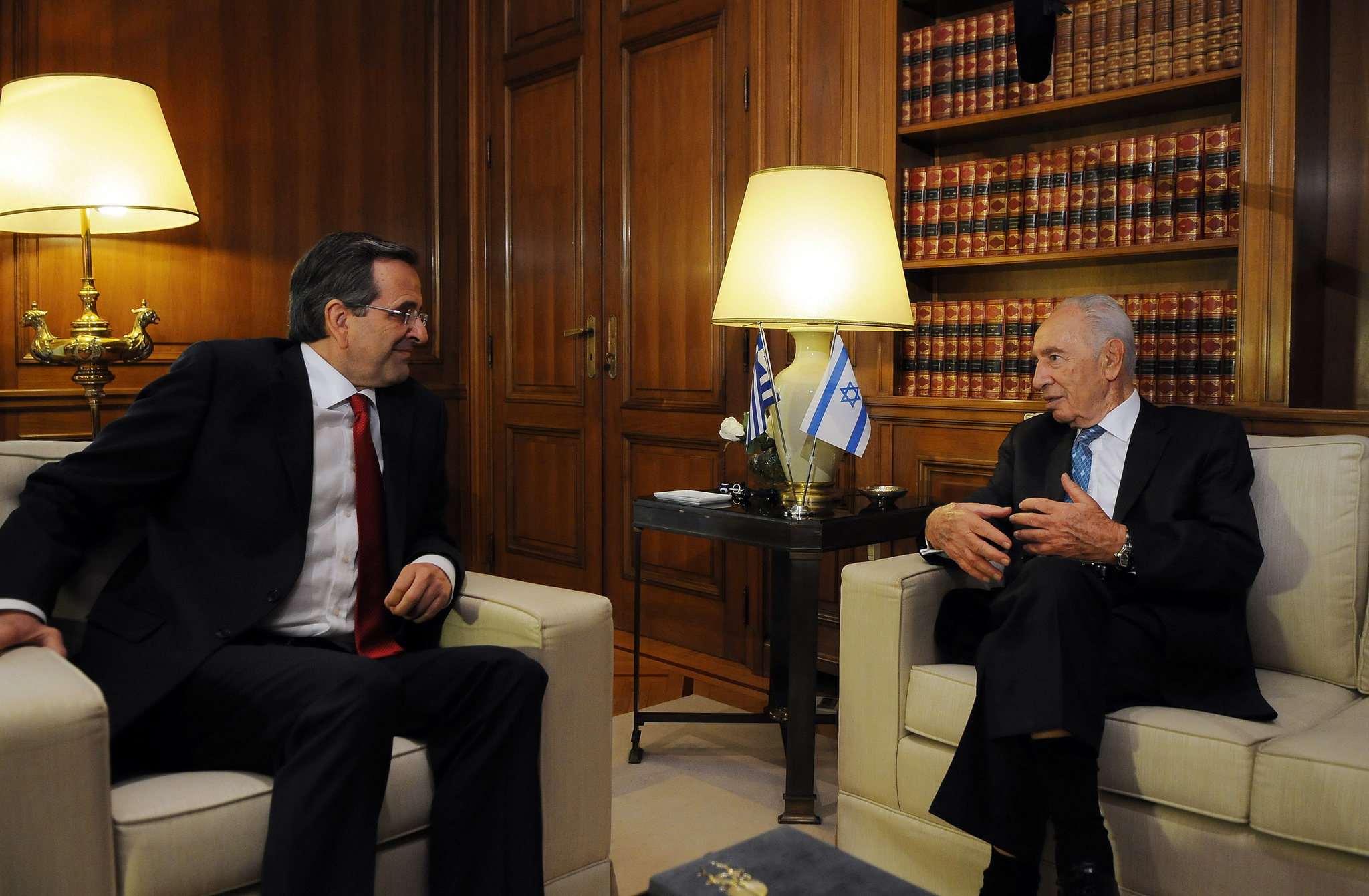
Meeting of President of Israel Shimon Peres and Prime Minister of Greece Antonis Samaras in August 2012 in Athens

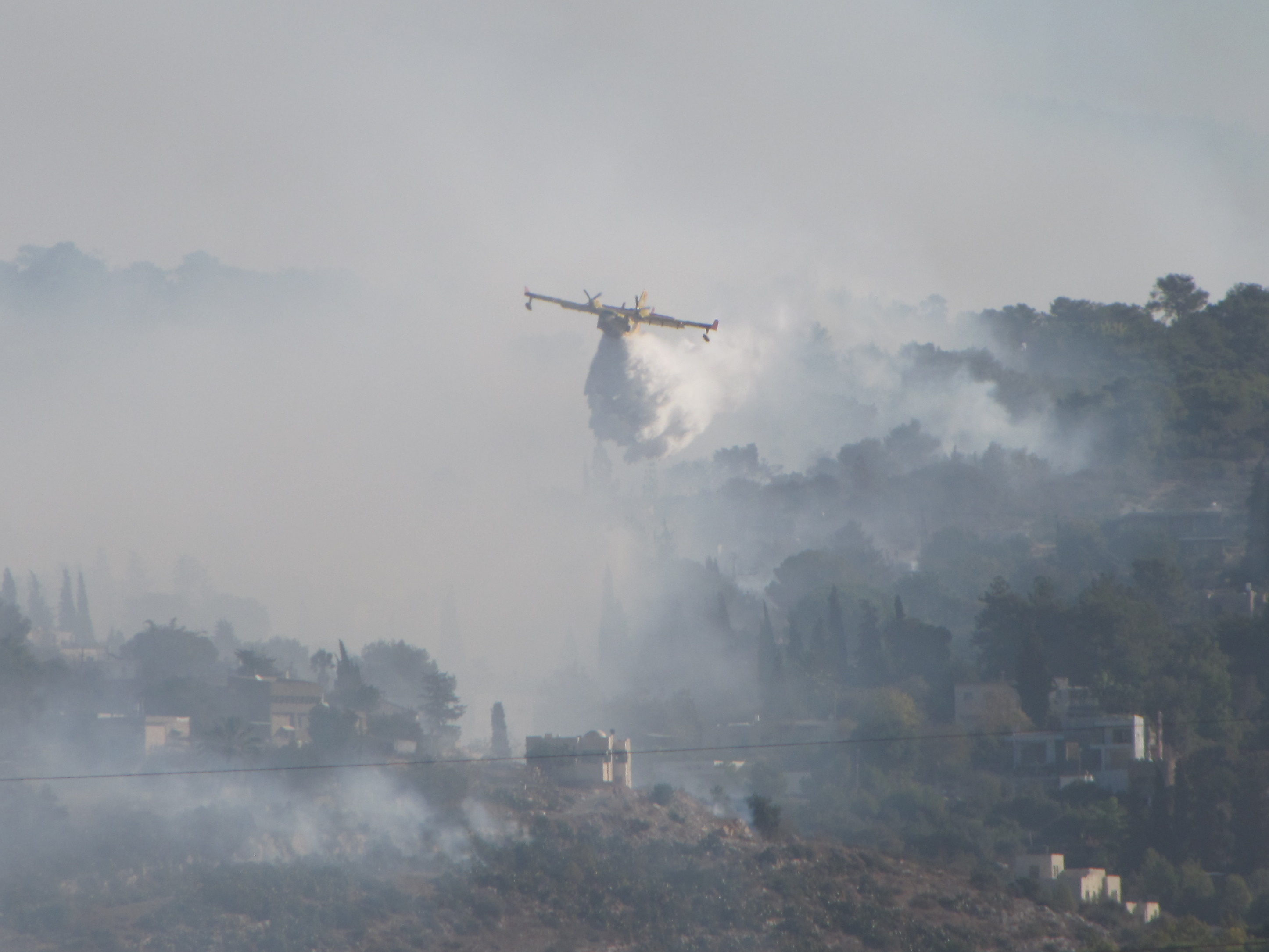
Hellenic Air Force Bombardier 415s fighting flames at Ein Hod on 4 December 2010

Greece–Israel relations improved as Turkey–Israel relations worsened in the aftermath of the 2010 Gaza flotilla raid. In October 2010, the Israeli and Greek air-forces trained jointly in Greece. According to the BBC, this signified a boost in ties that was due in large part to Israel's rift with Turkey. In November 2011, the Israeli Air Force hosted Greece's Hellenic Air Force in a joint exercise at the Uvda base.

The joint Cyprus–Israel oil and gas explorations are also an important factor for Greece, given its strong links with Cyprus. Additionally Greek and Israeli state controlled energy companies are planning to lay the world's longest subsea power cable, linking Israel, Cyprus and Greece by 2023. The link, called the EuroAsia Interconnector project, will be the longest in the world.

A new joint action committee for the Greek–Israeli alliance has been created in the U.S. Congress in early 2013. The creation and goals of the Greek-Israeli Caucus under the name Congressional Hellenic-Israel Alliance were announced at a special event held in the Congress. It is co-chaired by Congress members Gus Bilirakis the Republican representative from Florida and Ted Deutch the Democrat from Florida, and the Greek-Israeli Caucus consists of powerful members of both Republican and Democratic party. It is estimated that it may become the most important pressure group in Congress by 2014.

=== Holy See ===
Before the establishment of the State of Israel in 1948, the Vatican opposed Zionist policies and objectives in Palestine. In 1947, during discussions at the United Nations about the United Nations Partition Plan for Palestine, the Vatican supported the internationalization of Jerusalem, in order to keep the holy places away from either Israeli or Arab sovereignty. In October 1948, as the 1948 Arab–Israeli War was in progress, Pope Pius XII, deeply disturbed by that violent conflict, issued the encyclical In multiplicibus curis, in which he called on the peace-makers to give Jerusalem and its outskirts "an international character" and to assure – "with international guarantees" – freedom of access and worship at the holy places scattered throughout Palestine. In April 1949, he issued the encyclical Redemptoris nostri cruciatus, in which he appealed for justice for the Palestinian refugees and repeated his call for an "international status" as the best form of protection for the holy places.

In January 1964, Pope Paul VI visited Israel, the first such Papal visit.

Following the Six-Day War, the Vatican modified its position on the holy places. In an address to the College of Cardinals in December 1967, Pope Paul VI called for a "special statute, internationally guaranteed" for Jerusalem and the Holy Places, thus changing the previous demand for the internationalization of Jerusalem.

Diplomatic relations between the Israeli government and the Vatican were established in 1994, following the conclusion of the Fundamental Agreement between the Holy See and the State of Israel, signed on 30 December 1993. The Holy See (the Vatican), which has UN observer status, is the only non-UN member state with which Israel has diplomatic relations and the only non-UN member state recognised by Israel. An important organ in these relations is the Israel-Vatican Bilateral Commission, established under article 10 of the Agreement to resolve economic issues between the parties.

In 2000, Pope John Paul II visited Israel, followed by visits of Pope Benedict XVI (2009) and Pope Francis (2014). The bilateral commission convened on 30 April 2009 and 10 December 2009.

=== Hungary ===
Hungary and Israel established full diplomatic relations in 1948 and severed during the Six-Day War in 1967. Relations were restored in 1989 with improved relations as well as the opening of embassies and consulates with Hungary having an embassy in Tel Aviv and 4 honorary consulates (in Eilat, Haifa, Jerusalem and Tel Aviv) and Israel has an embassy in Budapest and an honorary consulate in Szeged. Both countries have stressed the increasing of trade and tourism between one another and an estimated 30,000 Hungarian Jews emigrated to Israel in 1948. Both nations are also members of the Union for the Mediterranean.

In January 2022, Israeli Prime Minister Naftali Bennett thanked his Hungarian counterpart, Prime Minister Viktor Orbán, for the Hungarian government's consistent support of Israel at international forums.

=== Ireland ===
Full diplomatic relations between Ireland and Israel were established in 1975. As of 2023, the Israeli ambassador to Ireland is Dana Erlich and the Irish ambassador to Israel is Sonya McGuinness.

The Irish government followed a similar line to other EU governments during the 2006 Lebanon War, with the Irish Taoiseach, Bertie Ahern, condemning the actions of Israel as "reckless and disproportionate" and calling for an immediate ceasefire on both sides, while also condemning the actions of Hezbollah. During the conflict, a shipment of bombs that attempted to land in Ireland from USA to Tel Aviv was denied use of Irish airspace and airfields by the Irish Government. The weapons were part of a series of agreed arms shipments between the United States Government and Israel. The shipments were diverted via Scotland, where they also caused controversy.

In 2010, the Israel Defense Forces forcibly boarded an Irish aid ship destined for the Gaza Strip which resulted in worsened relations, Israel's Mossad was also involved in the counterfeiting of Irish passports, and two members of the Israeli ambassador's security staff in Dublin were subsequently deported. In 2010, there were numerous protests at the Israeli embassy in Ireland over the treatment of Palestinians.

In December 2024, Israel announced that it would close its embassy in Dublin due to what it described as "the extreme anti-Israel policies of the Irish government".

=== Italy ===
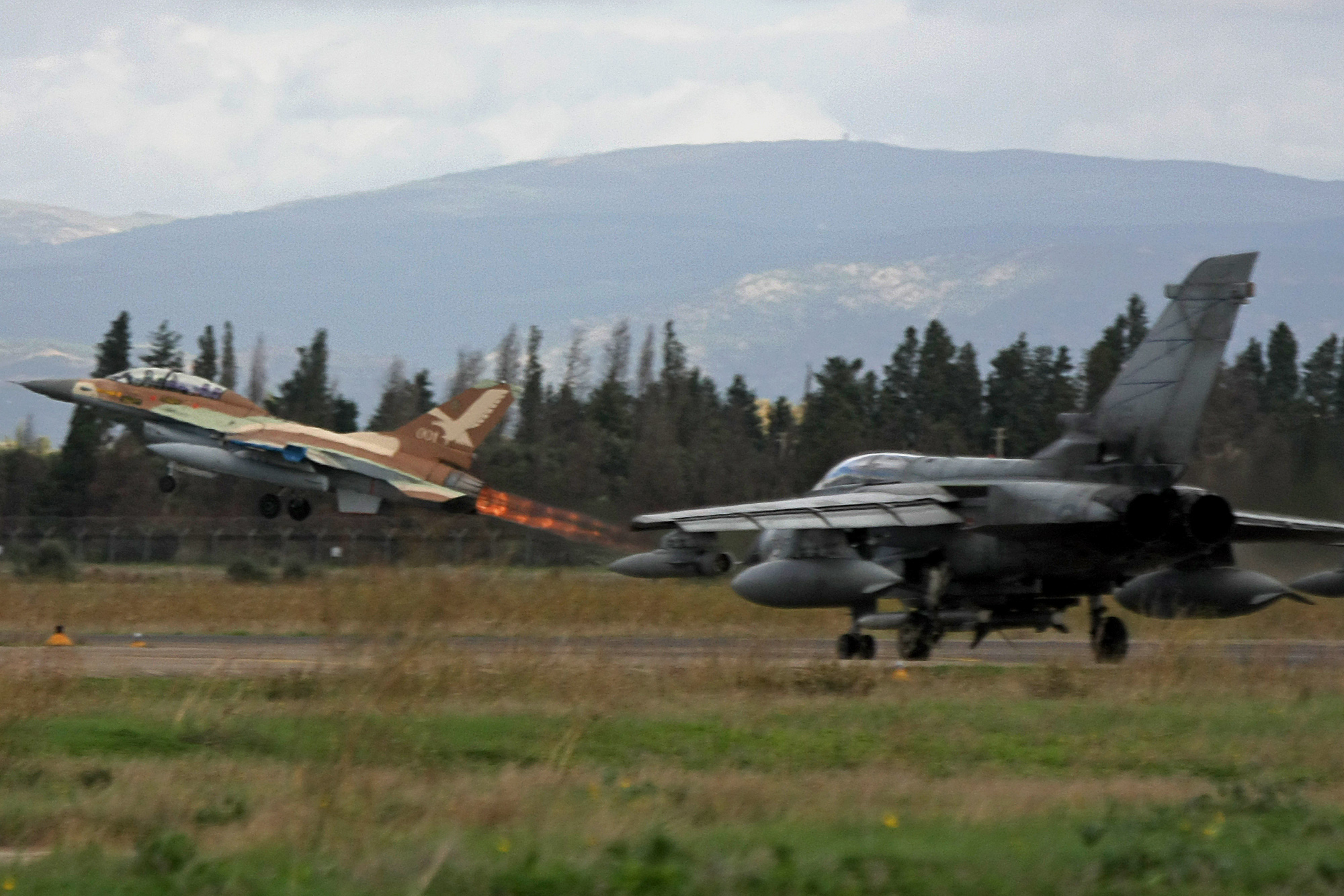
The Israeli and Italian Air Forces conclude an extensive, two-week joint exercise in Sardinia, 17 November 2010.

Relations between Italy and Israel remain strong, with frequent diplomatic exchanges and a large volume of trade. The Israeli Government has followed with great attention the fight against international terrorism pursued by the Italian Government.

=== Kosovo ===
On 17 February 2008, Kosovo declared its independence from Serbia, a move Serbia rejects. Kosovo has been recognized by a substantial number of UN members, including the United States and most members of the European Union. At the time of the declaration, an Israeli Foreign Ministry official stated: "We haven't decided when we're going to decide, and instead will monitor events and consider the issue." Israel was reluctant to recognize Kosovo's independence, in part because of the possibility of Palestinians using recognition of Kosovo to justify their own unilateral declaration of independence. On 21 September 2018 the president of Kosovo, Hashim Thaci told that he would place the Kosovo embassy in Jerusalem if Israel recognized Kosovo as an independent state. Israel and Kosovo agreed to establish diplomatic relations on 4 September 2020. In March 2022, Kosovo officially opened its embassy in Jerusalem after becoming the first Muslim-majority territory to recognise Jerusalem as Israel's capital.

=== Latvia ===
Latvia and Israel established diplomatic relations 6 January 1992. In October 2012, Foreign Minister Edgars Rinkēvičs called on Israeli officials for the development of economic and trade contacts between both countries and support for Latvia's accession to the Organisation for Economic Co-operation and Development (OECD). Rinkevics also met with Israeli President Shimon Peres on behalf of President Berzins to visit Latvia. Rinkevics and Peres agreed on the key significance of education and knowledge-based economies for the development of small countries further paving opportunities for our future cooperation between the two nations.

Israeli Foreign Minister Avigdor Lieberman also corroborated claims that Israel is interested in forging closer relations with Latvia as Rinkevics emphasized the 20th anniversary of relations between Latvia and Israel in 2012 and both foreign ministers expressed their commitment to strengthening economic and trade cooperation, including contacts between Latvian and Israeli entrepreneurs and a more cooperative operation in the fields of education, culture and science.

=== Lithuania ===
Israel recognized Lithuania's independence in 1991. Both countries established diplomatic relation in 1992. Israel has an embassy in Vilnius. Lithuania has an embassy in Tel Aviv and two honorary consulates (in Herzliya and Ramat Gan). Relations are warm and friendly between the two nations and both bi-national trade and tourism has doubled, and two new regularly scheduled flights have just been set between the two countries since 2010.

Lithuanian achievements, particularly Lithuania's achievements in biochemistry and the biosciences have attracted Israeli entrepreneurs and investors to invest in Lithuania's science and technology sector and Lithuania is enthusiastic in combining Israel's knack for unlocked untapped entrepreneurial and intellectual potential combined with Lithuania's strong science and technology research base and talented workforce. Both nations have concluded an agreement on cooperation in industrial research and experimental development as further cooperation within venture capital to fund joint research projects remains underway.

Bilateral meetings between both nations reached unexpected highs between 2009–2011 and cooperations between the two nations remain excellent with several forms of cooperation that include science, economics, education, and culture as emphasized by Lithuanian Foreign Minister Audronius Azubalis. Lithuanian President Dalia Grybauskaite has stated Israel as model of innovation in which is one of the reasons that Lithuania is interested in enhancing its bilateral relations.

In 2011 alone, Israeli tourism to Lithuania grew by 62 percent, and Lithuanian exports to Israel increased by 54 percent. Israel's leading pharmaceutical company, Teva Pharmaceutical Industries Ltd, has a manufacturing plant in Lithuania and TEVA recently invested in "Sicor Biotech", a Lithuanian biotechnological pharmaceutical company, further signifying economic cooperation and encourages the development of such sciences as biotechnology and genetic engineering in Lithuanian universities.

Israeli companies have taken a very active interest in possibilities for carrying out clinical research in Lithuania; many of them are already in cooperation with Lithuanian medical institutions and have invested in Lithuania's burgeoning life sciences sector. In 2013, Lithuanian biotechnology company ProBioSanus signed a representation agreement with Bharat Israel where ProBioSanus' natural, probiotic-based cleaning and personal care products will be available for sale in Israel for the first time. The company already opened stores in Lithuania and Scandinavia. Mr Andrejauskas, head of ProBioSanus spoke of this agreement saying that "We have a strong scientific base and intellectual potential in Lithuania, so we are allocating particular attention to the creation of new formulas and products." Besides Israeli investments in the Lithuanian life science's sector, Lithuanian presence in Israel in the food industry remains strong as Israeli supermarkets sell Lithuanian cheese, curd desserts, Vilnius mayonnaise, Žemaitijos Pienas butter, Panevėžys ice cream, Švyturys-Utenos Alus beers and various styles of Lithuanian liquors. According to Vadimas Ivanovas, a business and financial analyst at Enterprise Lithuania, says that Israeli retail chains are very interested in Lithuanian sweets, pastries, canned vegetables, various sauces, alcoholic beverages, mineral water. "Veal is particularly popular."

=== Luxembourg ===
In November 1947, Luxembourg voted in favor of the partition plan to create a Jewish state. Israel and Luxembourg established full diplomatic relations in 1949. Due to Luxembourg's small size, the Israeli embassy is located in Brussels and Luxembourg is represented politically by the Dutch embassy and economically by the Belgian embassy.

=== Moldova ===
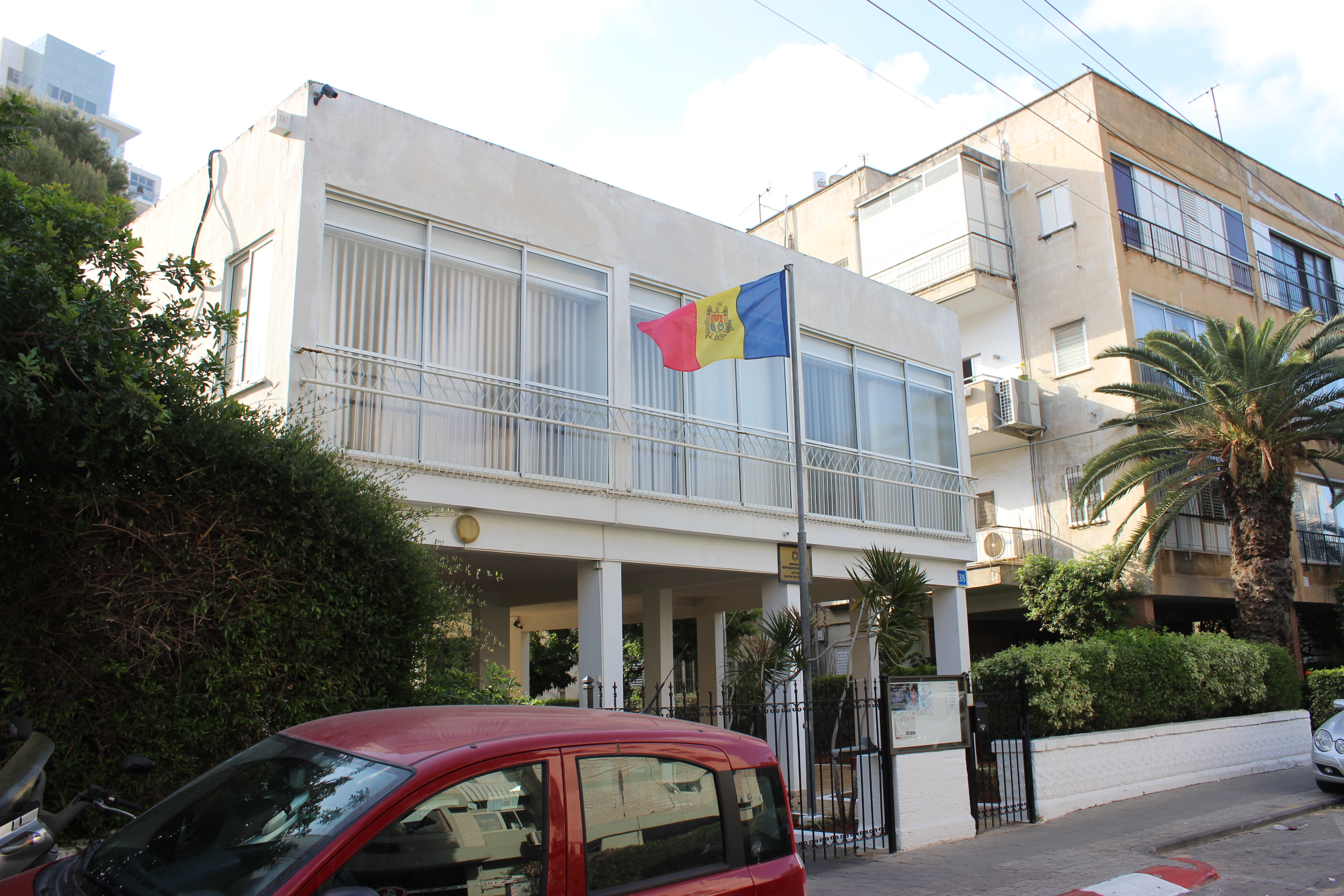
Moldovan Embassy in Tel Aviv

Relations between Moldova and Israel were established on 6 June 1992. Israel recognized Moldova on 25 December 1991. Israel is represented in Moldova through its embassy in Chisinau and Moldova has an embassy in Tel Aviv and an honorary consulate in Haifa. Relations between the two countries are friendly and a warm one based on mutual support. A myriad of efforts are primarily focused on the realization of achieved accords on cooperation in the fields of economy, medicine, industry, agriculture, social and cultural issues. Though the volume of trade between Israel and Moldova was low, Larisa Miculet, the third Ambassador of Moldova to Israel, has stated that there numerous untapped potential of increasing bilateral trade. For Israeli entrepreneurs and investors, Moldova is geopolitically convenient because of its location in the center of Europe, its high transparency between public authorities and foreign investors and due to its having eliminated most of the bureaucratic barriers that hinder business activities. Various business sectors of cooperation between Israel and Moldova range from pharmaceuticals, energy, information technology and software, electronics and electronic equipment, power engineering, metal and plastics processing and construction materials but Moldova has stressed foreign Israeli investments in all segments of the Moldovan economy.

=== Netherlands ===
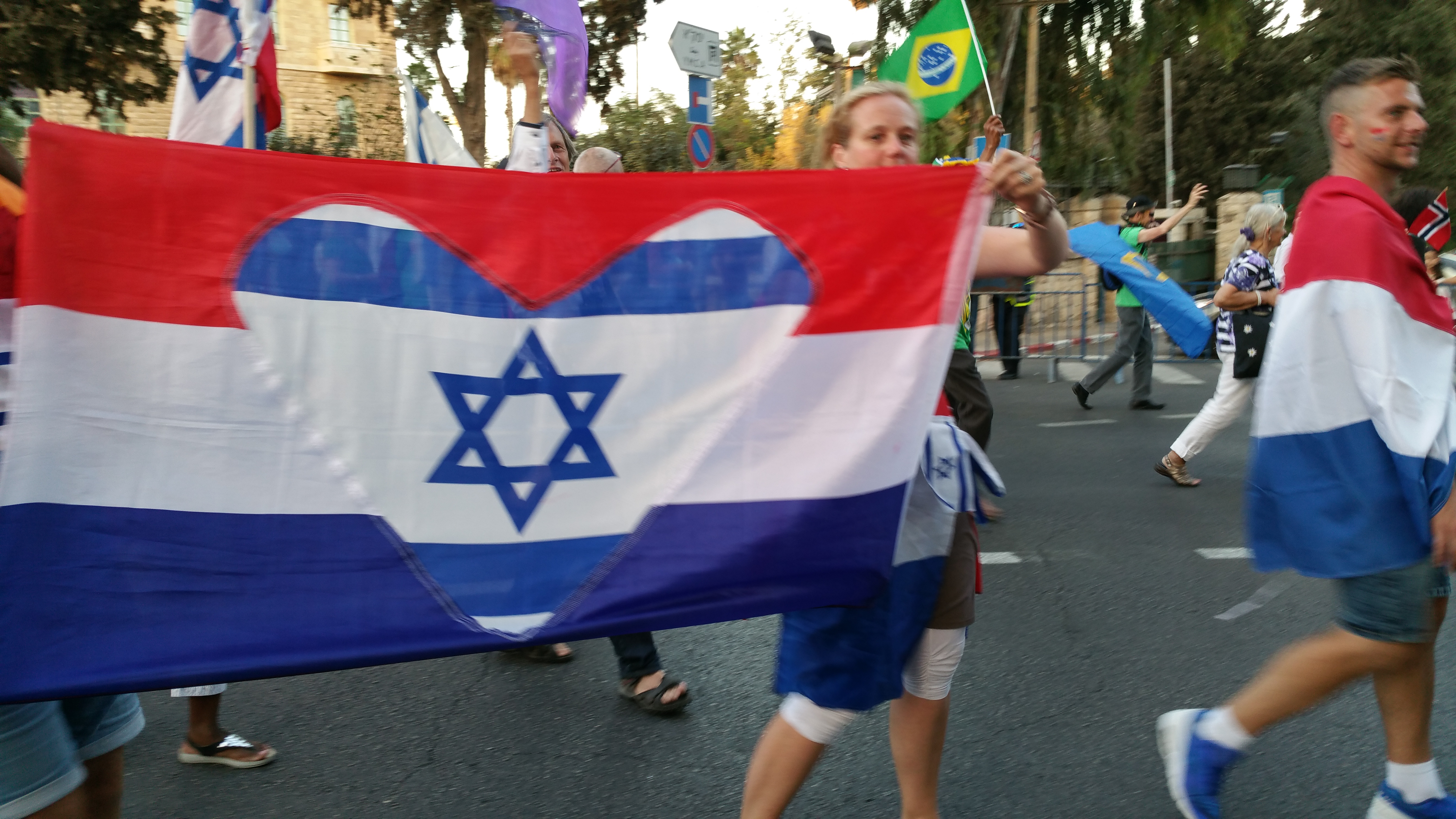
Netherlands delegation, Jerusalem March

In 1947, the Netherlands voted in favor of the establishing Israel and established diplomatic relation in 1949. Israel has an embassy in The Hague and The Netherlands has an embassy in Tel Aviv.

=== Norway ===
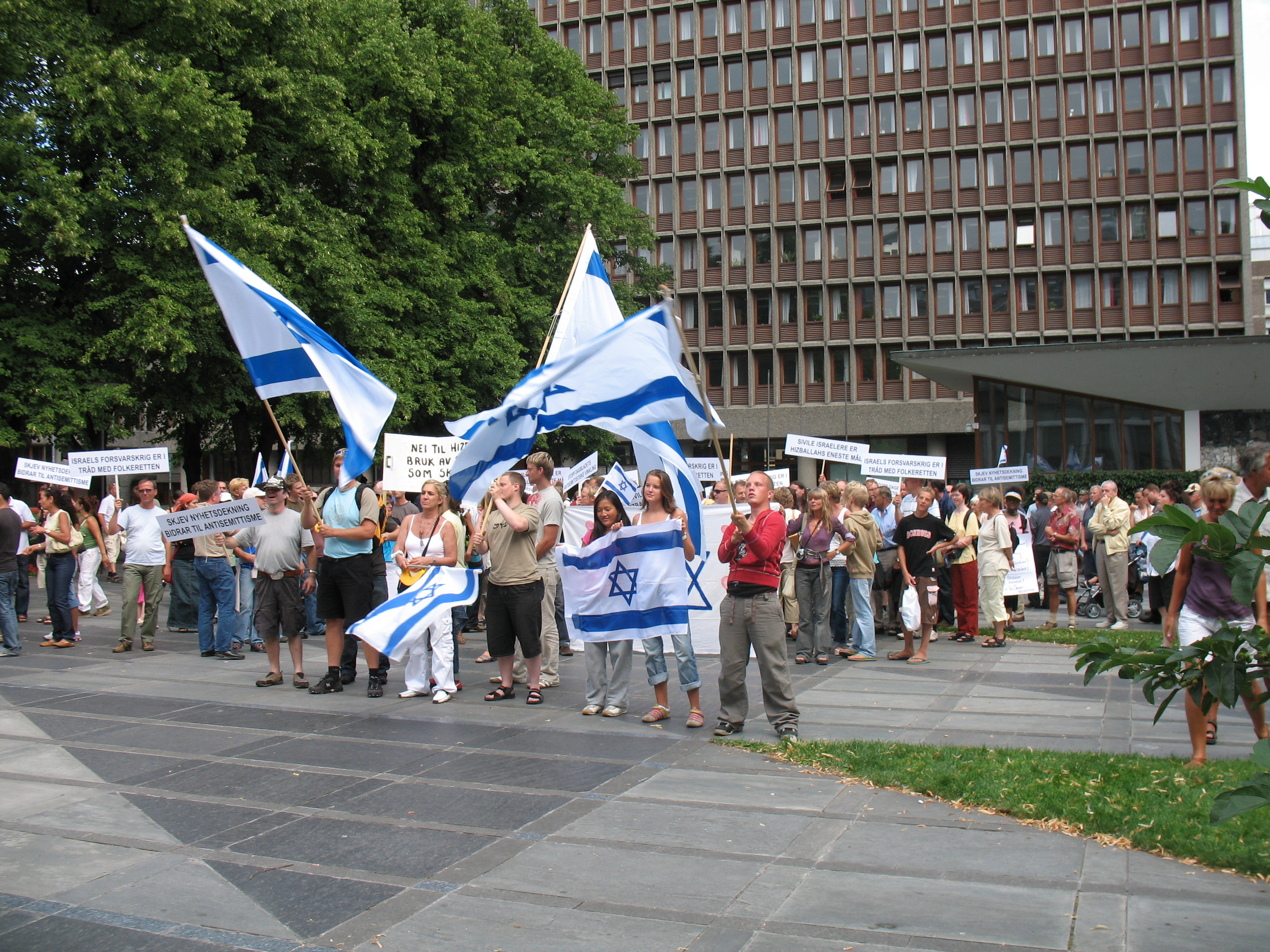
With Israel for Peace (MIFF), Oslo

Norway was one of the first countries to recognize Israel on 4 February 1949. Both countries established diplomatic relations later that year. Israel has an embassy which serves Norway and Iceland in Oslo. Norway has an embassy in Tel Aviv and 2 honorary consulates (in Eilat and Haifa). Israels Venner på Stortinget (Friends of Israel in the Parliament of Norway) is a pro-Israel caucus group consisting of members of the Parliament of Norway (Stortinget).

=== Poland ===
Following the severing of relations after the Six-Day War, Poland was the first Eastern Bloc country to restore relations with Israel in 1986 (beside Romania, which had continuous relations with Israel). Full diplomatic relations were reestablished in 1990, after the fall of Communism in Poland.

=== Portugal ===
The Estado Novo regime did not recognize Israel. Full diplomatic relations with the Portuguese government were established on 12 May 1977, following the Portuguese revolution of 1974.

=== Romania ===
Romania and Israel established full diplomatic relations on 11 June 1948. Between 1967 and 1989, Romania was the only Eastern Bloc country to maintain relations with Israel, after the Six-Day War.

Israel has an embassy in Bucharest. Romania has an embassy in Tel Aviv and 3 honorary consulates (in Haifa, Jerusalem and Tel Aviv). The two countries have signed many bilateral treaties and agreements and both of them are full members of the Union for the Mediterranean and many other international organizations.

=== Russia and the Soviet Union ===
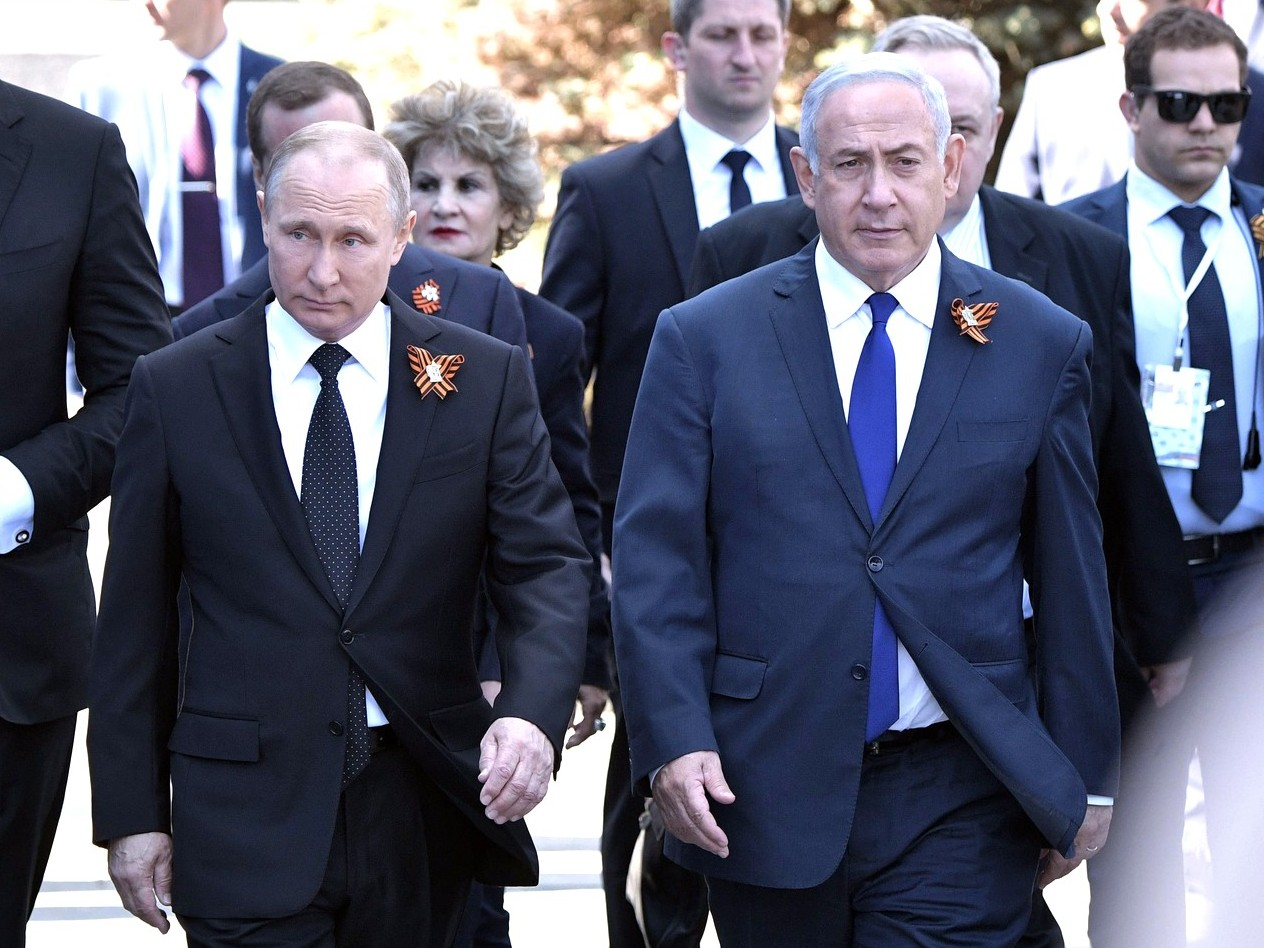
Benjamin Netanyahu and Vladimir Putin at the 2018 Moscow Victory Day Parade

The Soviet Union voted in favor of the United Nations Partition Plan for Palestine in 1947, which paved the way for the creation of the State of Israel. On 17 May 1948, on the third day of Israel's independence, the Soviet Union granted de jure recognition to the State of Israel, becoming only the second country to recognise Israel (preceded only by the United States' de facto recognition) and the first country to grant Israel de jure recognition.

The Soviet Union and the other communist states of Eastern Europe (with the exception of Romania) cut diplomatic ties with Israel during the Six-Day War. Relations were restored on 19 October 1991, a few months before the dissolution of the Soviet Union, despite the fact that hostile Arab countries such as Syria also maintain close ties with Russia. Russia is known to supply Syria with weapons.

In September 2010, Israel and Russia signed a comprehensive military agreement that will "increase cooperation on combating terrorism" and the proliferation of nuclear weapons. Israeli Defense Minister Ehud Barak met with his Russian counterpart, Anatoly Serdyukov and Prime Minister Vladimir Putin, and signed the agreement during a ceremony in Moscow. The Russian military plans on purchasing additional Israeli unmanned aerial vehicles. Russia previously bought 12 drones from the Israel Aerospace Industries following the war in South Ossetia.

=== Serbia ===
Diplomatic relations between Israel and Serbia's predecessor state, Yugoslavia, were severed for twenty-four years, from 1967 until 1991, when they were officially renewed, by which time Yugoslavia was in the process of disintegration. Diplomatic relations continued when, in April 1992, the two remaining Yugoslav republics, Serbia and Montenegro, formed the Federal Republic of Yugoslavia (renamed to Serbia and Montenegro in February 2003). On 3 June 2006, Montenegro and Serbia dissolved the union.

=== Slovakia ===
Both countries established diplomatic relations in 1993. Israel has an embassy in Bratislava, with its first resident ambassador in Slovakia being Yael Rubinstein. Slovakia has an embassy in Tel Aviv. In May 2008, Slovak Prime Minister Robert Fico called Ehud Olmert and Shimon Peres for the strengthening of diplomatic relations between Israel and Slovakia. An Israel – Slovakia Chamber of Commerce and Industry also exists to facilitate further economic and business cooperation between the two countries.

=== Slovenia ===
Israel and Slovenia established full diplomatic relations when Israel officially recognized Slovenia on 16 April 1992 and on 28 April 1992 when the countries signed the Protocol establishing diplomatic relations between each other. The Slovenian-Israeli Chamber of Commerce was established in 2010 signifying a strengthening of ties and both countries have discussed bilateral cooperation in business, tourism, science and technology, and agriculture.

==== Slovenian Jews in Israel ====
A sizable Slovenian Jewish community was presently in the Gush Dan area.

=== Spain ===
Francoist Spain did not recognize Israel, citing an international conspiracy of Jews and Freemasons against Spain. Israel and Spain have maintained diplomatic ties since 1986. Nevertheless, Israeli exports to Spain are on the rise, totalling $870 million in 2006, and Israeli firms doing business with Spain include the Dead Sea Works, Haifa Chemicals, Amdocs, Comverse and Teva Pharmaceuticals. The Spanish foreign minister visited Israel for an official visit in May 2008.

Since the outbreak of the Gaza war, Spain has been among the most outspoken critics about Israel's actions. As of September 2025, both countries have recalled their respective ambassadors.

=== Sweden ===
Sweden voted in favor of the United Nations Partition Plan for Palestine in 1947. Relations between Sweden and Israel were good during the 1950s and 1960s, and Sweden expressed strong support for Israel during the Six-Day War. However, from 1969, Sweden became more critical of Israel. In October 2014, Sweden became the first European Union member to officially recognize the State of Palestine.

=== Switzerland ===
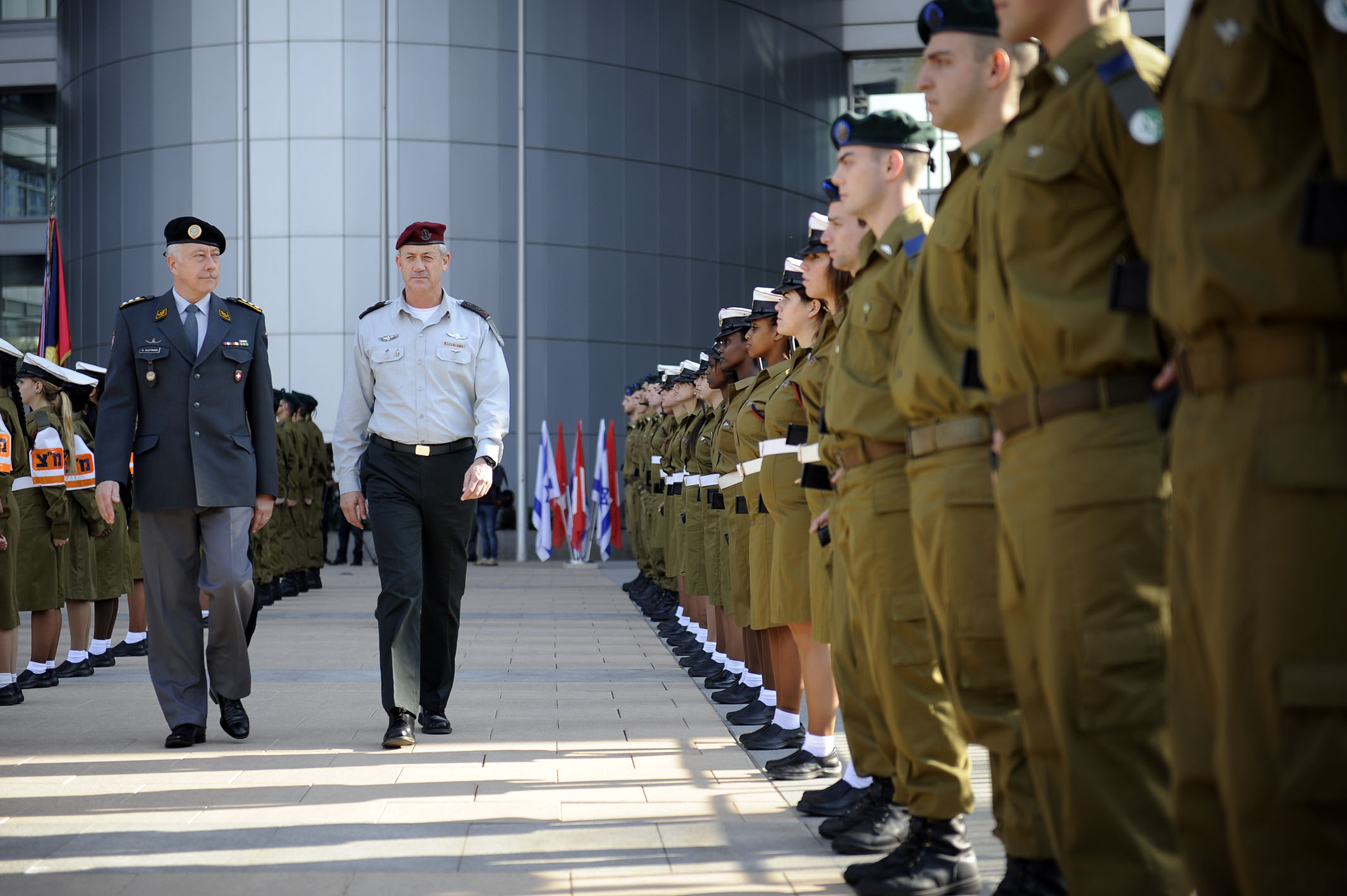
The Chief of the Swiss Armed Forces, André Blattmann, visiting Israel as a guest of IDF Chief of General Staff, Benny Gantz, 27 November 2011

The First Zionist Congress was held in Basel in 1897, and 15 out of a total of 22 congresses were held in Switzerland. Before the establishment of the State of Israel, Switzerland maintained a consulate in Jerusalem and a consular agency in Tel Aviv. It recognized the new state in 1949 and opened a consulate in Tel Aviv, which was upgraded to an embassy in 1958. The Swiss community in Israel is the largest in the Asian region, totalling around 12,000 persons.

After escalation of the Middle East conflict, Switzerland halted arms sales and military cooperation with Israel from 2002 to 2005. Since 2004, there has been regular political dialogue between Switzerland and Israel.

Switzerland has represented Israel's interests in numerous countries (Hungary (1967–1989), Guinea (1967–1973), Ceylon/Sri Lanka (1970–1976), Madagascar (1973–1994), Liberia (1973–1983) and Ghana (1973–2002)). Conversely, it has represented the interests of Iran (1958–1987) and Ivory Coast (1973–1986) in Israel. It also lobbied successfully for inclusion of Magen David Adom in the Red Cross and Red Crescent movement.

On 21 April 2009, Israel recalled its ambassador for consultations due to events that occurred at the UN anti-racism conference in Geneva, Switzerland. Israeli officials, angered by a meeting between Swiss President Hans-Rudolf Merz and the Iranian president, recalled its ambassador to Switzerland, Ilan Elgar "for consultations" amid ongoing controversy over an anti-racism conference being held in Geneva.

=== Ukraine ===
Both countries established diplomatic relations on 26 December 1991. Israel has an embassy in Kyiv. Ukraine has an embassy in Tel Aviv and a consulate-general in Haifa. In July 2010 the foreign ministers of two countries sign an agreement of non-visa traffic between Israel and Ukraine. This came into effect on 9 February 2011 and since then Ukrainians and Israelis may enter territory, travel through it or stay on Ukraine/Israel without having to obtain visas for 90 days within a period of 180 days.

=== United Kingdom ===
Israel established diplomatic relations with the United Kingdom in 1950.

- Israel maintains an embassy in London.
- The United Kingdom is accredited to Israel through its embassy in Tel Aviv.

The UK governed Israel from 1921 until 1948, when it achieved full independence. Both countries share common membership of the OECD, and the World Trade Organization. Bilaterally the two countries have a Trade and Partnership Agreement, a Reciprocal Healthcare Agreement, and a Strategic Partnership. The two countries are currently negotiating a new Free Trade Agreement.

Relations between the Israel and the UK began as hostile. During the 1948 Arab–Israeli war, Britain detained 8,000 Jewish men of military age attempting to make aliyah to Israel in Cyprus, so they could not participate in the fighting. Britain supplied weapons to the Arab states, and almost went to war with Israel. When Israel captured the Negev, the British Ministry of Defence began to draw up plans for a possible invasion of Israel. British planes spied on Israeli positions, and war between the two countries became even more possible when four British planes were shot down by Israel. However, the two countries began to soften later on, and trade began. In 1956 Israel invaded Sinai Peninsula in agreement with France and the UK that invaded Suez. Nevertheless, Anglo-Israeli relations became turbulent in the summer of 2006 when Prime Minister Tony Blair, along with many other European leaders criticized IDF airstrikes against Hezbollah targets in Lebanon, which had high civilian casualties. During the Cameron premiership, relations between the two countries continued to remain close.

== Central America ==
=== Belize ===
- Both countries established diplomatic relations in 1983.
- Belize is represented in Israel through its embassy in London.
- Israel is represented in Belize through its embassy in San Salvador.
- Since 2011, both countries have an agreement on visa exemption for holders of diplomatic, service and national passports.
- In November 2023, Belize suspended diplomatic ties with Israel over its refusal to implement a ceasefire for the Gaza war.

=== Costa Rica ===
Costa Rica was one of the first countries to vote in favor of the establishment of the State of Israel. It maintained its embassy in Jerusalem until August 2006, when it finally relocated to Tel Aviv in order to bolster its ties with the Arab world. In December 2011, Rodrigo Carreras became the Costa Rican ambassador to Israel for the second time, after his posting there in the 1980s. Carreras' father, Benjamin Nunez, also served as the Costa Rican ambassador to Israel.

=== Guatemala ===
Following Israel's independence, Guatemala was the first country to open an embassy in Jerusalem in 1959. The embassy was later relocated to Tel Aviv. However, on 16 May 2018 Guatemala again moved its embassy back to Jerusalem. The move to Jerusalem followed two days after the opening of the United States' Embassy to Israel in the city.

=== Haiti ===
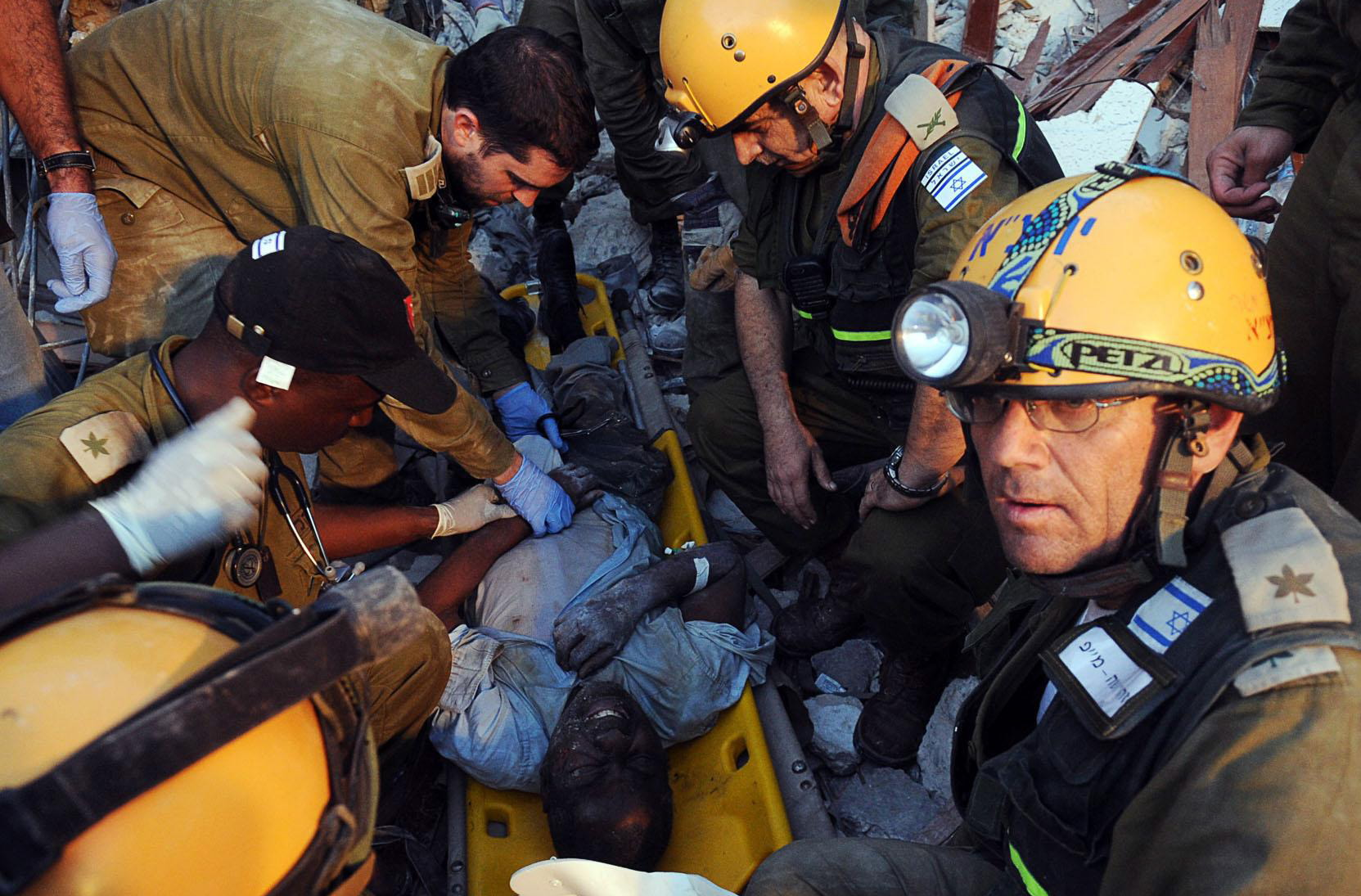
Israeli rescue workers in Haiti

Haiti and Israel maintain full diplomatic relations. In 1947, Haiti voted for the UN Partition Plan and the creation of the State of Israel. Israel was among the first to send both personnel and aid to Haiti following the devastating earthquake in 2010.

=== Dominican Republic ===
- Both countries established diplomatic relations in 1979.
- Israel is represented in Dominican Republic through its embassy in Santo Domingo, Dominican Republic.
- Both countries have an agreement on visa abolition.

=== Panama ===
Panama formally recognized the State of Israel on 18 June 1948. The two countries first exchanged in 1960.

Panama voted with Israel against UN resolution 67/19, as well as UN resolution 70/70, and in 2012 had a 30% voting coincidence with Israel.

=== Nicaragua ===
1974–1978: Israel sold arms to Somoza régime.

On 1 June 2010, Nicaragua suspended diplomatic ties with Israel in response to the Gaza flotilla raid. Relations were restored in March 2017.

In October 2024, Nicaragua once again severed diplomatic ties with Israel due to the Israeli war on Gaza and Lebanon, calling the Israeli government "fascist" and "genocidal".

== North America ==
=== Canada ===
Canada's relationship with Israel began in 1947, when Canada was represented on the United Nations Special Committee on Palestine (UNSCOP). Canada was one of the 33 countries (including only four Commonwealth members) that voted in favour of the 1947 UN partition Plan, thus beginning a longstanding relationship with the Jewish state based on a shared commitment to democratic values, understanding, and mutual respect.

=== Cuba ===
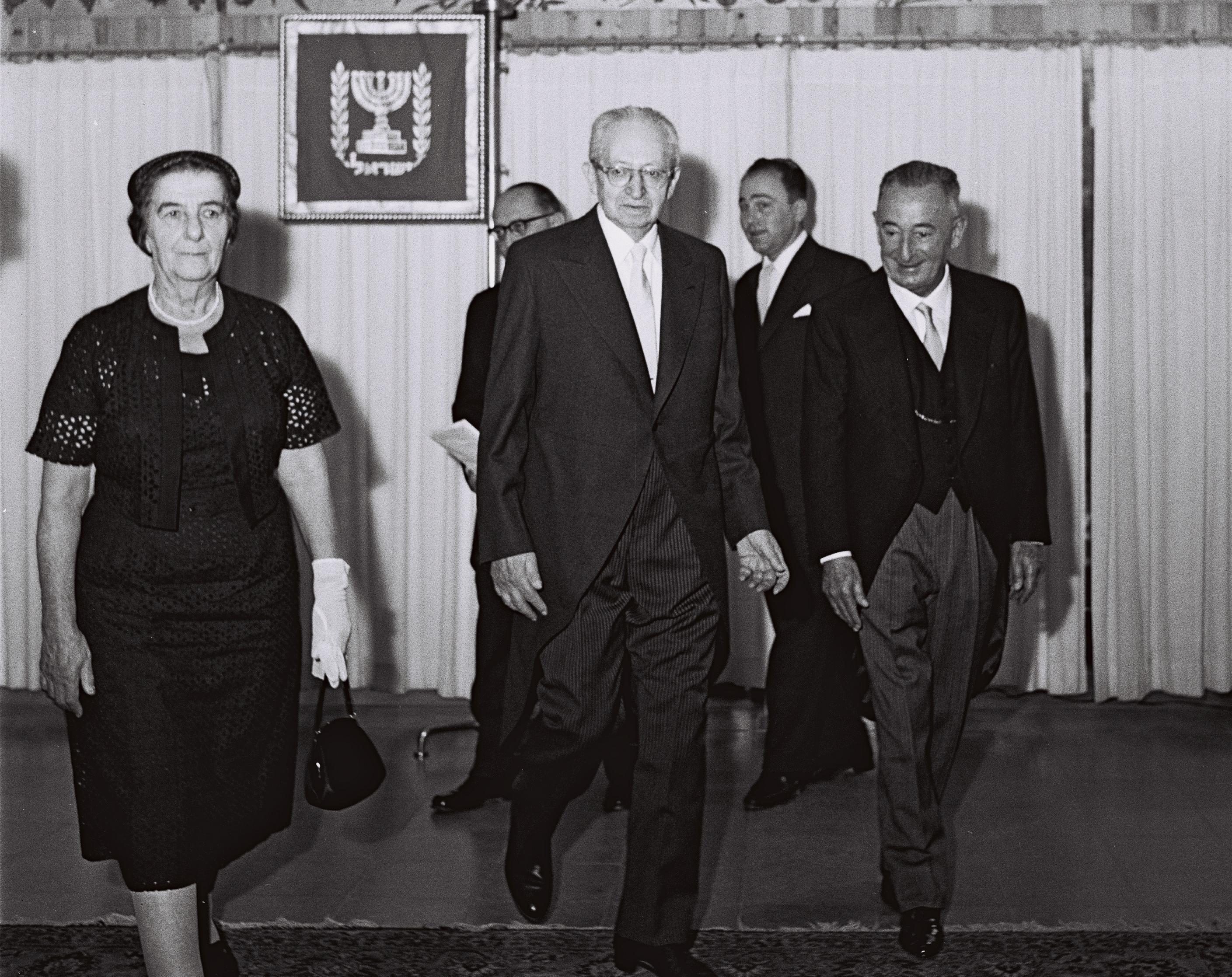
Cuban ambassador to Israel with Golda Meir, 1960

Cuba sent troops to fight against Israel during the War of Attrition. Cuba also joined the expeditionary forces during the 1973 Yom Kippur War, and broke diplomatic relations with Israel the same year.

As Cuba's enemy and a very close United States ally, Israel was the only country in the world that consistently sided with the U.S. blockade against Cuba.

In late 2010, Fidel Castro, who at this time no longer held office in Cuba's government, stated that he believes Israel has a 'right to exist', which is a shift from his régime's earlier policy.

=== Mexico ===
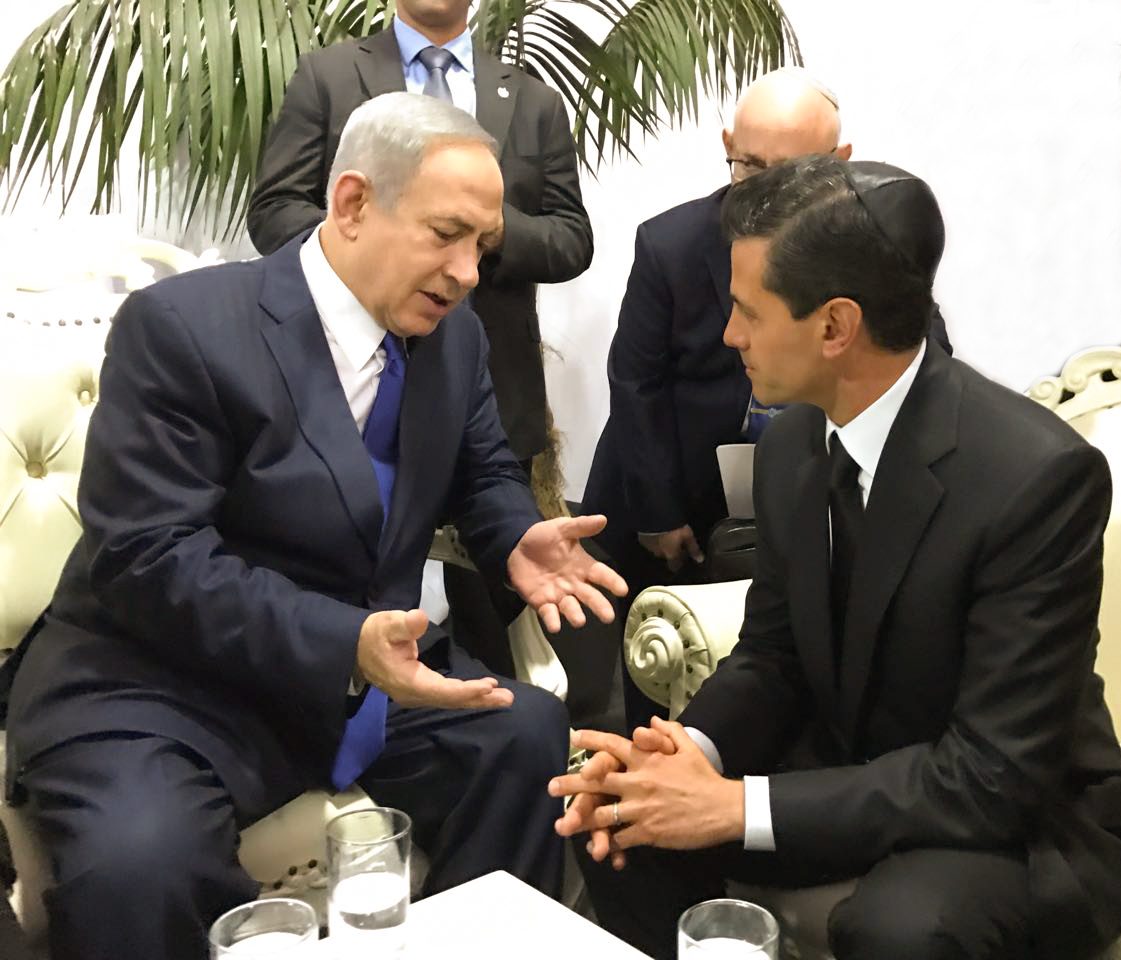
Israeli Prime Minister Benyamin Netanyahu meeting with Mexican President Enrique Peña Nieto in Jerusalem, 2016

Mexico and Israel have had diplomatic relations since January 1950. Throughout the years, they have maintained close relations with each other. In 2000, a free trade agreement was signed between the two nations. Mexico has also purchased weapons from Israel and is one of Israel's closest allies in the Americas.

=== United States ===
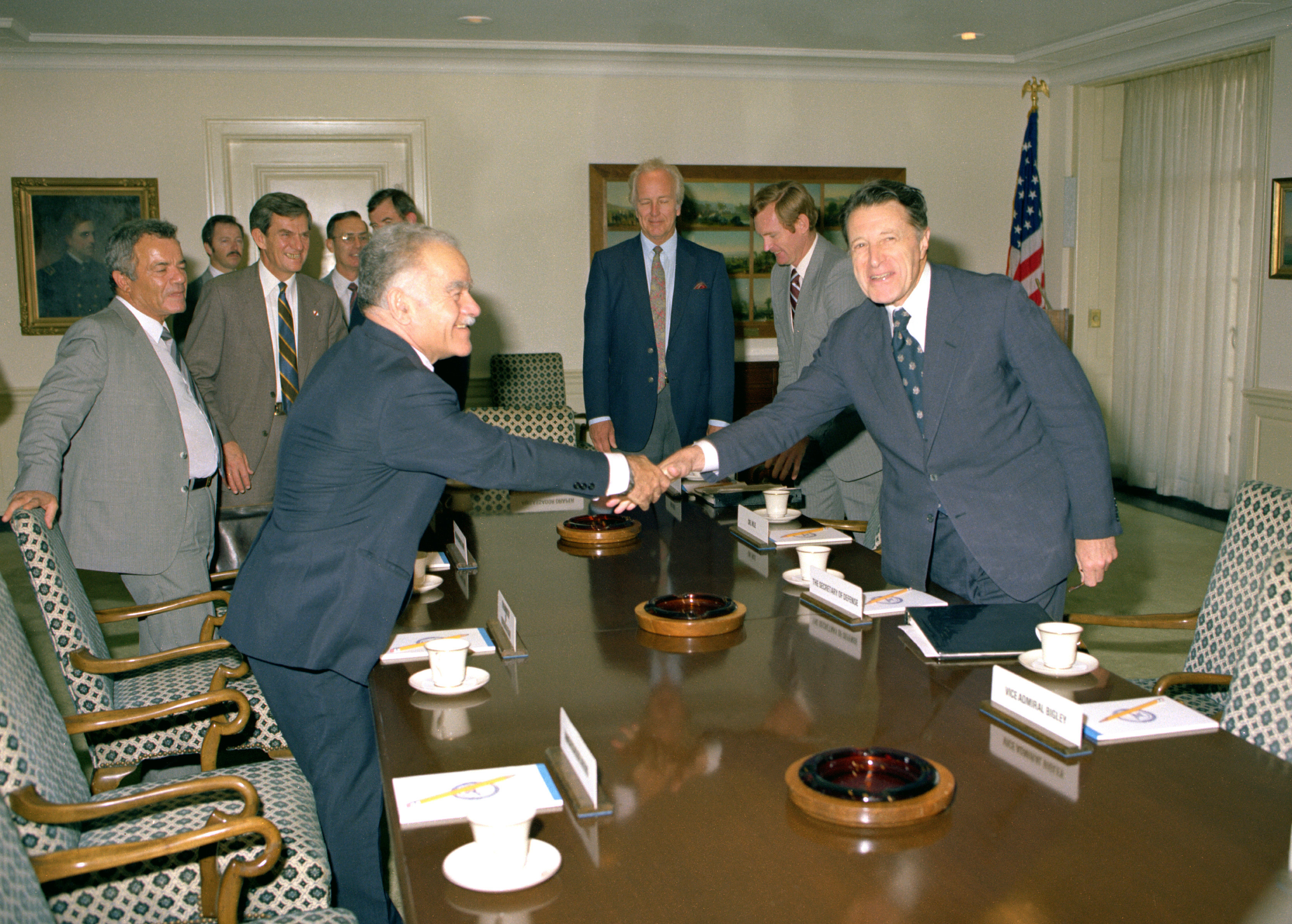
Yitzhak Shamir with U.S. Secretary of Defense Caspar Weinberger, 1982

The relations between Israel and the United States have evolved from an initial United States policy of sympathy and support for the creation of a Jewish state in 1948 (It was the first country to recognize the establishment of the State) to an unusual partnership that links Israel with the United States trying to balance competing interests in the Middle East region. The United States has been considered Israel's most powerful and supportive ally and hosts the annual Salute to Israel Parade in New York City. From 1948 to 2012, the United States has provided Israel with $233.7 billion in aid (after adjusting for inflation). In addition, the US has provided Israel with $19 billion in loan guarantees.

The United States is Israel's largest trading partner, accounting for 22.4 percent of Israel's $43.19 billion in imports, and 42.1 percent of Israel's $40.14 billion in exports annually (2005). The U.S. also provides Israel with $2.4 billion in military assistance annually, which is equivalent to 24.5 percent of Israel's military expenditures. (2005).

== Oceania ==
=== Australia ===
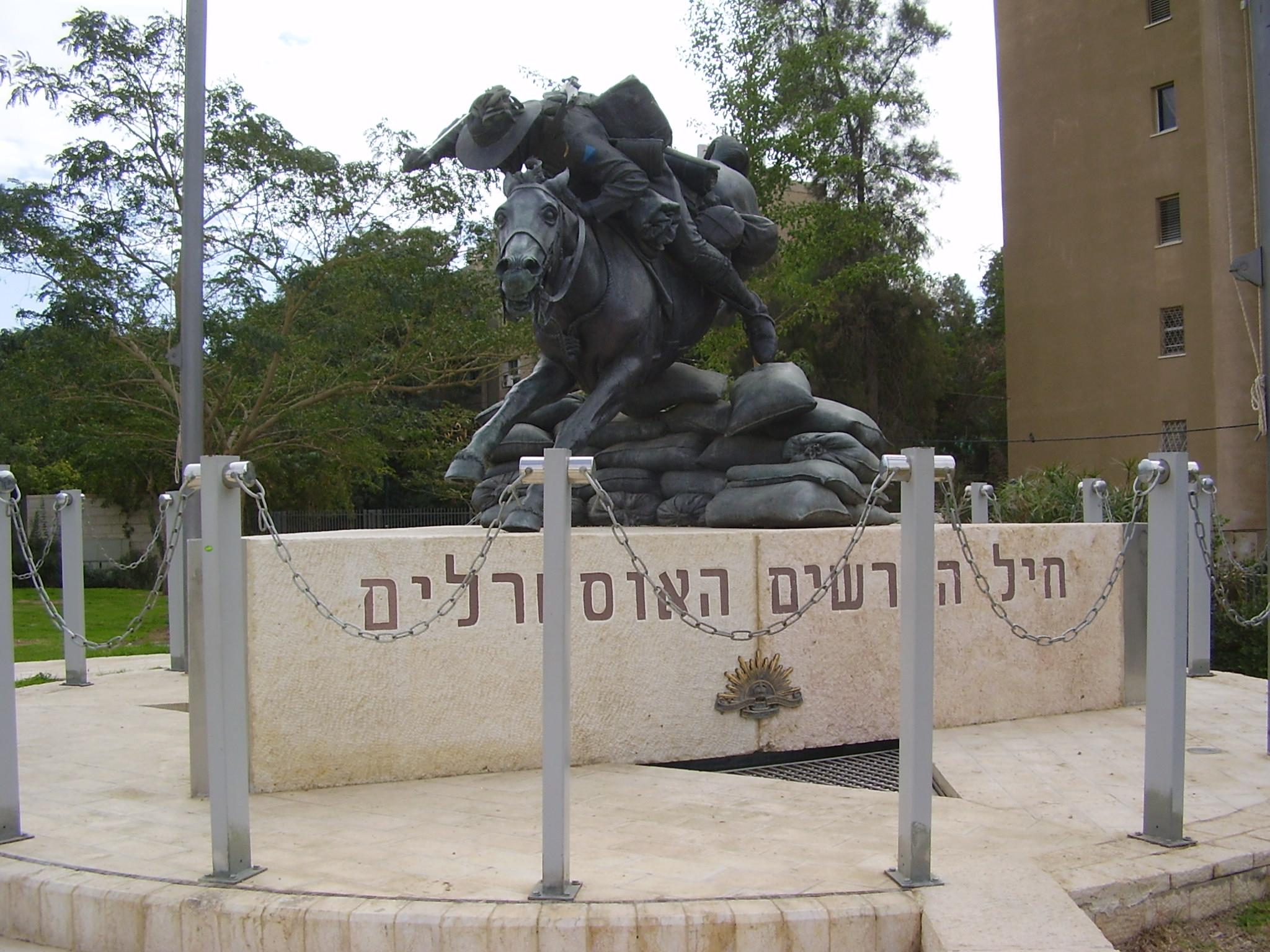
Australian Light Horse Monument in Australian Soldier Park, Beersheba

Australia was one of the four Commonwealth nations to vote in favour of the 1947 UN partition resolution. Australia and Israel established full diplomatic relations in January 1949. Australia has an embassy in Tel Aviv and Israel likewise in Canberra. In May 2010, the Australian government expelled an Israeli diplomat over the misuse of Australian passports in the assassination of Mahmoud Al-Mabhouh, which Foreign Minister Stephen Smith said was "not the act of a friend."

=== Marshall Islands ===
The Marshall Islands is one of the most consistent supporters of Israel international affairs, along with the United States, Micronesia and Palau. The Marshall Islands is a country in free association with the United States, and thus consistently vote in favor of the United States.

=== Micronesia ===
The Federated States of Micronesia is one of the most consistent supporters of Israel in voting at the UN.

In January 2010, the President of the Federated States of Micronesia, Emanuel Mori, and the President of the Republic of Nauru, Marcus Stephen, with their foreign ministers, visited Israel to expand ties on issues such as healthcare, solar energy, water conservation, clean technologies and other areas in which Israel can provide expertise. They met with Israeli leaders including the Prime Minister Benjamin Netanyahu, President Shimon Peres and Minister of Foreign Affairs Avigdor Lieberman.

=== Nauru ===
Israel and the Republic of Nauru established diplomatic relations in December 1994. Nauru recognized Jerusalem as Israel's capital in 2019.

=== New Zealand ===
New Zealand was one of the four Commonwealth nations to vote in favour of the 1947 UN partition resolution. Since then, most New Zealand governments have been supportive of Israel. After 53 years of full diplomatic relations, the Israeli Embassy in Wellington closed in 2004 due to $5.4 million in cost-cuts by the Israeli Foreign Ministry. It was speculated that trade with Arab countries were a major factor. In June 2004, the New Zealand Government criticized Israel's policy of bulldozing Palestinian homes and donated $534,000 to aid homeless Palestinians. At one time there were four missions in the South Pacific area in Canberra, Sydney, Wellington and Suva in Fiji. Following the closure, only Canberra remained open, which was responsible for New Zealand-Israeli Relations. In 2009, the Israel Foreign Ministry announced the reopening of the embassy in Wellington.

In mid-2004, two suspected Mossad agents were jailed for three months and paid a $35,000 fine for trying on false grounds to obtain a New Zealand passport. High-level visits between the two countries were cancelled, visa restrictions imposed for Israeli officials, and an expected visit to New Zealand by Israeli president Moshe Katsav was cancelled. More than a year later, Israel apologized and New Zealand Prime Minister Helen Clark announced that it was time to resume friendly diplomatic relations with Israel.

=== Niue ===
Diplomatic relations between Israel and Niue were established on 3 August 2023.

=== Palau ===
Palau is one of the most consistent supporters of Israel in the United Nations and other international affairs along with the United States, Micronesia and the Marshall Islands. In 2006, Palau had the highest voting coincidence with Israel in the United Nations.

=== Tuvalu ===
Israel maintains a non-resident embassy to Tuvalu in Jerusalem and Tuvalu has voted together with Israel against UN resolutions furthering Palestinian sovereignty on occasion.

== South America ==
=== Argentina ===
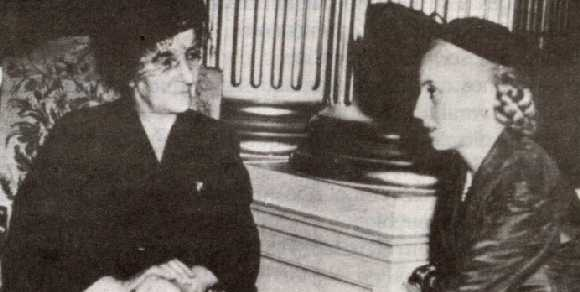
Golda Meir with Eva Perón

In 1992, three Israeli diplomats were killed in the bombing of the Israeli Embassy which left 29 people dead and 240 wounded. Two years later, another bombing took place at the AMIA Jewish community center in Buenos Aires, killing 85 people and wounding 300. The investigation was never completed. Néstor Kirchner called this a national disgrace, and reopened the files.

=== Bolivia ===
In January 2009, Bolivia limited its foreign relationship with Israel in the wake of strikes in Gaza by Israel. Bolivian President Evo Morales has reportedly promised to take Israel to an international court for alleged war crimes committed in Gaza. Bolivia originally granted visa free access to Israeli citizens. However, as a result of Israel's 2014 military operation in Gaza, which it opposed, President Evo Morales declared Israel a "terrorist state" and his government will now require Israeli citizens to obtain a visa to visit Bolivia. Morales has called Israel's treatment of Palestinians "a genocide".

Following Morales's resignation and fleeing to Mexico in November 2019, relations were restored to their previous status.

On 1 November 2023, following the escalation of the Gaza war, Deputy Foreign Minister of Bolivia Freddy Mamani announced that Bolivia would be cutting diplomatic ties with Israel. This made Bolivia the first country to cut relations with Israel in response to the conflict.

Bolivia and Israel officially reestablished relations on 9 December 2025, following Rodrigo Paz Pereira's assumption of office. Israelis were granted visa-free entry to Bolivia.

=== Brazil ===
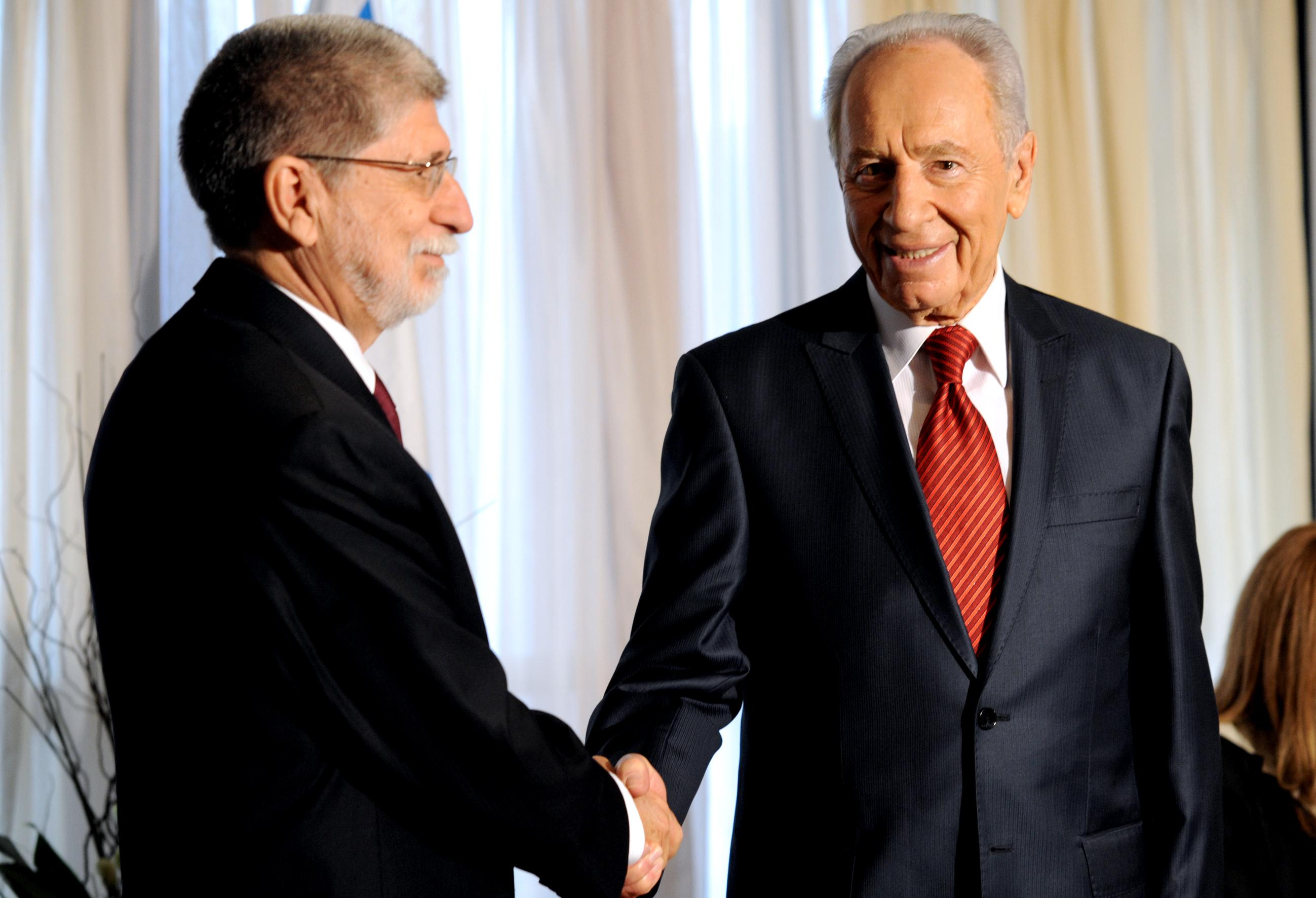
Shimon Peres and Foreign Minister of Brazil, Celso Amorim

Brazil played a large role in the establishment of the State of Israel. Brazil held the Presidency office of the UN General Assembly in 1947, which proclaimed the Partition Plan for Palestine. The Brazilian delegation to the U.N., supported and heavily lobbied for the partition of Palestine toward the creation of the State of Israel. Brazil was also one of the first countries to recognize the State of Israel, on 7 February 1949, less than one year after Israeli Declaration of Independence.

Nowadays, Brazil and Israel maintain close political, economic and military ties. Brazil is a full member state of Israel Allies Caucus, a political advocacy organization that mobilizes pro-Israel parliamentarians in governments worldwide. The two nations enjoy a degree of arms cooperation as Brazil is a key buyer of Israeli weapons and military technology. Also, Brazil is Israel's largest trading partner in Latin America. Israel has an embassy in Brasília and a consulate-general in São Paulo and Brazil has an embassy in Tel Aviv and an honorary consulate in Haifa. A longstanding dispute between Israel and Brazil is ongoing over Brazil's official rejection of a new Israeli ambassador because of his ties to the West Bank.

Brazil-Israel relations improved significantly during the presidency of Jair Bolsonaro (2019 - 2023). Brazilian president Bolsonaro expressed his love for Israel several times. He even said to have turned Brazil into Israel's new best friend. In December 2019, Brazil opened a trade office in Jerusalem. Brazil also considered to move its embassy to Israel from Tel Aviv to Jerusalem.

Brazil has the ninth largest Jewish community in the world, about 107,329 by 2010, according to the IBGE census. The Jewish Confederation of Brazil (CONIB) estimates to more than 120,000.

=== Chile ===
Chile recognized Israel's independence in February 1949. Israel sent its first ambassador to Chile in May 1950, and Chile sent its first ambassador to Israel in June 1952. Prime Minister Golda Meir visited Chile during her term in office. In March 2005, the Chilean minister of foreign affairs Ignacio Walker made an official visit to Israel. Chile is home to the largest Palestinian community outside the Middle East, approximately 500,000.

=== Colombia ===
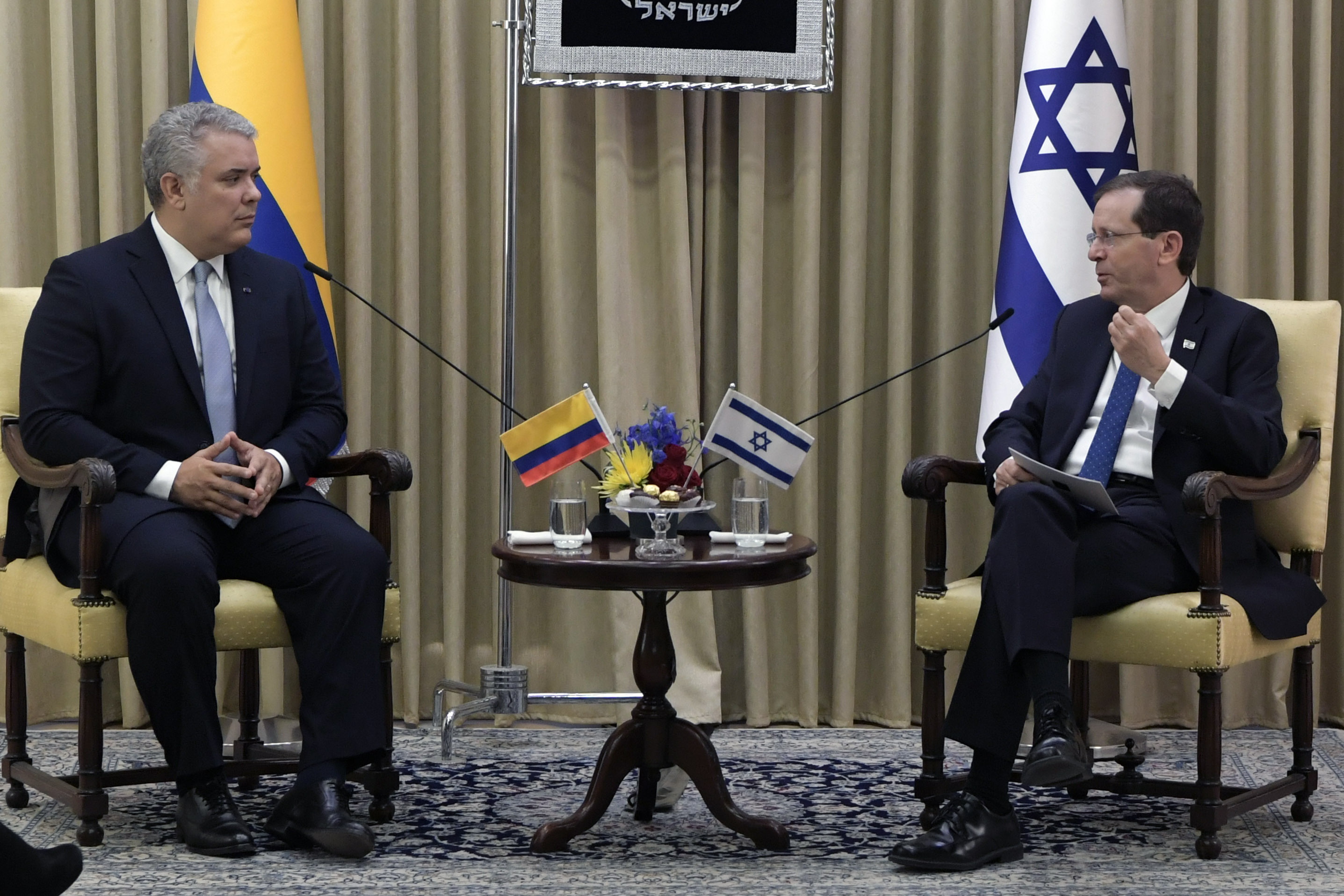
President Iván Duque with President Isaac Herzog

Colombia and Israel established formal relations in the mid-1950s. In recent years, Colombia has purchased planes, drones, weapons and intelligence systems from Israel. An Israeli company, Global CST won a $10 million contract in Colombia. On 1 May 2024, Colombian president Petro announced Colombia would break diplomatic ties with Israel. In August 2026, Colombia’s new president, Abelardo de la Espriella, announced that he will resume diplomatic relations with Israel. On 10 August 2026, Colombia officially recognized Israeli sovereignty over the Golan Heights.

=== Guyana ===
Both countries have established diplomatic relations on 9 March 1992.

=== Paraguay ===
In September 2018, Paraguay announced that it was moving its embassy in Israel out of Jerusalem and back to Tel Aviv, just months after a previous Paraguayan administration had opened the new mission. The US, Guatemala and Paraguay, all moved their embassies to Jerusalem in May 2018. Paraguay said it had officially recognized the military wings of Palestinian group Hamas and Lebanon's Hezbollah as terrorist organizations, drawing praise from Israel. President Mario Abdo Benitez made the declaration in an official document in August 2019.

=== Peru ===
Israel and Peru established diplomatic relations in 1957. In 1998 the two countries began talks on a free-trade agreement. Israel sent rescue teams and medical aid to Peru after earthquakes in 1970, 2005 and 2007. In 2001, Eliane Karp, a former Israeli, became the First Lady of Peru.

=== Suriname ===
Suriname and Israel established diplomatic relations on 24 February 1976. In February 2011, non-resident Israeli ambassador to Suriname, Amiram Magid, criticized the government of Suriname for recognizing the State of Palestine. On 30 May 2022, in a meeting with Israeli Foreign Minister Yair Lapid, Surinamese Foreign Minister Albert Ramdin announced plans to open a Surinamese embassy in Jerusalem in the near future. On 23 June, Surinamese President Chan Santokhi announced the cancellation of the Jerusalem embassy plans, citing a lack of funds.

=== Uruguay ===
Israel has an embassy in Montevideo. Uruguay has an embassy in Tel Aviv and 2 honorary consulates in Ashdod and Haifa. Uruguay was one of the first nations to recognise Israel as independent.

=== Venezuela ===
Relations were once strong, but the bilateral ties soured under the Presidency of Hugo Chávez in Venezuela. The Jewish population in Venezuela, which peaked at 45,000, is now below 15,000 "as a result of severe instability in the country", according to the Israeli Stephen Roth Institute. The Miami Herald, Jewish Times, and Jewish organizations have reported large-scale emigration of Jewish people from Venezuela during the Chávez administration.

Israel and Venezuela resumed consular relations on 11 August 2026, after 17 years.

== Israeli foreign aid ==
Israeli foreign aid comprises primarily development assistance and humanitarian aid provided by Israel to foreign countries. Israel provides assistance to developing countries to alleviate and solve economic and social problems through its international cooperation program of technical assistance, based on its own recent and ongoing experience in developing human and material resources. Israel's Agency for International Development Cooperation, established as an agency of the Israeli Foreign Ministry in 1958 and known by its Hebrew acronym, MASHAV, is the primary vehicle for providing this aid.

This center trains course participants from approximately 140 countries on healthcare, as well as emergency and disaster medicine, and has participated in dozens of projects worldwide in fields economic fields such as agriculture, education, development, employment, and healthcare, as well as humanitarian fields such as disaster relief, reconstruction, and refugee absorption.

== See also ==
General

- Ministry of Foreign Affairs (Israel)
- Jerusalem Embassy Act
- List of Israeli ambassadors
- List of diplomatic missions in Israel
- List of diplomatic missions of Israel
- International recognition of Israel
- Visa policy of Israel
- Visa requirements for Israeli citizens
- Aliyah
- Jewish diaspora
- IsraAid
- History of Israel

Arab–Israeli peace diplomacy

- Arab–Israeli conflict
- International law and the Arab–Israeli conflict
- Israel and the United Nations
- Palestine and the United Nations
- Israeli–Palestinian peace process
- Faisal–Weizmann Agreement
- 1949 Armistice Agreements
- Camp David Accords
- Madrid Conference of 1991
- Oslo Accords
- Israel–Jordan Treaty of Peace
- 2000 Camp David Summit
- List of Middle East peace proposals
