= Cameroon–United Kingdom relations =

- Cameroon: United Kingdom

Diplomatic mission
- High Commission of Cameroon, London: High Commission of the United Kingdom, Yaoundé

Cameroon and the United Kingdom established diplomatic relations on 1 February 1960.

Both countries share common membership of the Commonwealth, the United Nations, and the World Trade Organization. Bilaterally the two countries have an Economic Partnership Agreement.

== History ==
The United Kingdom governed the Southern Cameroons from 1916 to 1961 under a League of Nations mandate then a United Nations trusteeship, after which it joined the Republic of Cameroon to form present-day Cameroon.

== Economic relations ==
From 4 August 2014 until 30 December 2020, trade between Cameroon and the UK was governed by the Cameroon–European Union Economic Partnership Agreement, while the United Kingdom was a member of the European Union.

Following the withdrawal of the United Kingdom from the European Union, the UK and Cameroon signed the Cameroon–United Kingdom Economic Partnership Agreement on 28 December 2020. The Cameroon–United Kingdom Economic Partnership Agreement is a continuity trade agreement, based on the EU free trade agreement, which entered into force on 1 January 2021. Trade value between Cameroon and the United Kingdom was worth £745 million in 2022.

== Diplomatic missions ==
- Cameroon maintains a high commission in London.
- The United Kingdom is accredited to Cameroon through its high commission in Yaoundé.

== See also ==
- British Cameroons
- Foreign relations of Cameroon
- Foreign relations of the United Kingdom
