= List of ambassadors of Cameroon to the United States =

Coordinates: 38°54′49.5″N 77°3′8.3″W

Ambassador of Cameroon to United States Embassy of Cameroon, Washington, D.C.
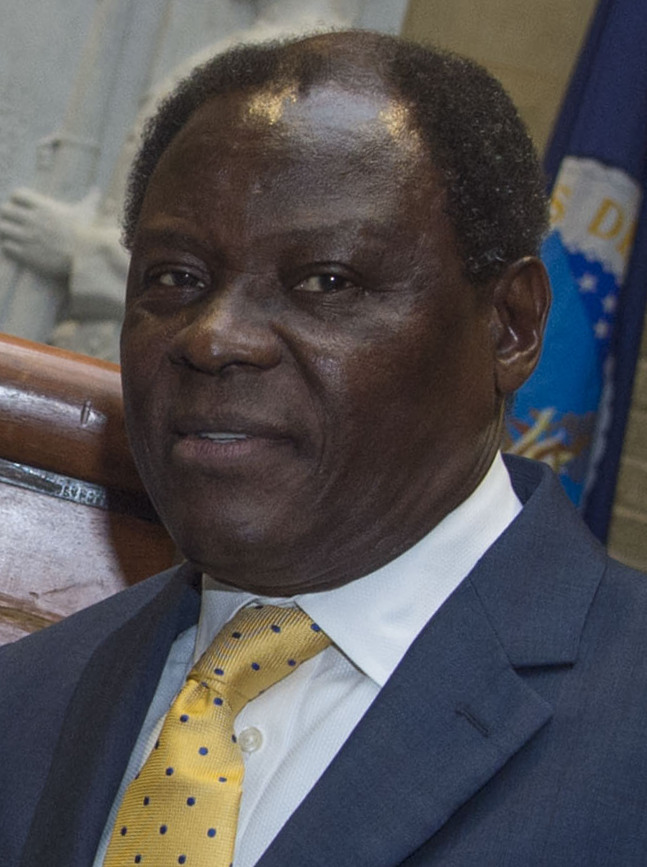
- Incumbent; Henri Étoundi Essomba since June 27, 2016
- Inaugural holder: Aimé Raymond N'Thepe
- Formation: January 16, 1961

The Cameroonian ambassador in Washington, D. C. is the official representative of the Government in Yaoundé to the Government of the United States.

== List of representatives ==
Diplomatic agrément	Diplomatic accreditation	Ambassador	Observations	List of prime ministers of Cameroon	List of presidents of the United States	Term end
January 16, 1961			Embassy opened	Ahmadou Ahidjo	John F. Kennedy	
December 12, 1960	January 16, 1961	Aimé Raymond N'Thepe	*In 1965 he was ambassador in Bonn.	Ahmadou Ahidjo	Dwight D. Eisenhower	
March 5, 1962	March 9, 1962	Jacques Kuoh-Moukouri		Ahmadou Ahidjo	John F. Kennedy	
December 9, 1965	December 16, 1965	Joseph Owono		Simon Pierre Tchoungui	Lyndon B. Johnson	
November 22, 1970		Michel Koss Epangue	Chargé d'affaires	Simon Pierre Tchoungui	Richard Nixon	
September 23, 1971	October 13, 1971	François Xavier Tchoungui	Mr Ibrahim Mbombo Njoya, who was previously the deputy minister of education, youth, and culture, replaces Mr Francois-Xavier Tchoungui, who has been reassigned.	Simon Pierre Tchoungui	Richard Nixon	
September 12, 1975		Eric Dikoko Quan	Chargé d'affaires, Prior to entering the Foreign Service in 1964, Mr. Eric Dikoko Quan had held several senior positions in the government of the former West Cameroon, notably those of Permanent Secretary in the Ministry of Education and Social Welfare.	Paul Biya	Gerald Ford	
September 30, 1976	November 24, 1976	Benoît Bindzi	1968: Minister for Foreign Affairs *22 Dec. 1981 accredited as Ambassador to the Court of St. James.	Paul Biya	Gerald Ford	
November 18, 1981		Michael Tabong Kima	Chargé d'affaires, 2003 he was Ambassador in Rome.	Paul Biya	Ronald Reagan	
January 8, 1982	January 13, 1982	Paul Pondi		Bello Bouba Maigari	Ronald Reagan	
January 14, 1984			Because of a constitutional change, the state now called: Republic of Cameroon.	Luc Ayang	Ronald Reagan	
June 23, 1994		Jérôme Mendouga		Simon Achidi Achu	Bill Clinton	
September 12, 2008	September 17, 2008	Joseph Bienvenu Charles Foe Atangana	Prior to his appointment, Foe-Atangana served for several years as Cameroon's consul general in Calabar, Nigeria.	Ephraïm Inoni	George W. Bush	

- Cambodia–United States relations
