= Joseph Bienvenu Charles Foe-Atangana =

Cameroonian diplomat

His Excellency Joseph Bienvenu Charles Foe-Atangana
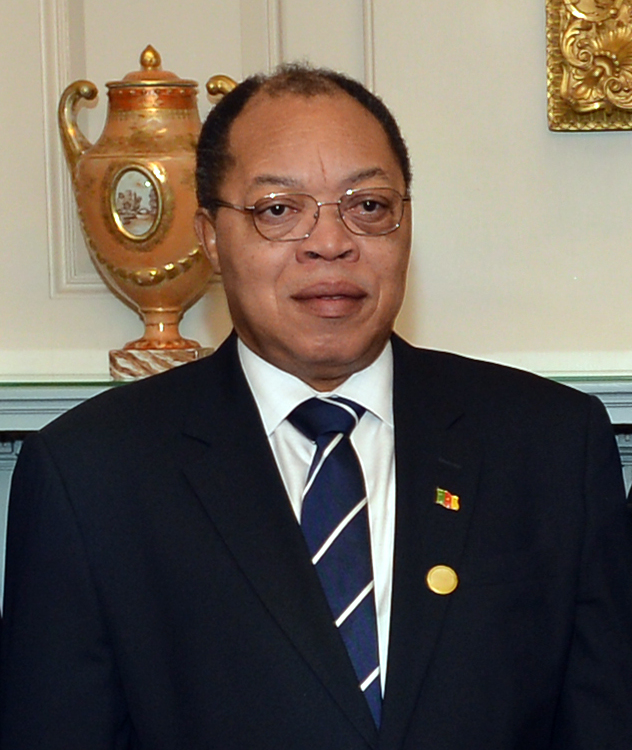
- Joseph Bienvenu In 2014

Ambassador of Cameroon to the United States
- In office 2008–2016
- President: Paul Biya
- Preceded by: Jérôme Mendouga
- Succeeded by: Henri Étoundi Essomba

Personal details
- Born: Joseph Bienvenu Charles Foe-Atangana; January 6, 1952 (age 74) Édéa, Cameroon
- Education: University of Yaoundé; International Relations Institute of Cameroon (IRIC)
- Occupation: Diplomat

Joseph Bienvenu Charles Foe-Atangana MON ChMW (born 6 January 1952) is a Cameroonian career diplomat who served as the Ambassador of Cameroon to the United States from 2008 to 2016. He was dismissed by President Paul Biya and replaced by Henri Étoundi Essomba.

== Biography ==
Foe-Atangana was born on 6 January 1952 in Édéa, in Cameroon’s Littoral Region, where his parents were living and working at the time. He started his schooling between 1958 and 1964 at Saint Joseph School in Mvolyé, then went on to continue his secondary education at Saint Paul Junior Seminary in Mbalmayo and finally finished his studies at Saint Theresa Seminary in Yaoundé.

He obtained the Baccalauréat in 1972, then proceeded to the University of Yaoundé, graduating in 1975 with a Bachelor of Arts in History and English and completing a postgraduate diploma in 1976. Foe-Atangana later completed advanced diplomatic studies at the International Relations Institute of Cameroon (IRIC) in 1978.

=== Ambassador to the United States ===
Foe-Atangana was appointed Ambassador of Cameroon to the United States on 11 March 2008. He presented his letters of credence on 12 September 2008.

He worked extensively during his tenure with the Cameroonian diaspora - especially students - and referred to the embassy as the home for all Cameroonians living in the United States. He also frequently touted Cameroon as a stable nation with a functioning multi-party political system.

== Controversies ==
During his tenure as Ambassador of Cameroon to the United States, Foe‑Atangana was accused of physical assault in a protest incident outside the Embassy in Washington, D.C. According to a report at the time by NBC4 Washington, he “rushed into the crowd and assaulted the leader of the protest, and then pushed a woman to the ground.”

After his tenure as Ambassador to the United States, Foe-Atangana was the subject of unconfirmed reports alleging an FBI inquiry into the financial activities of the Cameroonian Embassy, including its diplomatic accounts. The embassy rejected these claims, stating that neither Foe-Atangana nor any staff member had been questioned or implicated in any wrongdoing.

== Honours ==
- Knight of the Cameroon Order of Merit
- Member of the National Order of Niger (Nigeria)
- Knight of the Order of the Crown (Belgium)

Political offices
Preceded by Joseph Bienvenu Charles Foe Atangana	Ambassador of Cameroon to the United States; September 12, 2008 – September 17, 2008	Succeeded by Henri Étoundi Essomba
