= List of diplomatic missions of Cameroon =

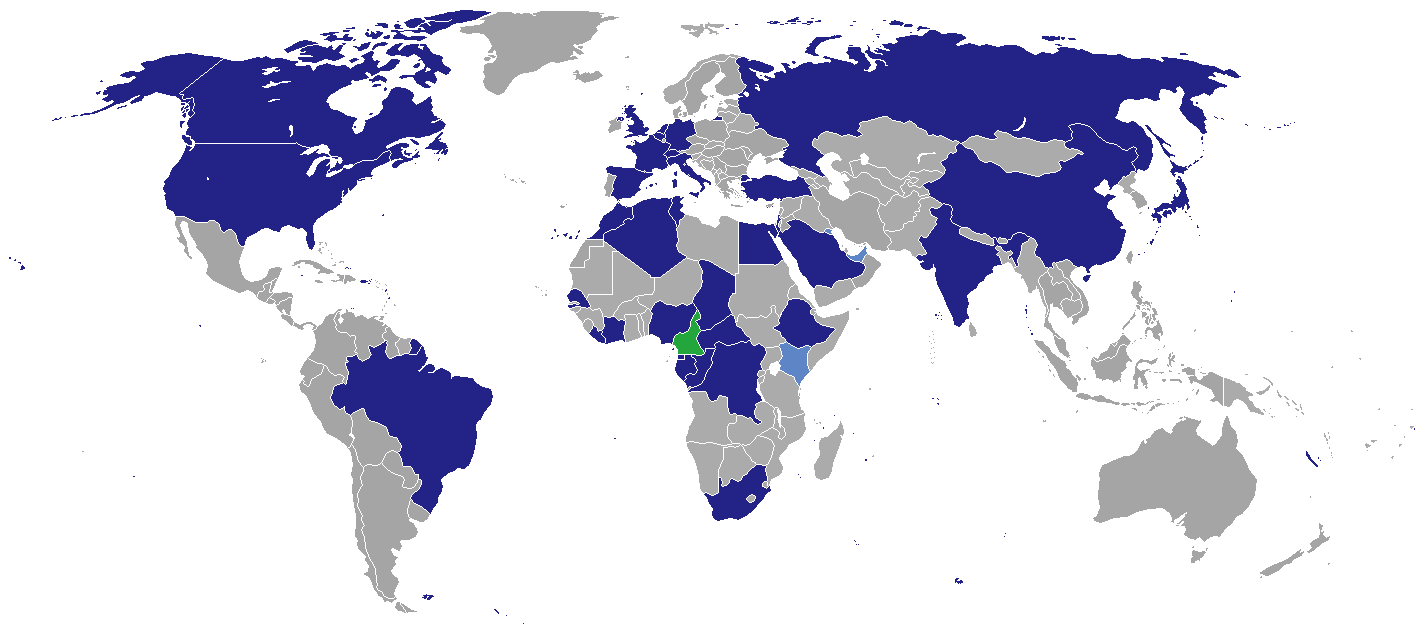
Location of diplomatic missions of Cameroon: Cameroon Embassy or High Commission

This is a list of diplomatic missions of Cameroon. Cameroon has an extensive network of diplomatic missions, reflecting strong ties and non-contentious standing with other African states, its special relationships with France, the United States, Russia, and China, and its unique position of being both a member of the Commonwealth of Nations and Francophonie.

Trade missions and honorary consulates are excluded from this listing.

== Africa ==
- Algeria
  - Algiers (Embassy)
- Central African Republic
  - Bangui (Embassy)
  - Bouar (Consulate)
- Chad
  - N'Djamena (Embassy)
- Congo-Brazzaville
  - Brazzaville (Embassy)
  - Ouesso (Consulate-General)
- Congo-Kinshasa
  - Kinshasa (Embassy)
- Egypt
  - Cairo (Embassy) (Note: Also accredited to Jordan, Lebanon, Sudan, and Syria.)
- Equatorial Guinea
  - Malabo (Embassy)
  - Bata (Consulate)
  - Mongomo (Consulate)
- Ethiopia
  - Addis Ababa (Embassy) (Note: Also accredited to African Union, Djibouti, Kenya, , and United Nations Economic Commission for Africa.)
- Ivory Coast
  - Abidjan (Embassy) (Note: Also accredited to Burkina Faso, Ghana, and Togo.)
- Gabon
  - Libreville (High Commission)
- Kenya
  - Nairobi (Consulate) (Note: Subordinate to the embassy in Addis Ababa; also accredited to the United Nations Environment Programme.)
- Liberia
  - Monrovia (Embassy)
- Morocco
  - Rabat (Embassy)
- Nigeria
  - Abuja (High Commission)
  - Lagos (Consulate-General)
  - Calabar (Consulate)
- Senegal
  - Dakar (Embassy) (Note: Also accredited to Gambia, Mali, and Mauritania.)
- South Africa
  - Pretoria (High Commission) (Note: Also accredited to Botswana, Comoros, Eswatini, Lesotho, Madagascar, Malawi, Mauritius, Mozambique, Namibia, Seychelles, Tanzania, Zambia, Zimbabwe.)
- Tunisia
  - Tunis (Embassy) (Note: Also accredited to Libya.)

== Americas ==
- Brazil
  - Brasília (Embassy) (Note: Also accredited to Paraguay, Trinidad and Tobago, and Uruguay.)
- Canada
  - Ottawa (High Commission)
- United States
  - Washington, D.C. (Embassy) (Note: Also accredited to Costa Rica.)

== Asia ==
- China
  - Beijing (Embassy) (Note: Also accredited to Indonesia, Malaysia, Philippines, and the Thailand.)
- India
  - New Delhi (High Commission)
- Israel
  - Tel Aviv (Embassy)
- Japan
  - Tokyo (Embassy) (Note: Also accredited to Australia and New Zealand.)
- Kuwait
  - Kuwait City (Consulate-General) (Note: Subordinate to the embassy in Riyadh.)
- Saudi Arabia
  - Riyadh (Embassy) (Note: Also accredited to Bahrain, Kuwait, Oman, Qatar, and the United Arab Emirates.)
  - Jeddah (Consulate-General)
- South Korea
  - Seoul (Embassy)
- Turkey
  - Ankara (Embassy)
- United Arab Emirates
  - Dubai (Consulate-General) (Note: Subordinate to the embassy in Riyadh.)

== Europe ==
- Belgium
  - Brussels (Embassy) (Note: Also accredited to the European Union.)
- France
  - Paris (Embassy) (Note: Also accredited to Portugal.)
  - Marseille (Consulate)
- Germany
  - Berlin (Embassy) (Note: Also accredited to Austria, Poland, Serbia, and Slovakia.)
- Holy See
  - Rome (Embassy) (Note: The Cameroonian Embassy to the Holy See is located outside Vatican territory in Rome; also accredited to the Sovereign Military Order of Malta.)
- Italy
  - Rome (Embassy) (Note: Also accredited to Romania, Serbia, Food and Agriculture Organization, International Fund for Agricultural Development, and the World Food Programme)
- Netherlands
  - The Hague (Embassy) (Note: Also accredited to Luxembourg and the Organisation for the Prohibition of Chemical Weapons.)
- Russia
  - Moscow (Embassy) (Note: Also accredited to Armenia, Azerbaijan, Bulgaria, and Czechia.)
- Spain
  - Madrid (Embassy)
- Switzerland
  - Bern (Embassy) (Note: Also accredited to Cyprus.)
- United Kingdom
  - London (High Commission) (Note: Also accredited to Denmark, Finland, Ireland, Norway, and Sweden.)

== Multilateral organisations ==
- International Civil Aviation Organization
  - Montreal (Permanent Mission)
- United Nations
  - New York City (Permanent Mission) (Note: Also accredited to Guatemala.)
  - Geneva (Permanent Mission)
- UNESCO
  - Paris (Permanent Mission)

== Gallery ==
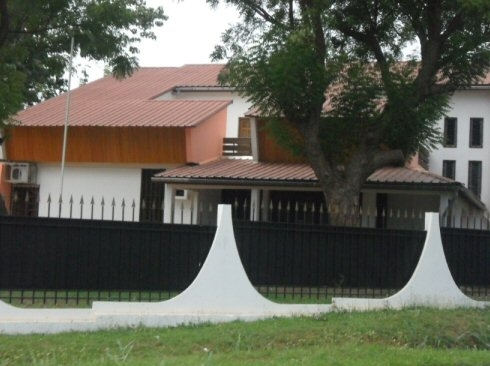
Embassy in Bangui

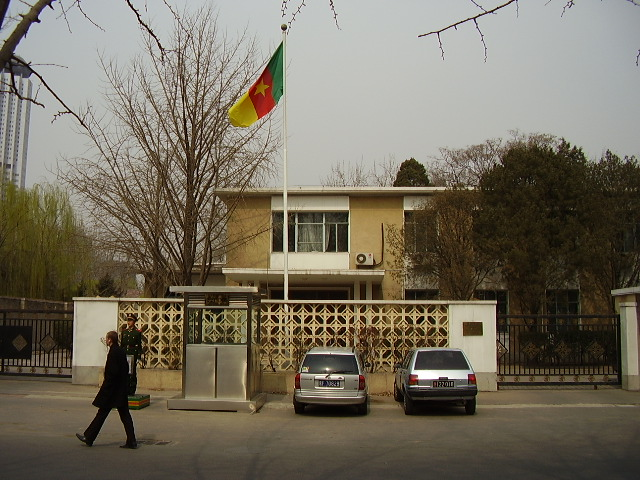
Embassy in Beijing

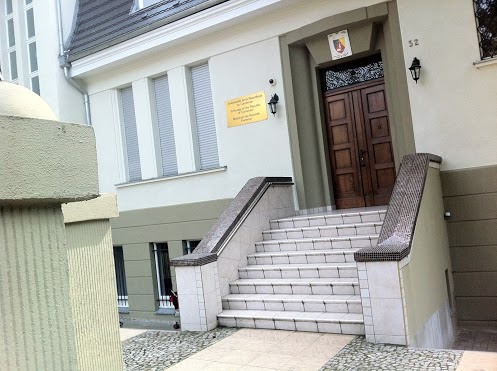
Embassy in Berlin

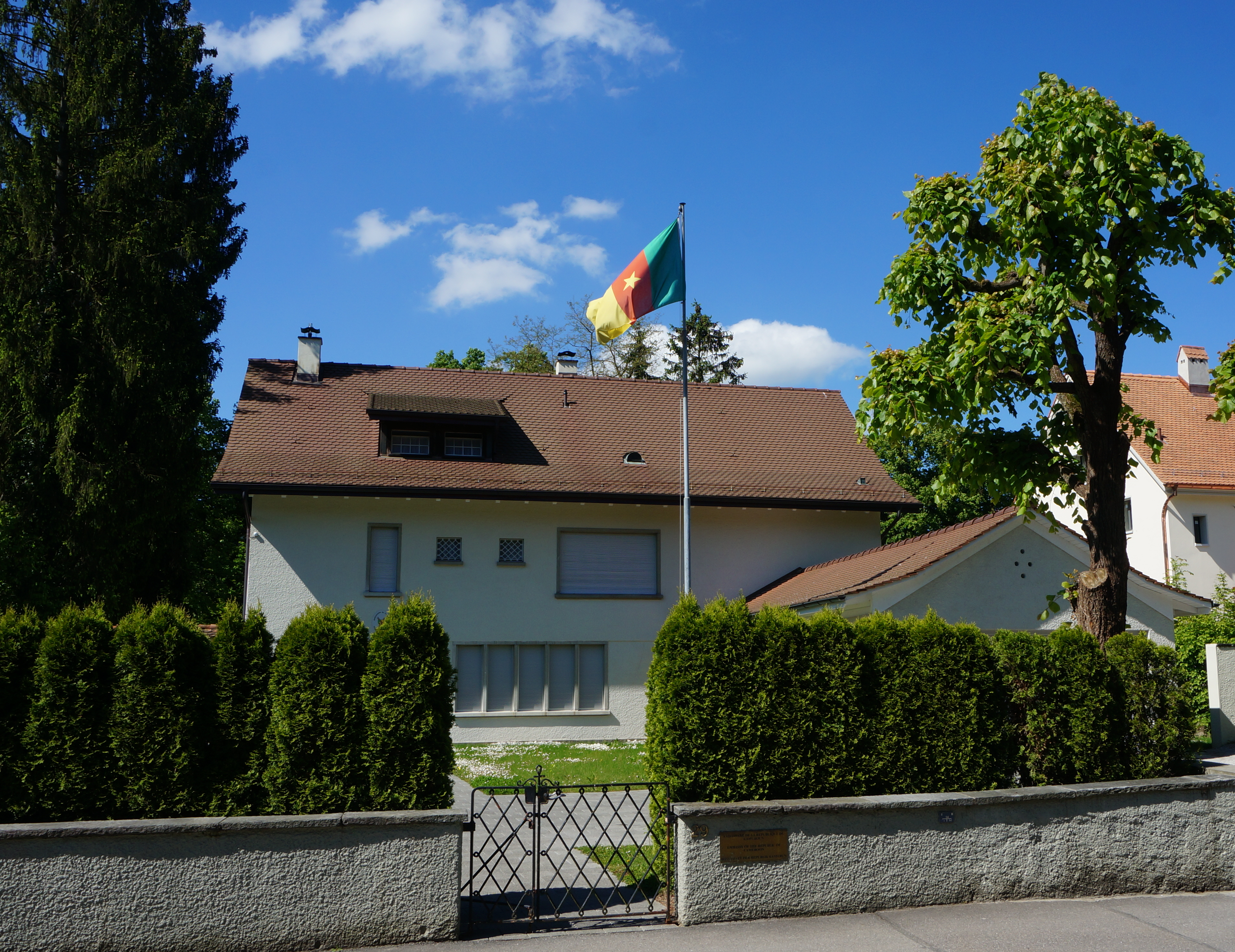
Embassy in Bern

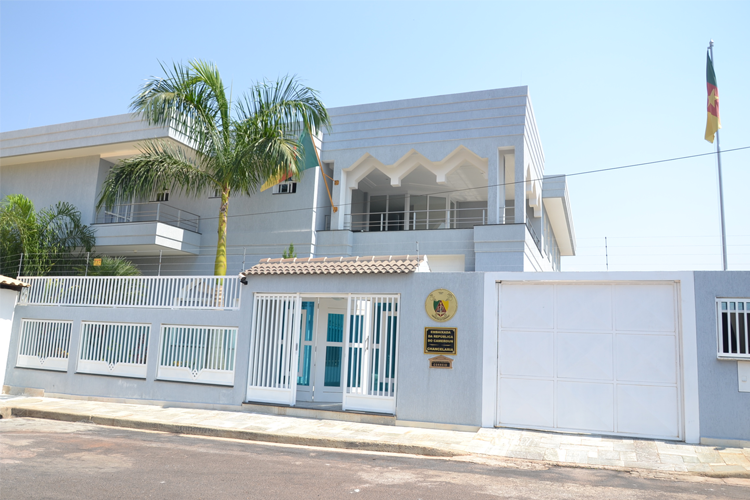
Embassy in Brasilia

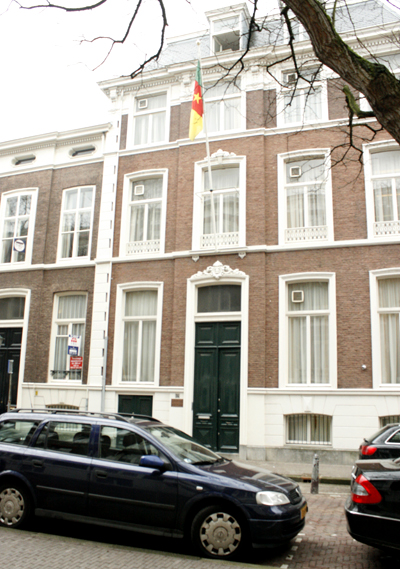
Embassy in The Hague

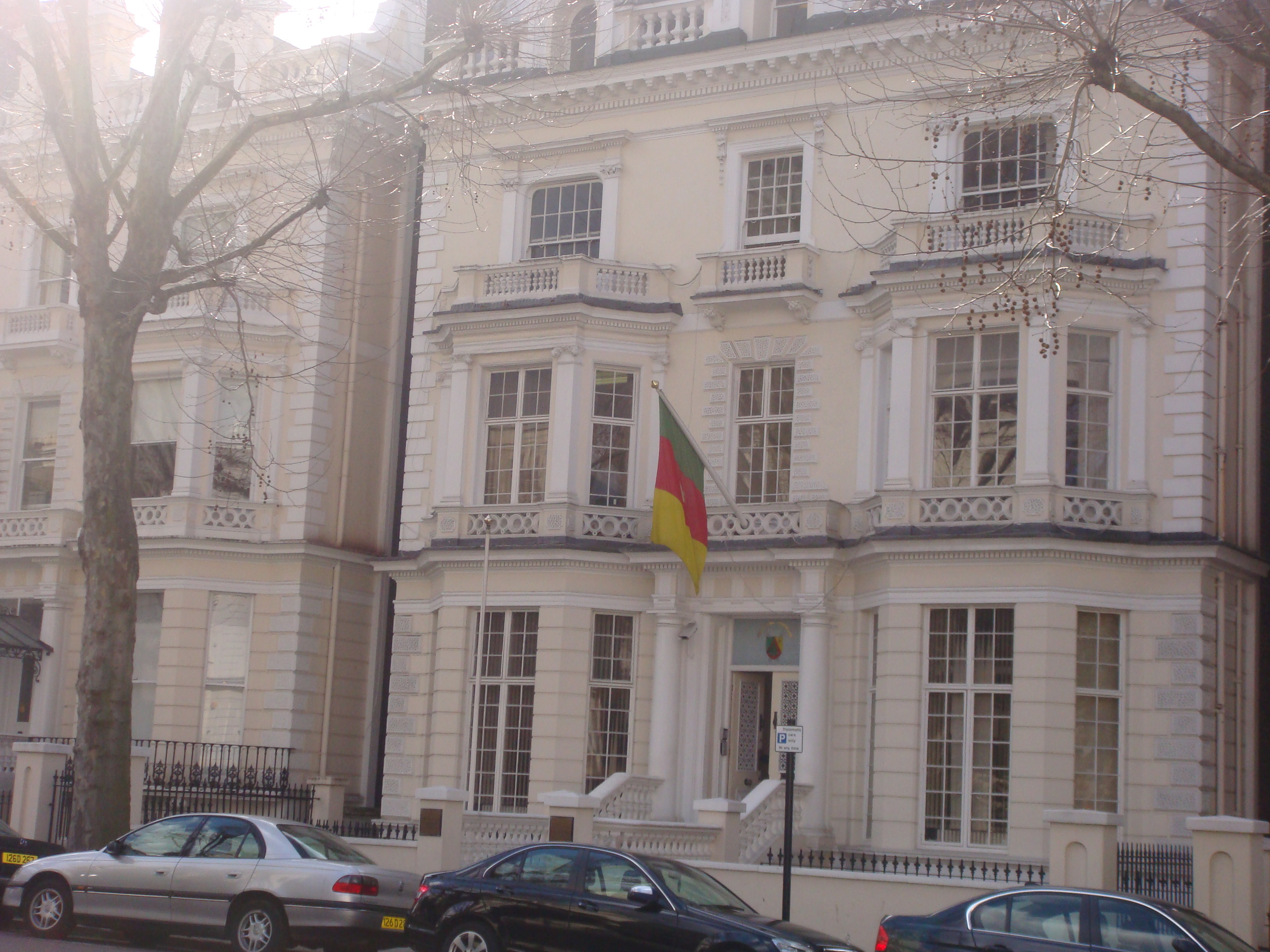
High Commission in London

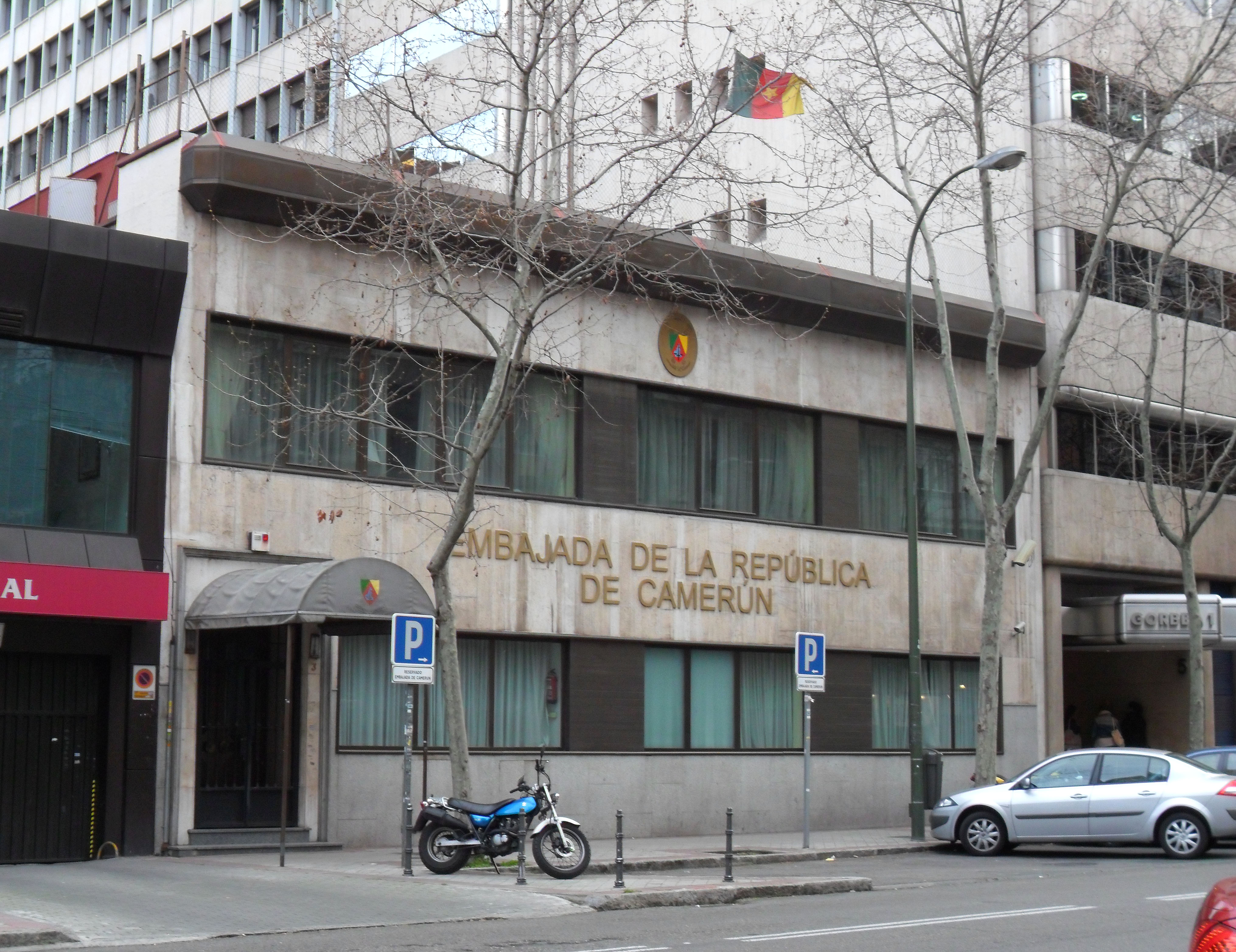
Embassy in Madrid

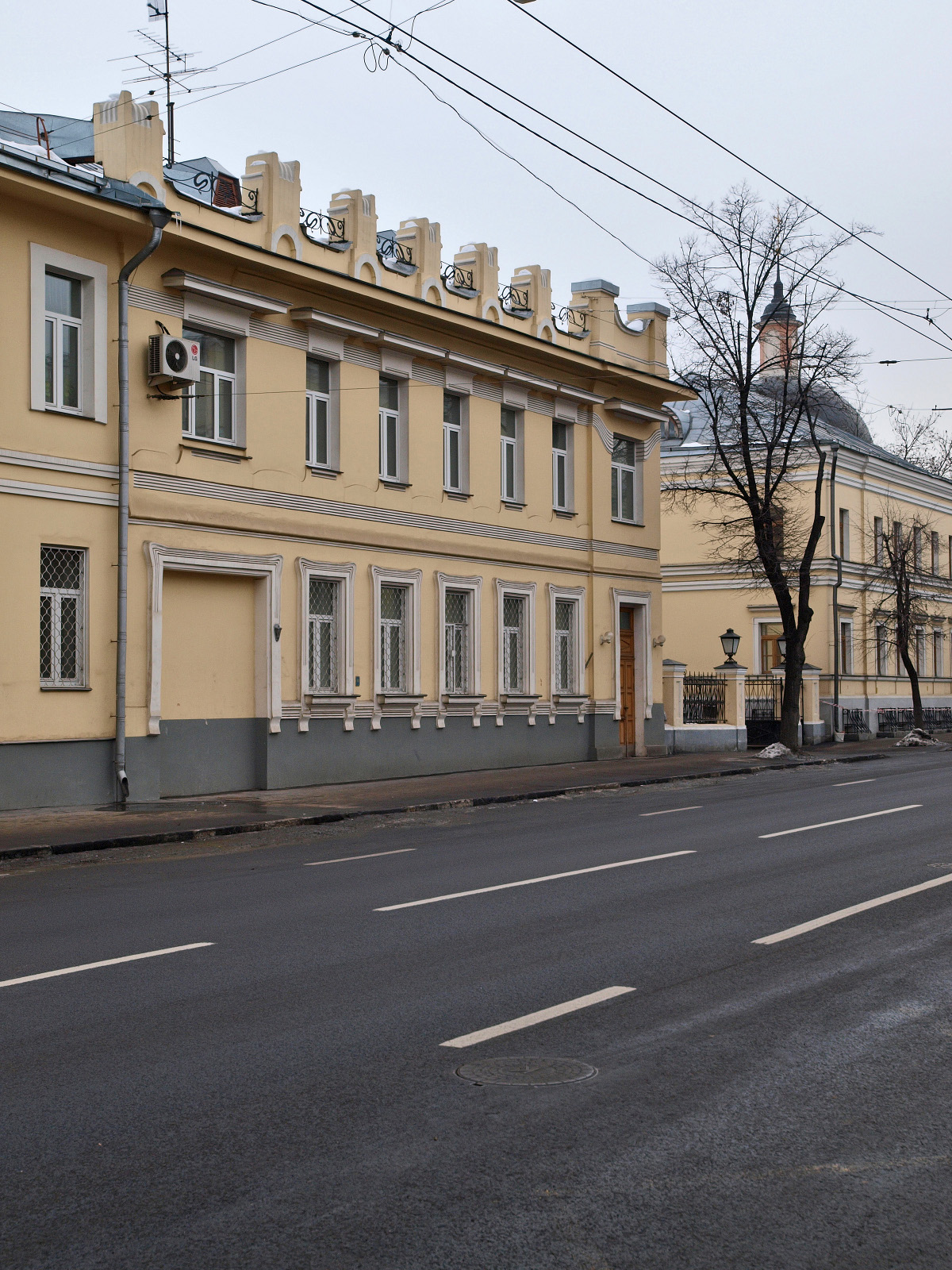
Embassy in Moscow

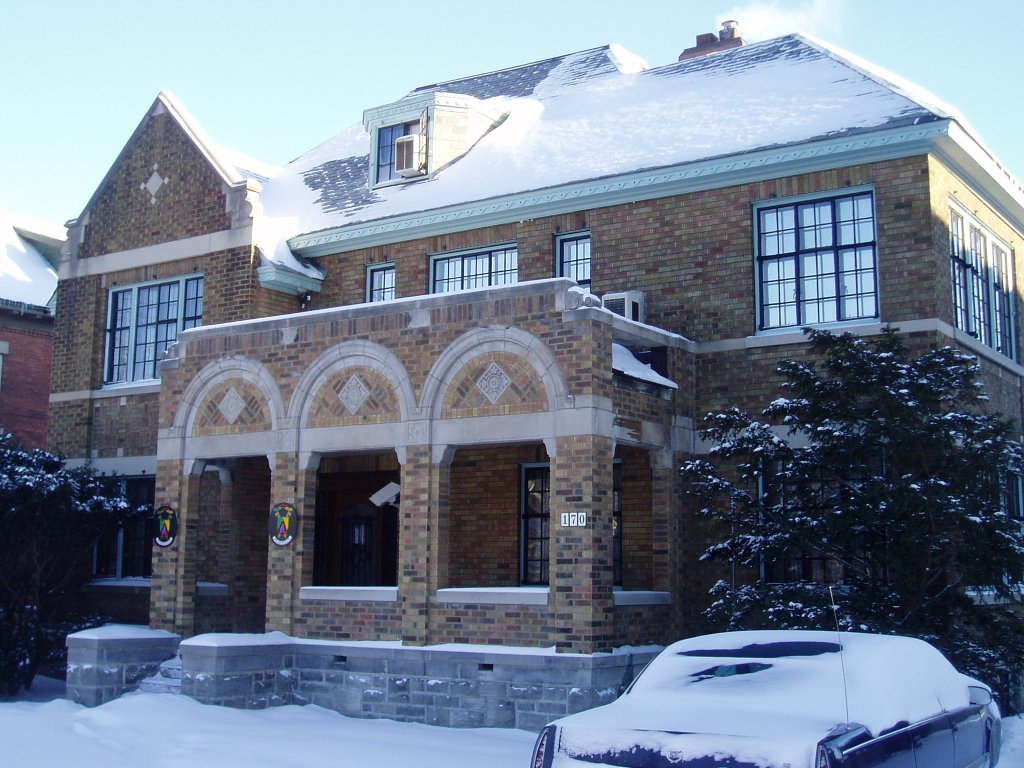
High Commission in Ottawa

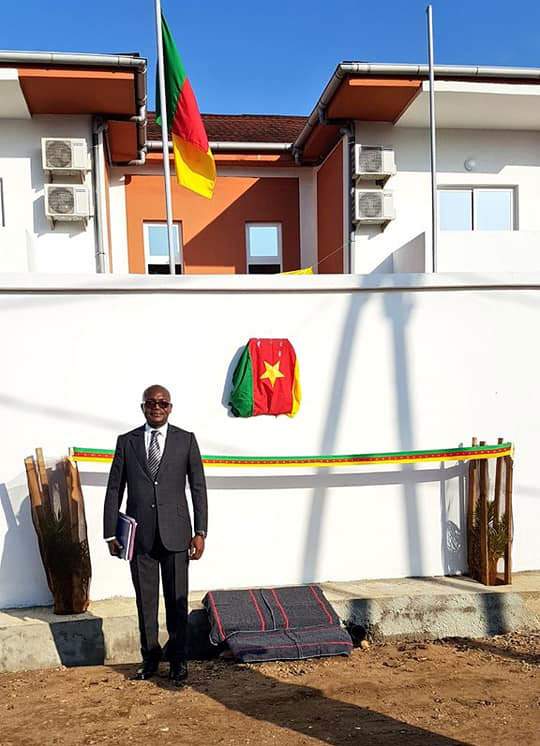
Consulate in Ouesso

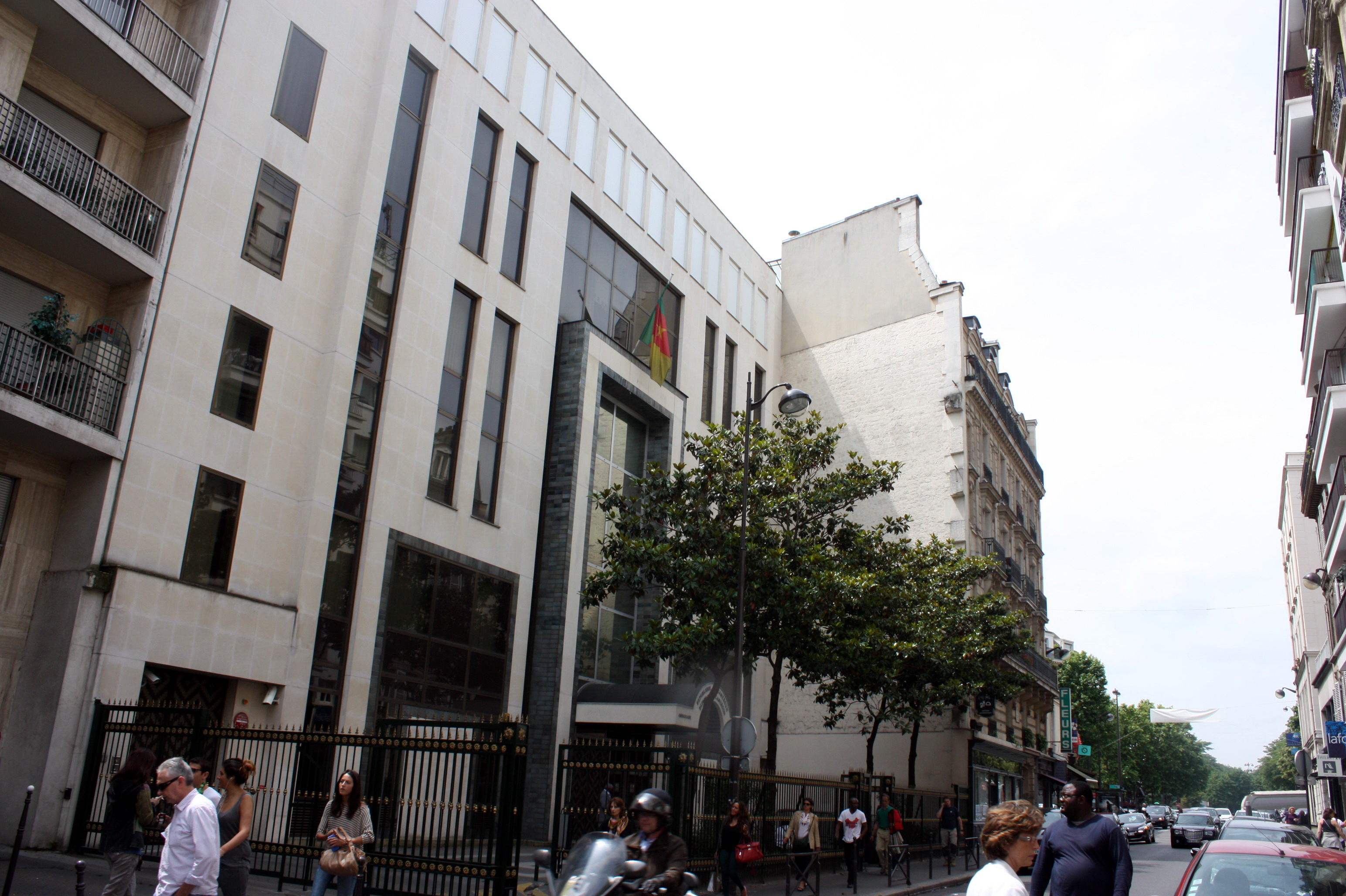
Embassy in Paris

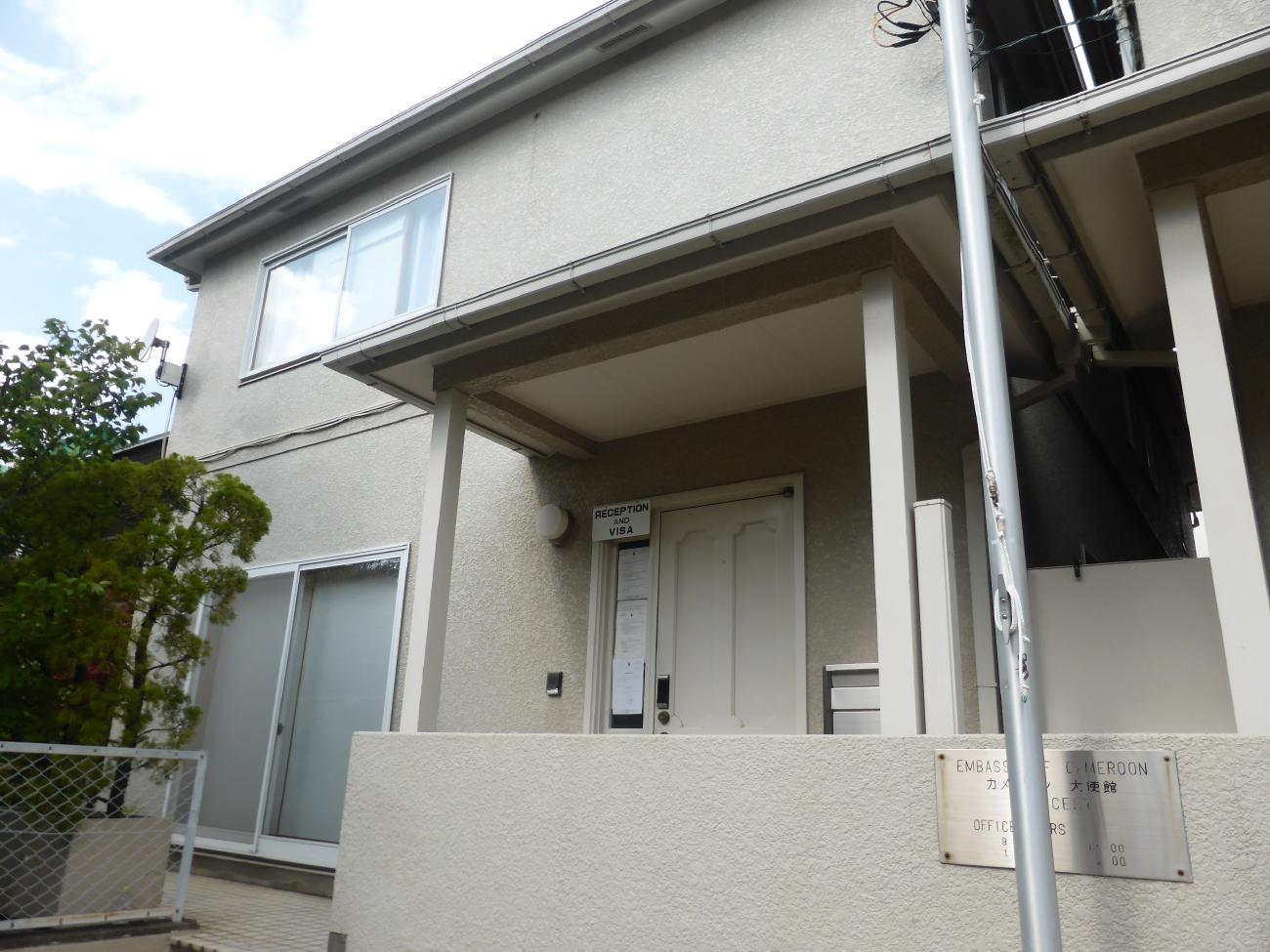
Embassy in Tokyo

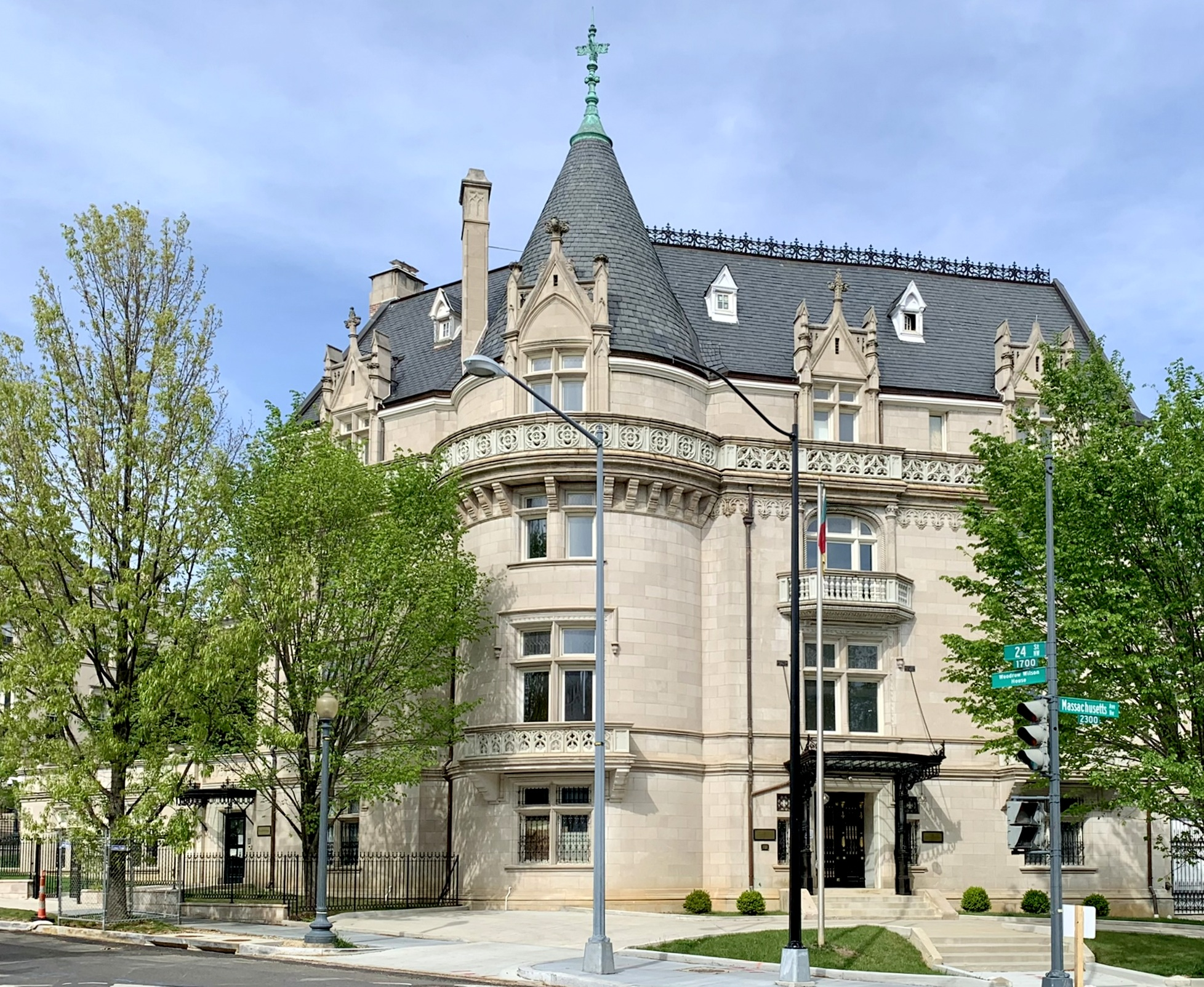
Embassy in Washington, D.C.

== See also ==
- Foreign relations of Cameroon
- List of diplomatic missions in Cameroon
- Visa policy of Cameroon
