= IRIC =

IRIC may refer to:

- Institut de recherche en immunologie et en cancérologie de l’Université de Montréal
- International Relations Institute of Cameroon
