= Dominique Awono Essama =

Cameroonian diplomat

Dominique Awono Essama is a Cameroonian diplomat who has been Cameroon's Ambassador to Italy since 2008. Awono Essama graduated from the International Relations Institute of Cameroon (IRIC) and held a post at Cameroon's Embassy to the Netherlands before being moved to a post at the Embassy to the Democratic Republic of the Congo. He was Head of State Protocol for ten years before President Paul Biya appointed him as Ambassador to Italy to replace Michael Kima Tabong on 9 June 2008. He presented his credentials to Italian President Giorgio Napolitano on 21 January 2009. Awono Essama was additionally accredited as Permanent Representative to the Food and Agriculture Organization (FAO), based in Rome, on 21 November 2009.

== See also ==
- List of diplomatic missions of Cameroon
- Politics of Cameroon
