= Owono =

Owono is a surname. Notable people with the surname include:

- François Engongah Owono (born 1945), Gabonese politician
- Jesús Owono (born 2001), Equatoguinean footballer
- Joseph Owono (1921–1981), Cameroonian writer and diplomat
- Julie Owono (born c. 1987), French and Cameroonian lawyer
