= Embassy of Cameroon, Washington, D.C. =

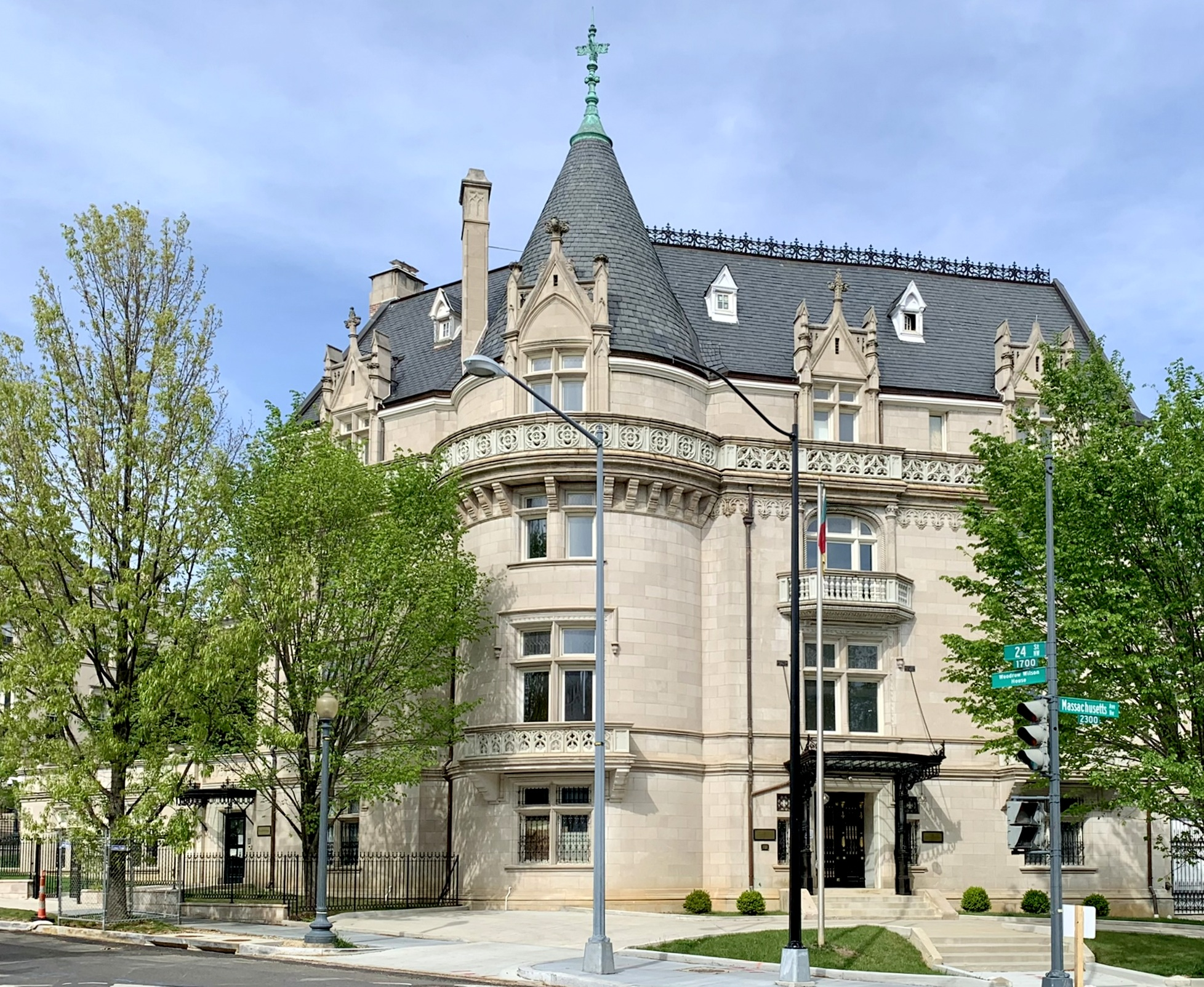
- Embassy of Cameroon in 2022
- Location: Washington, D.C.
- Address: 2349 Massachusetts Ave, N.W.
- Coordinates: 38°54′49.5″N 77°3′8.3″W

The Residence of the Embassy of Cameroon in Washington, D.C., also known as the Christian Hauge House, is the official residence of the Ambassador of the Republic of Cameroon to the United States. In 2009, the Embassy vacated the building temporarily to allow for a major renovation of the property, and relocated for the meantime to 1700 Wisconsin Ave, N.W., then to its current location at 3400 International Drive N.W.

The current ambassador of Cameroon to the United States is Mr. Henri Étoundi Essomba, who was appointed by the president of the Republic of Cameroon on April 11, 2016 to replace the previous ambassador, Joseph Bienvenu Charles Foe-Atangana. Prior to his appointment, Étoundi Essomba was Cameroon's ambassador to Israel.

== Building ==
Construction of the Christian Hauge House began in 1906 and was designed by George Oakley Totten Jr. The house was commissioned by Hauge, a diplomat from Norway. Hauge died in 1907, never seeing his mansion completed. His wife lived in the house until 1927.

== See also ==
- List of diplomatic missions of Cameroon
- Cameroon-United States relations
- Foreign relations of Cameroon
- List of Washington, D.C. embassies
