= Cameroon–Spain relations =

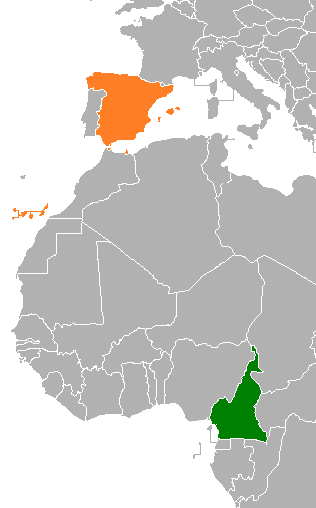
- Cameroon: Spain

Cameroon–Spain relations are the bilateral and diplomatic relations between these two countries. Cameroon has an embassy in Madrid. Spain has an embassy in Yaoundé.

== Diplomatic relations ==
The Spanish embassy in Yaoundé was opened more than 50 years ago, and since then their relations have been deepening in different fields. Political relations between the two countries were concretized in a Memorandum of Understanding Regarding Political Consultations (Spanish: Memorando de Entendimiento en materia de consultas políticas) in April 2009 which was signed by both foreign ministers during a Cameroonian Ministry of Affairs' visit to Madrid.

Subsequently, two bilateral agreements have been signed:

- Convention to combat crime (January 2011)
- Air cooperation agreement (November 2012)

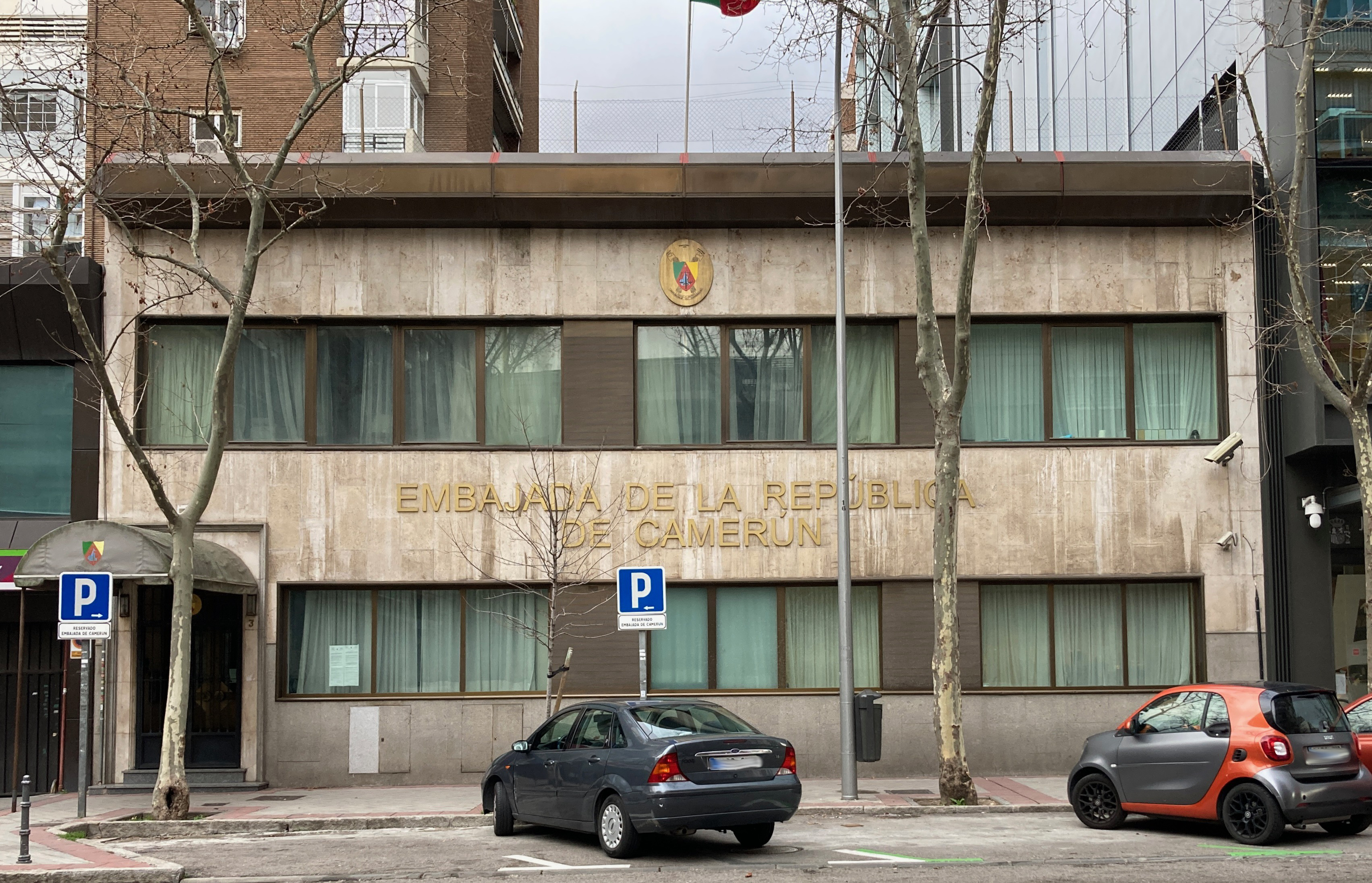
Embassy of Cameroon, Madrid

Spain continues to show its willingness to participate actively in the strengthening of security in the Gulf of Guinea, both at a general level of the UN and the EU, through the Commission's Program of Critical Maritime Routes. On a bilateral level since 2011 they exercised with the Cameroonian navy patrolmen. Used were Spanish boat Centinela, (17 to 24 March 2011) Cazadora, (31 October to 3 November) Vencedora, (March 6 to 9 2012)Relámpago (January 6 to 8 2013), and Infanta Elena (29 March to 2 April 2014).

== Economic relations ==
The trade balance has traditionally been deficient for Spain because Cameroon is a major supplier of hydrocarbons. Cameroon is the 61st largest provider country for Spain. The negative balance has been offset in recent years by the contraction and subsequent shrinking of Spanish domestic demand. However, demand can be seen rebounding in the 2014 advanced data: about 400 or 500 million deficits per year.

The outlook may change if the price of crude remains at the end of 2014 levels. Being the main product imported by Spain, a sustained decline in the price of oil can lower the import bill.

== Cooperation ==
Cameroon is not a priority country in the Spanish Cooperation Master Plan, so there is no Technical Cooperation Office (TBT) in the country. Until 2012, the Open and Permanent Call (CAP) of AECID and the ordinary and extraordinary call for grants for NGOs have been the two main instruments for development cooperation in Cameroon.

The most important part of development cooperation is carried out by religious congregations, especially in health and education, and more recently by several NGOs. Both sometimes receive assistance from the Central Administration and in particular from the Autonomies and the local Administration. A Spanish Red Cross project for Chadian refugees was completed in 2012 and was financed by the Spanish Agency for International Development Cooperation.

There is currently a project in the same area developed by the NGO Red Deporte y Cooperation with funding from AECID. Casa África continues to enhance the presence of Cameroonians in its programs. Since 2011, this financing has been significantly reduced. The Spanish NGOs based in Cameroon include: Sports and Cooperation Network, Zerca and Far, Globalmón, Medicus Mundi, and Agermanament and CEIBA. Other NGOs fund projects, especially from religious congregations, such as Manos Unidas or PROCLADE.

== Culture ==
The Spanish language is stated to be the "most popular foreign language in Cameroon", despite Germany, France and the United Kingdom being Cameroon's former colonizers.

== See also ==
- Foreign relations of Cameroon
- Foreign relations of Spain
