= Paul Pondi =

Cameroonian politician

Ambassador of Cameroon to the United States
- In office 1960–1961
- President: Ahmadou Ahidjo
- Succeeded by: Charles Okala

Director of National Security
- In office 1962–1972
- President: Ahmadou Ahidjo

Ambassador of Cameroon to China
- In office 1972–1975

Ambassador of Cameroon to the Soviet Union
- In office 1976–1982

Personal details
- Born: Paul Thomas Pondi; February 10, 1928 Cameroon
- Died: August 24, 2013 (aged 85) Yaoundé, Cameroon
- Occupation: Diplomat

Paul Thomas Pondi (10 February 1928 – 31 August 2013) was a Cameroonian political figure. After holding top national security posts from 1960 to 1972, he had a long career as a diplomat.

Pondi was Cameroon's ambassador to the United States from 1982 to 1993 and later served as chairman of the board of the Cameroon Civil Aviation Authority from 2000 to 2010.

== Career ==
Paul Pondi was born in Ngog Bassong, a commune within Ngog-Mapubi. He was Deputy Director-General of National Security from January 1960 to 1962 and became Director-General of National Security in 1962. In 1969, he was appointed as Delegate-General for National Security, working under President Ahmadou Ahidjo's direct authority. Accused of "questionable methods", he was dismissed from that post by President Ahidjo on 5 April 1972.

After Pondi was dismissed from his police command, he served as a diplomat. From December 1972 to November 1977, he was Cameroon's ambassador to Zaïre. Ahidjo then appointed him as ambassador to the United Kingdom in 1977, and he presented his credentials on 23 February 1978. He was Ambassador to the United Kingdom until October 1981 and was then appointed by Ahidjo as Ambassador to the United States, presenting his credentials on 13 January 1982. He remained in his post under Ahidjo's successor, Paul Biya. After 11 years in Washington, DC, he became the longest-serving ambassador to the United States and thus obtained the honorary title of Dean of the Diplomatic Corps on 13 January 1993.

On 20 January 1993, Cameroonian opposition leader John Fru Ndi attended the inauguration of US President Bill Clinton; he and his wife Rose were photographed with Clinton and Clinton's wife Hillary, and Fru Ndi's presence at the event had a symbolic impact in Cameroon, giving the impression of recognition and legitimacy in light of Fru Ndi's claim to have defeated Biya in the 1992 presidential election. However, as a matter of protocol, Clinton was also photographed with Paul Pondi on that occasion due to Pondi's status as Dean of the Diplomatic Corps. The government newspaper Cameroon Tribune utilized the photograph of Clinton and Pondi as a counterpoint to the images of Clinton and Fru Ndi.

Pondi left his post as ambassador on 3 September 1993. Later, he was appointed by President Biya as chairman of the board of directors of the Cameroon Civil Aviation Authority (CCAA) in 2000.

Pondi was extensively interviewed by his son, Jean-Emmanuel Pondi, for the book Paul Pondi, le temps de la parole: entretiens, which was published in 2005. A dedication ceremony was held for the book in Yaoundé on 21 September 2005.

In 2010, Pondi left his post as chairman of the board of the CCAA. He died at a Yaounde hospital on 31 August 2013 at the age of 85.
