= Henri Étoundi Essomba =

Cameroonian diplomat (born 1949)

His Excellency Henri Étoundi Essomba
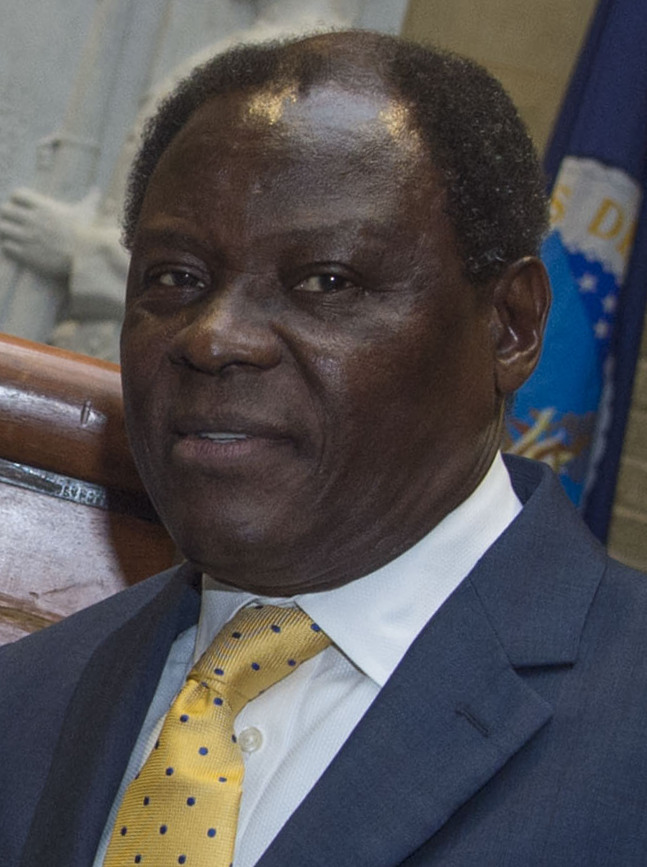

Ambassador of Cameroon to the United States
- Incumbent
- Assumed office April 11, 2016
- President: Paul Biya
- Preceded by: Joseph Bienvenu Charles Foe-Atangana

Ambassador of Cameroon to Israel
- In office 1998–2016

Personal details
- Born: March 2, 1949 (age 77) Yaoundé, Cameroon
- Children: 4
- Occupation: Diplomat
- Profession: Ambassador

Henri Étoundi Essomba (French pronunciation: [ɑ̃ʁʁi etundi esɔ̃ba] born March 2, 1949) (first name spelled Henry) is a Cameroonian diplomat, politician and businessman serving since 2016 as the Cameroon’s Ambassador to the United States. He was appointed by President Paul Biya to replace Joseph Bienvenu Charles Foe-Atangana.

Essomba also served as Cameroonian ambassador to Israel from 1998 to 2016. During his tenure in Tel Aviv, Essomba served as dean of the diplomatic corps.

== Early life and education ==
Henri Étoundi Essomba was born on March 2, 1949, in Yaoundé, Cameroon, where he was offered the opportunity to join the military but refused in order to attend university, studying economics.

Essomba attended university in Cameroon, where he studied economics. Following his graduation, he was offered an chance to pursue doctoral studies in the United States but did not take up the offer due to administrative challenges. He later sat for and passed the entrance examination to Cameroon’s School for Diplomacy. He holds a doctorate degree from the International Relations of Cameroon (IRIC) in Yaounde.

He spent many years in Tel Aviv, where he described his long residence as having shaped his perspective on diplomacy and culture. In a 2015 interview with The Jerusalem Post, he stated, "Sometimes I feel like an Israeli myself... Lack of patience has tainted me. Frequently, I have to remind myself: you’re not an Israeli. You’re a Cameroonian".

Essomba originally intended to enter the priesthood before pursuing a career in diplomacy. After attending seminary school, he decided not to continue religious training and later joined Cameroon’s Ministry of External Relations.

== Career ==
Essomba began a diplomatic career with Cameroon's Ministry of External Relations. After his long stay in Israel, he had postings to Paris, France, and Brasília, Brazil, accruing experience in international representation and protocol.

He was sent to Israel in the early 1990s as chargé d’affaires with the responsibility of opening Cameroon’s chancery and preparing for the coming of the first ambassador. The posting, was to last a few months, but stretched beyond his expectation when no ambassador showed up within that time, and he found himself serving there for about five years. When Israeli Prime Minister Yitzhak Rabin was assassinated in 1995, Essomba was transferred back to Cameroon, where he was appointed deputy chief of protocol at the presidency.

He was later made Cameroon's first ambassador to Israel, and he served in that position for almost twenty years. In Tel Aviv, Essomba became one of the longest-serving foreign envoys in Israel. In 2006, he took up the position of dean of the Diplomatic Corps. He participated in official receptions and state events as dean, and he met with visiting heads of state and government, including Barack Obama during his visit to Israel in 2013.

In 2016, Essomba became the ambassador of Cameroon to the United States, taking over the position from Joseph Bienvenu Charles Foe-Atangana after he was dismissed. While serving in Washington, D.C., he represents Cameroon in relations with U.S. government officials, international organizations, and members of the Cameroonian diaspora.

== Public engagements ==
In September 2017, Essomba appeared live on CRTV-Télé’s Présidence actu program, where he discussed the situation of the Cameroonian diaspora in the United States. He observed that the diaspora was often divided along ethnic and tribal lines and emphasized the importance of strengthening unity among Cameroonians living abroad.

When asked about the Anglophone crisis, Essomba admitted that the issue had also affected members of the diaspora calling for continued dialogue and trust between the government of Cameroon and nationals living abroad. He characterized his first year as ambassador to the United States as a period focused on reaching out to the diaspora, adding that official visits, such as that of President Paul Biya, helped extend cooperation well beyond that initial period.

Essomba also spoke about letters from members of the United States Congress about Cameroon, describing such correspondence as part of the normal oversight role of parliamentarians, and added that the letters have been forwarded to Yaoundé for necessary action.

In August 2024, Essomba called on Cameroonians in the United States to finalize the voter registration process, ahead of 2025 elections . He has also spoken from Washington about topics such as the Anglophone situation, freedom of speech, human rights.

== Personal life ==
Essomba is married to Esther, and they have four children. While he served as Cameroon’s ambassador to Israel, his family lived with him in Jerusalem, and his wife studied at Tel Aviv University.

He speaks both French and English, the official languages of Cameroon, and is reported to have some knowledge of Hebrew acquired during his diplomatic service in Israel.

Essomba is a fan of both basketball and soccer and used to play basketball at the Herzliya Country Club. During that time, the city’s mayor, mistaking him for an American, invited him to join the Herzliya basketball team.

Political offices
Preceded by Joseph Bienvenu Charles Foe-Atangana	Ambassador of Cameroon to the United States; September 12, 2008 – September 17, 2008	Succeeded by –
