= List of diplomatic missions in Cameroon =

This is a list of diplomatic missions in Cameroon. The capital Yaoundé currently hosts 38 embassies/high commissions. Douala, the largest city and main economic center, hosts 8 consular missions.

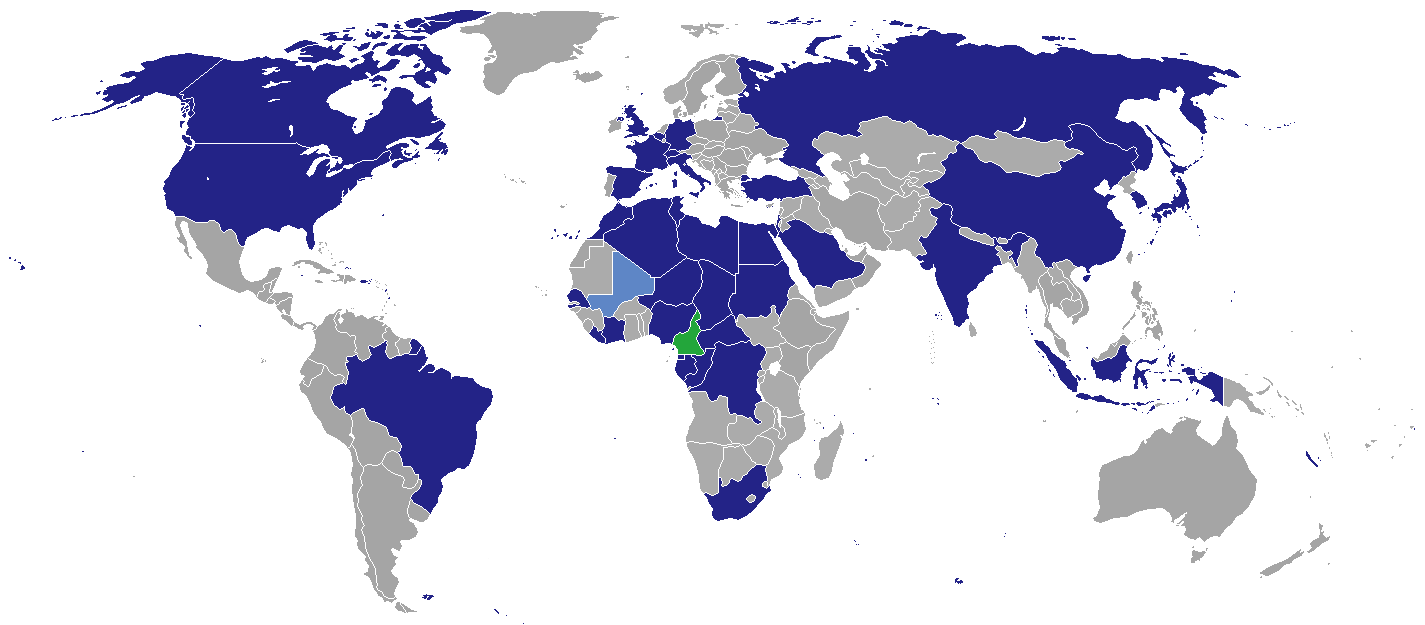
Diplomatic missions in Cameroon

== Diplomatic missions in Yaoundé ==
=== Embassies and High Commissions ===
1. Algeria
2. Belgium
3. Brazil
4. Canada
5. Central African Republic
6. Chad
7. China
8. Congo-Brazzaville
9. Congo-Kinshasa
10. Egypt
11. Equatorial Guinea
12. France
13. Gabon
14. Germany
15. Holy See
16. India
17. Indonesia
18. Israel
19. Italy
20. Ivory Coast
21. Japan
22. Liberia
23. Libya
24. Morocco
25. Niger
26. Nigeria
27. Russia
28. Saudi Arabia
29. Senegal
30. South Africa
31. South Korea
32. Sovereign Military Order of Malta
33. Spain
34. Switzerland
35. Tunisia
36. Turkey
37. United Kingdom
38. United States

=== Other missions or delegations ===
1. European Union (Delegation)

=== Gallery ===
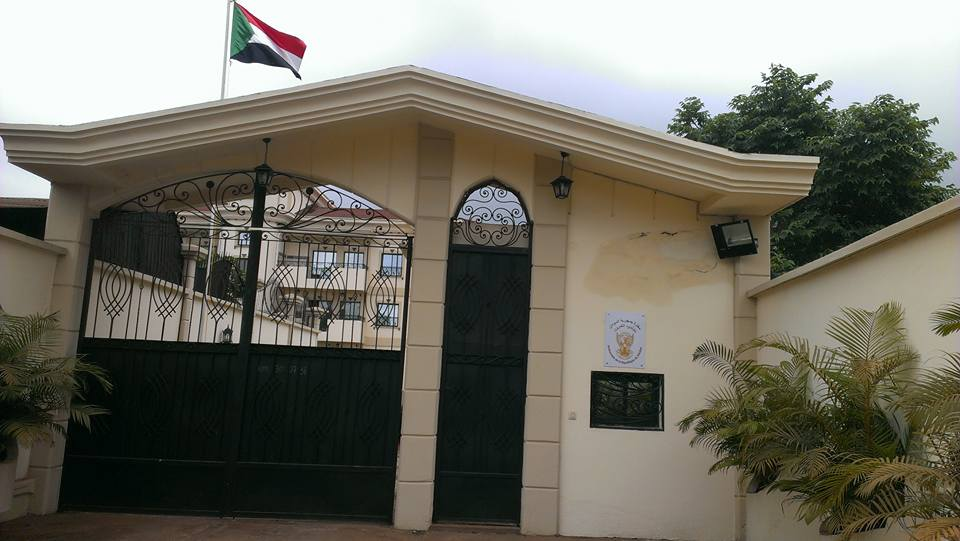
Embassy of Sudan

== Consular Missions ==
=== Douala ===
- Central African Republic (Consulate)
- Chad (Consulate-General)
- Congo-Brazzaville (Consulate-General)
- Equatorial Guinea (Consulate)
- France (Consulate-General)
- Mali (Consulate-General)
- Nigeria (Consulate-General)
- United States (Embassy branch office)

=== Buea ===
- Nigeria (Consulate-General)

=== Garoua ===
- Central African Republic (Consulate)
- Chad (Consulate)

=== Ebolowa ===
- Equatorial Guinea (Consulate-General)

== Embassies to open ==
- Cuba
- Ukraine

== Non-resident embassies and high commissions accredited to Cameroon ==
Resident in Abuja, Nigeria:

- Argentina
- Australia
- Austria
- Benin
- Czech Republic
- Denmark
- Finland
- Greece
- Hungary
- Ireland
- Iraq
- Malaysia
- Mexico
- Norway
- Portugal
- Philippines
- Pakistan
- Poland
- Romania
- Sierra Leone
- Syria
- Slovakia
- Thailand
- Trinidad & Tobago
- Ukraine
- United Arab Emirates

Resident in Kinshasa, Congo-Kinshasa:

- Kenya
- Sweden
- Tanzania
- Uganda
- Zambia

Resident elsewhere

- Angola (Libreville)
- Bangladesh (Algiers)
- Croatia (Rabat)
- Cuba (Brazzaville)
- Ethiopia (Abidjan)
- Iran (Abidjan)
- Jordan (Nairobi)
- Lebanon (Abuja/Libreville)
- Madagascar (Addis Ababa)
- Malawi (Addis Ababa)
- Mali (Libreville)
- Maldives (Riyadh)
- Netherlands (Cotonou)
- New Zealand (Addis Ababa)
- Panama (Havana)
- Paraguay (Cairo)
- Serbia (New York City)
- Seychelles (Addis Ababa)
- Venezuela (Malabo)
- Vietnam (Algiers)

== Closed missions ==
Host city	Sending country	Mission	Year closed	Ref.
Yaoundé	Greece	Embassy (Note: Resident in Abuja, Nigeria)	2009	
Yaoundé	Netherlands	Embassy (Note: Resident in Cotonou, Benin)	2011	
Yaoundé	North Korea	Embassy	1995	
Yaoundé	Polish People's Republic	Embassy	1981	
	Sudan	Embassy	2021	
Douala	United Kingdom	Consulate-General	2005	
Douala	China	Consulate General	2017	
Garoua	France	Consulate	2009	

== See also ==
- Foreign relations of Cameroon
- List of diplomatic missions of Cameroon
- Visa requirements for Cameroonian citizens
