= Foreign relations of Cameroon =

Cameroon's noncontentious, low-profile approach to foreign relations puts it squarely in the middle of other African and developing country states on major issues. It supports the principles of non-interference in the affairs of developing countries and increased assistance to underdeveloped countries. Cameroon is an active participant in the United Nations, where its voting record demonstrates its commitment to causes that include international peacekeeping, the rule of law, environmental protection, and Third World economic development. In the UN and other human rights fora, Cameroon's non-confrontational approach has generally led it to avoid criticizing other countries.

Cameroon enjoys good relations with France, the United States and other developed countries. Cameroon enjoys generally good relations with its African neighbors. It supports UN peacekeeping activities in Central Africa.

== International disputes ==
Delimitation of international boundaries in the vicinity of Lake Chad, the lack of which led to border incidents in the past, is complete and awaits ratification by Cameroon, Chad, Niger, and Nigeria; dispute with Nigeria over land and maritime boundaries around the Bakasi Peninsula and Lake Chad is currently before the International Court of Justice (ICJ), as is a dispute with Equatorial Guinea over the exclusive maritime economic zone. As of 10 October 2012, it has been resolved that Cameroon own Bakassi.

Cameroon also faces a complaint filed with the African Commission on Human Rights by the Southern Cameroons National Council (SCNC) and the Southern Cameroons Peoples Organization (SCAPO) against the Government of the Republic of Cameroon, in which the complainants allege that the Republic of Cameroon is illegally occupying the territory of Southern Cameroons. The SCNC and SCAPO ultimately seek the independence of the territory of Southern Cameroons. As of 2008, both parties have submitted briefs and responded to the Human Rights Commissions' inquiries. A ruling by the African Commission on Human Rights is awaited.

== Diplomatic relations ==
List of countries which Cameroon maintains diplomatic relations with:

#	Country	Date
1	France	1 January 1960
2	Germany	1 January 1960
3	Japan	1 January 1960
4	United States	1 January 1960
5	United Kingdom	1 February 1960
6	Lebanon	8 June 1960
7	Israel	15 September 1960
8	Liberia	23 November 1960
9	Nigeria	November 1960
10	Burkina Faso	1960
11	Central African Republic	1960
12	Denmark	1960
13	Mauritania	1960
14	Senegal	1960
15	Egypt	7 January 1961
16	Tunisia	18 February 1961
17	South Korea	10 August 1961
18	Switzerland	9 November 1961
19	Spain	10 November 1961
20	Netherlands	2 December 1961
21	Canada	7 December 1961
22	Philippines	11 December 1961
23	Italy	28 February 1962
24	Belgium	14 March 1962
25	Luxembourg	7 June 1962
26	Turkey	11 October 1962
27	Mali	13 October 1962
28	Ivory Coast	26 November 1962
29	Republic of the Congo	29 November 1962
30	Chad	1962
31	Pakistan	1962
32	Gabon	1 February 1963
33	India	4 April 1963
34	Sudan	12 July 1963
35	Ethiopia	9 August 1963
36	Ghana	20 August 1963
37	Guinea	13 September 1963
38	Algeria	1 January 1964
39	Finland	17 January 1964
40	Russia	18 February 1964
41	Chile	11 August 1964
42	Syria	29 November 1964
43	Norway	15 June 1965
44	Democratic Republic of Congo	21 June 1965
45	Thailand	20 July 1965
46	Morocco	13 August 1965
47	Sweden	24 September 1965
48	Serbia	12 December 1965
49	Gambia	1965
—	Holy See	27 August 1966
50	Saudi Arabia	6 October 1966
51	Austria	29 March 1968
52	Equatorial Guinea	27 October 1968
53	Lesotho	29 October 1968
54	Libya	3 August 1969
55	Romania	14 May 1970
56	China	26 March 1971
57	North Korea	3 March 1972
58	Poland	14 March 1972
59	Zambia	21 April 1972
60	Vietnam	30 August 1972
61	Tanzania	August 1972
62	Uganda	August 1972
63	Kenya	5 September 1972
64	Cambodia	13 October 1972
65	Benin	5 March 1973
66	Greece	28 April 1973
67	Albania	20 August 1973
68	Niger	13 February 1974
69	Rwanda	11 March 1974
70	Costa Rica	3 April 1974
71	Cuba	31 August 1974
72	Malawi	10 September 1974
73	Cyprus	1974
74	Argentina	2 January 1975
75	United Arab Emirates	24 February 1975
76	Qatar	26 February 1975
77	Bahrain	27 February 1975
78	Iran	10 March 1975
79	São Tomé and Príncipe	14 July 1975
80	Kuwait	22 September 1975
81	Mozambique	9 December 1975
82	Mexico	23 December 1975
83	Iraq	1975
84	Sierra Leone	30 September 1976
85	Trinidad and Tobago	19 December 1976
86	Brazil	1976
87	Portugal	12 February 1977
88	Djibouti	22 January 1978
89	Angola	21 August 1979
90	Burundi	1 August 1980
91	Haiti	11 January 1981
92	Vanuatu	1 November 1981
93	Bulgaria	24 February 1984
94	Panama	14 August 1984
95	Hungary	21 January 1987
96	Colombia	8 March 1989
97	Namibia	10 July 1990
98	Czech Republic	27 September 1990
99	Zimbabwe	28 February 1991
100	Malaysia	1 March 1991
101	Venezuela	25 June 1991
102	Jamaica	26 September 1991
103	Singapore	30 September 1991
104	Bahamas	4 October 1991
105	Indonesia	16 June 1992
106	Guatemala	14 April 1993
107	Ukraine	21 October 1993
108	Slovakia	15 November 1993
109	Paraguay	3 December 1993
110	South Africa	29 April 1994
111	Azerbaijan	24 September 1995
112	Slovenia	29 September 1998
113	Oman	30 November 1998
114	North Macedonia	6 April 2001
115	Australia	2 March 2002
116	Croatia	18 October 2002
117	Timor-Leste	20 May 2003
118	Malta	27 January 2006
119	Tajikistan	3 March 2006
120	Estonia	27 July 2006
121	Belarus	14 November 2006
122	Ireland	23 April 2007
123	Armenia	28 May 2007
124	Iceland	19 September 2007
125	Kazakhstan	14 May 2009
126	Bosnia and Herzegovina	10 September 2009
127	Peru	13 July 2010
128	Andorra	21 October 2010
129	Lithuania	16 September 2013
130	Georgia	26 September 2013
131	Mongolia	2 April 2015
132	Latvia	16 April 2015
133	Uruguay	18 December 2017
134	Moldova	27 March 2019
135	Kyrgyzstan	27 September 2019
136	Nicaragua	1 November 2019
137	Saint Kitts and Nevis	9 June 2021
138	Bangladesh	6 December 2022
139	Nepal	22 June 2023
140	Seychelles	11 February 2026
141	New Zealand	Unknown

== Bilateral relations ==
Country	Formal Relations Began	Notes
Australia	2 March 2002	Both countries established diplomatic relations on 2 March 2002: Both countries are full members of The Commonwealth.; Cameroon is accredited to Australia through its embassy in Tokyo, Japan.; Australia is represented in Cameroon through its High Commission in Abuja, Nigeria.
Canada	7 December 1961	Cameroon and Canada have established diplomatic ties on 7 December 1961 with three agreements and four protocoles signed in 1965. Both countries share the use of English and French as the two official languages as well as memberships in the Francophonie and The Commonwealth.: Cameroon has a high commission in Ottawa.; Canada has a high commission in Yaoundé.
Chile	11 August 1964	Both countries established diplomatic relations on 11 August 1964
China	26 March 1971	Both countries established diplomatic relations on 26 March 1971 See also: Cameroon–China relations The People's Republic of China has a number of health and infrastructure projects underway in Cameroon. In January 2007, China signed a series of economic agreements with Cameroon, giving more than $54 million in loans., China constructed the multipurpose sports complex in Yaounde and renovated the famous Amadou Ahidjo stadium.
Cote d'Ivoire	3 September 1962	Both countries established diplomatic relations on 3 September 1962: Cameroon has an embassy in Abidjan.; Côte d'Ivoire has an embassy in Yaounde which also functions as the non-resident embassy to Central African Republic.
France	1 January 1960	Both countries established diplomatic relations on 1 January 1960 Cameroon has particularly close ties with France, with whom it has numerous military, economic, and cultural agreements, the construction of the Bonaberi bridge in Douala is pioneered by the French and they are to exploit uranium discovered in the North by 2018.
Israel	15 September 1960	Both countries established diplomatic relations on 15 September 1960, but relations was broken on 13 October 1973 and re-established diplomatic relations on 26 August 1986 See also: Cameroon–Israel relations Cameroon's Rapid Reaction Force is trained and armed by Israel, and Cameroon supports Israel in the United Nations General Assembly (UNGA) draft resolution votes. Many citizens of Cameroon receive training and education in agriculture in Israel. The Israeli ambassador described Cameroon as Israel's best friend in Africa. Additionally, Cameroon strongly opposes the existence of and antagonizes Palestine and is one of only two nations in Africa not to have yet recognized it
Mexico	22 December 1975	Both countries established diplomatic relations on 22 December 1975: Cameroon is accredited to Mexico from its embassy in Washington, D.C., United States with a consulate in Mexico City.; Mexico is accredited to Cameroon from its embassy in Abuja, Nigeria with a consulate in Yaoundé.
Nigeria	November 1960	Both countries established diplomatic relations in November 1960 See also: Cameroon–Nigeria relations Cameroon is engaged in a sporadic armed conflict with Nigeria in the oil-rich Bakassi Peninsula. The dispute was resolved through the 2006 Greentree Agreement which led to the full withdrawal of Nigerian troops from the region and its administrative transfer back to Cameroon in August 2013. The two countries agree on maritime delimitation.Economic relations between both states are however timid, the uprise of the Boko Haram terrorists group called for military co-operation between Cameroon and Nigeria.
Russia	20 February 1964	Both countries established diplomatic relations on 20 February 1964 See also: Cameroon–Russia relations: Cameroon has an embassy in Moscow.; Russia has an embassy in Yaoundé.
South Korea	10 August 1961	Both countries established diplomatic relations on 10 August 1961. In 2012 Bilateral Trade was US$64 million
Spain	10 November 1961	Both countries established diplomatic relations on 10 November 1961 See also: Cameroon–Spain relations
Turkey	9 August 1963	Both countries established diplomatic relations on 9 August 1963: Cameroon has an embassy in Ankara; Turkey has an embassy in Yaoundé; Trade volume between the two countries was US$205 million in 2019 (Cameroon's exports/imports: 54/151 million USD).; There are direct flights from Istanbul to Yaoundé.
United Kingdom	1 February 1960	See Foreign relations of the United Kingdom Cameroon established diplomatic relations with the United Kingdom on 1 February 1960.: Botswana maintains a high commission in London.; The United Kingdom is accredited to Cameroon through its high commission in Yaoundé.; The UK governed western Cameroon from 1916 to 1961, when it joined the Federal Republic of Cameroon. Both countries share common membership of the Commonwealth, and the World Trade Organization. Bilaterally the two countries have an Economic Partnership Agreement.
United States	1 January 1960	Both countries established diplomatic relations on 1 January 1960 See also: Cameroon–United States relations: Cameroon has an embassy in Washington, D.C.; United States has an embassy in Yaoundé.
Vietnam	30 August 1972	Both countries established diplomatic relations on 30 August 1972. Vietnam is represented in Cameroon through a non-resident embassy in Abuja, Nigeria and an honorary consulate in Douala. In 2014 Nexttel, Joint operative company of Viettel becomes the First 3G operator in Cameroon.

== Multilateral relations ==
In addition to the United Nations, Cameroon is very active in other multilateral organisations or global institutions such as the Organisation internationale de la Francophonie, The Commonwealth, the Organisation of Islamic Cooperation, the Group of 77, the Non-Aligned Movement, the African Union and the Economic Community of Central African States.

== See also ==
- List of diplomatic missions in Cameroon
- List of diplomatic missions of Cameroon
