= Thérèse Kuoh-Moukouri =

Cameroonian feminist and author

Thérèse Kuoh-Moukoury
- Born: February 7, 1938 (age 88); Douala, French Cameroon
- Citizenship: Cameroon
- Occupation: Novelist
- Relatives: Father Jacques Kuoh-Moukouri

Thérèse Kuoh-Moukoury (born 7 February 1938) is a prominent Cameroonian feminist and author. Kuoh-Moukoury was born in 1938 in Douala, Cameroon. Her father was Jacques Kuoh-Moukouri, a prominent Cameroonian writer and diplomat. After primary school in Cameroon, she attended secondary school and higher education in Paris. She served as President of the Union of African and Malagasy Women (Union des Femmes Africaines et Malgaches).

Kuoh-Moukoury is best known for her novel Rencontres essentielles (Essential Encounters 1969) which is one of the earliest novels written by a woman in francophone Africa. It relates the story of Flo, a troubled woman, and her struggles to keep her husband after she is found to be infertile.

Her second novel is awaiting publication and is "based on the life of political martyr Alexandre Douala Manga Bell."

Her 1973 essay "Les couples dominos" ("Domino Couples") tackles the topic of the dynamics of interracial couples. She is also the author of many articles on political activism and feminism in Sub-Saharan Africa.
