= Jacques Kuoh-Moukouri =

Cameroonian writer and ambassador

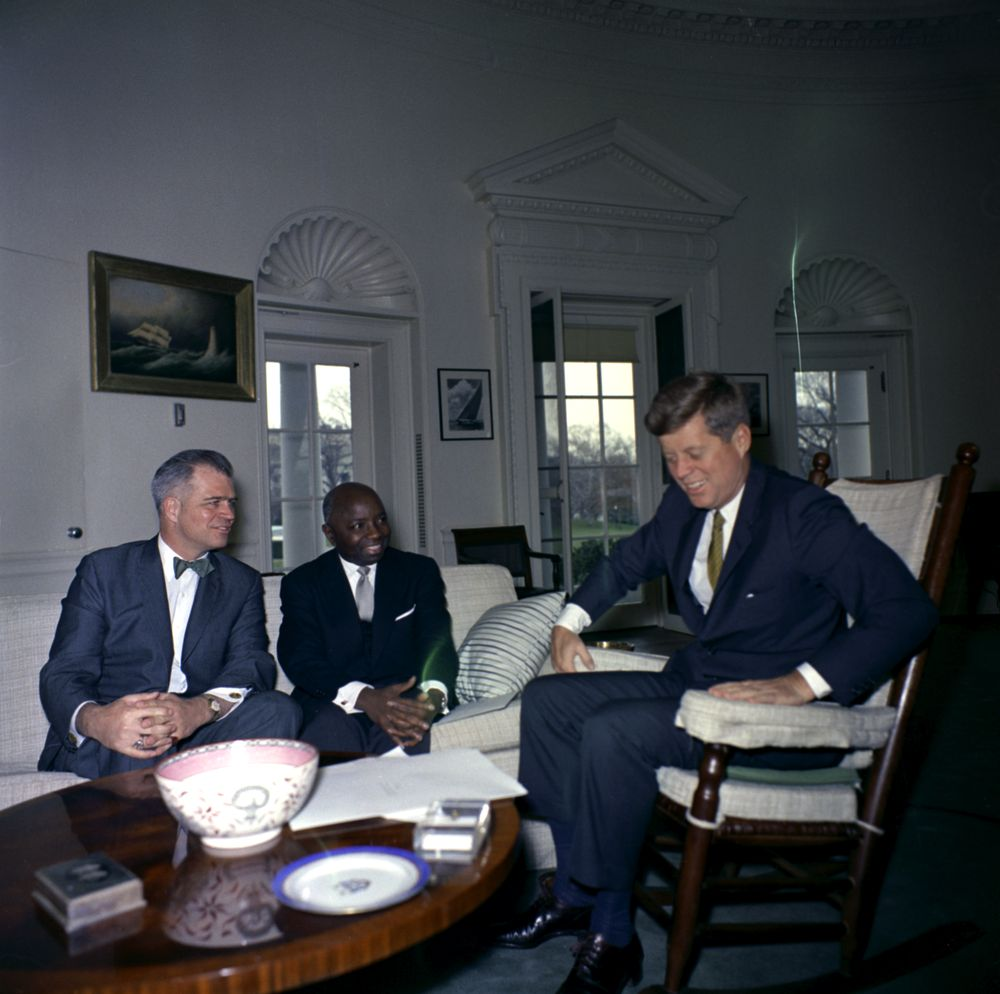
Ambassador Jacques Kuoh-Moukouri meeting with President Kennedy and Assistant Secretary of State for African Affairs G. Mennen Williams, 1962

Jacques Kuoh-Moukouri (1909-2002) was a Cameroonian writer and Cameroon's Ambassador to the United States. He is most well known for his 1963 book Doigts noirs.

He was born in the Akwa, District of Douala on 6 June 1909 and attended secondary school in Yaoundé at the Ecole Supérieure. Kuoh-Moukouri became a leading administrator under the French and spent several years working in Paris. He had eight children including the French feminist and author Thérèse Kuoh-Moukouri. He died on 15 May 2002.
