= Cameroon–Russia relations =

- Cameroon: Russia

Cameroon–Russia relations are the bilateral foreign relations between Cameroon and Russia. Russia has an embassy in Yaoundé, and Cameroon has an embassy in Moscow.

"Joseph Beti Assomo, Cameroon's defence minister, made a discreet but remarkable visit to Moscow to sign a new military cooperation agreement between the two countries. This symbolic trip comes at a time when the Kremlin has relaunched its offensive in Ukraine." "On 12 April [2022], Cameroon and Russia signed a new military cooperation agreement."

== See also ==
- List of ambassadors of Russia to Cameroon
- Foreign relations of Cameroon
- Foreign relations of Russia
