= Joseph Owono =

Cameroonian writer and diplomat

- Owono with his wife in Egypt in the 1960s.

Cameroonian Ambassador to the United States
- In office 1970s–1970s

Personal details
- Born: 1921; Cameroon
- Died: December 17, 2018 (aged 96–97)

Joseph Owono (1921 – December 17, 1981) was a Cameroonian writer and diplomat who served as Cameroonian Ambassador to the United States in the 1970s. His novel Tante Bella (Aunt Bella), published in 1959, was the first novel to be published in Cameroon.
