= Cameroon–United States relations =

- Cameroon: United States

Cameroon–United States relations are international relations between Cameroon and the United States.

== History ==
=== Before independence ===
A U.S. presence in Cameroon predated the independence of French Cameroon in 1960. Since the nineteenth century, Cameroon had attracted American missionaries, some of whom – among them the American Presbyterian Mission and the American Baptist Mission – were influential in establishing education infrastructure in the country. More proximately, the U.S. had established a diplomatic post in Yaoundé in July 1957, with Walter Cutler at the helm. At that stage, the imminence of Cameroonian independence was apparent, and the U.S. sought to position itself for the French withdrawal, counting among its concerns the containment of communist expansion and therefore wishing to monitor the activities of the Union of the Peoples of Cameroon (UPC), a communist civil insurgency. In 1959, the Yaoundé liaison was upgraded to a consulate general, and Ahmadou Ahidjo, independent Cameroon's presumptive leader, visited U.S. President Dwight D. Eisenhower in the White House, while on a trip to the United Nations (UN) General Assembly to muster international support for Cameroonian independence.

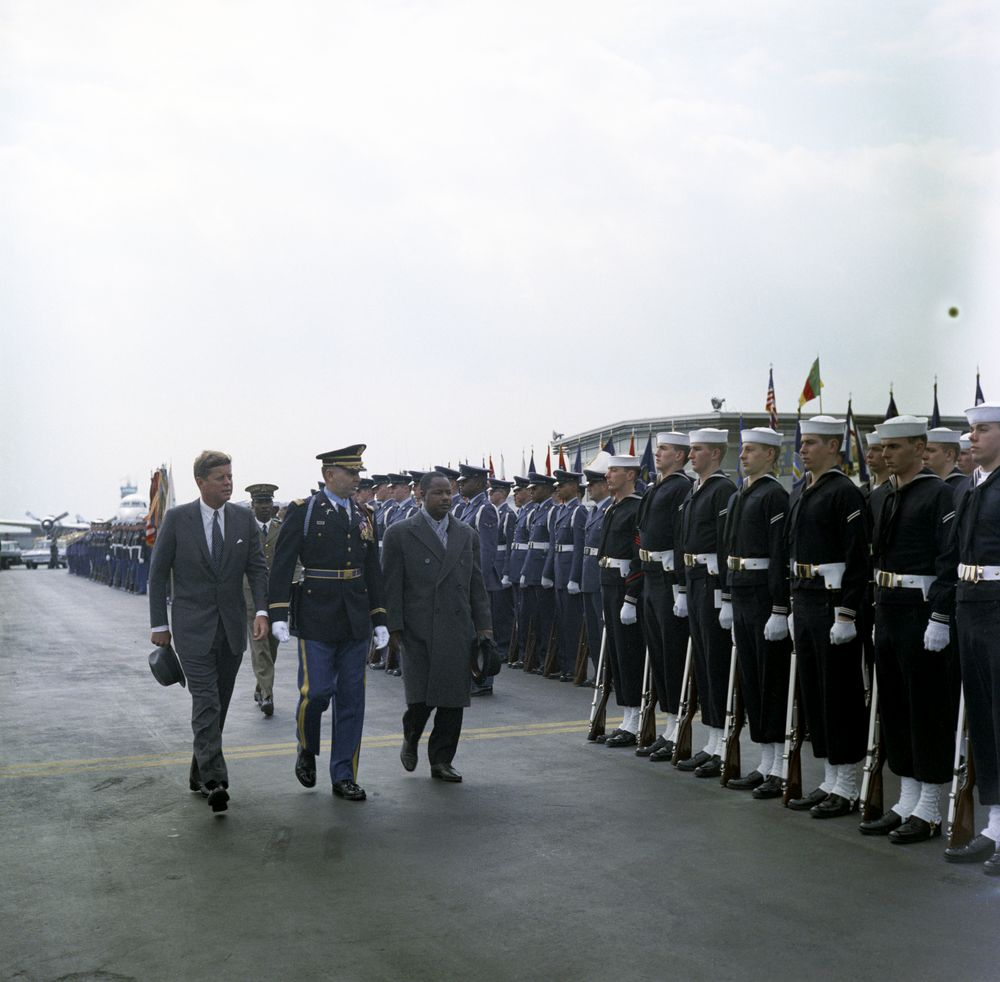
President John F. Kennedy welcomes President Ahmadou Ahidjo, to the U.S. in March 1962.

=== Presidency of Ahmadou Ahidjo (1960–1982) ===
When French Cameroon became independent as the Republic of Cameroon in early 1960, it established formal diplomatic relations with the U.S. In 1961, the U.S. upgraded the Yaoundé consulate to an embassy, later with an outpost in Douala, while Cameroon established an embassy in Washington, D.C., and a permanent mission to the UN in New York. Early bilateral relations, however, were strained: the U.S. declined to support Cameroon's objections to the union of British-administered Northern Cameroons with the new Republic of Nigeria; and Cameroon was offended by the U.S.'s request that it recall its ambassador, Raymond Aimé-N’Thepe, because he was an "anti-white racist" and had "threatened a fencing contractor with a gun". However, in January 1961, Cameroonian President Ahidjo wrote to congratulate John F. Kennedy on his inauguration as U.S. President, expressing hopes for a stronger bilateral relationship, and relations improved considerably after Kennedy received Ahidjo on a five-day official visit in March 1962. In July the next year, U.S. Assistant Secretary of State for African Affairs, Mennen Williams, visited Cameroon to reaffirm the countries' "positive relations". Between 1962 and 1967, Ahidjo visited the U.S. five times, and further visits followed, including in 1969 and 1971. Over the course of his presidency, he was received not only by Kennedy but also by four of his successors, Presidents Lyndon B. Johnson, Richard Nixon, Jimmy Carter, and Ronald Reagan.

Kennedy had hoped not to surpass but to compete with French influence in Africa – and not only in Cameroon itself: because of its geographical location and bilingualism, Cameroon provided a "gateway" to other Central African countries. More practically, during certain periods (1970–1981, and later 1995–2006), the U.S. used Yaoundé as a base for monitoring its interests in Equatorial Guinea. Expanding U.S. influence in Africa was also viewed as a tactic for communist containment and security cooperation in the Cold War, and Ahidjo played up this dimension, alerting Kennedy, during their 1962 meeting, to the subversive communist threat posed by UPC in Cameroon. Ahidjo, for his part, sought to diversify Cameroon's foreign relations, reducing its economic and political dependence on France, its former colonial power: Cameroon was studiously non-aligned in the Cold War, but its strong orientation towards France was apparent, and was occasionally restrictive. Ahidjo was particularly interested in the economic assistance that the U.S. could offer.

Indeed, between 1963 and 1984, American aid to Cameroon amounted to $278.6 million, and was concentrated in infrastructure development, particularly transport infrastructure, and in agriculture. In addition, soon after independence, Cameroon had requested Peace Corps assistance with teaching and training in its underdeveloped education sector. Just two years after the arrival of the first contingent of volunteers in September 1962, in 1964, the Peace Corps's 77 volunteers in West Cameroon made up 30 per cent of the region's secondary teaching personnel.

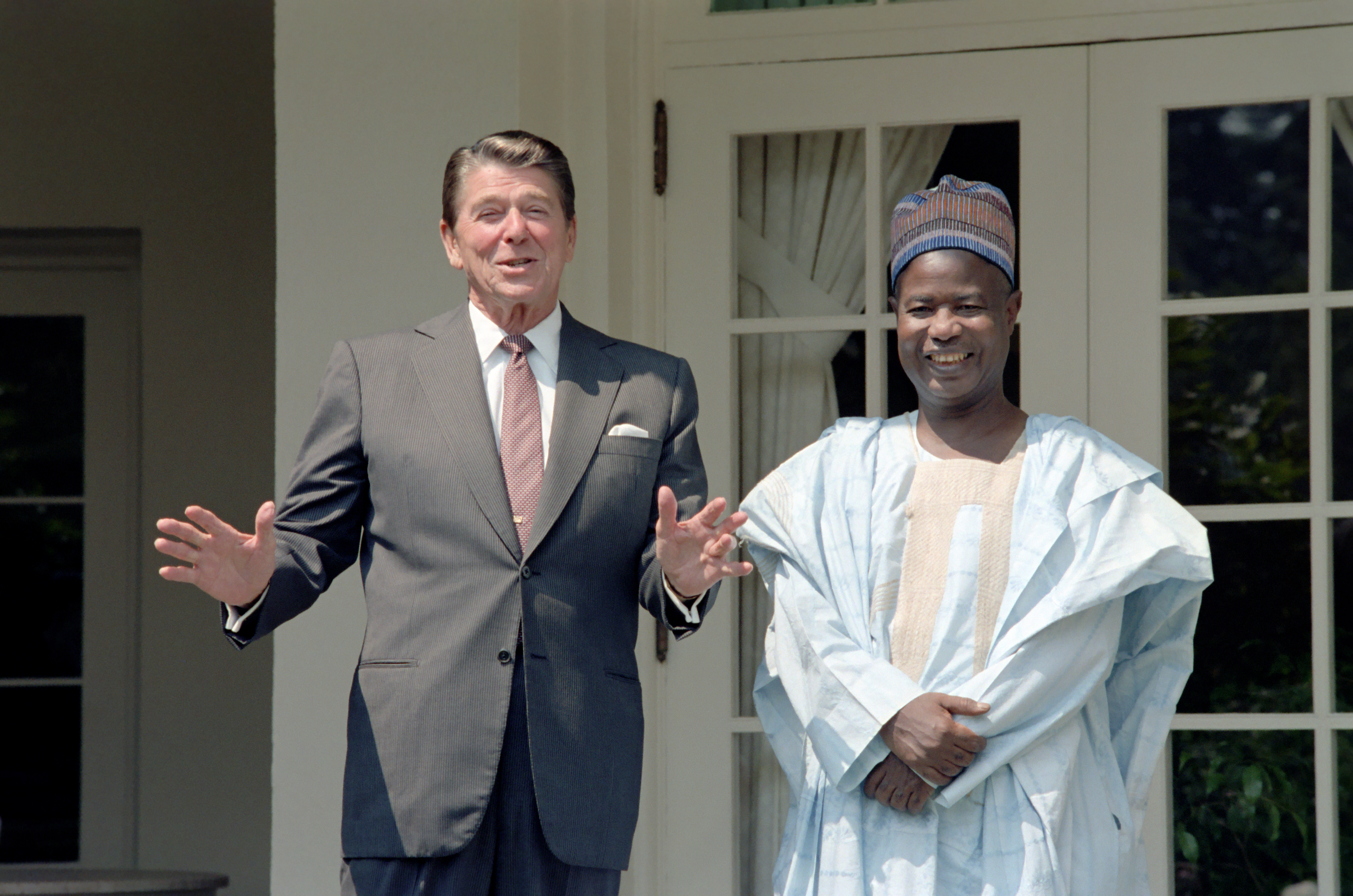
President Ahidjo on a working visit with President Ronald Reagan in the White House Rose Garden, July 1982.

The Peace Corps presence created goodwill towards the U.S. among Cameroonian communities. Kennedy himself, even after his death, was also popular: Cameroonian historian Julius Amin said schools, streets, and children were named after Kennedy, and, "Many hung, in their living rooms, the picture of John Kennedy besides those of important family members." Moreover – although the U.S. located its cultural agencies in Francophone Douala, prioritising political advances with Francophone Africans – even the presence of USAID had symbolic importance for Anglophone Cameroonians, for whom U.S. Agency for International Development offices became an "important cultural centre" as a counterpoint to French cultural domination.

Despite these initiatives, in the 1970s, American aid and trade remained "pathetically minuscule", in both cases dwarfed by the French contribution – between 1966 and 1974, American trade never exceeded 5 per cent of Cameroonian imports or exports. In the 1960s – and afterwards – Cameroonian exports to the U.S. were dominated by raw materials, including petroleum products, cocoa, timber, and rubber.

=== Presidency of Paul Biya (since 1982) ===
However, Cameroon–U.S. economic relations were at their highest ever level in 1982, when Ahidjo was replaced by his prime minister, Paul Biya. Between 1982 and 1984, the U.S. overtook France as Cameroon's foremost export market, primarily due to its consumption of Cameroonian oil. Biya pursued a diversification of Cameroonian foreign relations still more vigorously than Ahidjo had, describing his foreign policy in such terms as "diplomacy of development", "co-operation without frontiers", and "open door" diplomacy.

==== Security cooperation ====
From around 2013, bilateral relations increasingly emphasised joint counterterrorism actions against Boko Haram and Islamic State in West Africa, alongside other regional security initiatives, especially in the Gulf of Guinea. Between 2015 and 2020, about 300 U.S. military personnel were deployed in northern Cameroon to conduct regional intelligence, surveillance, and reconnaissance.

==== Human rights concerns and sanctions ====
According to former Assistant Secretary of State for African Affairs Johnnie Carson, before 2012 – and before the increased emphasis on regional counterterrorism – the U.S.'s Cameroon policy focused on "finding ways to influence the Cameroonian government to adopt political reforms". Over the last five years, increased reports of human rights abuses in Cameroon have revived American interest, and especially congressional interest, in such reforms. The most prominent concern is the ongoing Anglophone Crisis in Cameroon, and the concern that Biya's administration may be diverting U.S. security assistance to support a repressive state response.

In February 2019, the U.S. cut military aid to Cameroon by about $17 million in response to video footage of military atrocities against civilians, although U.S. Ambassador Peter Barlerin said that relations between the countries nevertheless remained "excellent". In October, and citing similar human rights concerns, President Donald Trump terminated Cameroon's eligibility for preferential trade benefits under the African Growth and Opportunity Act. The following year, the U.S. State Department designated Cameroon under the Child Soldiers Prevention Act for its recruitment and use of child soldiers – though the Trump administration waived the legal implications for Cameroon's security assistance eligibility, and Cameroon was de-designated in 2021. Most recently, in June 2021, the administration of President Joe Biden announced that it would impose visa restrictions on individuals believed to be obstructing the peaceful resolution of the Anglophone Crisis.

== Current relations ==
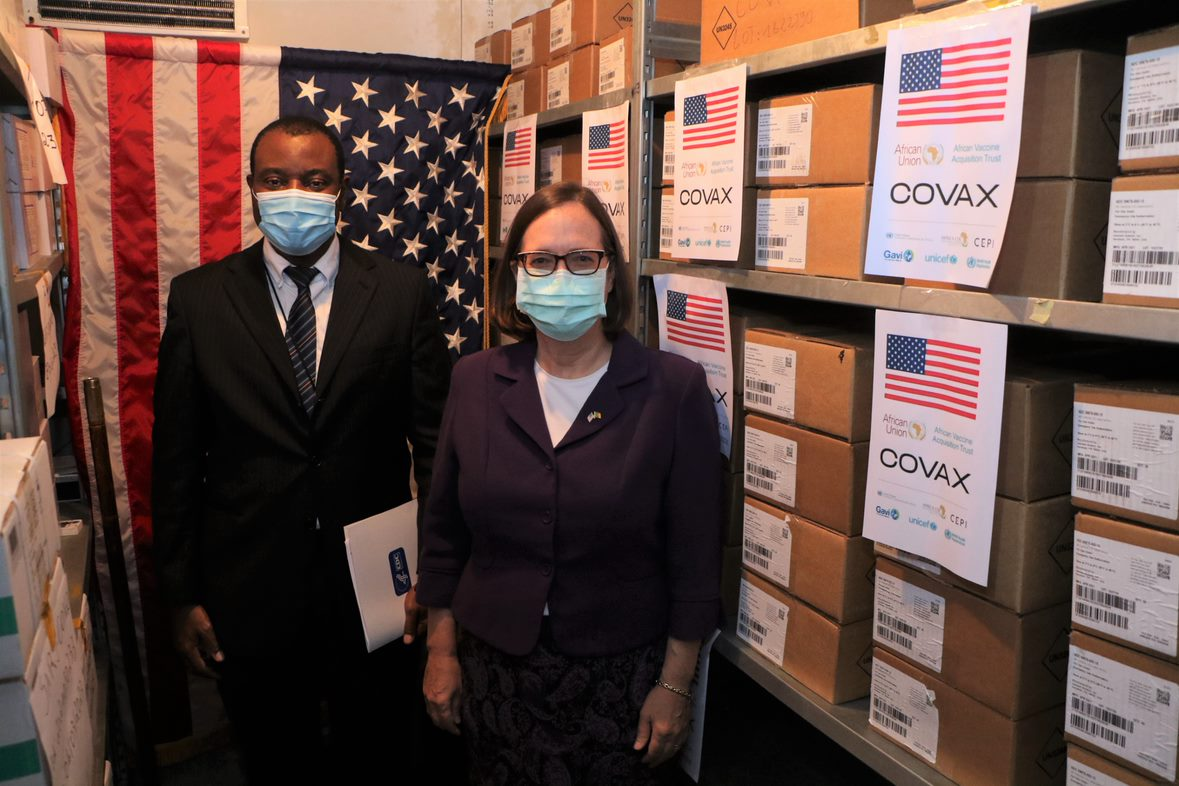
The US donates Janssen COVID-19 vaccines to Cameroon as part of the COVAX initiative in 2021

The relations are close, although they have sometimes been affected by concerns over human rights abuses and the pace of political and economic liberalization. The bilateral United States Agency for International Development (USAID) program in Cameroon closed for budgetary reasons in 1994.

However, approximately 140 Peace Corps volunteers continue to work successfully in agroforestry, community development, education, and health. The Public Affairs section of the U.S. Embassy in Yaoundé organizes and funds diverse cultural, educational, and information exchanges. It maintains a library and helps foster the development of Cameroon's independent press by providing information in a number of areas, including U.S. human rights and democratization policies. The embassy's Self-help and Democracy and Human Rights Funds are some of the largest in Africa.

Through several State Department and USAID regional funds, the embassy also provides funds for refugees, HIV/AIDS, democratization and girl's scholarships. The United States Department of Agriculture (USDA) provided a commodity grant valued at $6 million in 2003 to fund agricultural development projects in the North and Far North provinces. A similar program for $4 million was approved in 2004. The program will fund an agricultural development and nutrition enhancement project in the East and Adamawa provinces.

The United States and Cameroon work together in the United Nations and other multilateral organizations. While in the United Nations Security Council in 2002, Cameroon worked closely with the United States on initiatives. The U.S. Government continues to provide substantial funding for international financial institutions, such as the World Bank, International Monetary Fund, and African Development Bank, that provide financial and other assistance to Cameroon.

On December 18, 2025, Cameroon signed an agreement with the United States over health care assistance. The United States pledged to provide nearly $400 million in aid to Cameroon over the next five years. In return, Cameroon committed to spending up to $450 million in its own health care system during the same time period. This deal was part of a larger effort by the Trump administration to procure bilateral aid agreements that differ from the multilateral approach taken by the World Health Organization and differ from traditional USAID delivery methods. The United States has signed similar deals with 16 other African countries as of March 2026.

=== Immigration ===
As of 2025, immigration remains a sensitive aspect of Cameroon–United States relations. On April 12, 2025, the administration of President Donald Trump announced it would terminate Temporary Protected Status (TPS) for approximately 7,900 Cameroonians, effective June 2025. TPS had allowed Cameroonians already in the U.S. to remain legally due to ongoing conflict in Cameroon, particularly since the Anglophone crisis began in 2017. U.S. lawmakers and refugee advocates condemned the decision, citing continued violence, human rights abuses, and widespread displacement in Cameroon. The move is part of a broader immigration crackdown by the Trump administration during his second term.

== Diplomatic missions ==
The U.S. Embassy in Cameroon is in Yaoundé.

== 2015 American military intervention ==
In October 2015 the US began committing troops to the American military intervention in Cameroon.

== See also ==
- Foreign relations of Cameroon
- Foreign relations of the United States
