= Cameroon–Israel relations =

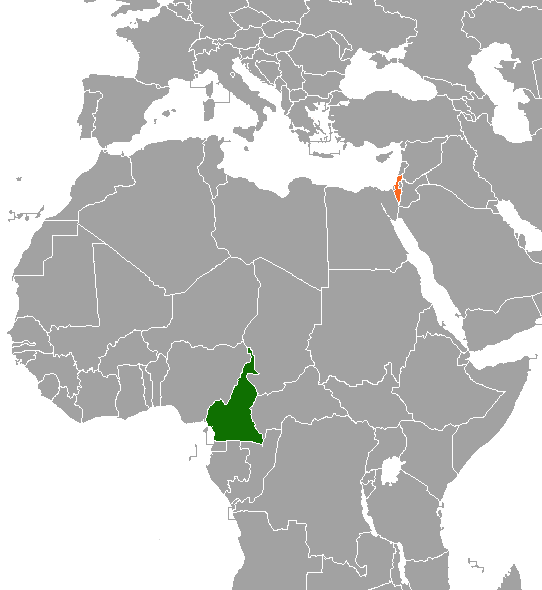
- Cameroon: Israel

Diplomatic mission
- Embassy of Cameroon, Tel Aviv: Embassy of Israel, Yaoundé

Cameroon–Israel relations are relations between the Republic of Cameroon and the State of Israel.

Cameroon voted against several anti-Israel UN resolutions, and was the only nation to join Israel in voting against the UN resolution "Assistance to Palestine Refugees". Along with Eritrea, Cameroon is one of two African states that does not recognize the State of Palestine.

Cameroon cut ties with Israel from 1973 to 1986 and was one of the first states to restore relations. The government of Cameroon uses Israeli armored vehicles, and Cameroon's Rapid Reaction Force, often shortened (by its French name) to BIR, is equipped and trained by Israel.

Students in Cameroon were granted 11 month visas to travel to Israel and learn about agriculture, while poultry farmers underwent training for poultry production in Israel.

Israelis also trained personnel at six hospitals in Cameroon on how to combat the Ebola virus.

Paul Biya, president of Cameroon since 1982, is seen as one of Israel's closest allies in Africa. Israel provides security for President Biya, while Cameroon offers diplomatic support to Israel. Among other expressions of support, Paul Biya offered his "sincere condolences" to Israel following the Hamas attacks of October 7, 2023.
