= Cameroon–China relations =

Bilateral relations between Cameroon and China

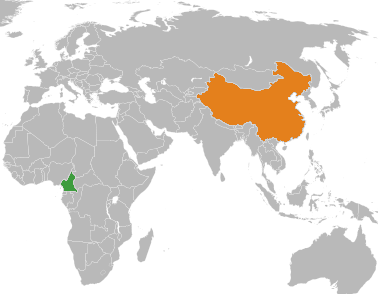
- Cameroon: China

Cameroon and China established bilateral relations on March 26, 1971. Cameroon adheres to the One China Policy.

== Political relations ==
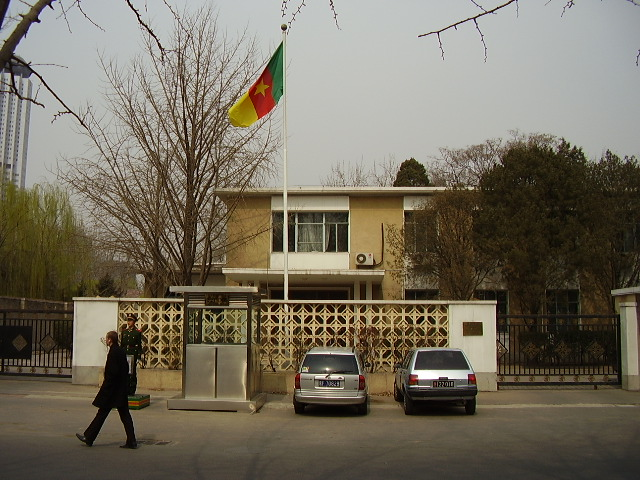
Embassy of Cameroon in China

In the 1960s, China supported armed struggle by the Union des Populations du Cameroon (UPC) against the government of Ahmadou Ahidjo. In 1970, the Ahidjo government defeated the UPC. In 1971, Cameroon established relations with China.

In the 2000s, leading politicians paid state visits to and from each country; these included Cameroonian President Paul Biya's visit for a conference in 2006 and Hu Jintao's visit to Cameroon in 2007.

In the 2000s, some in Cameroon considered the economic relationship to be a form of neo-colonialism; this was mainly due to a perception that Chinese traders flooded the Cameroonian market with cheap but extremely fragile manufactured goods, which stymied the development of local industries.

Chinese Foreign Minister, Wang Yi visited Cameroon on 12 January 2014.

Cameroon was one of 53 countries, that in June 2020, backed the Hong Kong national security law at the United Nations. Cameroon follows the one China principle. It recognizes the People's Republic of China as the sole government of China and Taiwan as an integral part of China's territory, and supports all efforts by the PRC to "achieve national reunification". It also considers Hong Kong, Xinjiang and Tibet to be China's internal affairs.

== Economic relations ==
Since the first Forum on China Africa Cooperation in 2000, Beijing has successfully delivered $2.4 billion in development finance to Cameroon. $87 million of that total falls under the OECD-DAC criteria for Official Development Assistance. Major projects executed by the Chinese government in Cameroon include:

- Construction of the Kribi Deep Seaport funded by a FCFA 207,270 billion loan from the Exim Bank of China
- A FCFA 243 billion loan from China Exim bank for construction of the Memve'ele hydroelectric Dam in Nyabizan

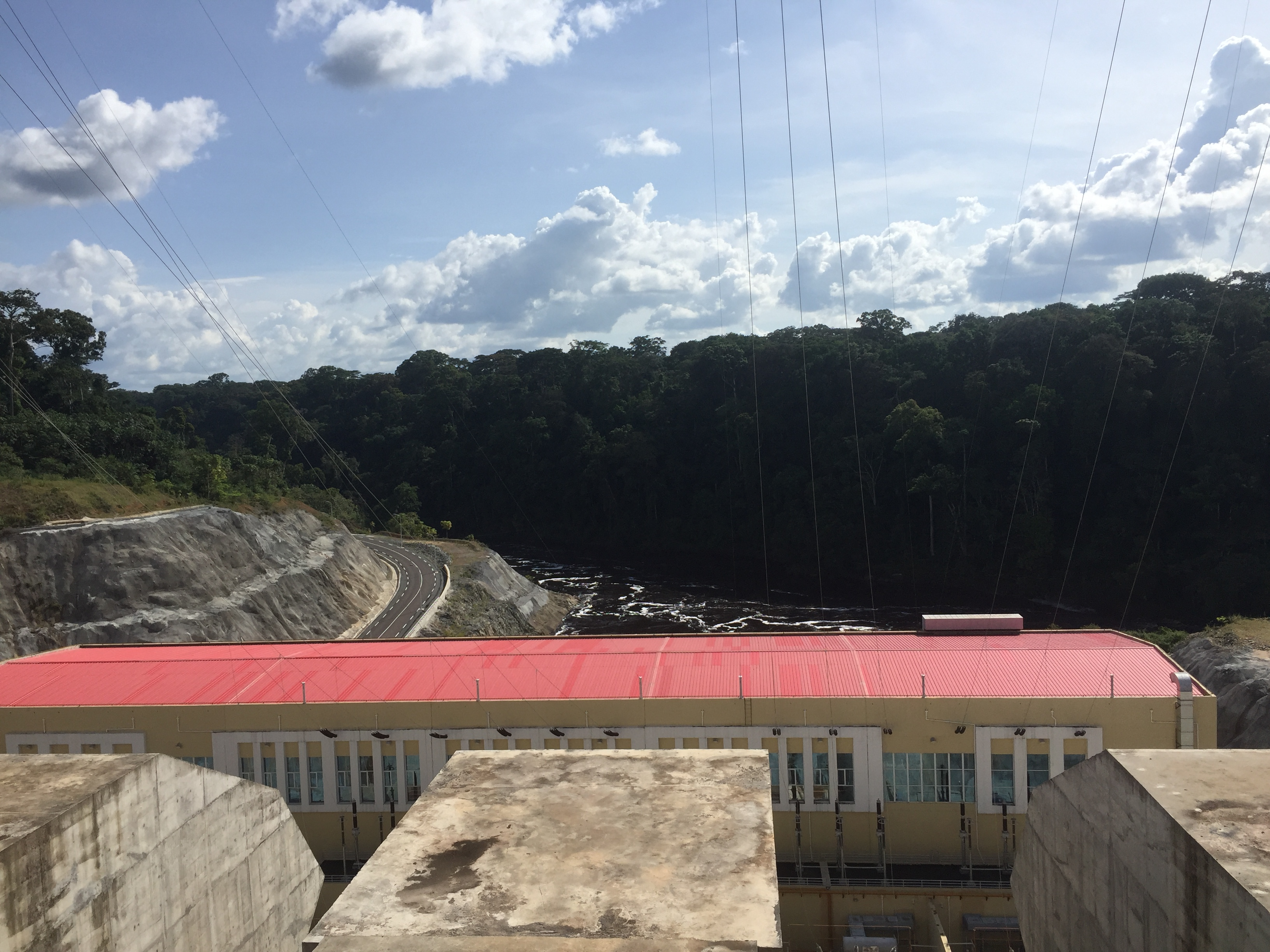
Memve'ele hydroelectric Dam Project, opened in June 2019. 63% of the project’s funding was attributed to Exim Bank of China.

- Construction of a malaria research center at Yaounde's Hospital of Gynecology, Obstetrics, and Pediatrics

Yearly trade topped 854 million US dollars in 2008, before dropping to 813 million US dollars in 2009 due to the global recession.

Cameroon joined the Belt and Road Initiative (BRI) in 2015.

== See also ==
- Foreign relations of Cameroon
- Foreign relations of China
