= High Commission of Cameroon, London =

High Commission for the Republic of Cameroon in London
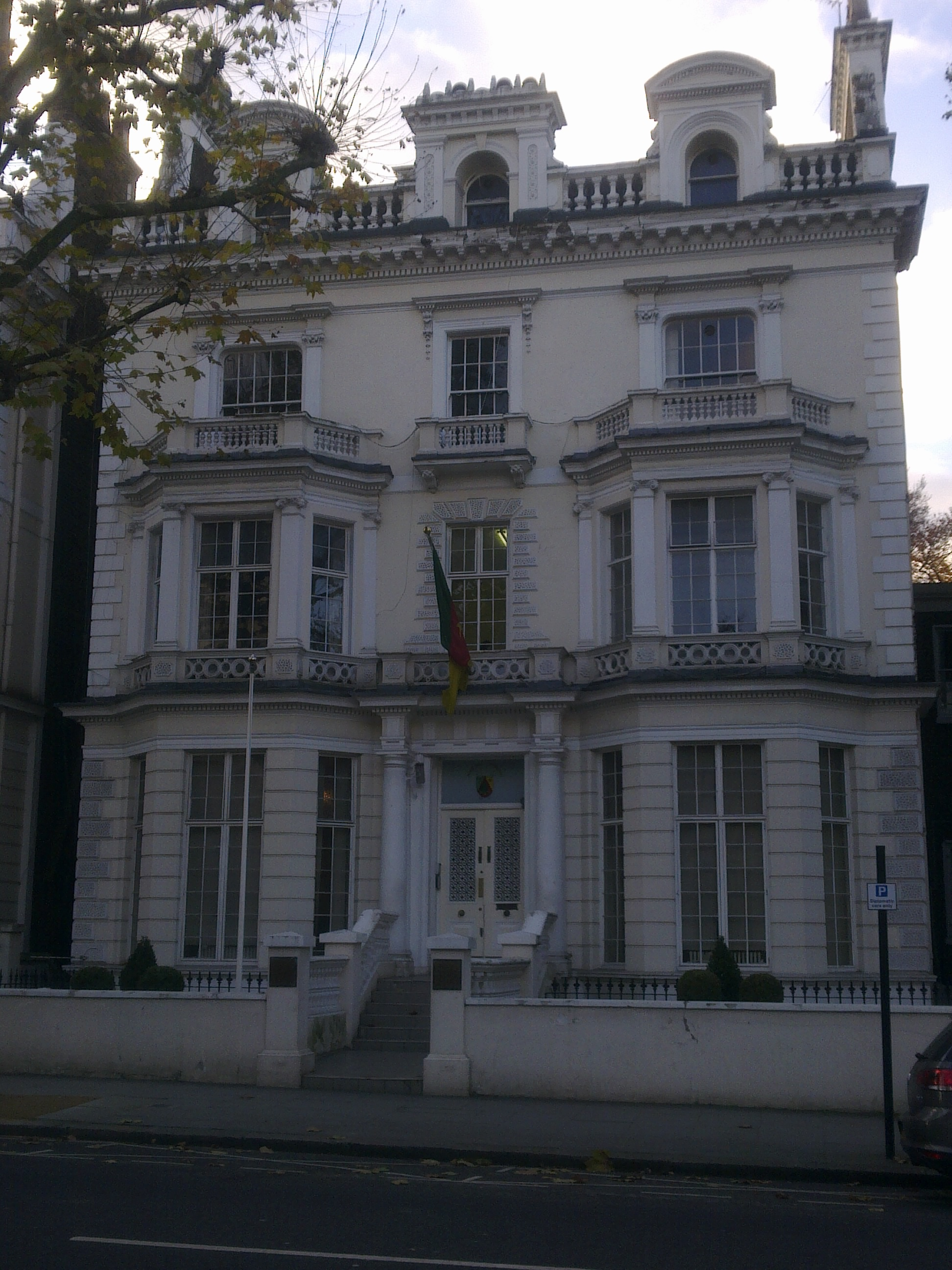
- Location: Holland Park, London
- Address: 84 Holland Park, London, W11 3SB
- Coordinates: 51°30′19.8″N 0°12′31.7″WS
- High Commissioner: Albert Fotabong

The High Commission for the Republic of Cameroon in London is the diplomatic mission of Cameroon in the United Kingdom.

A protest was held outside the embassy in 2013 following the murder of Cameroonian gay-rights activist Eric Lembembe. This led to several more protests in Cameroon, especially in the southern regions.

== Gallery ==
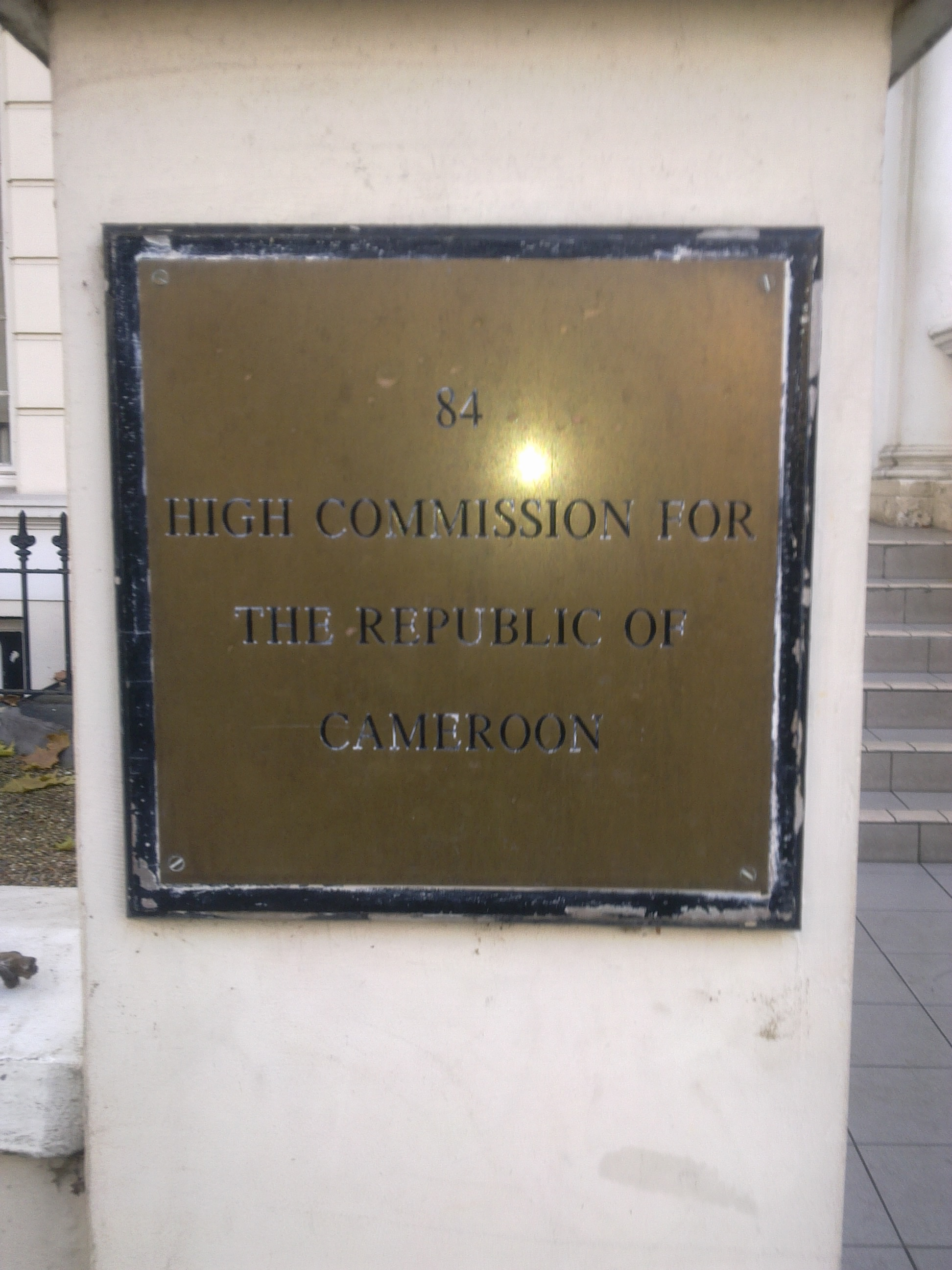
Plaque outside the High Commission

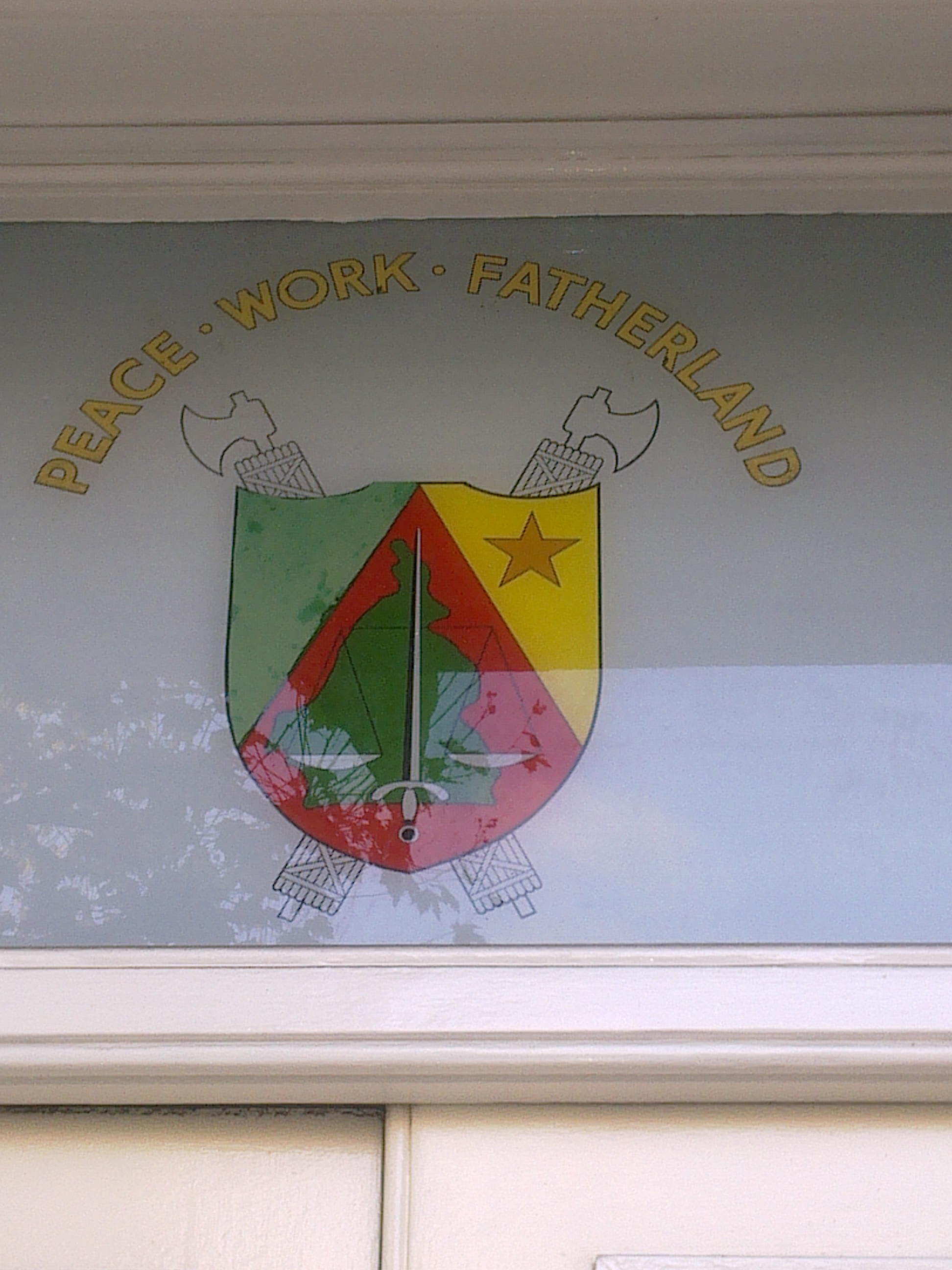
The Coat of arms of Cameroon above the entrance

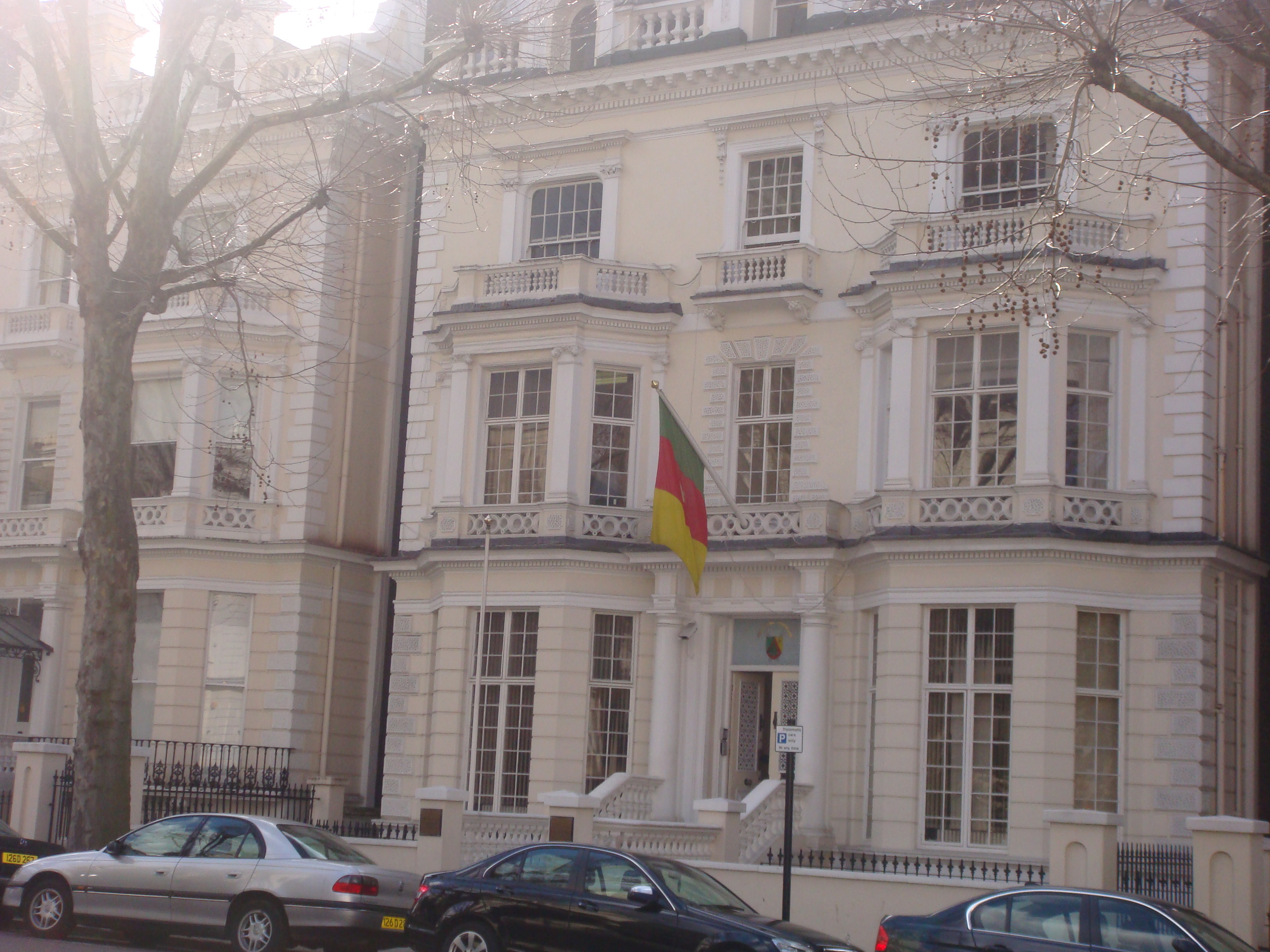
The High Commission
