= International Relations Institute of Cameroon =

International relations school in Yaoundé, Cameroon

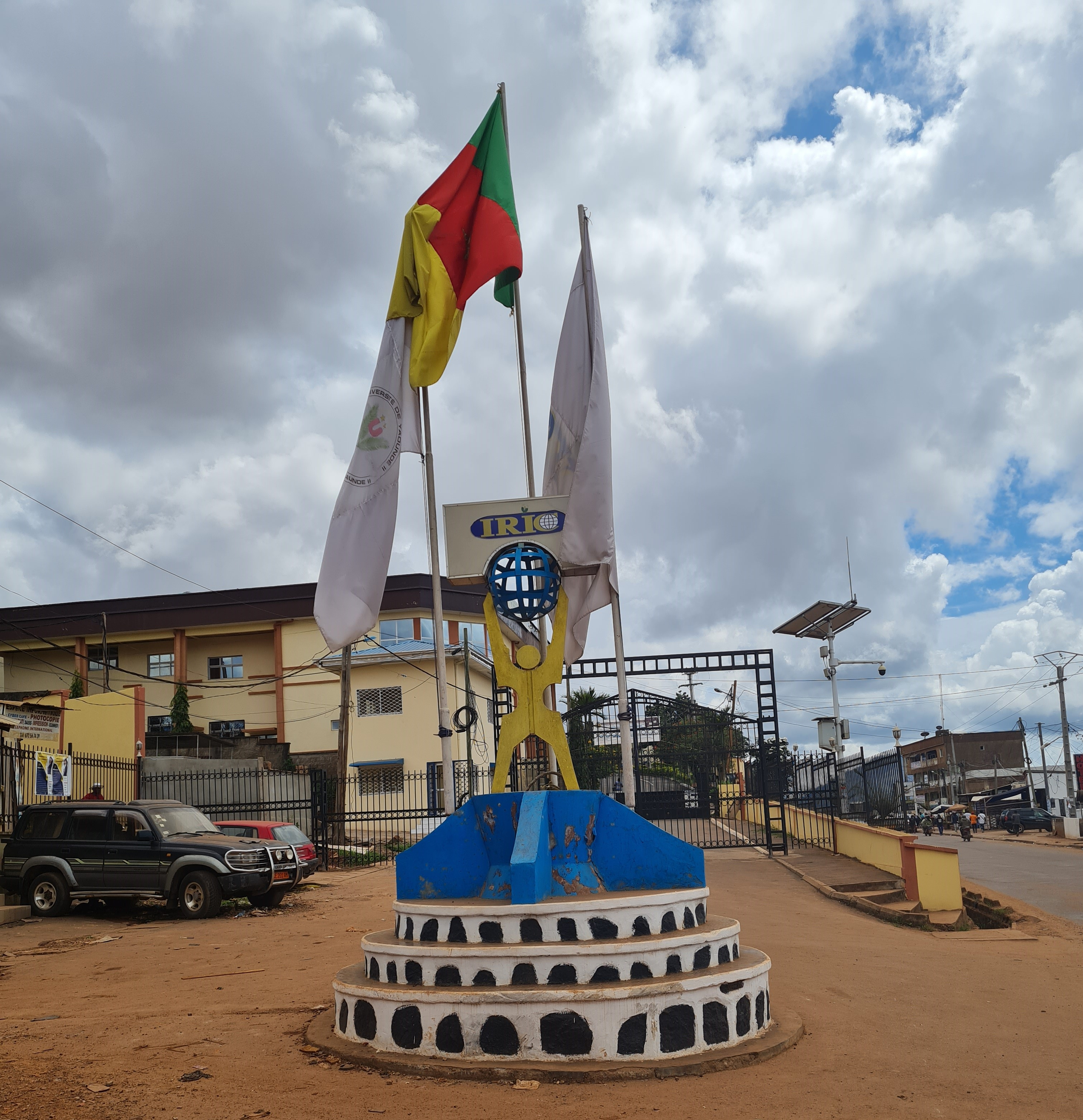
- IRIC Campus
- Motto in English: "At the service of academic and diplomatic excellence"
- Type: Public
- Established: 1971
- Rector: Adolph Minkoua Shey
- Academic staff: 100
- Administrative staff: 50
- Students: 1500
- Doctoral students: 100
- Location: Yaoundé, Obili, 859 rue de Kribi, Cameroon
- Colours: Yellow and blue
- Website: www.iricuy2.com

The International Relations Institute of Cameroon (French: Institut des Relations Internationales du Cameroun, IRIC) is one of the five Institutions of the University of Yaoundé II; it was created by decree of President Ahmadou Ahidjo on 24 April 1971. The organization of studies at the IRIC was renovated in 1993. Up until then, the Institute essentially focused on training diplomats. The new curriculum gives access to other international careers.

The IRIC serves African and world diplomacy and advocates excellence, a philosophy otherwise underpinning its own overall performances. The IRIC takes pride on its status as the oldest school of diplomacy south of Sahara, and brings the perceptions and the experiences of countries of the southern hemisphere to the world community.

The IRIC has Observer Status at all assemblies and summits of the African Union. Observer Status means that the IRIC has full diplomatic and delegate rights accorded to a member state of the African Union, with the exception that it may not cast votes

== Director ==
Daniel Urbain Ndongo was appointed Director of the IRIC on 16 July 2020 by President Paul Biya, replacing Salomon Eheth, who became Cameroon's ambassador to the United Nations in Geneva.

== Curriculum ==
The IRIC provides among other things training and research in the area of international studies. Training is carried out at IRIC through three autonomous cycles of study:

=== The Diplomatic Refresher Course ===
The Diplomatic Refresher courses for senior staff and agents of Ministries of External Relations, based on a combination of theoretical lectures and practical professional tutorials, enables students to be fully abreast with realities of their futures careers.

=== The Professional Post-Graduate Cycle ===
IRIC trains senior staff of International professions in the following majors: Diplomacy, International Disputes, International Marketing, and International Finance, Money and Banking.

=== The Doctorate Cycle ===
This cycle of study, which is highly selective, begins with the preparation of an Advanced Specialized Studies Diploma, (Diplome D'Etudes Supérieurs Spécialisées, DESS) or M.Phil. and may end with the defense of a Doctorate for those who have chosen the diplomacy option.

== Admission ==
Any candidates who is willing to apply for the competitive entrance examination at IRIC must be at least a holder of a first degree from a recognized university or similar institutions or an Advance level Certificate or equivalent (since 2007). Work experience may not be necessary.

== Course duration and structure ==
The master's degree program lasts two academic years provided that the student has passed all his/her courses. This program is fulfilled by way of lectures, seminars, tutorials and two-month internship in companies. The DESS, which is a professional Diploma equally lasts for two years and the same conditions as above are applied for its completion.

== Notable alumni ==
- Dominique Awono Essama
- Allamaye Halina, Prime Minister of Chad (2024-present)
