= List of Ambazonian commanders in the Anglophone Crisis =

This is a list of Ambazonian rebel commanders who served in armed groups during the Anglophone Crisis in Cameroon. As the political association of these commanders is often unknown, they are listed by their known active departments and other territories. For the known rebel militias involved in the conflict, see list of Ambazonian militant groups.

== Overview ==
Ambazonian commanders often take symbolic names which reference animals or specific personal traits; these are used to evoke fear and respect. Researcher Morgan Tebei Nwati has argued that many separatist leaders can be categorized as warlords, a view shared by researcher Michaela Pelican. Pelican argued that the rebel commanders effectively operated within a "market of violence", leading small private armies which not only fought an insurgency against state representatives, but also engaged in criminal activities such as kidnapping for ransom. Thus, they were using violence as an "economic basis for survival".

From 2017 to 2023, over 100 Ambazonian commanders were killed in the insurgency. For comparison, a single meeting of the Ambazonia Self-Defence Council (also known as " Ambazonia Restoration Forces"), one of several rebel factions in the conflict, was attended by over fifty "Field Mar[shals], Generals, Colonel[s] and Captains".

== Exile ==
Several Ambazonian separatist leaders are based in exile. Despite this, they play a role in directing rebel forces that are fighting in Cameroon itself. These include:

- Ayaba Cho Lucas – Leader of the Ambazonia Defence Forces (ADF). Mainly operated from exile in Europe, until his arrest in Norway in September 2024.
- Ngong Emmanuel ("Capo Daniel") – Deputy commander of the ADF until his resignation in 2023, commander of Ambazonia Dark Forces since then. Mainly operates from exile in Hong Kong.
- Ebenezer Akwanga – Leader of Southern Cameroons Defence Forces (SOCADEF). Mainly operates from exile in the United States.
- Nso Foncha Nkem ("Marshall Foncha") - Leader of the Ambazonia Self-Defence Council. Mainly operates from exile in the United States. Reportedly plays some role in the supply of foreign weapons to the rebels.
- Tapang Ivo ("General Ivo") - ADF spokesman. Mainly operates from exile in the United States.

== In Cameroon ==
=== Across several departments ===
- Clement Mbashie ("General No Pity") – Leader of the Bambalang Marine Forces, Bui Unity Warriors, and Ambazonia Revolutionary Guards. Allegedly killed in 2023.
- Benedict Nwana Kuah – ADF commander.
- "General Ebube" – Rebel commander of unknown affiliation. Operated in Bafut, Bui, and Donga-Mantung; led the blockade of the Kumbo-Nkambé road. Reportedly killed by security forces either at Nfoyah in October 2021 or at Nseh in January 2022.
- "General Above The Law" † – Commander of the Fako-Meme Black Tar Council. Operated in Fako, Bui and Meme. Killed by security forces at Mbalangi in February 2021.
- Celestine Wanche ("T-Boy") † – Rebel commander associated with "General Above The Law". Killed by security forces at Mbalangi in February 2021.
- "General Satan" † – Rebel commander of unknown affiliation. Operated in Bafut and Boyo, stronghold at Fudong. Killed by security forces in Operation Bamenda Clean in 2022.
- Chamberlain Ntou'ou Ndon ("General Gideon") † - Rebel commander of unknown affiliation. Operated along the Kumba-Buea highway. Killed by security forces in November 2022.
- "General Trouble" † – Rebel commander of the "Restoration Forces" (several groups of this name exist). Operated in Mezam and Ngo-Ketunjia, mainly based at Ndop. Killed by security forces at Ndop in 2022.
- "General Efang" ("Big Number") (POW) - ADF commander, operates at Bali in Mezam and Batibo in Momo. He was calling himself the "supreme general and commander" of separatist forces by 2021. Efang's militia fought against the rival "Buffaloes of Bali" in 2022. Captured in January 2024.
- Orock Valentine ("General Mbula") † - ADF commander, operated in Manyu and Lebialem. Allied to "General Ayeke" at one point. Killed by security forces at Ekpor village in Manyu's Upper Bayang in January 2023.
- "Field Marshall Bitter Kola" † - General and Communication Secretary of the Ambazonia People Liberation Council (APLC). Operated in Fako, where he led the APLC forces, and in Meme, where he was allied to "General Transporter". Killed in September 2023 in Meme.
- Desmond Koa ("General Mad Dog" of Ndian and Meme, also known as "Jonny Mad Dog") – "Ribbons of Ambazonia" commander, operated in Ndian and Meme. Killed by security forces in April 2024.
- "General Millepede" – "Ribbons of Ambazonia" commander, operates in Ndian and Meme.
- Henry Njimbogwe ("General No Mercy") † - Bambalang Marine Forces and Bui Unity Warriors commander, successor of General No Pity. Killed by security forces during an attack on his "Marine Forces" camp in Bambalang on 3 July 2026.
- "General Lion" - Rebel commander of unknown affiliation. Active in Fako and Meme as of July 2026.^{[a]}

=== Bafut ===
- "General A4" (executed) – Rebel commander of unknown affiliation. Captured and subsequently executed by security forces in June/July 2022.
- "Mama G" (executed) – Rebel commander of unknown affiliation. Captured and subsequently executed by security forces in June/July 2022.
- "General Lion" † – Rebel commander of unknown affiliation. Killed by security forces at Ntanka in February 2021.^{[a]}
- "General Tiger" † - Former Seven Karta commander. Stripped of his title in April 2022 for kidnapping and torturing civilians, but remained active. Killed by security forces in Bafut in August 2023.
- "General Jakaban" † - Rebel commander of unknown affiliation. Killed by security forces in March 2026.

=== Bui ===
- "General Abakwa" † – ADF commander, based at Muluf base (which was associated with Capo Daniel). Killed at Muluf by security forces in Operation Bui Clean in 2021.
- "General Insobu" † – Leader of "Bui Warriors" with his main base at Kikaikom. Killed during inter-rebel clashes by the forces of "General No Pity" in April 2022.
- "General Thunder" † (or "General Amadurah") – Bui Warriors commander, second-in-command to "General Insobu", and frontline chief commander of the Ambazonia Self-Defence Council. Killed at Kikaikom by security forces in Operation Bui Clean in 2021.
- "General Spider" † – Rebel commander of unknown affiliation. Killed by security forces in Operation Bui Clean in 2021.
- "Bui Stars" † – Rebel sub-commander of unknown affiliation. Killed by security forces in Operation Bui Clean in 2021.
- "Mensah" † – Rebel sub-commander of unknown affiliation. Killed by security forces in Operation Bui Clean in 2021.
- "Tanga" † – Rebel sub-commander of unknown affiliation. Killed by security forces in Operation Bui Clean in 2021.
- "General Mad Dog" / "Field Marshal Mad Dog" of Bui – "Bui Unity Warriors" commander. (Not to be confused with Luca Fonteh and Desmond Koa who both also used the name "Mad Dog")
- "General Asan" † – Rebel sub-commander of unknown affiliation. Killed by security forces in March 2021.
- Fon Nginyam †
- "General" Shiyntum Augustine - Rebel commander of unknown affiliation. "Allegedly notorious" for attacks on civilians in Kumbo, subsequently denounced by other Ambazonian commanders.
- "General Hassan" †
- "General Chacha" †
- "General Manu Tiger" †
- "General Fire" of Bui (MIA) - Bui Unity Warriors commander. Wounded, subsequently disappeared during his treatment at the Banso Baptist Hospital in Kumbo around September 2022. (Not to be confused with "General Fire" of Bamendakwe)
- "General Shakira" † - Bui Warriors commander loyal to "General Insobu". Killed in inter-rebel clashes by troops of "General No Pity" and "General Mad Dog of Bui" at Kikaikom in March 2022.
- Dzekashu Hans ("General Wolf") (executed) - Rebel commander of unknown affiliation. Captured by the "Bui Warriors" during inter-rebel clashes and executed around April 2022.
- "General Flyover" – ADF commander, allied with "General Bush Rambo" of Oku.
- "General Talk and Do" - Leader of the Ambazonia State Army. Stronghold in Kikaikom, Kumbo. Not to be confused with "Commander Talk and Do" of Bamenda.
- Samuel John ("General Bush Rambo" of Oku) (POW) - ADF commander, leader of the ADF's "Oku faction". Main base in Oku, operated across Bui. Reportedly fled into exile with a large sum of money and lived in Ghana for several years before trying to return to Cameroon in June 2026, leading to his arrest. (Not to be confused with other rebel commanders using the name "Bush Rambo")
- "Commandant Marcel" (POW) - Bui Unity Warriors commander. Wounded during a clash with security forces around Mbveh, he was located and captured at a hospital on 25 April 2026.
- "Major General Viper" – Bui-based commander, subordinate of "General Mad Dog" / "Field Marshal Mad Dog" of Bui.
- "General Newsman" – Bui-based commander, subordinate of "General Mad Dog" / "Field Marshal Mad Dog" of Bui.

=== Boyo ===
- "General RK" † – Southern Cameroons Restoration Forces commander, later reported as the leader of an affiliated group known as the British Southern Cameroon Resistance Force (BSCRF). Killed in September 2023 in Fundong.
- Felix Kibam ("General Slow") (surrendered) – Rebel commander of unknown affiliation. Surrendered to the National Gendarmerie at Fundong in June 2023.
- Benard Kuh ("Oga Landlord") (surrendered) – Rebel commander of unknown affiliation. Surrendered to the National Gendarmerie at Fundong in June 2023.
- "General Nyih" - Leader of the Pythons of Boyo.

=== Donga-Mantung ===
- "Field Marshal Vincent" † – Stronghold at Ndu.
- "General Try and See" † - Rebel commander of unknown affiliation. Killed by security forces at Ndu in April 2022.
- "General Tunde" (POW) - Rebel commander of unknown affiliation. Stronghold around Nkambé. Captured by security forces.
- Hassan Njatow ("Mission Commander") † - Rebel commander of unknown affiliation. Killed by security forces in December 2024.
- "General Bush Rambo" of Ndu † - Rebel commander of unknown affiliation. Mainly active in Ndu. Reportedly killed in January 2026. (Not to be confused with other rebel commanders using the name "Bush Rambo")

=== Fako ===
- "General Ten-Ten" – Leader of "Ten-Ten" militia. Stronghold at Buea.
- "Eugène" – Rebel commander of unknown affiliation. Stronghold at Ekona.
- "General Obi" of Muyuka † – Rebel commander of unknown affiliation. Stronghold at Muyuka. Killed by security forces at Ashum in June 2020. (Not to be confused with "General Obi" of Manyu)
- "General Godfather" † – Rebel commander of unknown affiliation. Stronghold at Muyuka.
- "General Beltus" †
- "General Mendo Ze" † – Rebel commander of unknown affiliation. Killed by security forces in October 2020.
- "General Black Rapen"
- "General Opopo" (executed) - SOCADEF commander at Munyenge. Captured and subsequently executed by security forces in June 2021.
- "General Wazuzu" † – Rebel commander of unknown affiliation. Stronghold at Muyuka.
- "General Opobo" † – SOCADEF commander. Captured in Likoko, Fako, and executed by the rival "Mountain Lions" rebel group in June 2021.
- Angiaboh Luther – Rebel commander of unknown affiliation.
- "Major General Sagat" - Leader of the Fako Mountain Lions. Killed by security forces in July 2026.

=== Koupé-Manengouba ===
- "General" Leonard Nyambere (surrendered) – Rebel commander of unknown affiliation. Surrendered to the government in 2020.
- Bessong Eugene † – Rebel commander of unknown affiliation. Died of his wounds around December 2021.
- Mbu Princely Tabe (POW) – Rebel commander of unknown affiliation. Wounded, captured by security forces as he received treatment by Médecins Sans Frontières around December 2021.

=== Lebialem ===
- "Field Marshall" Lekeaka Oliver † – Leader of the Red Dragon militia, Self-proclaimed Paramount Ruler of Lebialem. Killed in Menji in July 2022, either by security forces or rival rebels.
- Agbor Oscar Nkeng – Rebel commander of unknown affiliation.
- "General Ayeke" (or "Major General Ayeke") † – "Alou Guerilla Fighters" commander. A former member of the Red Dragon militia, he had begun leading his own force by September 2019. Allied to "General Mbula" at one point. He was killed by security forces at Alou or Besali Wabane in October 2020.
- "General Roma" †
- "General Ambrose" †
- "General Massacre" – commander of the "Team Retina", conducted IED attack in Lebialem in September 2023.

=== Manyu ===
- Martin Ashu – Commander of the Tigers of Ambazonia.
- "General Animal Pinkin" †
- "General Papi" †
- "General" Ntui Lambert †
- "General Ebot Ebot" † - Rebel commander of unknown affiliation.
- "General Obi" of Manyu † - Rebel commander of unknown affiliation (Not to be confused with "General Obi" of Muyuka).
- Christopher Elejuma †
- Ako Giant - Rebel commander of unknown affiliation. Stronghold in Upper Bayang.

=== Mbonge ===
- "Commander Cross" † – Rebel commander of unknown affiliation. Killed by security forces at Nake Bokoko in September 2021.
- "Emanu Cigar" † – Rebel commander of unknown affiliation. Killed by security forces at Nake Bokoko in September 2021.
- "Gazola" † – Rebel commander of unknown affiliation. Killed by security forces at Nake Bokoko in September 2021.

=== Meme ===
- "General Divine" † – Rebel commander of unknown affiliation. Recruited several other rebel leaders. Killed during inter-rebel clashes in 2020.
- "General Goddy Elangwe" (surrendered) – Rebel commander of unknown affiliation. Recruited for the rebellion by "General Divine". Surrendered to government officials at Kumba in March 2021.
- "General Nokia" (POW) – Rebel commander of unknown affiliation. Captured by security forces at Konye in March 2021.
- "General Spirito" † – Rebel commander of unknown affiliation. Killed by security forces in March 2021.
- Abid Elangwe Godwin ("General Gody") (surrendered) – Rebel commander of unknown affiliation. Surrendered to the government at some point before March 2021.
- "General" Ivo Mbah † - ADF commander, mainly operated at Matoh and Teke. Recruited for the rebellion by "General Divine". Killed by security forces at Kumba in December 2018.
- "General Deco" † - Rebel commander of unknown affiliation. Killed by security forces near Kumba in June 2022.
- Ayuk Ndifon Defcam ("General Transporter" of Meme) † - Rebel commander of disputed affiliation. Blamed for the Kumba school massacre by the government. Killed by security forces at Wame in January 2023. (Not to be confused with Ngo-Ketunjia's "General Transporter")
- "General Bitter Collar" - Ambazonia Self-Defence Council commander.
- "General David of Teke" †
- "General" Andrew Ngoe † - SOCADEF commander at Matoh. Killed in January 2019.
- "General Shadow" † - Stronghold at Bakundu.
- "Boss Menti" † - Rebel commander of unknown affiliation. Stronghold at Etam.
- "General Ayuk" † - Rebel commander of unknown affiliation. Killed in December 2023.
- Ndiba Lenya Clifford ("General Lucifer" or "Field Marshall Lucifer") † - "King" of the Al-Qaeda Squad of Meme. Killed by security forces during the Bombanda raid in Mbonge Subdivision in October 2024.
- Besaka Belget ("General Black Bat") † - Rebel leader of unknown affiliation. Killed in June 2024.
- "Commander Yong Money" - Rebel commander, possibly associated with "General Lucifer". Killed by security forces during a raid in Mbonge in July 2023.
- "General Rassman" - Subordinate officer of "General Lucifer", killed by security forces during the Bombanda raid in Mbonge Subdivision in October 2024.
- "General Don Plus" - Subordinate officer of "General Lucifer", killed by security forces during the Bombanda raid in Mbonge Subdivision in October 2024.
- "General Police" - Subordinate officer of "General Lucifer", killed by security forces during the Bombanda raid in Mbonge Subdivision in October 2024.
- "Colonel Viper" - Subordinate officer of "General Lucifer", killed by security forces during the Bombanda raid in Mbonge Subdivision in October 2024.
- "Colonel Doze" - Subordinate officer of "General Lucifer", killed by security forces during the Bombanda raid in Mbonge Subdivision in October 2024.
- "Commandant Black" - Subordinate officer of "General Lucifer", killed by security forces during the Bombanda raid in Mbonge Subdivision in October 2024.
- "Field Marshal Millipede" (surrendered) - Rebel commander of unknown affiliation. Surrendered alongside several followers to security forces in April 2025.

=== Menchum ===
- "General Stone" - Rebel leader of unknown affiliation. Commanded 78 fighters as of November 2024. (Not to be confused with "General Stone" of Bamenda.)
- "Vandam" † - Rebel leader of unknown affiliation. Killed by security forces in June 2025.

=== Mezam ===
- Silas Zama – Leader of Ambaland Quifor.
- Richard Nformumbang Ndango ("General Fire"/"General Fire Man" of Bamendakwe) † – Rebel commander of unknown affiliation. Killed by security forces in 2020. (Not to be confused with "General Fire" of Bui)
- "Colonel John" † – ADF commander. Associate of "General Rasta". Killed by security forces around Batibo and Bambui in July 2022.
- Asenjo Roy Angafor ("General Rasta") † – ADF commander. Killed by security forces around Batibo and Bambui in July 2022.
- "General Sweet Tuma" (POW) – Rebel commander of unknown affiliation. Captured by security forces in Operation Bamenda Clean in 2021.
- "General Action Man" † – Rebel commander of unknown affiliation. Killed by security forces in Operation Bamenda Clean in 2021.
- "General Scatter" (surrendered) – Rebel commander of unknown affiliation. Mainly based at Noni. Surrendered to the government in 2022.
- Luca Fonteh ("General Mad Dog" of Mankon) † – Operated in Bamenda. Killed by security forces at Ntasen in September 2020. (Not to be confused with Bui's "General Mad Dog" and Desmond Koa in Ndian)
- "General Blink" † – Stronghold at Bambili. Killed by security forces at Bambelle in April 2021.
- "General Okoro" † – Rebel commander of unknown affiliation. Killed by security forces in July 2020.
- "Bush General" (POW) – Rebel commander of unknown affiliation. Captured by security forces in July 2020.
- "General Cobra" (POW) – Rebel commander of unknown affiliation. Captured by security forces in April 2021.
- "General Grandpa of the Buffalos" – Rebel commander of unknown affiliation. Stronghold at Bali Nyonga.
- "General Lion" † – Rebel commander of unknown affiliation. Killed by security forces at Mankon in Operation Bamenda Clean in December 2022.^{[a]}
- "Commander Armoured Car" - Ambazonia Self-Defence Council commander.
- "Boss Acid" † - Stronghold at Bali.
- "General Cross and Die" †
- "General Koraman" †
- Nchuaji Nobert ("General Stone" or "Stone Cornered") † - Born in Mbessa village in Moyo. ADF commander with stronghold in Bamenda. Killed by security forces in June 2024. (Not to be confused with "General Stone" of Menchum.)
- "Commander Iron" † - Rebel commander of unknown affiliation. Killed by security forces in July 2024.
- "General 5-Star" - Rebel commander of unknown affiliation. Killed by security forces in November 2024.
- "Commander Talk and Do" † - ADF commander in Bamenda, killed in 2021. Not to be confused with "General Talk and Do" of Kikaikom.
- "Commander Brandy" † - ADF commander in Bamenda, killed in 2021.
- "Commander Striker" - Rebel commander of unknown affiliation. Stronghold in Alabukam.
- "General Weapon" † - ADF commander. Stronghold in Alabukam, Bamenda. Killed by security forces in November 2024 alongside his deputy, "Colonel Mami".
- "General JC" † - Rebel commander of unknown affiliation. Stronghold in Bamenda. Killed by security forces in February 2025.
- "General Bush Rambo" of Ngomgham † - Rebel commander of unknown affiliation. Stronghold at Ngomgham in Bamenda. (Not to be confused with other rebel commanders using the name "Bush Rambo")

=== Momo ===
- "General Danger" – Ambazonia State Army commander, active in Ngie and at the Tugi-Bamenda road in Momo.
- "General Idi Amin Dada" † – Rebel commander of unknown affiliation. Killed by security forces at Guneku in April 2021.
- "General King Commando" † (or "General Commando") - Rebel commander of unknown affiliation. Opponent to the ADF during inter-rebel fighting. Killed by security forces at Andek Ngie in November 2021.
- "General Nanfang" - Stronghold at Ngie.
- "General Sebastien" † - Rebel commander of unknown affiliation. Stronghold at Widikum. Killed by security forces at Widikum in January 2019.
- "General Soup" † - Stronghold at Batibo.
- "General Witch Bird" (executed) - Rebel commander of unknown affiliation. Captured and executed by unknown individuals at Mbengwi in July 2022.
- "General Tiger" † – Rebel commander of unknown affiliation. Rival of the ADF commander "General Ivo". Stronghold at Guzang near Batibo. Killed by forces of "General Ivo" in October 2021.
- "General One Bullet" † - Rebel commander of unknown affiliation. Stronghold at Batibo.
- "General Christian" † - Rebel commander of unknown affiliation. Stronghold at Widikum.
- "General Popo" † - Rebel commander of unknown affiliation. Stronghold in Effa. Killed by security forces in Effa in October 2024.
- "General Sumanguru" - ADF commander.

=== Ndian ===
- "General" Ikeku David †
- "General John Rambo" † – Stronghold at Bamusso.
- "General Baron" (surrendered) – Rebel commander of unknown affiliation. Surrendered to government officials at Mundemba in May 2023.
- "General Jer boy" (surrendered) – Rebel commander of unknown affiliation. Surrendered to government officials at Mundemba in May 2023.
- "General Ten Kobo" – "Expendables 100" commander. Stronghold at Ekondo-Titi.
- "Colonel Toless" † - Rebel commander of unknown affiliation. Stronghold in Makobe, Ekondo-Titi. Killed by security forces in December 2024.

=== Ngo-Ketunjia ===
- Sama Elvis Tiamama ("General Transporter" of Ngo-Ketunjia) † - Rebel commander of unknown affiliation. Killed by security forces at Bamali in June 2022. (Not to be confused with Meme's "General Transporter")
- "Sagon Jaguar" (also known as "General Sagard" or "General Sagon") † - "Leader" of the Ambazonia Restoration Forces (several groups of this name exist) and the Jaguars of Bamessing. Operated around Bamessing. Killed by security forces in Bamunka in May 2024.
- "General" Leonard Tatoh - Rebel commander of unknown affiliation, but allied to "General Transporter" of Ngo-Ketunjia. Stronghold at Bamali.
- "Unknown Soldier of Bafanji" †
- "General Spoiler" † - Rebel commander of unknown affiliation. Stronghold at Bafanji.
- "General Kolambo" - Leader of the Black Lions of Bamali.
- "General No Mercy" - Rebel commander of unknown affiliation.
- Tantoh Leonard ("General Colabo") † - Rebel leader of unknown affiliation. Killed by his own fighters over an internal dispute in August 2024.
- Ngeh Cyprian ("General The Only Bro") - Rebel commander of unknown affiliation.
- "General A Nova Die" - Rebel commander of unknown affiliation.

== Cameroon–Nigeria border and Bakassi ==
At the Cameroon–Nigeria border and on the Bakassi peninsula, the Anglophone Crisis overlaps with two other local insurgencies, namely the Bakassi conflict and the insurgency in Southeastern Nigeria. Thus, the local rebels include not just Ambazonian separatists, but also Biafran separatists.

- "General Black Mamba" (POW) – Rebel commander of unknown affiliation, though of Ambazonian alignment. Captured by Nigerian Special Forces at Ikom in June 2021.
- "General Basile" (POW) – Rebel commander of unknown affiliation, though of Ambazonian alignment. Captured by the Nigerian police in Kurmi in November 2022.
- Ebuta Akor Takon - Deputy commander of the Biafra Nations League (BNL).
- "Aso Rock" - BNL commander.

== Unknown territory ==
- "General" Ekeom Polycarb (surrendered) – Rebel commander of unknown affiliation. Surrendered to North West Governor Adolphe Lele Lafrique in 2019.
- Success Nkongho (surrendered) – Leader of "Ground Zero" militia. Surrendered to the government in 2020.
- "General Ekeku" - Leader of unknown affiliation. Recruited for the rebellion by "General Divine".
- "General" Apande Kingsley †
- "General Ashu" †
- "General Virus" †
- "The Liberator" - Spokesman of "Ambazonia Military Forces" (several groups of this name exist).
- "General" A.M. Michael
- "General Boss Kala" † – Rebel commander of unknown affiliation. Stronghold at Ntangka.
- Chia Martin ("Tiger 1") – Tigers of Ambazonia commander.
- "General Molua C" – SOCADEF commander.
- "General Jason" – SOCADEF commander.

== Footnotes ==
- ^{a} Two deceased separatist commanders have been known as "General Lion". One of them was killed in February 2021, the other in December 2022. A third "General Lion" was known to be active as of July 2026.
