= Timeline of the Anglophone Crisis (2020) =

Conflict, started 2017, in Cameroon

This is a timeline of the Anglophone Crisis in Cameroon during 2020.

The Anglophone Crisis is an ongoing armed conflict in the Republic of Cameroon in Central Africa, where historically English-speaking Ambazonian separatists are seeking the independence of the former British trust territory of Southern Cameroons, which was unified with Cameroon since 1961.

== January ==
- On 1 January, suspected separatists burned down the office of the Divisional Officer of Muyuka, after clashing with soldiers in the area. In Buea, separatists clashed with Cameroonian soldiers and burned a vehicle. In Donga Mantung, six people were killed in a Cameroonian raid. In Bamessing, Cameroonian forces started a four-day clean-up of road blocks mounted by separatists. The same day, the Ambazonia Military Forces declared that a lockdown encompassing all of Southern Cameroons would take place between 7 and 12 February, in order to prevent the 2020 Cameroonian parliamentary election from taking place in the Anglophone regions. The separatists declared that anyone caught outdoors in cities and villages during the lockdown would be considered an enemy, and stated that the declaration had been issued weeks in advance in order to give people time stock up food and prepare.
- On 2 January, civilians in Balikumbat demonstrated against the separatists, accusing them of forcing people to give them money and of bringing insecurity to the village. The protest was guarded by Cameroonian soldiers.
- On 4 January, residents of Balikumbat stormed nearby separatist camp, seized weapons and arrested fighters.
- On 5 January, Fon Ndofoa Zofoa III of Babungo gave separatist fighters in the vicinity 24 hours to release villagers they had abducted, threatening to expel the fighters' families from the village. He also urged villagers to assist the Cameroonian security forces if they could. In response to the ultimatum, armed separatists attempted to storm the palace and abduct the Fon, but villagers intervened and stopped the separatists. In Babessi, separatist fighters abducted the SDF mayor along with at least four councillors. In Ndu, a detainee died after being tortured by Cameroonian soldiers.
- On 6 January, "General Divine", a separatist commander based in Meme Division, was killed by his own men, who accused him of terrorizing nearby communities. According to sources, fellow separatists had warned him many times not to commit atrocities against civilians, and when he did not stop, they finally decided to get rid of him. Another commander was also killed during the incident. Meanwhile, in anticipation of the upcoming 9 February election, 350 Cameroonian soldiers were deployed to various locations in Southwest Region to protect voters.
- On 7 January, nine suspected separatists arriving on bikes stormed a gendarme post in Bangourain, West Region. The sole gendarme on duty ran away, enabling the attackers to capture weapons and ammunition without encountering any resistance. In Donga-Mantung, separatists burned down the ELECAM office in Misaje, as part of their campaign to disrupt the February election.
- By 8 January, there had been at least five instances where villagers had attacked separatist camps. Separatist leaders openly condemned war crimes committed by fellow separatists, and the Ambazonia Defence Forces ordered its fighters to arrest anyone caught terrorizing civilians. Separatists also claimed that some of the separatist excesses were actually false-flag actions conducted by Cameroonian forces, an allegation strongly denied by Cameroon. In Meme Division, at least five separatist fighters laid down their arms.

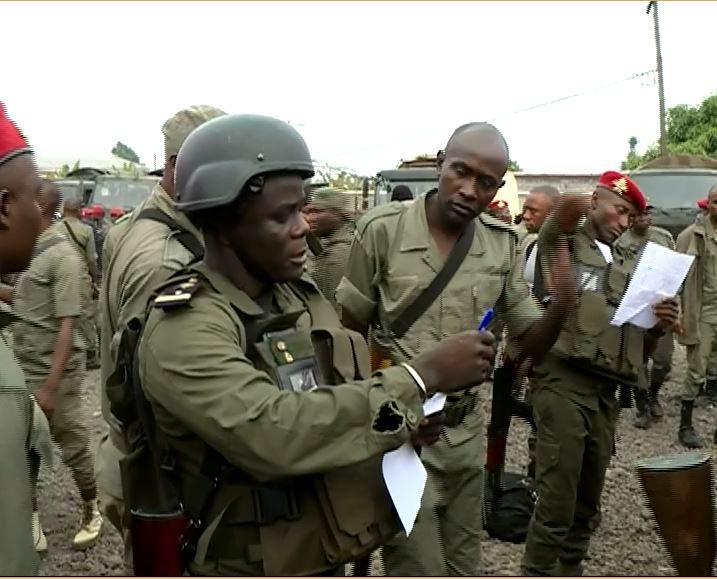
Gendarmes arriving in Buea, 9 January.

- On 9 January 350 gendarmes deployed in Northwest Region to counter the separatist effort to sabotage the upcoming elections, following a similar deployment in Southwest Region. In Santa, Cameroonian soldiers invaded the village Mbenjom Awing, killing two separatist fighters, one civilian as well as livestock, and burning down several houses.
- On 10 January, five soldiers of the Rapid Intervention Battalion (BIR) were arrested for abducting a man in Buea.
- On 11 January, a prominent officer of the Red Dragon militia was killed while leading an attack on Cameroonian forces in Menji.
- On 12 January, suspected separatists burned down the residence of CPDM politician Kennedy Acha in Bamenda.
- On 13 January, separatists ambushed and killed one Cameroonian soldier and injured another in Muyuka.
- On 14 January, Cameroonian troops raided the villages of Bangem and Babubock, burning dozens of houses.
- On 15 January, separatist fighters ambushed and killed a Cameroonian soldier in Bamenda. The soldier's girlfriend was also wounded in the incident. In Bamenda, separatists attacked two civilians who had attempted to circumvent a separatist checkpoint, killing one of them and injuring the other.
- On 16 January, separatists ambushed Cameroonian soldiers in Mamfe. The death toll was not revealed.
- On 18 January, a gun battle occurred between Cameroonian soldiers and separatist fighters in Mulang, Bamenda, after the separatists had set fire to a garbage truck. The separatists eventually withdrew to their base in Ntasen. In Meluf, six dead bodies were discovered by villagers. Local sources reported that the dead were ADF fighters who had been abducted and killed by the Southern Cameroons Restoration Forces. It was also reported that the six dead were among a total of 40 ADF fighters who had been abducted. ADF spokesman Tapang Ivo Tanku confirmed the loss. Both the ADF and the Southern Cameroons Restoration Forces condemned each other, while both claimed that the infighting owed to infiltration by the Cameroonian Army. The Cameroonian Army denied this claim.
- On 19 January, "General Chacha" of the Southern Cameroons Restoration Forces posted a video where he demanded that all separatist groups submit to his militia.
- On 21 January, suspected separatist abducted 24 school children in Kumba. Security forces rescued the hostages in an operation later the same day, "neutralizing" two of the abductors in the process. In Kondengui Central Prison, other prisoners broke into the cells of Sisiku Julius Ayuk Tabe and nine other Ambazonian leaders serving a life sentence, stealing food and money. The victims wrote a letter in which they stated the prison administration had been silent on the matter, despite there being witnesses, and they claimed that there was a conspiracy threaten their lives.
- On 22 January, a soldier was killed in Ndoh. Cameroonian forces retaliated the next day, carrying out a mass shooting inside a market. At least 16 people were killed, and at least five were wounded.
- On 23 January, former Ambazonian general Leonard Nambere, who had returned to Cameroon on 31 December 2019 upon accepting an amnesty deal, went to visit inmates at the Kondengui Central Prison. He was nearly lynched by Anglophone inmates who blamed him for abandoning the Ambazonian cause, and had to be smuggled out of the prison. In Kumba, police officers clashed with separatist fighters, killing one fighter.
- On 26 January, General Chacha of the Southern Cameroons Restoration Forces was captured and summarily executed when Cameroonian soldiers raided his base in Kikaikom, Kumbo. Some estimated 20 other separatist fighters were also killed during the raid. Following the escalation, the Cameroonian police braced for the possibility that separatists could start carrying out attacks in Yaoundé, warning that there was already a network in place that could make such attacks possible. In Ndop, armed men took control of a local radio station and set the building on fire. No one claimed responsibility for the attack.
- On 27 January, Cameroonian forces launched three simultaneous assaults on separatist camps in Kikaikom, Kumbo. According to the Cameroonian Army, separatist losses were 13 dead, while the Cameroonian side suffered two wounded.
- Between 28–29 January, four people were killed when Cameroonian forces raided Mbiame and Nkambe.
- On 30 January, separatists abducted four staff members at a local NGO in Bamenda. The staff members were subjected to physical violence before being released the next day. Three staff members from a different organization were also abducted in Bamenda, but they were all released after it turned out that the separatists had mistaken them for being involved in organizing the upcoming election. In Buea, separatist fighters abducted a student; they chopped off her finger days later, before releasing her after a ransom had been paid.

== February ==
- On 1 February, separatists carried out two separate attacks on a convoy transporting CPDM activists who were campaigning in Mbengwi and Bamenda. Four activists and a policeman were injured in the attacks.
- On 2 February, security forces raided the villages of Owe and Ikata, Fako Division. Three civilians were killed in Ikata.
- On 3 February, security forces carried out raids in Muyuka that continued into the following day. Three civilians were killed in these raids, while 45 houses were burned down, 300 people were detained and 3,000 people fled.
- On 5 February, there were clashes in Buea that continued into the next day.
- On 6 February, separatists clashed with Cameroonian forces in Kumba. In the village of Bakebe in Mamfe, at least six people were killed by Cameroonian soldiers.
- On 7 February, a separatist-imposed five-day lockdown, designed to prevent the Cameroonian parliamentary election from being held in the Anglophone regions, came into force.
- On 8 February, the Cameroonian parliamentary election was initiated. Due to the security situation, the turnout in the Anglophone regions was very low, with many civilians having fled days in advance. In addition, separatists had abducted at least 120 candidates within the past two weeks, half of whom were still in captivity on election day. According to the separatists, 98 percent of the population boycotted the election. The Cameroonian government claimed that there had been a massive turnout, and the electoral body Elecam claimed that there had been "no major incidents". The results in 11 constituencies were later nullified due to separatist activities on election day, triggering a partial reelection on 22 March. In Bafut, separatists burned down a public building that was meant to be used as a polling station on election day. In Sabga, separatists attacked a military convoy, injuring three soldiers. In Ndop and Ndu, Cameroonian forces arrested hundreds of civilians, many of whom were forced to vote.
- On 9 February, two separatist fighters were killed in Babungu, and one Cameroonian soldier was killed in Befang. Fighting took place around several separatist roadblocks in rural areas. In Muyuka, heavy fighting practically prevented anyone from voting in the election. There were also armed clashes in Buea and Kumba.
- On 14 February, at least 22 civilians were massacred in Ntumbo, Northwest Region by Cameroonian soldiers. The Cameroonian Army quickly dismissed claims that a massacre had taken place; it claimed to have killed seven separatist fighters in Ntumbo, and that five civilians had died in a fire caused by an accidental explosion triggered by stray bullets. Independent sources were able to quickly establish that the actual number of civilian casualties was much higher than the figure presented by Cameroon. The massacre was condemned by the United Nations and the United States. After running its own investigation, the Cameroonian government maintained that the civilians who died in Ngarbuh had been accidentally killed during a battle with separatists, and that none of its soldiers had killed any civilians on purpose.
- By 16 February, at least 35 civilians had been killed and 40 houses had been burned down within less than a week.
- On 19 February, a soldier shot dead a civilian while running from security control. He was arrested the following day.
- On 24 February, Cameroonian soldiers arrested a man who had given information about the Ngarbuh massacre to international media.
- On 25 February, separatist fighters attacked a command post in Mendankwe, Bamenda, killing one soldier and wounding another three, killing one civilian engineer, abducting five people, destroying a military vehicle and capturing weapons.
- On 27 February, separatists attacked Cameroonian soldiers in Bamendakwe, Mezam Division, killing one soldier and abducting four people. One civilian was also killed during the attack.
- On 29 February, Cameroonian soldiers attacked Small Babanki, a village in Mezam Division, storming the home of separatist general Richard Nformumbang Ndango, known as "General Fire", killing him and his wife. Cameroon claimed to have killed 10 other separatists as well, while local witnesses claimed that the soldiers had massacred 10 civilians. Local sources also claimed that the soldiers had burned down 17 houses and confiscated livestock. In Bui, an alleged eyewitness to the Ngarbuh massacre was murdered.

== March ==
- On 1 March, Cameroonian soldiers raped 20 women, killed one man, and burned and plundered houses in Ebam, Southwest Region. 36 people were taken to a military camp, where many were subjected to severe beating and torture. One person later died in captivity. The others were released between 4–6 March, after their families had paid money.
- Between 1–4 March, at least 16 people were killed in clashes between separatist fighters and Cameroonian soldiers, including an unspecified number of civilians.
- On 7 March, around 20 separatist fighters carried out attacks on a police station and gendarmerie in Galim, West Region, killing two gendarmes, two police officers and four civilians. The separatists seized weapons before heading back to the Anglophone regions. The Interim Government of Ambazonia issued a statement where it claimed that none of its forces were responsible for the attack, as they fought exclusively within the Anglophone regions. This stance is not shared by the Ambazonia Governing Council (AGovC).
- On 8 March, an improvised explosive device killed one soldier and injured four soldiers, two police officers and one civilian in Bamenda. Following the explosion, five suspects were arrested. In Enyoh, Batibo Subdivision, villagers attacked and burned down a separatist camp and freed a number of prisoners, including the local Fon.
- On 9 March, separatist fighters attacked several police and gendarme units in Bamenda, triggering gunfights that lasted well into the night.
- On 10 March, separatists attacked a military post in Akwaya, Manyu Division.
- On 12 March, separatists killed five hostages, including two mayors. The killings took place after the Cameroonian Army had raided their camp, freed five hostages and killed seven separatist fighters. The hostages had been subjected to beatings and rape.
- On 13 March, Cameroonian forces advanced on the villages of Bambalang and Bangolan, killing at least six civilians and one separatist fighter. A Cameroonian military base was subsequently established in Bangolan.
- On 19 March, separatists killed a couple suspected of revealing the locations of separatists in Vekovi, Jakiri, Bui Division.
- On 21 March, separatists attacked vehicles transporting election material and candidates in Batibo, injuring four soldiers and two officials.
- On 22 March, the Cameroonian Army claimed to have destroyed 10 separatist camps and killed at least 20 separatist fighters, including a leader known as "General Action Man", over the last five days during an offensive in Ngo-Ketunjia which had involved 350 soldiers. According to Brigadier-General Valere Nka, among those killed were the ones who had carried out the raid on Galim on 7 March. The separatists confirmed the loss of their camps, but claimed that the Cameroonian Army had suffered a higher number of soldiers killed. The Cameroonian Army denied suffering any losses at all. Local witnesses claimed that the Cameroonian soldiers had killed a number of civilians during the offensive; this was also denied by the Cameroonian Army. Meanwhile, a partial legislative election was initiated in 11 constituencies, where the election results from the 9 February elections had been nullified due separatist activities. Hundreds of soldiers were deployed to the 11 constituencies, where some 300,000 people had been asked to vote again. Separatists moved to disrupt the election, clashing with security forces in Bamenda where two civilians were killed in the crossfire. Just like in February, abstention rates were high. In Batibo, clashes lasted throughout much of the day. In Ekondo-Titi, separatist fighters killed two Cameroonian soldiers. In Bui, the Southern Cameroons Restoration Forces started enforcing an unannounced lockdown, effectively blocking all traffic from Jakiri to Kumbo. By 30 March, they had burned three vehicles in their effort to enforce this blockade.
- On 23 March, unidentified arsonists burned down the house of the Imam of Kumbo.
- On 24 March, it was erroneously reported that Ambazonian commander "General No Pity", leader of the "Bambalang Marine Forces", had been killed by unknown individuals after a meeting with other Ambazonian commanders. "General No Pity" emerged afterwards. This was later proven to be false.
- On 25 March, the Southern Cameroons Defence Forces declared a two-week ceasefire to give people time to get tested for COVID-19. The ceasefire would go into effect on 29 March, and would last until 12 April. The move was welcomed by the United Nations, which encouraged other groups to follow suit. The Interim Government of Ambazonia conditioned a ceasefire on it being a mutual understanding with Cameroon and observed by international parties. The AGovC supported a ceasefire in theory, but said that Cameroon had to confine its troops to their bases in order for the ADF to declare a ceasefire.
- On 28 March, an armored car transporting 11 officials and a soldier was ambushed by separatists in Oku, slipping off the road and falling into a valley. Eight people died in the crash, while four survivors were shot dead by the separatist fighters. Among the killed were two deputy mayors.
- On 29 March, the same day as the unilateral ceasefire declared by SOCADEF went into effect, President Sako declared the shutting of Ambazonia's borders and restriction of movement and public gatherings in order to limit the spreading of COVID-19. The restrictions would go into effect on 1 April.
- On 31 March, gendarmes killed four civilians in Okoyong, Manyu.

== April ==
- On 6 April, suspected separatists attempted to burn down the Ndu Council.
- On 7 April, the Cameroonian government announced the "Presidential Plan for the Reconstruction and Development of the North West and South West regions of Cameroon". According to this plan, the Cameroonian government would rebuild 350 schools, 115 health centers, six kilometers of roads including four bridges, roughly 12,000 homes, 45 markets and 500 kilometers of power lines. Separatists quickly denounced the plan, claiming that the government in Yaoundé had no right to carry out the plan in their country.
- On 8 April, in response to the government announcement the previous day, separatists launched attacks in villages across Anglophone regions, attacking military bases and destroying public buildings in Lebialem, Manyu, Bui, Donga-Mantung and Ngoketunjia. The Cameroonian military claimed to have killed 13 separatists during battles in Kumba, Vekovi, Tatum and Mbiame, while the separatists claimed to have inflicted higher losses on the Cameroonian military.
- On 8 April, unidentified individuals attempted to abduct a journalist in Bamenda.
- On 10 April, SOCADEF announced that it would extend its unilateral ceasefire to 26 April. The ceasefire was originally meant to expire on 12 April.
- On 13 April, suspected separatists killed at least one civilian and abducted many more in Bonakanda, Fako Division. In Ikata, Muyuka Division, Cameroonian soldiers burned a number of houses and forced many to flee.
- On 18 and 19 April, separatists carried out coordinated attacks in several villages. The Cameroonian Army claimed that 26 people were killed by separatists during these attacks, including mayors and traditional rulers.
- On 20 April, gunmen assassinated two members of a traditional council in Bambili. The assailants were subsequently shot dead by Cameroonian soldiers.
- On 22 April, the Cameroonian Army executed six unarmed men in Muambong, including four former separatist fighters who had accepted an amnesty offer back in 2019. The executions were reportedly carried out with a knife and an axe, and most of the victims were executed in front of their relatives. Following the executions, the Senior Divisional Officer for Kupe Muanenguba issued a statement warning separatists in the Muambong to cease their activities, lest they provoke another raid.
- On 24 April, armed men abducted three government officials in Boyo, Northwest Region.
- On 26 April, the Cameroonian military initiated Operation Free Bafut, a series of raids in and around Bafut, stronghold of the Seven Karta militia. The operation involved 300 soldiers, and aimed to push the separatists out of Bafut altogether. Throughout the day, the soldiers killed one civilian and arrested several others.
- On 27 April, Cameroonian troops raided the palace of the Fon of Bafut.
- On 28 April, a soldier was killed in Mamfe.
- On 29 April, the Cameroonian Army claimed to have killed 11 separatist fighters in Nwa, Donga-Mantung, and taken another five prisoner. According to the Cameroonian Army, no soldiers were wounded in the clashes.

== May ==
- By 1 May, the Cameroonian military claimed to have destroyed two separatist camps in Bafut, killed two separatist commanders known as General Alhaji and General Peace Plant, and confiscated weapons and vehicles from the separatists.
- On 5 May, one civilian was killed in the crossfire during a five-hour gun battle between separatists and Cameroonian soldiers in Mamfe.
- On 10 May, separatist fighters assassinated the newly elected mayor of Mamfe, Ashu Priestly Ojong. The fighters had lured the Mayor into a trap by calling him and claiming that they wanted to lay down their arms. Two soldiers who accompanied the Mayor were also wounded. Hours later, the chief of the Bakebe Telecentre, Kimi Samson, was murdered in Upper Bayang, Manyu by suspected separatists.
- On 12 May, around 30 armed Fulani killed two civilians in Ntumbo, Ndu, after accusing separatists of killing seven Fulanis.
- On 14 May, one Cameroonian soldier was killed in a battle with separatist fighters in Nkambé, Donga-Mantung. A member of a local vigilante militia was also seriously injured.
- On 19 May, one of the imprisoned members of the original cabinet of the Interim Government of Ambazonia, Barrister Shufai, who had been transferred to a hospital four days prior, was chained up and mistreated by guards. Shufai had been transferred to the hospital following 10 days of deteriorating health, and was unconscious when he arrived. He was then sent back to Kondengui Central Prison, despite the fact that he was immunocompromised and the risk of getting COVID-19 in a crowded prison. His treatment was condemned by his lawyers and by Human Rights Watch.
- On 20 May, Cameroon celebrated its annual Unity Day. Separatists had already announced a lockdown from 19–21 May, and fighters patrolled public places during the holiday to enforce the lockdown. According to the Cameroonian military, six people were killed in clashes in the preceding week. Separatists claimed to have abducted nine or more people who had watched the celebrations on TV. In Bamenda, the Cameroonian Army claimed to have discovered and disarmed several improvised explosive devices.
- On 24 May, the Cameroonian military set up a military base in Ngarbuh, with the stated aim of cutting off a separatist supply route from Nigeria. Within a week, more than 300 villagers had fled, fearing the presence of soldiers and a repeat of the Ngarbuh massacre.
- On 28 May, Cameroonian soldiers killed four unarmed men in Buea. Another person was killed by soldiers in Mbiame.
- On 30 May, according to Human Rights Watch, separatists abducted and maltreated a humanitarian worker whom they accused of being a spy. The worker was released the next day. In Bambui, separatists abducted seven staff members of a religious non-profit organization; they were released after two days.

== June ==
- On 1 June, at least five Cameroonian soldiers were killed in a separatist ambush in Otu, Manyu. An unspecified number of soldiers were also wounded in the ambush. The area had been controlled by separatists since 2018, and Cameroon had attempted to reestablish its presence there.
- On 2 June, it was reported that Pidgin journalist Samuel Wazizi had died at a military hospital after being tortured by Cameroonian soldiers. Wazizi had been arrested on 3 August 2019 in Buea over alleged ties with separatists, which he had denied. Cameroonian authorities confirmed Wazizi's death three days after the initial reports. In a statement, the Cameroonian government reiterated the accusation that Wazizi had cooperated with separatist elements, and attributed his death to "severe sepsis". In Malende, Kumba, the Cameroonian Army carried out an operation to expel separatists from the area. According to Cameroon, seven separatists were killed as the Cameroonian Army overran their base.
- On 3 June, Cameroonian soldiers killed three separatist fighters in Ndop.
- On 5 June, separatist fighters killed a gendarmerie commander in Njikwa.
- On 7 June, separatists and Cameroonian soldiers clashed in Bamenda. Following the clashes, the separatists set up road blocks in the Mile 90 neighborhood.
- On 10 June, unidentified gunmen killed five people in Eshobi, Manyu. No armed group claimed responsibility for the killings.
- On 12 June, Cameroonian soldiers killed six separatist fighters and at least five civilians in Mbokan, Jakiri.
- On 15 June, Cameroonian soldiers killed three separatists in Muyuka and took another two prisoner.
- On 16 June, armed men claiming to be separatists killed five people in Eshobi, including the chief of the village, after accusing them of assisting Cameroonian forces.
- On 17 June, Cameroonian Brig. Gen. Valere Nka announced that the Cameroonian Army had killed 24 separatist fighters in two separate operations the past few days; 11 in Mbokam, and 13 in Bali, Batibo and Widikum. During the four days of fighting, the Cameroonian Army lifted a blockade of the Bamenda-Enugu Road, where rebels had extorted money from travellers. Separatists condemned the blockade and denied having anything to do with it. The Cameroonian Army claimed to have suffered one dead and one wounded during the battles. In Ngarum, Ndu, Cameroonian soldiers killed two civilians.
- On 19 June, Cameroonian troops killed separatist commander "General Obi" in Mamfe.
- On 20 June, two explosive devices detonated in Cameroon's capital Yaoundé. Five months prior, the Cameroonian police had warned that separatists might try to carry out bombings in the capital. However, no one claimed responsibility for the attacks. Following the explosions, security forces started raiding houses in neighborhoods where displaced Anglophones were living. In the following days, many Anglophones accused the authorities of abuses.
- On 22 June, separatists imposed a three-day lockdown all across the Anglophone regions. This was done in response to Cameroonian plans to begin rebuilding the Anglophone regions with the support of the UNDP, titled "Presidential Programme for the Reconstruction and Development" (PPRD). The UNDP and aid agencies later denied being involved with the plan, stressing their neutrality.
- On 28 June, Cameroon carried out a military operation in Ngock-Etunja.
- By the end of June, The Africa Report reported that Cameroon had largely pushed the separatists out of Buea, where there had been much fighting back in 2018. Separatist militias in Northwest Region suffered heavy losses during operations in June, and a source in the Cameroonian military claimed that Cameroon would soon win the war.

== July ==
- On 1 July, separatist fighters set up road blocks and clashed with Cameroonian soldiers in Buea. Clashes continued into the next day.
- On 2 July, following international pressure for a global ceasefire to deal with the COVID-19 pandemic, Cameroonian officials met with the imprisoned leaders of the Interim Government of Ambazonia to discuss a ceasefire. Ayuk Tabe confirmed that a meeting had taken place, adding that he remained loyal to the separatist cause. When asked about his conditions for a ceasefire, Ayuk Tabe listed three; that it would be announced by President Paul Biya, that the Cameroonian military would pull out of the Anglophone regions, and a general amnesty for separatists. News of the negotiations got a mixed reception in diaspora-based separatist movements. The faction of the Interim Government loyal to Samuel Ikome Sako dismissed the talks and argued that prisoners cannot negotiate, whole the AGovC attributed the talks to a Cameroonian scheme to deceive the UN. In Yaoundé, two people were injured after an improvised explosive device detonated, and the city's administrative officer suggested that the bomb came from the Anglophone regions.
- Between 3–5 July, 17 separatist fighters and at least one Cameroonian soldier were killed in "Operation Ngoke-Bui", a series of Cameroonian raids on separatist bases in Ngo-Ketunjia.
- On 4 June, Cameroonian soldiers killed one person in Tombel. In Santa, separatist fighters burned a truck loaded with products en route Bamenda.
- On 7 July, separatist fighters abducted two men in Ndop, whom they accused of collaborating with the Cameroonian Army. Both were killed the next day.
- On 9 July, separatist fighters killed a health worker they had abducted the previous day. The faction of the Interim Government of Ambazonia loyal to Sako condemned the act.
- On 11 July, separatist fighters ambushed and killed one police officer and wounded another three in Bamenda.
- On 13 July, a separatist militia known as the "Gorilla Fighters" led by "General Ayeke" abducted 63 civilians from Mmuock Leteh, Lebialem. 25 of them were released the next day, and the rest were released on 15 July. At least some of the civilians paid ransom to secure their release. One anonymous hostage said that they had been maltreated.
- Between 13–19 July, the Cameroonian Army carried out raids in Awing and Pinyin, killing at least 15 separatist fighters, including a general known as "General Okoro". Another separatist general, "Bush General", was taken prisoner.
- On 20 July, suspected separatists abducted a teacher in Bamenda.
- On 26 July, suspected separatists killed a truck driver in Buea.
- On 30 July, at least one person was killed during clashes in Bamenda.
- On 31 July, three separatist fighters were killed during a failed ambush on Cameroonian soldiers in Santa.

== August ==
- On 3 August, separatist fighters killed a civilian in Bamenda, whom they accused of being a traitor.
- On 6 August, separatist fighters killed a pastor in Batibo. In Buea, a man who had been imprisoned and tortured without trial since 2017, died in captivity.
- On 7 August, unidentified armed men abducted and killed an aid worker in Batibo. The killing was condemned by OCHA.
- On 9 August, a separatist militia known as the "Black Hearts of Banga Bakundu" attacked a military convoy in Meme. In Bamenda, suspected separatists murdered a teacher.
- On 11 August, a video emerged of a person being tortured and killed by armed men in Muyuka. The act was met with widespread condemnation from human rights agencies, as well as from the major separatist movements.
- On 14 August, villagers killed 17 separatist fighters in Nguti, Koupé-Manengouba. A local separatist leader identified those killed as rogue separatists.
- On 17 August, separatists blocked a road in Limbe for several hours and captured a gendarme. In Muyuka, Cameroonian soldiers killed two children and burned down houses.
- On 18 August, the authorities banned the sale of machetes and iron rods in the Anglophone regions, with exceptions for farmers and builders.
- On 19 August, it was reported that more than 130 ex-separatist fighters had escaped from re-integration centers. According to local newspapers, a number had re-joined the separatist ranks.
- On 27 August, unidentified armed men abducted 15 people from Ekok, Eyumodjock, a village near the Nigerian border. According to Cameroonian authorities, the abducted included a number of Nigerian citizens.
- On 31 August, Cameroon concluded a six-day military offensive in Fundong, Boyo, titled "Operation Boyo I". 17 separatist fighters were killed and another seven were captured when the Cameroonian Army raided their bases in the area. The Cameroonian soldiers also seized locally produced weapons.

== September ==
- On 1 September, separatist fighters killed a police officer in Bamenda. Police forces responded by destroying shops and shooting indiscriminately, forcing people to stay indoors. In the following days, hundreds of people were detained, and locals accused the military of atrocities. Elsewhere in Bamenda, separatist fighters killed a police officer.
- On 5 September, soldiers from the Rapid Intervention Battalion killed Ambazonian general Luca Fonteh, known as the nom de guerre "General Mad Dog", in Bamenda.
- On 6 September, six suspected separatist fighters were arrested by civilians and handed over to the authorities.
- On 8 September, Cameroon launched Operation Bamenda Clean, with the official aim of protecting the population of Bamenda against separatist attacks. Following the announcement, some local civilians accused Cameroonian soldiers of extortion.
- On 9 September, an Anglophone detainee died while imprisoned by Cameroonian authorities.
- On 10 September, a Cameroonian soldier was killed during clashes with separatists in Bamenda.
- On 14 September, at least two Cameroonian soldiers and a civilian were killed when their vehicle hit an improvised explosive device in Bongongo. In Bamenda, two people were summarily executed by Cameroonian soldiers.
- On 21 September, Cameroonian soldiers summarily executed five civilians in Ngongham, Bamenda.
- On 22 September, Cameroonian soldiers killed six civilians in Buea, allegedly for not showing them the locations of separatist hideouts. In Yaoundé, the Cameroon Renaissance Movement (MRC) led by Maurice Kamto organized a demonstration to protest the government's plan to hold regional elections on 6 November. The MRC and Kamto argued that no elections could be held while the war in the Anglophone regions continued. The government outlawed the protest and deployed soldiers and riot police to quell it, arresting several demonstrators and surrounding Kamto's home. Another protest was held in Douala, where two protesters were killed, over 300 were arrested and over a hundred were wounded.
- On 26 September, Cameroonian soldiers summarily executed a person from Bui.
- On 28 September, Cameroon announced that over the last four days it had expelled separatist fighters from at least a hundred schools across the Anglophone regions, with the aim of reopening schools on 5 October. At least nine separatist fighters and at least two Cameroonian soldiers died during the fighting.
- In late-September, the Biafra Nations Youth League (BNYL), which operated in the Bakassi Peninsula, declared that it had allied itself with Ambazonia.

== October ==
- 1 October marked the three-year anniversary of Ambazonia's declaration of independence. To commemorate the occasion, separatist fighters raised flags in several areas in the Anglophone regions, including in Buea. Celebrations were also held in Lebialem. Anglophone refugees in Nigeria also celebrated the independence day. Cameroon sent reinforcements to stop the celebrations, and clashes were reported in Bui, Momo and Boyo.
- On 6 October, several teachers were abducted by alleged separatists in Bamenda.
- On 10 October, a separatist fighter was killed by alleged government-sponsored Fulani militants in Ngarbuh, Ndu. Separatist fighters pursued and captured one of the militants, who then revealed the identities of two others who were subsequently hunted down and captured as well.
- On 11 October, Cameroon initiated a three-day offensive against separatists in Wabane, Lebialem. Two days later, it was revealed that Cameroonian forces had killed "General Ayeke", commander of the "Gorilla Fighters" militia, in Besali, Wabane, Lebialem. Some 13 hostages were freed from the separatist camp, which was subsequently destroyed. One Cameroonian soldier was killed during the same incident, and the operation was described as "bloody", although the other separatist fighters at the base were reported to have escaped. The corpse of "General Ayeke" was flown to Kumba where it was publicly displayed. In total, three Cameroonian soldiers and at least 12 separatists died during the three-day offensive.
- On 16 October, Cameroonian troops freed 11 hostages from a separatist camp in Lebialem. The camp was reportedly run by a separatist commander named Agbor Oscar Nkeng.
- On 21 October, according to local sources in Ndop, soldiers started forcing children to go to school, often through violence and threats. The same day, separatist fighters abducted five teachers.
- On 24 October, the Kumba school massacre took place, with 10–12 gunmen killing 7 children and wounding another 13. No one claimed responsibility for the attack, and the Cameroonian government and the separatist movements blamed each other.
- On 26 October, Cameroonian forces reportedly killed a separatist commander known as "General Mendo Ze" in Fako Division.
- On 27 October, a teacher was killed in Bamenda.
- On 29 October, the Cameroonian government announced that the BIR had identified and killed the separatist leader responsible for the Kumba school massacre three days prior.

== November ==
- On 2 November, Cameroonian soldiers killed three civilians in Bali. Soldiers also invaded Small Babanki and Bafut, burning down several houses.
- On 3 November, suspected separatists kidnapped all students and teachers from a school in Kumbo. They released all the students soon afterwards. Armed men also attacked the Longla Comprehensive College in Bamenda.
- On 4 November, armed men attacked a school in Limbe, abusing students and teachers and setting fire to buildings before retreating. The BIR attempted to intervene, but arrived too late.
- On 5 November, a separatist militia known as the "Bui Warriors" abducted the Fon of Nso and ten other people who were travelling with him to Kumbo, including Cameroon's sole catholic cardinal. Most were released the next day, while the Fon was held for five days. The militia conditioned the Fon's release on the release of several Ambazonian prisoners, including Ayuk Tabe. After five days, the Bui Warriors declared that they had released the Fon after he had agreed to go to Yaoundé and to stay out of the politics of the Anglophone regions. The Bui Warriors also said that "he shall be making his triumphant home coming to Nso when the moment shall have been ripped". The cardinal who was abducted alongside the Fon, himself a supporter of a united and federal Cameroon, later wrote a book about the incident and argued that the separatists would probably lay down their weapons if the army was confined to barracks and a general amnesty was declared.
- On 6 November, armed men killed the traditional ruler of Liwuh La Malale, Muea, Buea, and burned down his palace. While Cameroon blamed the separatists, no one claimed responsibility for the attack. Following the murder, hundreds of civilians fled from the town. In Mamfe, clashes were recorded.
- On 8 November, Cameroonian soldiers killed two civilians in Luh, Ndu.
- On 9 November, at least eight people were abducted by armed men in Limbe. The abductors soon released a pregnant woman and a teenager, while keeping the others in captivity. They were rescued by security forces after a day.
- On 14 November, a teacher and a student were wounded during an attack on a school in Mamfe.
- On 18 November, two soldiers were killed in a separatist ambush in Bui. A civilian also died after getting caught in the crossfire.
- On 19 November, two people were injured in a bombing in Douala. The local police said that the attack was carried out similarly to bombings in Yaoundé.
- On 20–21 November, separatists attacked several military convoys. According to local sources, at least four soldiers were injured and five military vehicles were damaged in Kumbo.

== December ==
- On 4 December, separatist forces started enforcing a four-day lockdown aimed at disrupting the 6 December regional election.
- On 5 December, there were clashes in Buea.
- On 6 December, Cameroon held its first-ever regional election. The SDF and the MRC boycotted the election due to the ongoing to war. Separatists had promised to prevent the election from taking place, while Cameroon has deployed additional troops. Throughout the day, there were shootouts in Bamenda as separatists moved to sabotage the election. A number of people were shot, and one CPDM Councilor was killed after getting caught in the crossfire during a shootout between separatist fighters and police forces. In Kumbo, separatist fighters entered a church and held the occupants hostage. There were also clashes in Buea. In Babessi, a separatist fighter was ambushed and killed in his home by soldiers.
- On 8 December, Cameroonian authorities suspended all Doctors Without Borders activities in the Anglophone regions, accusing the organization of being "too close" with separatist groups.
- On 12 December, the Fon of Small Babanki was abducted by gunmen. In Bambalang, there were clashes between Cameroonian forces and the Bambalang Marine Forces.
- On 13 December, three traditional rulers were abducted by armed men. One of them, the Chief of Mile 14-Dibanda, was found dead hours later.
- At some point in late-December, there were armed clashes and explosions, and an eight-year-old was killed when he got caught in the crossfire between Cameroonian troops and separatist fighters.
- On 31 December, separatist fighters ambushed a soldier in Wum.
- In his end-of-year speech, Samuel Ikome Sako of the Interim Government of Ambazonia declared that an All Ambazonia Constitutional Draft Conference would be held during 2021, and that Northerst and Southwest Region would be reorganized into Equatorial Zone, Midland Zone and Savanna Zone. Sako also said that the separatists were purchasing more weapons and that the fight would continue. Meanwhile, President Paul Biya thanked the population of the Anglophone regions for assisting the government in the fight against separatists, and called on other countries to crack down on separatist activities in the diaspora.
