= List of Ambazonian militant groups =

Known insurgent factions in the Anglophone Crisis

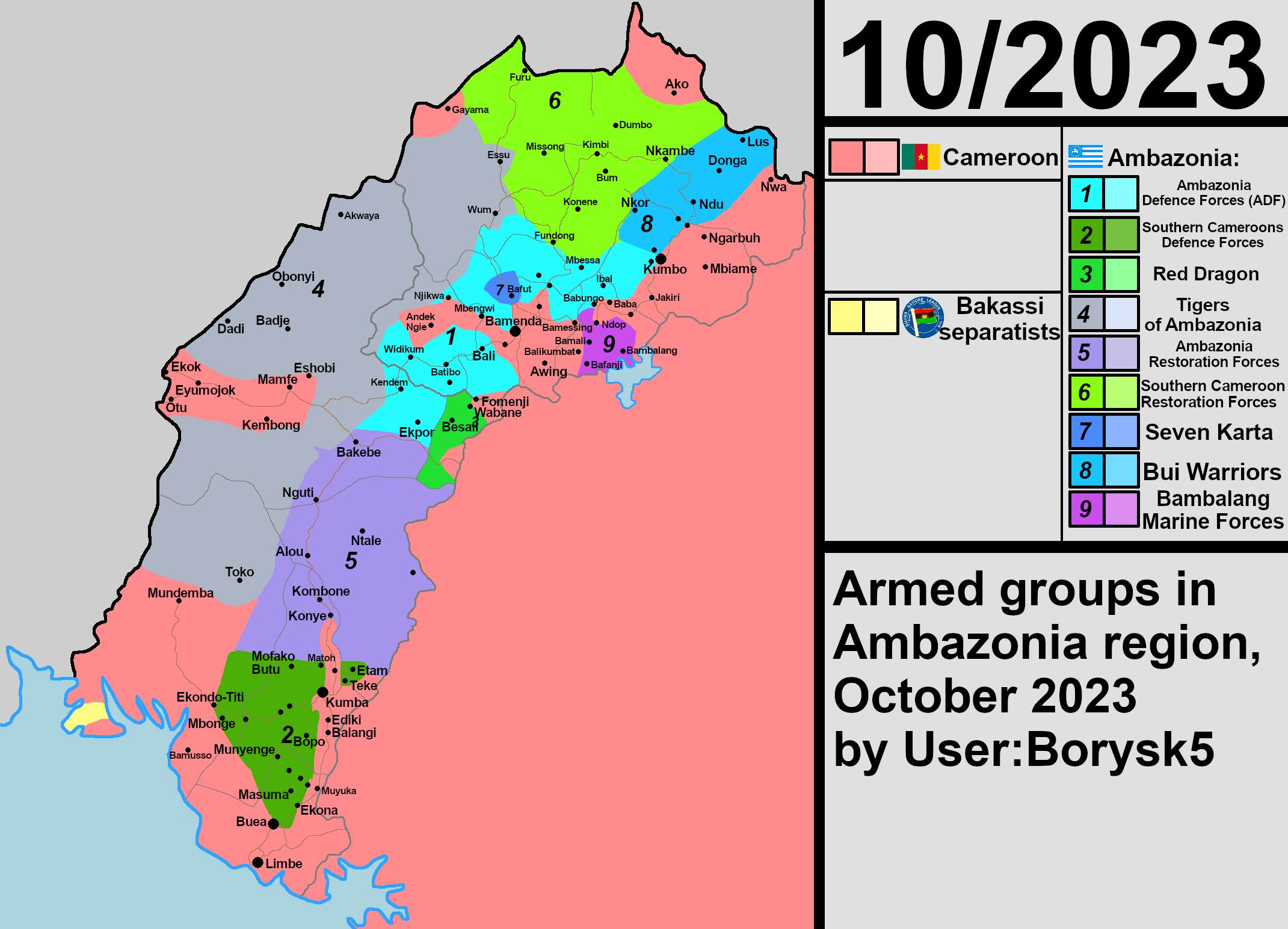
Map of military situation in Ambazonia region

Following is a list of militant groups fighting for the independence of Ambazonia, commonly referred to locally as "Amba Boys", in the Anglophone Crisis. It should be recalled that there are other groups involved but their tactics remain nonviolent. Due to the obscure nature of many of the smaller groups, this list will remain incomplete until more information becomes available.

Many Ambazonian rebel groups and their commanders take symbolic names which reference animals or specific personal traits; these are used to evoke fear and respect.

== List ==
Name of group	Part of (if applicable)	Political allegiance (if applicable)	Commander(s)	Strength
Alou Guerilla Fighters	?	?	"General Ayekeah" †	?
Al-Qaeda Squad of Meme	?	?	Ndiba Lenya Clifford ("General Lucifer" or "Field Marshall Lucifer") †	?
Ambaland Forces	N/A	?	?	10–30 (by 2018)
Ambaland Quifor	?	?	Silas Zama	200 (by 2019)
Ambazonia Dark Forces	?	?	Capo Daniel	?
Ambazonia Defence Forces (ADF)	N/A	Ambazonia Governing Council (in turn allied with the Ayuk Tabe loyalist faction of the Interim Government since 2020)	Ayaba Cho Lucas; Benedict Nwana Kuah; Ivo Mbah † "General Efang" ("Big Number"); Capo Daniel (formerly) "Major General King Commando" "General Manboy" "General Cross and Die" † "Colonel John" † "General Rasta" †; Orock Valentine aka "General Mbula" † "General Abakwa" † "General Sumanguru" "General Weapon" †	200–500 (by 2019)
Ambazonia Intelligence Forces	Ambazonia Self-Defence Council	?	?	?
Ambazonia Revolutionary Guards	Ambazonia Self-Defence Council	?	Clement Mbashie aka "General No Pity" † (General No Pity also led the Bambalang Marine Forces and Bui Unity Warriors)	?
Ambazonia Restoration Army	Ambazonia Self-Defence Council	Southern Cameroons Liberation Council (Interim Government)	Paxson Agbor	a few dozen (by 2019)
Ambazonia State Army (ASA)	Bui Warriors	Interim Government of Ambazonia (Sako faction)	"General Talk and Do"	?
Bambalang Marine Forces	Ambazonia Self-Defence Council	?	Clement Mbashie aka "General No Pity" † (General No Pity also led the Ambazonia Revolutionary Guards and Bui Unity Warriors); Sylvester Mbashie aka "General Shina Rambo" (surrendered); Henry Njimbogwe aka "General No Mercy" † (General No Mercy also led the Bui Unity Warriors)	?
Asawana	?	?	?	?
Black Cats	?	?	?	?
Black Hearts of Banga Bakundu	?	?	?	?
Black Lions of Bamali	?	?	"General Kolambo"	?
Black Mambas	?	?	?	?
Black Shoes of Oku	?	?	?	?
Banso Resistance Army	?	?	?	?
Buffaloes of Bali	?	Unclear, but fought against ADF militia of "Big Number"	?	?
Bui Unity Warriors	Unclear^{[a]}	?	Clement Mbashie aka "General No Pity" † (General No Pity also led the Ambazonia Revolutionary Guards and Bambalang Marine Forces) "General Mad Dog of Bui"; Henry Njimbogwe aka "General No Mercy" † (General No Mercy also led the Bambalang Marine Forces) "Commandant Marcel" (POW)	?
Bui Warriors	Ambazonia Self-Defence Council; Southern Cameroons Restoration Forces (General Insobu was General Chacha's successor; Chacha was aligned with the SCRF)	?	"General Insobu" † "General Thunder" †	?
Dongang Mantung self defense group (or "Donga and Mantung liberation forces")	?	?	?	?
Expendables 100	?	?	"General Ten Kobo"	?
Fako Action Forces	?	?	?	?
Fako-Meme Black Tar Council	?	?	Augustine Ambe ("General Above the Law") †	?
Fako Mountain Lions	?	?	"Major General Sagat" †	?
Ground Zero	?	?	Success Nkongho (surrendered)	?
Gorilla Fighters	?	?	"General Ayeke" †	?
Jaguars of Bamessing	?	?	"General Sagard"	?
Menchum Fall Warriors	?	?	?	a few dozen (by 2019)
Manyu Ghost Warriors	Ambazonia Self-Defence Council	Southern Cameroons Liberation Council (Interim Government)	Martin Ashu	500 (by 2019)
Ngoketundjia Defence Council	?	?	?	?
Nso Liberation Army	?	?	?	?
Only Bro	?	Interim Government of Ambazonia (Sako faction)	Ngeh Cyprian ("General The Only Bro") "General A4"	?
Pythons of Boyo	?	?	"General Nyih"	?
Red Dragon	Ambazonia Self-Defence Council "Lebialem Defence Force"	Southern Cameroons Liberation Council (Interim Government)	"Field Marshall" Lekeaka Oliver † "General Ayekeah" † (also head of Alou Guerilla Fighters)	200 (by 2019)
Ribbons of Ambazonia	?	?	Desmond Koa ("General Mad Dog" of Ndian and Meme) † "General Millepede"	?
Seven Karta	Ambazonia Self-Defence Council	Southern Cameroons Liberation Council (Interim Government)	"General Alhaji" † "General Peace Plant" † "One Blood" †	200 (by 2019)
Southern Cameroons Defence Forces (SOCADEF)	Aligned with, but not officially part of, the Ambazonia Self-Defence Council	Southern Cameroons Liberation Council (APLM)	Ebenezer Akwanga; Andrew Ngoe † "General Opopo" (executed) "General Jason"	400 (by 2019)
Southern Cameroons Restoration Forces (also known as "Southern Cameroons Defence Forces," SCDF)	Ambazonia Self-Defence Council	Southern Cameroons Liberation Council (Interim Government)	Nso Foncha Nkem "General RK" "General Chacha" †	100 (by 2019)
Team Retina	?	?	"General Massacre"	?
Ten Cobo	?	?	?	?
Ten-Ten	?	?	"General Ten-Ten"	50 (by 2019)
The Mountain Lions	?	?	?	?
Tigers of Ambazonia (also known as "Manyu Tigers" or "Tigers of Manyu")	Ambazonia Self-Defence Council	Southern Cameroons Liberation Council (Interim Government)	?	c. 500 (by 2019)
The Sword of Ambazonia (TSOA)	?	?	?	200 (by 2019)
Vipers	N/A	?	?	a few dozen (by 2019)
White Tigers	?	?	?	50 (by 2019)
Warriors of Nso	?	?	?	100 (by 2019)
One Touch	?	?	?	?
Isakabas	?	?	?	?
More than 20 unnamed militias as of 2019	?	?	For individual leaders whose affiliation could not be verified, see list of Ambazonian commanders in the Anglophone Crisis.	Hundreds, split into dozens of groups (by 2019)

== Footnotes ==
- ^{1} The Bui Unity Warriors were organized by commanders previously associated with the Ambazonia Self-Defence Council (ASC), but they fight against other groups that were ASC members since early 2022.
