= General Transporter =

Ambazonian rebel leader (died 2023)

- Born: Ayuk Ndifon Defcam; Wame, Meme, Cameroon
- Died: 31 January 2023
- Military career
- Allegiance: Ambazonia
- Branch: Disputed
- Service years: ? – 2023
- Rank: "General"
- Conflicts: Anglophone Crisis

Ayuk Ndifon Defcam, better known by his pseudonym "General Transporter" or "General Transporter of Meme", (Note: Another rebel leader, Sama Elvis Tiamama, also called himself "General Transporter". To differentiate him from Ayuk Ndifon Defcam, Sama Elvis Tiamama was called "General Transporter of Ngo-Ketunjia". In addition, there were a number of minor rebel figures calling themselves "General Transporter", including at Mbalangi and Ekona.) (died 31 January 2023) was an Ambazonian rebel leader. Mainly active in Meme department of Cameroon, he reportedly led one of the larger separatist militias in the region until his death in battle.

== Biography ==
Since 2017, the Northwest Region and Southwest Region of Cameroon are the site of a civil war known as the "Anglophone Crisis" between the Cameroonian government and Ambazonian separatists. Ayuk Ndifon Defcam joined the rebels, rose to command a militia and adopted the pseudonym "General Transporter". Such self-proclaimed titles and pseudonyms are typical for Ambazonian rebel commanders, used to evoke respect and fear.

General Transporter's factional allegiance was disputed. The International Crisis Group described him as commander in the Ambazonia Defence Forces (ADF), the news site Cameroon Intelligence Report described him as a Southern Cameroons Restoration Forces member, whereas the news site Mimi Mefo Info described a video in which he declared allegiance to "SOCADEF" (which is often confused with the Southern Cameroons Restoration Forces). More broadly, he supported the Interim Government of Ambazonia spreading its control in rebel-dominated territories. His militia would attack government targets in Meme, and also engaged in operations along the Mamfe-Kumba road. At the peak of his power, he allegedly commanded "hundreds" of fighters and was a "key Ambazonia commander". In October 2020, the Cameroonian government blamed him for the Kumba school massacre. This was denied by separatists who instead blamed Cameroonian security forces for the school shooting.

General Transporter and an allied insurgent commander, "General Bitter Cola", attacked civilians at Ediki-Mbalangi with clubs in May 2022. The two rebel leaders filmed the assault, declaring it an act of revenge after militiamen from Ediki-Mbalangi had previously aided the Cameroonian security forces. Whereas General Transporter declared the incident a "peace mission", General Bitter Cola openly threatened that "we are not sparing anyone -children, mothers or adults are complicit". In the following July, General Transporter organized a larger attack on government troops at Ikiliwindi, Meme. This led to revenge attacks by the military on the local community. In October 2022, he publicly threatened all Cameroonian soldiers stationed in and around Kumba. Government sources claimed that General Transporter eventually went into hiding at the coast of the Gulf of Guinea, before returning to Konye village near Kumba. There, he reportedly planned new attacks. However, Cameroonian security forces surprised and killed General Transporter alongside one to four of his followers at Konye or Wame on 31 January 2023. The government claimed that several hostages were also freed in the operation. Besides various weapons, a flag of Ambazonia was also found at the site of the rebel leader's demise.

The Cameroonian government portrayed General Transporter's death as a major success and subsequently displayed his corpse to the public at Bicec junction in Kumba. Senior Divisional Officer Ntu'uh Ndong Chamberlain oversaw the display. Locals were generally unimpressed, with one farmer arguing that the military had already killed "like 4 General Transporters and this is the 5th", expressing the belief that one more dead separatist leader changed little. In contrast, ADF deputy commander Capo Daniel honored and lauded General Transporter as "represent[ing] the youths of Ambazonia who have stood up for their rights of self-determination." Several separatists such as Capo Daniel and Vice President Dabney Yerima of the Interim Government of Ambazoonia, called for rebels to avenge the commander. Separatists subsequently carried out a number of revenge attacks in his name across the Anglophone regions.
