= Bombanda raid =

2024 security forces raid in Bombanda, Meme, Cameroon

- Part of the Anglophone Crisis
Date	24 October 2024
Location	Bombanda, Meme, Cameroon
Result	Cameroonian victory

Belligerents
Cameroon	Ambazonia

Commanders and leaders
Onana Gilles Mbarga	Ndiba Lenya Clifford ("General Lucifer") †

Units involved
6th Regional Rapid Intervention Battalion (BIR)	"Al-Qaeda Squad of Meme"

Casualties and losses
Unknown	9 killed

On 24 October 2024, Cameroonian security forces carried out a successful raid targeting the Ambazonian rebel leader Ndiba Lenya Clifford (alias "General Lucifer") in Bombanda, a location in the Mbonge sub-division of Meme department. The operation resulted in Clifford's death, alongside eight of his associates. The local population reportedly assisted the security forces in carrying out the aid, and subsequently approved of Clifford's killing.

== Background ==
Since 2017, the Northwest Region and Southwest Region of Cameroon are the site of a civil war known as the "Anglophone Crisis" between the Cameroonian government and Ambazonian separatists. Meme department in the Southwest Region became one of the insurgency's centres, with various rebel leaders and militias operating in the area. Over time, Ambazonian insurgents increasingly resorted to violent crime, including kidnappings for ransom, to fund their operations. Attacks on civilians also increased.

One of the separatist militias in Meme department fell under the leadership of Ndiba Lenya Clifford who adopted the pseudonyms "General Lucifer" and "Field Marshall Lucifer". Such self-proclaimed titles and pseudonyms are typical for Ambazonian rebel commanders, used to evoke respect and fear. He dubbed his militia the "Al-Qaeda Squad of Meme". The Cameroonian security forces actively sought to eliminate Clifford. In June and July 2023, raids aimed at killing or capturing him; he was wounded in one clash, but escaped alive. However, an associate named "Commander Yong Money" was killed at Mbonge during these operations.

By mid-2024, Clifford's militia became more audacious in its operations. On 8 May, the group attacked a military outpost at Bomana, causing the local security forces to flee. Afterward, the rebels burned the outpost to the ground and released a taunting video in which Clifford (under the alias "Field Marshall Lucifer") mocked the government forces and challenged them to fight him. Later that month, the militia kidnapped 28 people from a church in Bai Panya, claiming that these civilians had cooperated with the Cameroonian government by obtaining identity cards and birth certificates to vote in the next Cameroonian elections. According to Mimi Mefo Info, the "Southwest Region remain[ed] in shock" after this mass kidnapping, especially as Clifford indirectly threatened to kill the victims. The separatist reportedly also imposed taxes on local cocoa traders, harassing or even killing those who did not pay. According to The Guardian Post and Actu Cameroun, Clifford and his "Al-Qaeda Squad" were increasingly perceived by Meme natives as oppressive and disruptive group, causing the civilians to ask for help from the security forces.

== Raid ==
On 24 October 2024, the 6th Regional Rapid Intervention Battalion (BIR) acted on the information provided by the local civilians. A contingent of the battalion under Lieutenant Colonel Onana Gilles Mbarga launched a raid, targeting Clifford's hideout and main base in the small settlement of Bombanda in the Mbonge sub-division. The separatists were surprised by the attack and overrun. Clifford was killed alongside eight associates, including sub-commanders "General Rassman", "General Don Plus", "General Police", "Colonel Viper", "Colonel Doze" and "Commandant Black". Meme's senior divisional officer further stated that the 6th BIR captured 13 weapons, uniforms, and some improvised explosive devices during the operation.

== Aftermath ==
According to The Guardian Post, the defeat of Clifford's militia was greeted with approval by the local population. One cocoa farmer told a radio station that he was finally able to return to tend to his field after the separatists' defeat. Despite Clifford's demise, other separatist leaders continued to be active in Meme department, including at Mbonge. In April 2025, 6th Regional BIR managed to force one of these rebel commanders, "Field Marshal Millipede", to surrender alongside several of his followers.
