= Kurume, Cameroon =

Town and commune in Southwest Region, Cameroon

Coordinates: 4°54′N 9°28′E

Kurume
- Town
- Location in Cameroon
- Country: Cameroon; Ambazonia
- Region: Southwest Region
- Department: Meme
- District: Konye
- Time zone: UTC+1 (WAT)

Kurume is a town and commune in Cameroon located along the Kumba - Mamfe road in the Southwest Region. Kurume is a place in Konye commune, Meme department, Southwest Region, Cameroon. It is located north of the city of Kumba. The inhabitants speak the Bafaw form of the Bafaw-Balong language.
