= Umbrella plant =

The common name umbrella plant can refer to several unrelated species:

- Cyperus alternifolius (umbrella papyrus)
- Darmera peltata (Indian rhubarb)
- Diphylleia cymosa (umbrellaleaf)
- Eriogonum longifolium var. harperi (Harper's umbrella plant or Harper's buckwheat)
- Podophyllum peltatum (American mayapple)
- Heptapleurum arboricola (umbrella tree)

== See also ==
- Umbrella palm
- Umbrella tree
