= Ambaland Forces =

Ambazonian separatist movement

- Founded: 2017

Related articles
- History: Anglophone Crisis

Ambaland Forces are an Ambazonian separatist militia. As of July 2018, it was described as a small "self-defense" group consisting of between 10 and 30 fighters. They tend to cooperate with larger militias, such as the Ambazonia Defence Forces, Southern Cameroons Defence Forces and the Tigers of Ambazonia.

== See also ==
- Communes of Cameroon
