= Vipers (Ambazonian militia) =

- Dates active: 2017 – present
- Country: Cameroon
- Active regions: Babanki-speaking territories, Northwest Cameroon
- Ideology: Ambazonian separatism
- Size: c. 10–30 (2017)
- Part of: Ambazonia
- Wars: Anglophone Crisis

The Vipers are an Ambazonian separatist militia. Described as a local self-defense group, they cooperate with the larger Ambazonia Defence Forces and SOCADEF. The group is centered in Babanki territories.

== History ==
The group was founded early in the Anglophone Crisis, and by December 2017 they commanded between ten and 30 fighters.

The Vipers have claimed responsibility for burning down government buildings. In May 2018, they were blamed for the burning down of an examination center in Bamenda.

The group was described as still being active as of late 2023.
