= General Talk and Do =

Ambazonian rebel leader

- Military career
- Allegiance: Ambazonia (Sako faction)
- Branch: Bui Warriors
- Service years: 2017 – present
- Rank: "General"
- Commands: "Ambazonia State Army" ("Kikaikom Boys")
- Conflicts: Anglophone Crisis

"General Talk and Do" (Note: Another rebel leader called himself "Commander Talk and Do". This figure was active in Bamenda and killed in 2021; he should not be confused with General Talk and Do of Kikaikom.) is an Ambazonian rebel leader. Mainly active in the Bui department of Cameroon, he leads the "Ambazonia State Army", a separatist militia and member of the "Bui Warriors" force. His forces control some territory at Kikaikom since 2018, using their position to tax local traffic as well as ambush government forces as part of the "Anglophone Crisis".

== Biography ==
The man who eventually adopted the pseudonym "General Talk and Do" has claimed that he took part in the peaceful 2016–17 Cameroonian protests, only to be disappointed by the authorities' response. According to one of his audio messages, he was part of a protest march in Kumbo during which protestors had asked the traditional ruler of the Nso people, Fon Sehm Mbinglo II, to listen to their grievances. However, the fon rejected the protestors' demands.

From 2017, the Northwest Region and Southwest Region of Cameroon became the site of a civil war known as the "Anglophone Crisis" between the Cameroonian government and Ambazonian separatists. Having joined the insurgency from the start, "General Talk and Do" gradually rose to a major rebel leader. His self-proclaimed title and pseudonym are typical for Ambazonian rebel commanders, used to evoke respect and fear. General Talk and Do set up his stronghold at Kikaikom in the Kumbo area; his militia was dubbed the "Ambazonia State Army", but also became known as the "Kikaikom Boys". In turn, General Talk and Do's militia was part of the wider "Bui Warriors", a member group of the Ambazonia Self-Defence Council. He and his followers set up a tax for local drivers from the Mbveh Market from 2018, forcing them to pay a toll when moving through rebel areas.

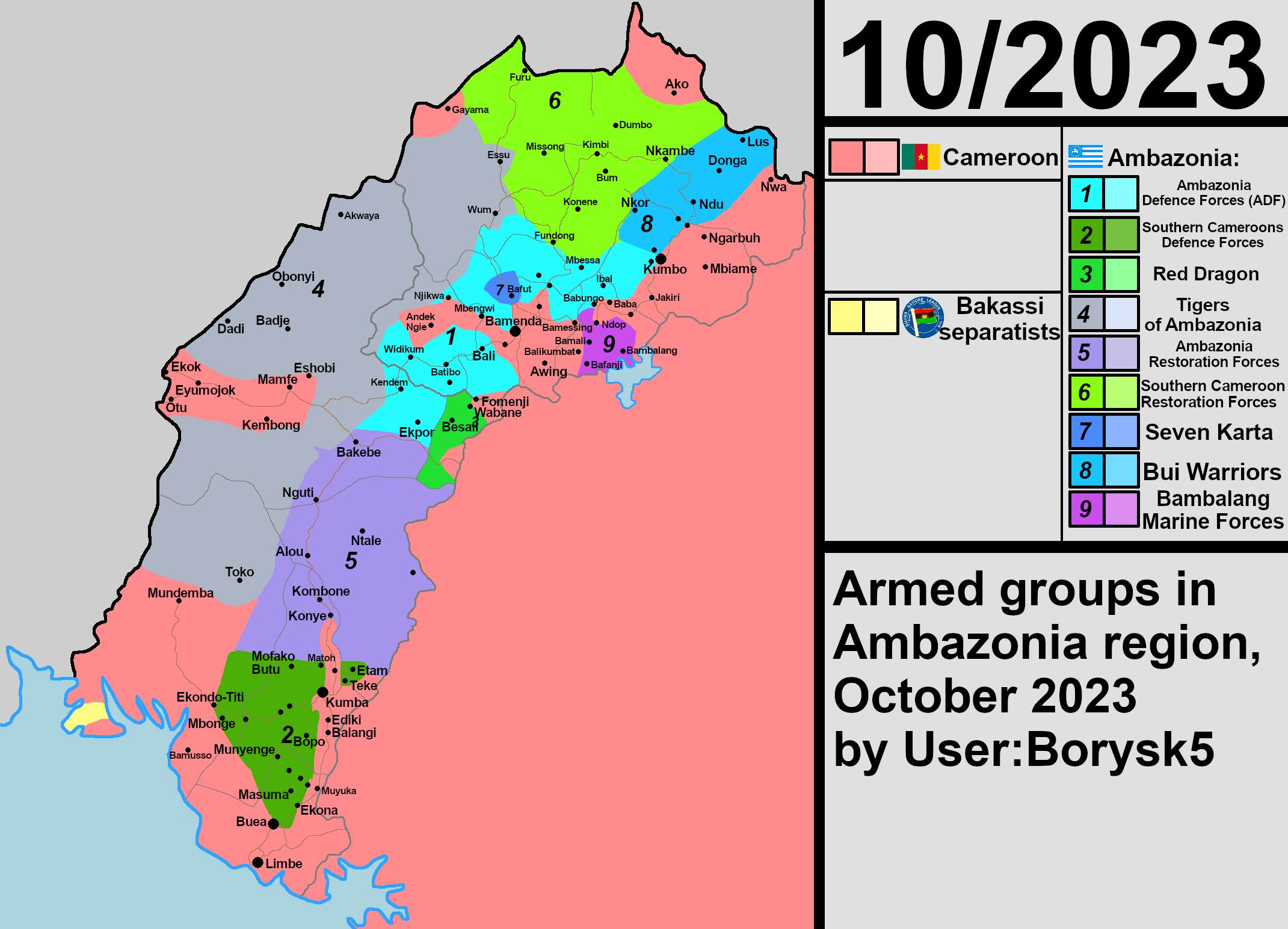
Map of the "Anglophone Crisis" in 2023. Bui Warriors territory (including General Talk and Do's area) is marked in dark blue.

When the Ambazonian leadership crisis erupted, General Talk and Do and the Ambazonia State Army pledged loyalty to the Sako faction of the Interim Government of Ambazonia. In August 2022, the Cameroonian commander Bouba Dobekreo falsely claimed that his forces had killed General Talk and Do. In October 2023, General Talk and Do forbid any civilian traffic on the Tobin-Kumbo road after the Kumbo Council ordered the local drivers to stop paying taxes to the area's separatists.

In January 2024, General Talk and Do declared a lockdown in the Tobin District, declaring that no one was allowed to leave Tobin on the threat of death. He stated that this was a response to new tax system anncounced for Tobin by local officials, with General Talk and Do claiming that this reform was a form of "exploitation within his area of command". Militants linked to General Talk and Do also kidnapped three teachers and several students in June, demanding 2 million Central African CFA francs in ransom money per teacher. In October, General Talk and Do and his militia organized a parade in Kikaikom to celebrate the anniversy of the Ambazonian independence declaration. In November, the Ambazonia State Army carried out an ambush on the Mbaw plain in Ndu, killing a soldier and two civilians. In the same month, General Talk and Do distributed an audio message declaring the Ngonnso festival banned due to the Nso fon Sehm Mbinglo II siding with the Cameroonian government in the Anglophone Crisis.

In March 2025, General Talk and Do commanded an ambush of a joint patrol unit in Mbiame, killing a police officer. In December 2025, Cameroonian security forces launched an operation to retake Mbveh from the forces of General Talk and Do. This led to heavy fighting in the settlement.
