= General The Only Bro =

Ambazonian rebel leader

- Born: Ngeh Cyprian; Bamessing
- Military career
- Allegiance: Ambazonia (Sako faction)
- Service years: ? – present
- Rank: "General"
- Commands: "The Only Bro" group
- Conflicts: Anglophone Crisis

Ngeh Cyprian, better known by his nom de guerre "General The Only Bro", is an Ambazonian rebel leader. He and his militia are mainly active around Bamessing and Kedjom Ketinguh, Ngo-Ketunjia department, in Cameroon. He has become widely known for the kidnappings, torture, and murder of civilians, with his actions also resulting in armed opposition by other separatist forces. Furthermore, journalists, local civilians, and rival rebels have alleged that Cyprian is secretly connected to the Cameroonian government.

== Biography ==
Ngeh Cyprian was a native of Bamessing. He had a history of violence and was ostracized by his own community; Bamessing's Kwifon (traditional council) expelled him from the settlement after he had attacked several people, including a schoolteacher. He relocated to Kedjom Ketinguh, where he eventually became an insurgent. Since 2017, the Northwest Region and Southwest Region of Cameroon have become the site of a civil war known as the "Anglophone Crisis" between the Cameroonian government and Ambazonian separatists.

Having joined the separatist side, Cyprian gradually rose to become the leader of a militia, called "The Only Bro" group, and adopted the nom de guerre "General The Only Bro". Ambazonian rebel commanders have commonly used such self-proclaimed titles and pseudonyms to evoke respect and fear. He set up a base near Bamessing and began to block the Ndop-Bamenda road as well as engage in extortion, kidnapping for ransom, and torture targeting local civilians. He and his militia became infamous for their brutality. In course of the Ambazonian leadership crisis, Cyprian pledged loyalty to the Sako faction of the Interim Government of Ambazonia.

In February 2024, Cyprian's group kidnapped six people for ransom in Bamessing, including some security forces members. In June, Cyprian personally murdered two brothers, claiming that they had worked with the military. Locals instead attributed the killings to personal grievances. In August, Cyprian threatened the people of Bamukumbit with mass kidnappings unless they paid him 12 million CFA franc. He argued that Bamukumbit's inhabitants were pro-government collaborators, as they had chased away his subordinate "General A4".

In January 2025, Cyprian kidnapped a civilian who was subsequently tortured to death, reportedly operating as a hired gun at the time. In February, his militia raided Bamessing where they murdered five civilians, including a newborn. They also attacked a funeral in Kedjom Ketinguh and kidnapped several mourners for ransom. In the same month, the 3rd Rapid Intervention Brigade attacked his camp near Bamessing; he and eight of his followers escaped, but the military reportedly killed two insurgents and captured some equipment during the operation. By autumn 2025, Cyprian's forces were again involved in a series of attacks and kidnappings targeting civilians. The insurgents reportedly executed one civilian at the funeral of his brother in August 2025, and they captured six civilians in Kedjom Ketinguh and demanding 1 million CFA franc each for their release. When the family of one prisoner could not raise enough money, Cyprian's fighters tortured the prisoner nearly to death and left him to die, though he survived.

The activities of Cyprian's group increasingly garnered opposition not just by local civilians, but also by other separatists. In January 2026, Bui-based Ambazonian forces under "Major General Viper" and "Field Marshal Mad Dog" warned him to stop his attacks on civilians before eventually blocking a street leading into his territory in order to pressure him. In response, Cyprian claimed that he was not responsible for the kidnappings, argued that he was willing to restore good relations with the Bui-based rebels, but also warned that he would respond in force if his life was being threatened. In the following month, Cyprian's group kidnapped, tortured and murdered another civilian after his family could not pay the 5 million CFA franc ransom for his release.

== Controversy regarding political alignment ==
An investigation by news site Mimi Mefo Infos discovered that Cyprian's home featured a prominent portrait of Cameroonian president Paul Biya. Local activists have also argued that Cyprian's forces have operated largely with impunity, being mostly ignored by security forces. Mimi Mefo Infos journalists and local analysts thus questioned whether Cyprian was truly loyal to the Ambazonian cause or rather operated to terrorize pro-opposition communities with the government's blessing. Civilians in Bamessing and Kedjom Ketinguh also claimed that Cyprian had cooperated with the security forces to kill a rival separatist named Tum Raymond. Bui-based separatists have also claimed that he coverly cooperates with the Cameroonian government.
