= Umbrella palm =

Umbrella palm is a common name for several plants and may refer to:

- Hedyscepe canterburyana, a palm tree in the family Arecaceae
- Cyperus alternifolius, a sedge in the family Cyperaceae
