= Kumba school massacre =

2020 attack in southwestern Cameroon

- Part of the Anglophone Crisis
- Location: Mother Francisca International Bilingual Academy, Kumba, Meme Division, Southwest Region, Cameroon
- Date: 24 October 2020
- Target: Students and staff
- Attack type: School shooting
- Weapons: Guns, machetes
- Deaths: 8 (one of whom died from his wounds two years later)
- Injuries: 13
- Perpetrator: 10–12 unidentified attackers
- Motive: Unclear

The Kumba school massacre took place at Mother Francisca International Bilingual Academy during the Anglophone Crisis, in Kumba, Cameroon, in October 2020.

== Massacre ==
Around noon on 24 October 2020, men in civilian clothing arrived on motorcycles and stormed the school. With machetes and guns, they killed seven children and injured another 13. Some children were also injured when they jumped from windows to escape. According to an official, the dead children were all between 12 and 14 years old.

According to one of the survivors, there had been twelve attackers, most of whom were dressed in military or police uniforms. A local claimed that the school had been making regular payments to the separatists in the area in return for safety; the school would not confirm this.

== Perpetrators ==
No one claimed responsibility for the attack. Local authorities blamed Ambazonian separatists, while the Cameroonian government and separatist movements accused each other. The Cameroonian government said that around 10 separatist fighters had carried out the massacre, singling out "General Transporter" as the attack's leading figure. The Ambazonia Governing Council quickly claimed to possess evidence that the Cameroonian Army was responsible, while the Interim Government of Ambazonia drew parallels to the Ngarbuh massacre. Cameroonian Communication Minister Rene Sadi strongly denied that the Cameroonian Army had been involved.

Separatists have a history of attacking schools, which some of them regarded as legitimate targets because the French language is taught as a mandatory subject. While students have been abducted and mistreated numerous times throughout the Anglophone Crisis, and several teachers have been killed, the attack on Mother Francisca International Bilingual Academy was the first school massacre to take place during the war.

== Reactions and aftermath ==
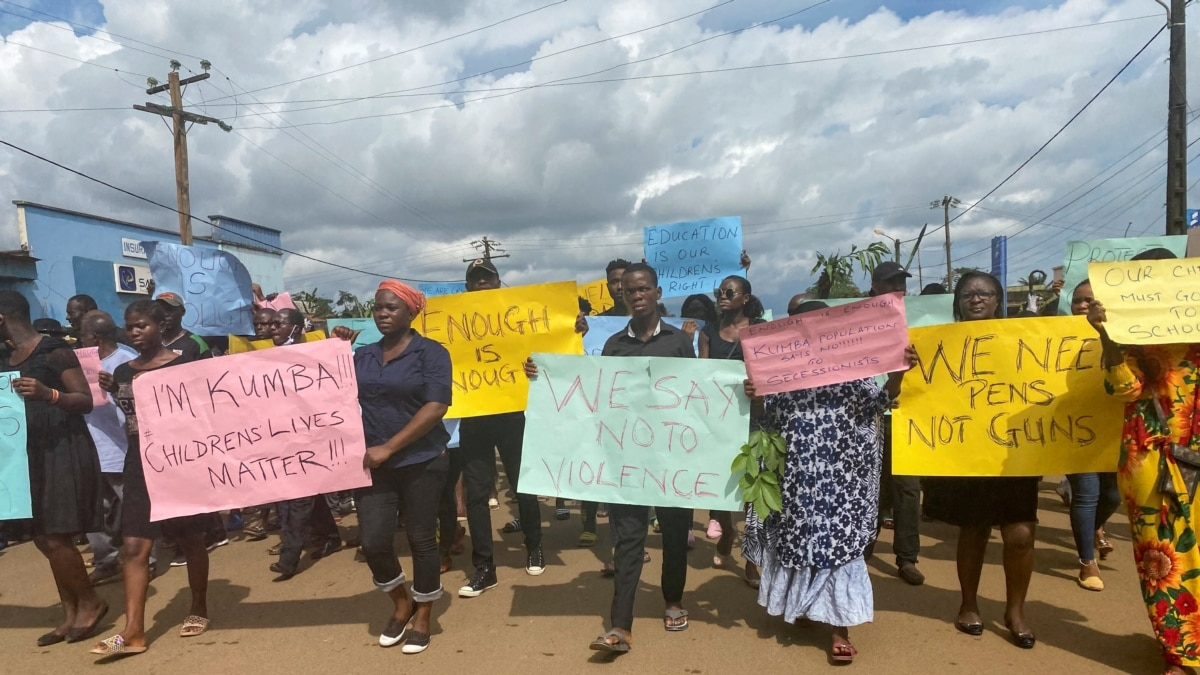
Protest in Kumba against school attacks

The attack was condemned by United Nations Secretary General António Guterres and UNICEF Executive Director, Henrietta Fore. Matthias Z. Naab, the Humanitarian Coordinator in Cameroon, stated that he was "shocked and outraged by the killing of innocent school children which were attending school to get an education". The World Health Organization offered medical supplies to hospitals in the area.

On 28 October, Cameroon's president Paul Biya declared that 31 October would be a day of national mourning, with flags flown at half-mast all day.

On 29 October, Cameroon claimed that the army had identified and killed the separatist commander who was responsible for the massacre, a man known as "Wonke". A month later, a suspected gunman known as "Commander Zabra" was arrested by the police.

After several months in court, four people were sentenced to death by the Buea Military Tribunal for their roles in the massacre on 7 September 2021.
