= Konye, Cameroon =

Town and commune in Southwest Region, Cameroon

Konye
- Commune and town
- Location in Cameroon
- Coordinates: 4°55′21″N 9°27′53″E
- Country: Cameroon
- Region: Southwest Region
- Time zone: UTC+1 (WAT)

Konye is a town and commune in Cameroon located along the Kumba - Mamfe road in the Southwest Region.

== Localities ==
- Kurume, Cameroon
