= Guneku =

Village in Cameroon

Coordinates: 6°02′N 9°59′E

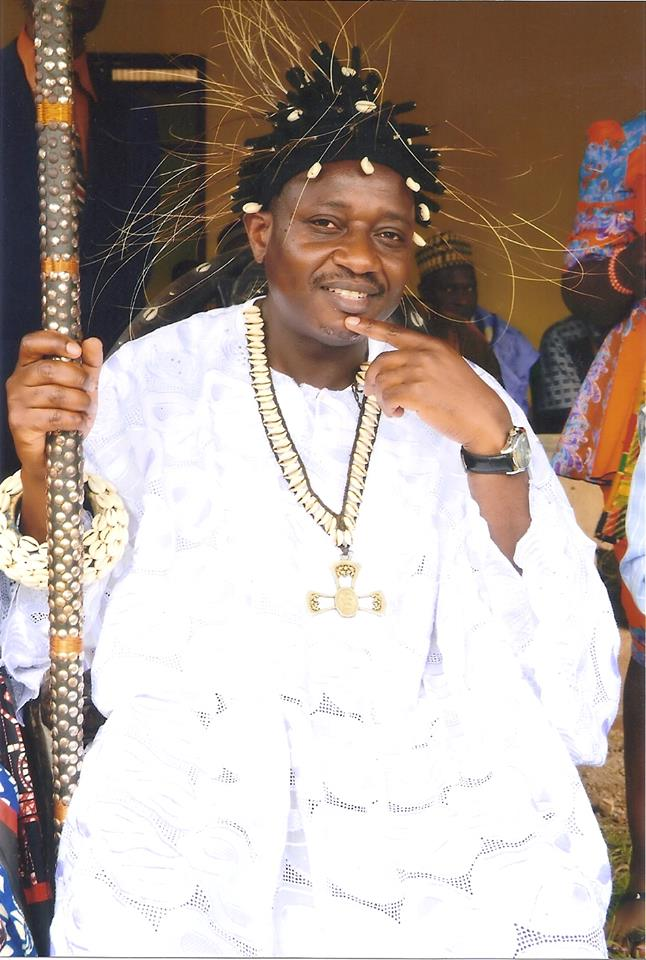
HRH Fon Fomuki Of Guneku

Guneku is one of the villages in Momo Division located in the Northwest region of Cameroon, Central Africa. It has a tropical climate with 2 main seasons; the rainy and dry seasons with a population of approximately 15 000 inhabitants. The main occupations of the inhabitants are subsistence farming, and cattle rearing. Guneku has a lot of touristic sites such as the palace, caves, mountains, waterfalls, hills and valleys, rivers and springs. Guneku is one of the 31 communities that make up the Meta clan sharing boundaries with Mbemi, Nyen, Tugi, Zang-Tembeng, Oshie, Mundum and Bafut. The Bantous and Mbororos are the two tribes that cohabit peacefully in the community.

The community is ruled by a paramount Fon Fomuki (traditional authority) who is the custodian of tradition and all community members are answerable to him. The Fon is the representative of the Central government. There is a community council that makes laws that are used to govern the community and the Fon enforces these laws making sure they are strictly adhered to by everyone in the community. Any defaulters are disciplined accordingly.

Guneku has a dynamic cultural and development association abbreviated GUDECA ( Guneku Cultural & Development Association) that oversees the designing, planning, and implementation of community-based projects. It is made up of an elected committee for a 4-year term with at least 60% youth and female representation. GUDECA has branches in Europe, Canada and America. At the end of each year, the committee produces an annual report of activities and presents it to the community which is the supreme decision body with respect to development issues in the community. In terms of Infrastructure, Guneku has 4 primary schools, one secondary school and a Presbyterian health centre and accessible to Mbengwi and Bamenda towns by road. Only 40% of the community has pipe-borne water and electricity. It is connected to the rest of the world through MTN, Orange and CAMTEL which are the main telephone providers in the country.

At the household level, the father is the head of the household; he takes decisions that affect the entire family. He decides when to take a sick child to a health facility; what portion of the household income should be used for food, education and other basic needs. However, this situation is gradually changing as more women are empowered to be responsible housewives and mothers.

Latitude in degrees, minutes, and seconds (see definition): 6° 01' 45" N

Longitude in degrees, minutes, and seconds (see definition): 9° 58' 51" E

Military Grid Reference System coordinates (see definition): 32NPM0853366530Guneku Weather, Cameroon
