= Umbrella tree =

Umbrella tree may refer to:

- Heptapleurum actinophyllum, the umbrella tree or octopus tree
- Heptapleurum arboricola, the dwarf umbrella tree
- Maesopsis eminii
- Melia azedarach
- Magnolia tripetala, the umbrella magnolia
- Musanga cecropioides, the African corkwood
- Polyscias murrayi, an Australian rainforest tree
- Terminalia catappa, the Indian almond

== See also ==
- Umbrella plant
- Under the Umbrella Tree, a 1986 children's television program
- Pinus pinea, the stone pine, sometimes called "umbrella pine"
- Sciadopitys verticillata, the Kusamaki, sometimes called "Japanese umbrella pine"
