= Mbonge =

- Commune, Town and Tribe
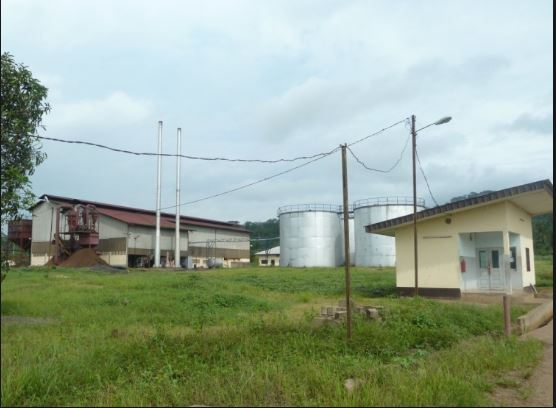

- Location in Cameroon
- Coordinates: 4°32′N 9°06′E
- Country: Cameroon
- Region: Southwest Region
- Department: Meme
- District: Mbonge
- Time zone: UTC+1 (WAT)

Mbonge is a town and capital of the Mbonge Sub-division and a clan in Cameroon. The town derives its name as the chief and first major settlement of the Mbonge clan. It was formerly known as Liène during German rule in Cameroon.

The town is also claimed by Ambazonian separatist as part of the Equatorial State territory.

== See also ==
- Communes of Cameroon
