= Southern Cameroons Restoration Forces =

Cameroon separatist forces

- Founded: 2018/2019

Leadership
- Leaders: Nso Foncha Nkem "General Chacha" † "General RK"

Related articles
- History: Anglophone Crisis

The Southern Cameroons Restoration Forces, also known as Southern Cameroons Defence Forces (SCDF; not to be confused by its namesake, SOCADEF), is an Ambazonian separatist militia. Mainly active in the Boyo Division in Northwest Region, it commanded an estimated 100 fighters as of 2019. The group is led by Nso Foncha Nkem.

In January 2020, the Southern Cameroons Restoration Forces was involved in one of the most serious cases of separatist infighting to date. General Chacha posted a video where he demanded that all separatist militias merge into the Southern Cameroons Defence Forces, threatening to attack separatist militias that opposed him. Around the same time, Chacha's militia abducted 40 fighters from the Ambazonia Defence Forces, six of whom were subsequently murdered.

The infighting came to an abrupt end a week after the abduction incident, when General Chacha and some 20 other fighters were killed when Cameroonian troops attacked their base in Kumbo; this came shortly after an ultimatum issued by Cameroonian Brigadier General Valere Nka. The Cameroonian Army maintained its momentum in Kumbo on the days following the assassination, attacking a number of camps belonging to the Restoration Forces and pursuing retreating fighters.
