= Meme (department) =

- Department
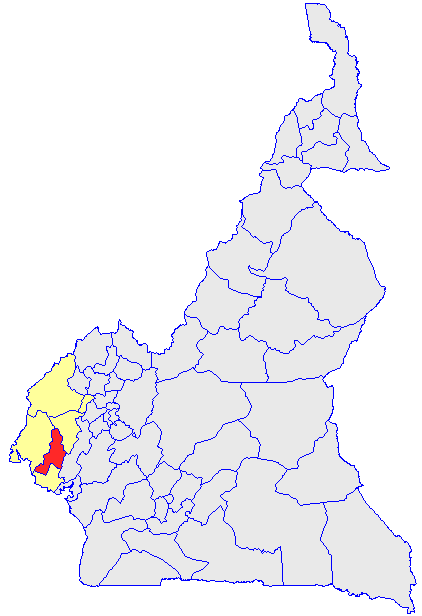
- Department location in Cameroon
- Country: Cameroon
- Region: Southwest Region
- Capital: Kumba

Area
  - Total: 3,105 km^{2} (1,199 sq mi)

Population (2005)
  - Total: 326,734
  - Density: 105.2/km^{2} (272.5/sq mi)
- Time zone: UTC+1 (WAT)

Meme Division is a division in the Southwest Region of Cameroon. The department covers an area of 3,105 km^{2} and as of 2005 had a total population of 326,734. The chief town of the division is Kumba.

== Subdivisions ==
The department is divided administratively into 3 districts and in turn into sub-districts and villages. Central Kumba is further divided into 3 sub-districts; Kumba I, Kumba II and Kumba III.

=== Communes ===
| District | Capital | Area (km^{2}) |
|---|---|---|
| Konye | Konye | 978 |
| Kumba | Kumba | 1,071 |
| Mbonge | Mbonge | 803 |
