= Southern Cameroons Defence Forces =

- Seal of SOCADEF
- Leader: Ebenezer Akwanga
- Dates active: 2017 – present
- Active regions: Meme and Fako
- Ideology: Ambazonian separatism
- Size: c. 400–500 (2019)
- Part of: Ambazonia

The Southern Cameroons Defence Forces (commonly referred to as SOCADEF) is the armed wing of the African People's Liberation Movement, an Ambazonian separatist movement. It is led by Ebenezer Akwanga, who is based in the United States, Together with the Ambazonia Defence Forces, it was one of the most prominent militias fighting in the early Anglophone Crisis. It is mainly active in Meme and Fako.

== History ==
By 2019, SOCADEF claimed that it had 3,500 troops, though the International Crisis Group argued that the militia had at most 500 active armed members. The militia made some headlines in March 2020 when it declared a two-week ceasefire to give people time to get tested for coronavirus.

After suffering major losses in inter-rebel clashes with the Fako Mountain Lions in June 2021, SOCADEF was rumored to have disbanded. In reality, the militia went underground for several months while acquiring better weapons and a new leadership. In October 2021, SOCADEF launched "Operation No Rest For You", targeting Cameroonian troops at Ikiliwindi and reportedly killing nine. In July 2022, rebels under "General Transporter" carried out another attack against security forces at Ikiliwindi; at the time, General Transporter was reportedly loyal to SOCADEF.

== Organization ==
Though Ebenezer Akwanga has served as SOCADEF's head since its foundation, he was living in exile; thus, the group had a series of ground forces commanders who led the troops in the warzone. By 2018, the militia's chief frontline officer was "General Molua C", later replaced by "General" Andrew Ngoe. On January 24, 2019, General Andrew Ngoe was killed in Matoh, Mbonge, leaving Nsom Hilary (alias "General Opobo") in charge. After General Opobo's death at the hands of rival separatists in June 2021, "General Jason" became SOCADEF's new commander.

SOCADEF has not joined the Ambazonia Self-Defence Council, an umbrella organization created by the Interim Government. However, its political wing, the African People's Liberation Movement (APLM), took part in forming the Southern Cameroons Liberation Council in March 2019, effectively uniting with the Interim Government under an umbrella organization.
