= Kumba, Cameroon =

City in Southwest Region, Cameroon

Kumba
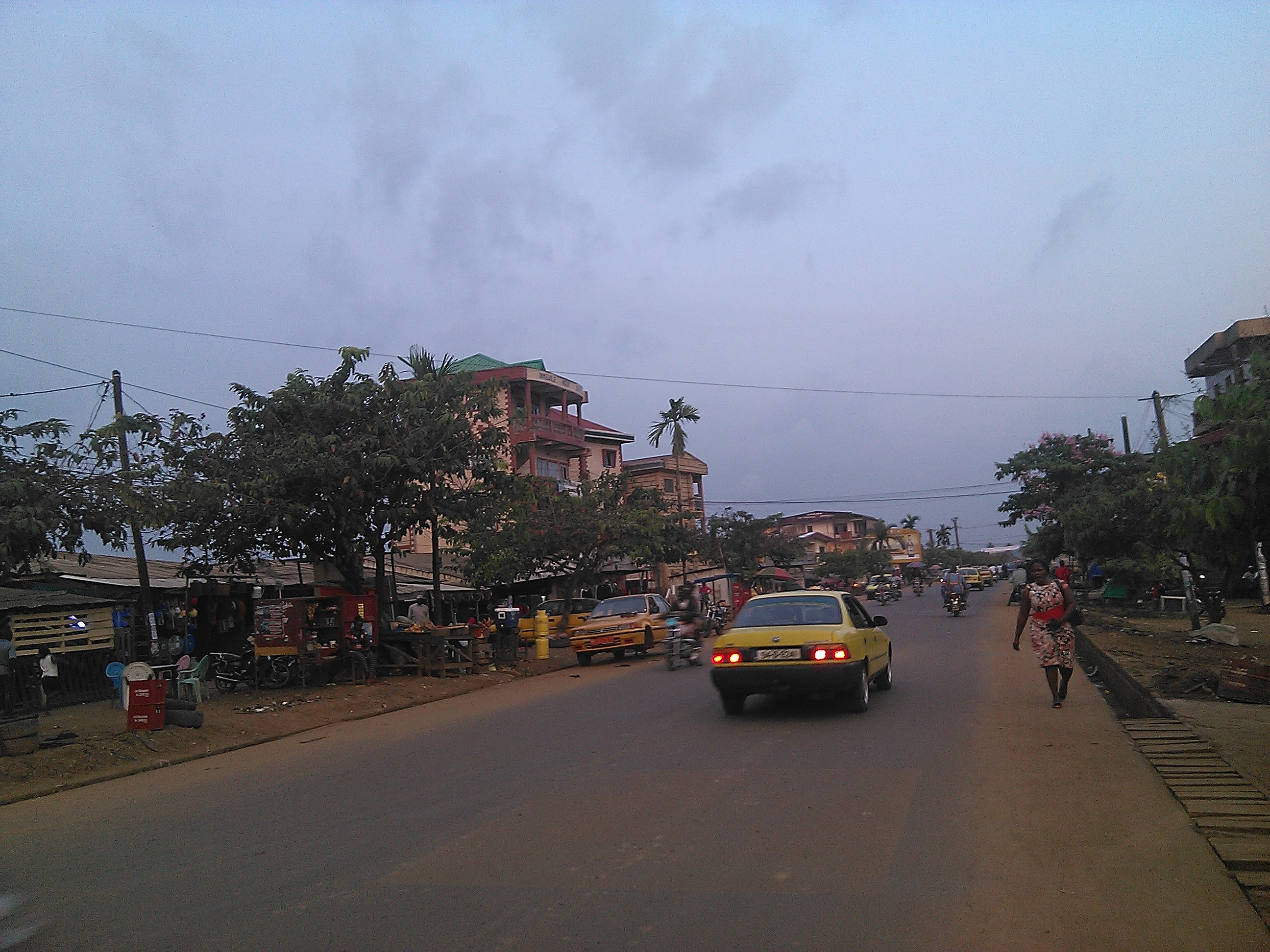
- Kumba
- Motto: "The Green City"
- Location in Cameroon
- Coordinates: 4°38′N 9°27′E
- Country: Cameroon
- Region: Southwest Region
- Division: Meme Division
- District: Central Kumba
- Elevation: 240 m (790 ft)

Population (2025)
  - Total: 300,000

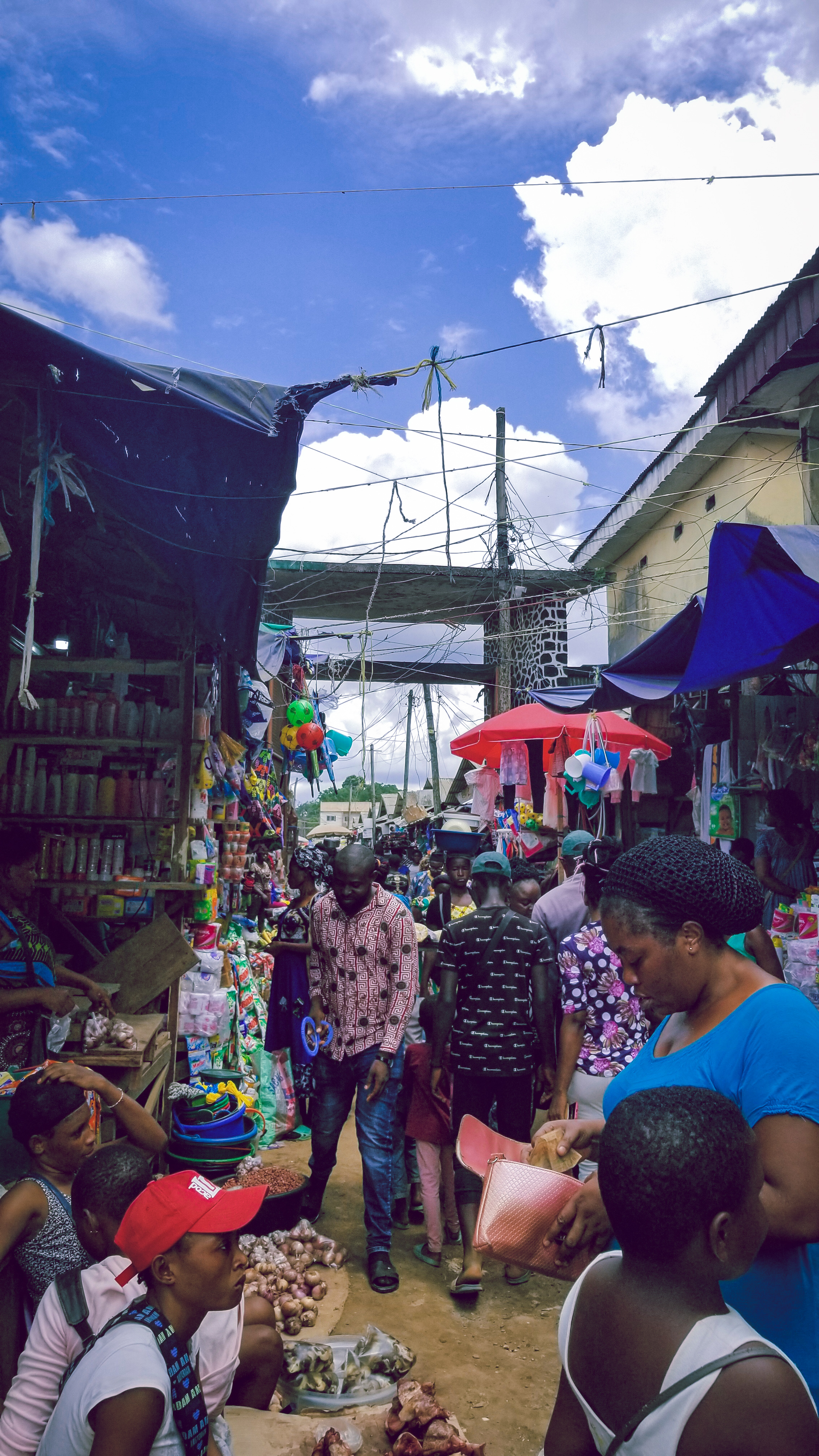
Kumba market

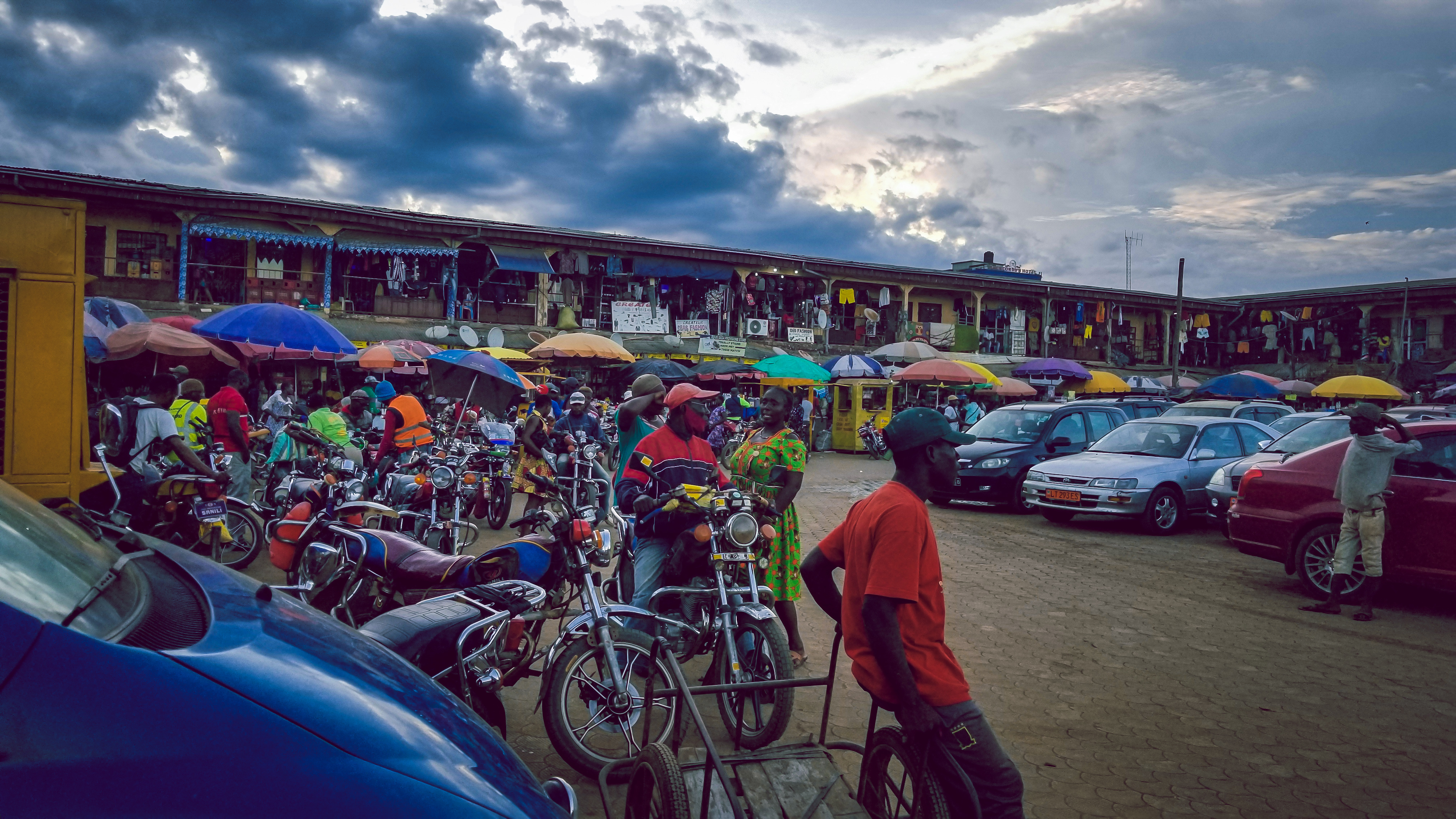
Kumba main park

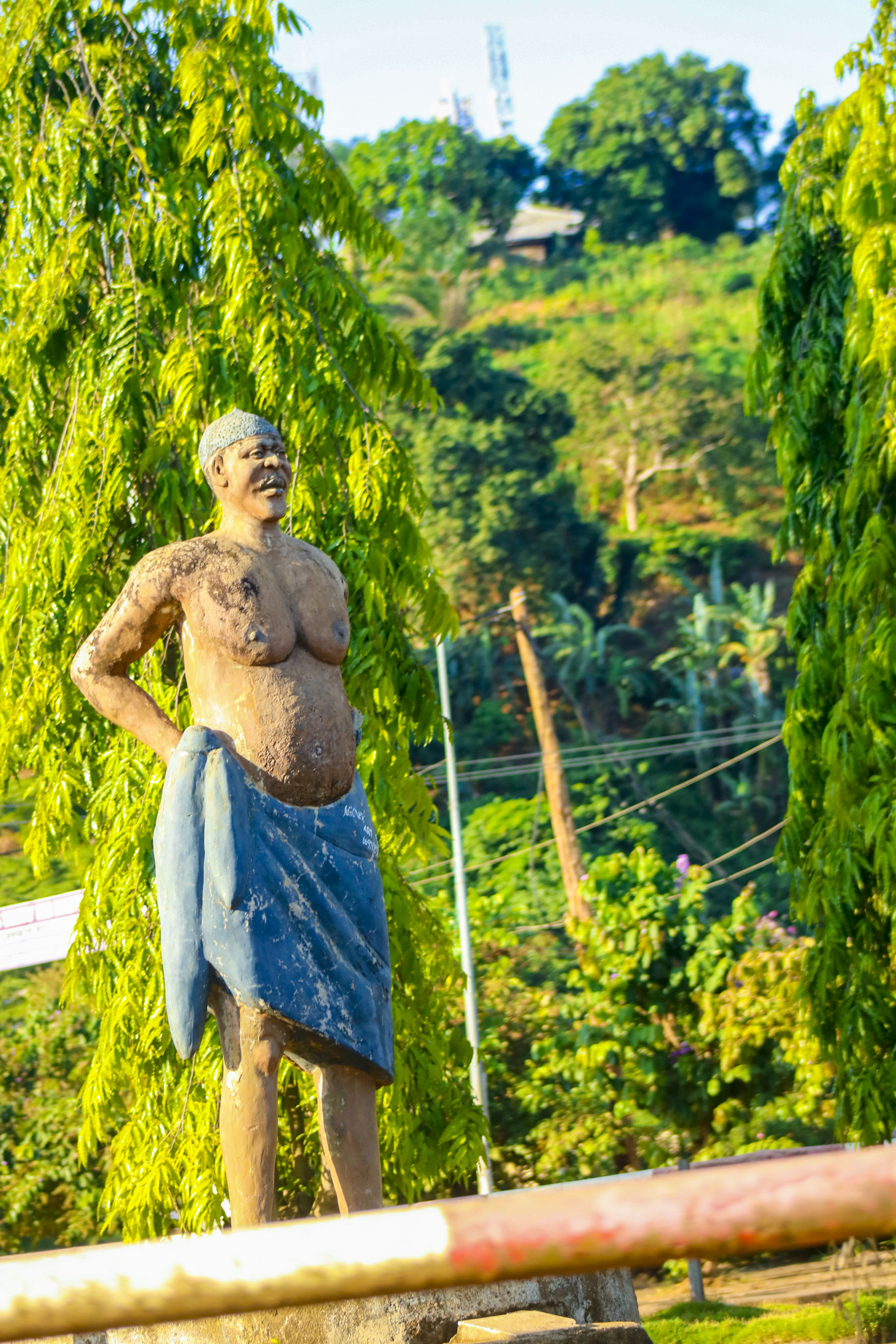
Pa Midiki Bokeng

Kumba is a city in the Southwest Region of Cameroon and the administrative capital of Meme Division. It is one of the largest and most economically significant cities in the Anglophone regions of Cameroon. Known for its vibrant commercial activity, Kumba plays a crucial role as a trade and transportation hub for the Southwest Region, particularly in the agricultural sector.

== Etymology ==
The name 'Kumba' originates from the Bafaw word 'Bakumbè', meaning an umbrella tree

== History ==
Kumba has a rich historical and cultural background, originally inhabited by the Bafaw and Bakundu peoples. Over time, it developed into a significant commercial center due to its strategic location connecting various parts of Cameroon. Its colonial history, particularly under German and later British rule, has shaped its present identity as part of the English-speaking regions of Cameroon.

Kumba has long been an important center for trade and agriculture. Its growth as a commercial town began during the colonial period when Cameroon was under German, and later, British and French rule. The establishment of road networks connecting Kumba to other parts of the Southwest Region, such as Mamfe and Buea, helped solidify its role as a regional hub.

In recent years, Kumba has been impacted by the ongoing Anglophone Crisis, which began in 2016. The conflict between separatist forces seeking independence for the Anglophone regions and the central government has led to significant disruptions in education, business, and local governance.

According to local mythology, Kumba was founded by the hunter Midiki Bokeng, In his honour a monument has been put up around the Town Green. Kumba was originally a Bafo tribal capital formed after the Mediki wars. Mediki was a Bafo native sent by the Bafo chief Nguti to fight other tribes around the settlement which he did successfully. Mediki fought together with Eseme Modu and captured territories as far as Ekombe. The settlement of Kumba was the capital of the former Rio Del Rey Division in German Cameroon and continued to exist into the British period. Abel Mukete, a local Bafo chief, became the head of native authority in the district, beginning in the 1890s and even became the first Paramount Chief in 1929. The title was passed down to his eldest son, John Mukete, and next to Nfon Victor E Mukete (the CEO of Camtel). The chief of Kumba is the paramount chief of the Bafo.

On 24 October 2020, a mass shooting took place at a school, 7 died and 13 were injured.

== Economy ==
Kumba is a major trade center for agricultural products such as cocoa, palm oil, and rubber. It also has a growing timber industry. As a key road junction, Kumba serves as the main commercial hub in Anglophone Cameroon, facilitating trade across the region.

The city is home to two major markets: Kumba Main Market and Fiango Market, and several smaller markets where farmers sell produce directly from their farms. Notable examples include the Mbonge Road Market, Three Corners Market, and the Barombi-kang Market. These markets form the backbone of the local economy, connecting rural producers to urban consumers.

Due to Kumba's vibrant economy and strategic location, the city has attracted traders from Nigeria, particularly the Igbo and Yoruba communities. According to a 2011 survey, Nigerian traders, especially the Igbo and Yoruba, own over 60% of the shops in Kumba. This reflects the city's importance as a regional trade hub, not only for Cameroon but also for neighboring countries.

Trade within the city is regulated by the Kumba City Council, and revenue from market activities forms a significant part of the municipal budget. The Council plays an important role in maintaining order, regulating commerce, and ensuring markets run efficiently.

Agriculture remains the primary occupation for many residents, with farmers producing goods that are exported to various parts of Cameroon and beyond. The city's strategic location and trading activity have drawn traders and businesspeople from across Cameroon and neighboring countries such as Nigeria, Equatorial Guinea, Gabon, and Chad. This cross-border trade further cements Kumba's role as a crucial economic hub in Central Africa.

In summary, Kumba's economy thrives on agriculture and trade, with strong regional and international connections. The combination of local markets, Nigerian traders, and a well-established agricultural sector makes Kumba one of the most commercially active cities in the region.

== Geography ==
Kumba is the largest town in the Meme Division of the Southwest Region of Cameroon and is situated in a mix of flatlands and hilly areas. The town is strategically located at an important road junction, making it a crucial transport and trade hub that connects various parts of the Southwest Region. Roads from Kumba lead to major towns and regions, including Mamfe (towards the Nigerian border), Mundemba (home to the Korup National Park), Buea, and Mount Koupe to the east.

Geographically, Kumba's landscape includes both urbanized flat areas, especially around Buea Road, and more hilly terrain around Fiango and Mbonge Road. This variety in terrain makes the town suitable for a range of activities, from farming to commerce.

One of the town's most notable natural features is Lake Barombi Mbo, located just outside the main city. This lake is the largest volcanic crater lake in Cameroon and a popular attraction for both locals and tourists. It is surrounded by lush forest and is known for its biodiversity, including some endemic fish species.

Kumba Water, a river that runs through the entire city, is another important geographical feature. It flows from the surrounding areas, passing through the heart of the town, and plays a significant role in the local ecosystem and agriculture.

The climate in Kumba is tropical, with a distinct wet season and dry season. The rainy season typically lasts from March to October, contributing to the fertile soil that supports the town's thriving agriculture, including cocoa and other crops.

Kumba's geography, combining flatlands, hills, and water bodies, supports its dual role as an agricultural and commercial center.

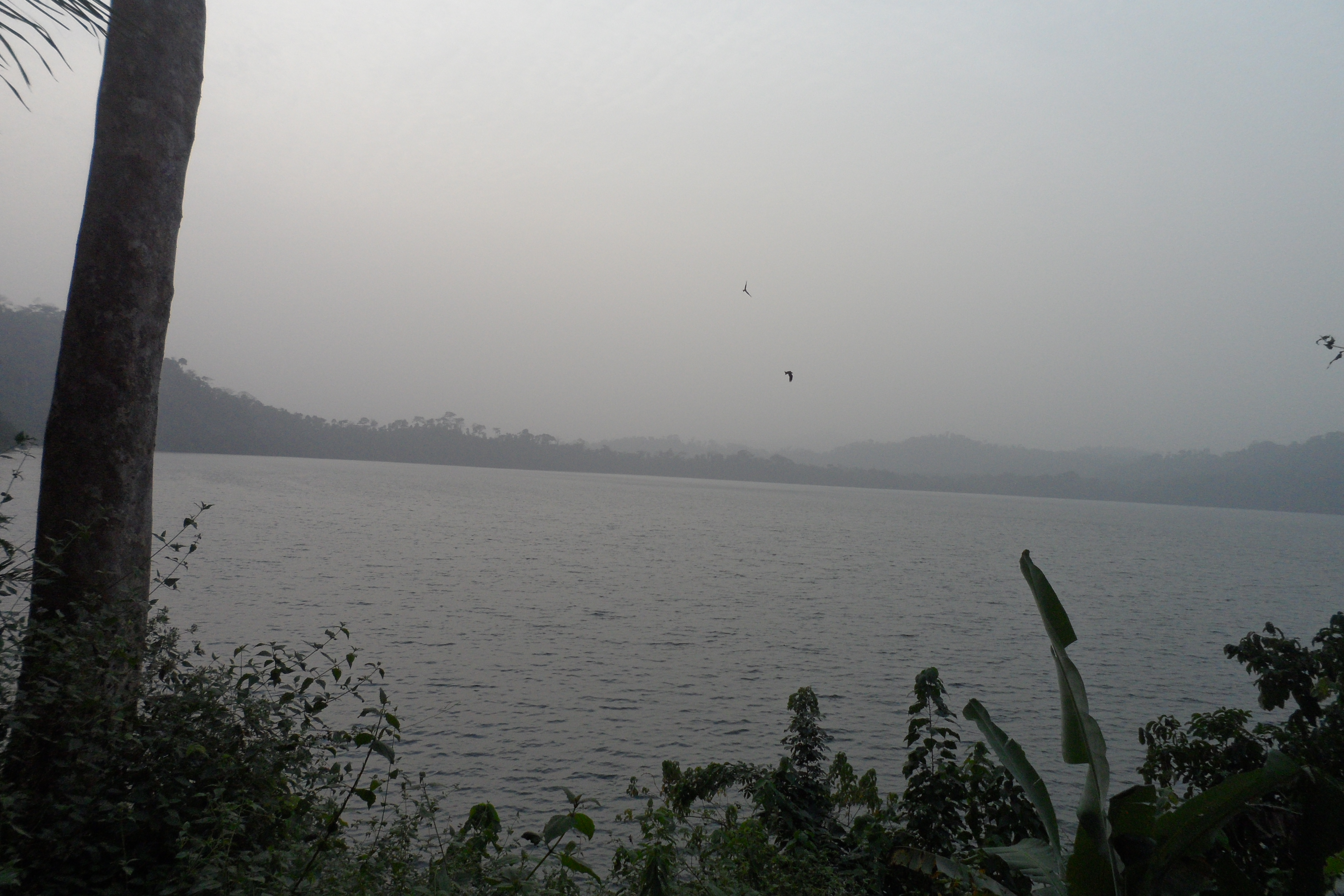
Crater Lake, Kumba

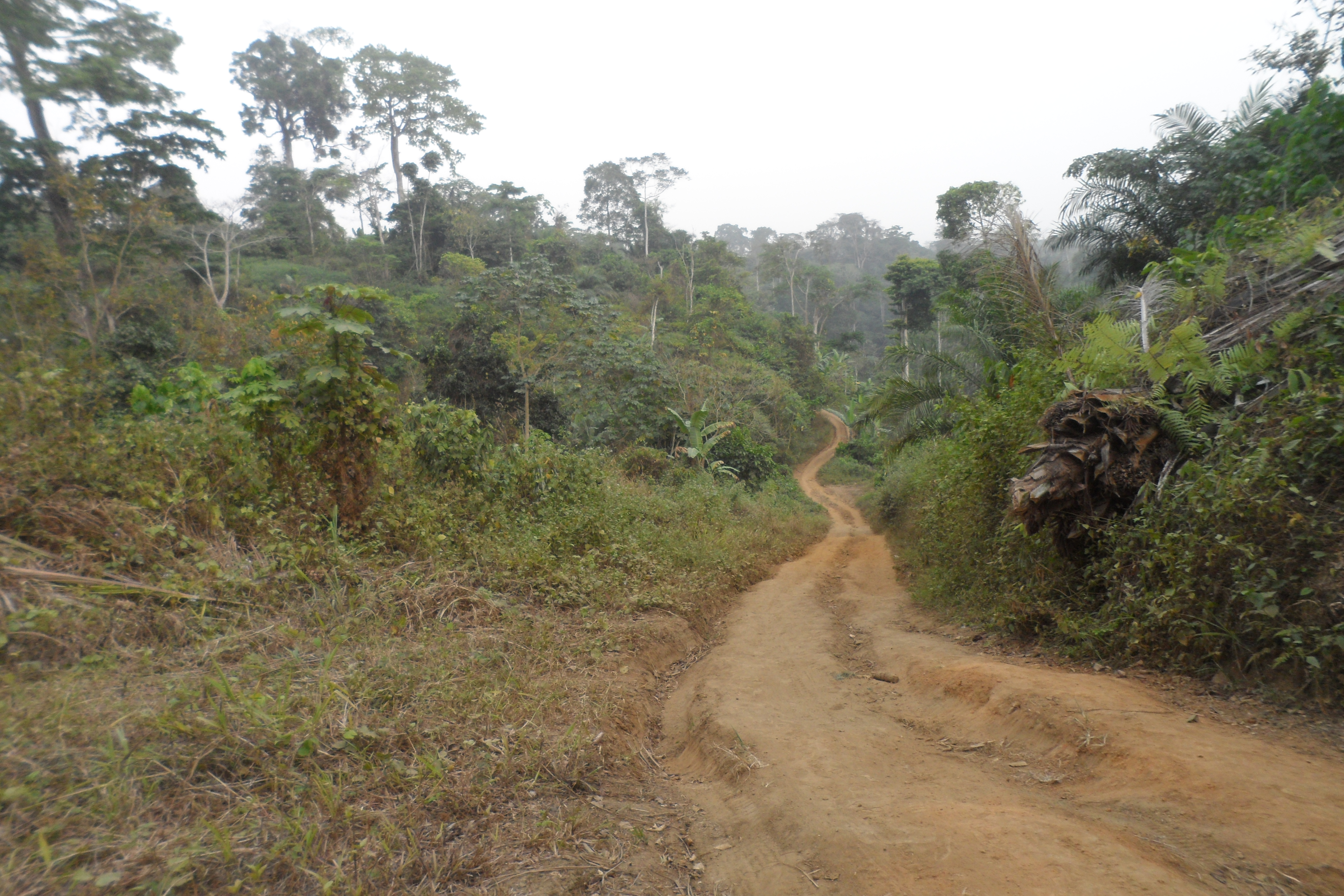
Forest Reserve, Lake Barombi

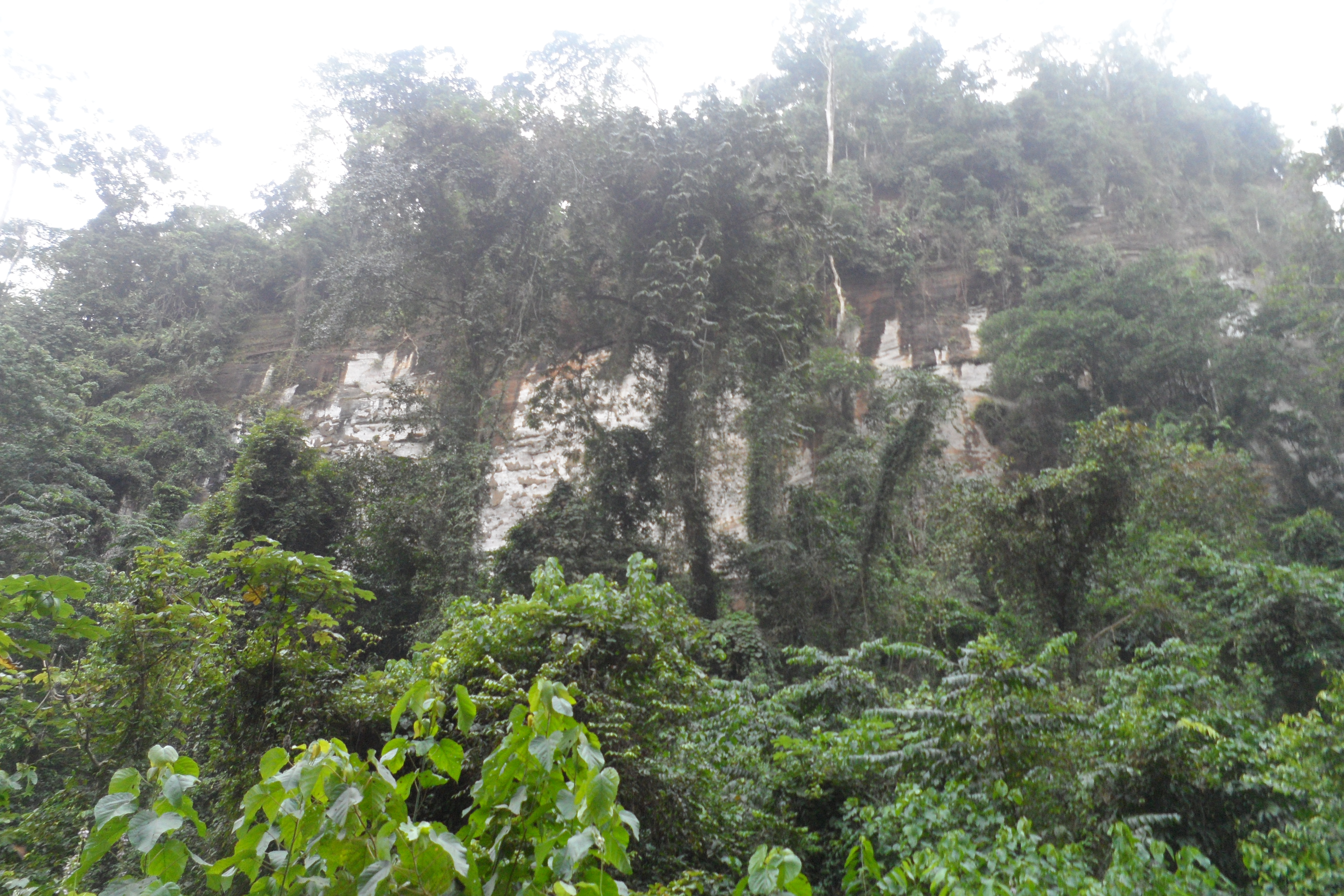
Bakundu Forest Reserve, Lake Barombi

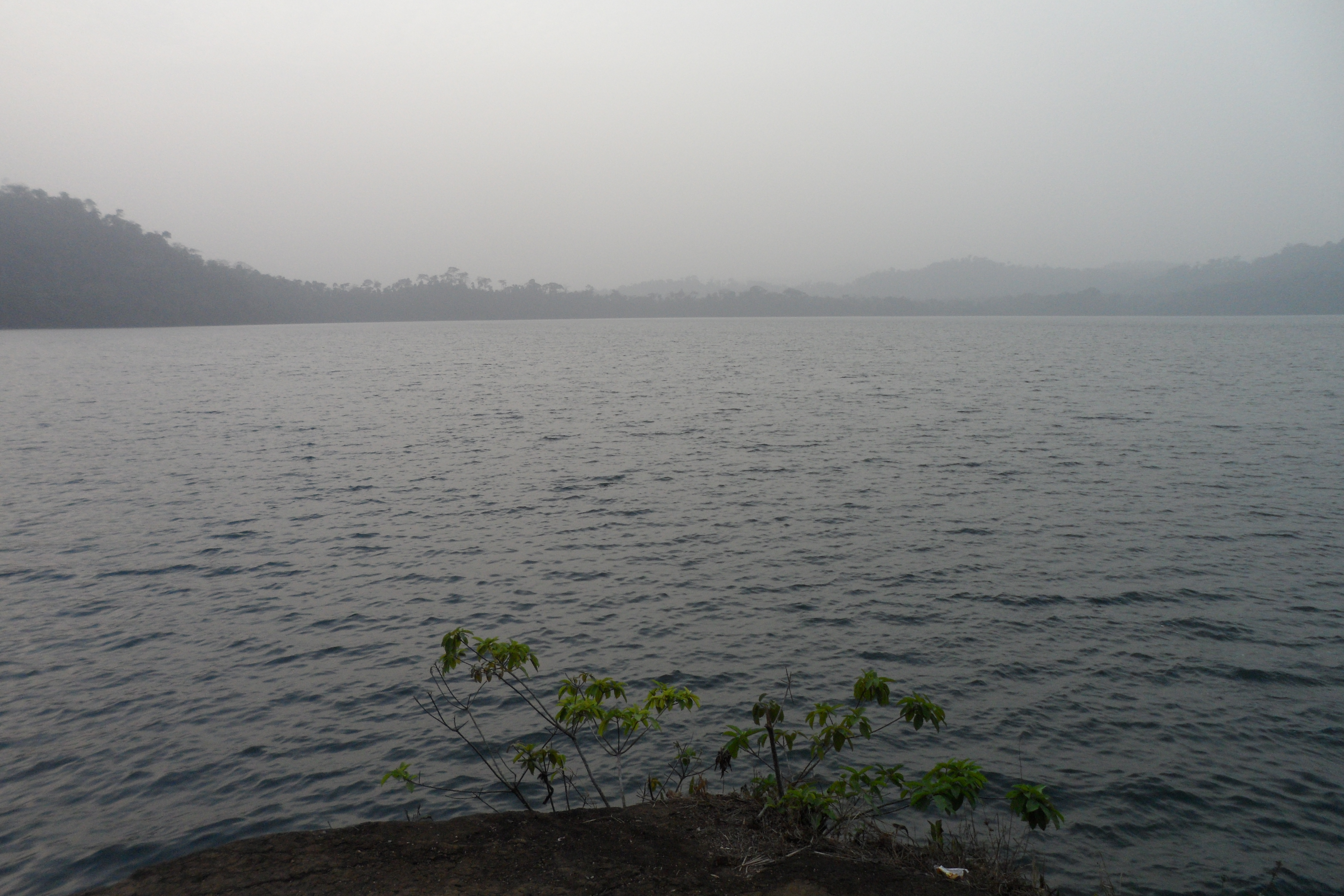
Lake Barombi

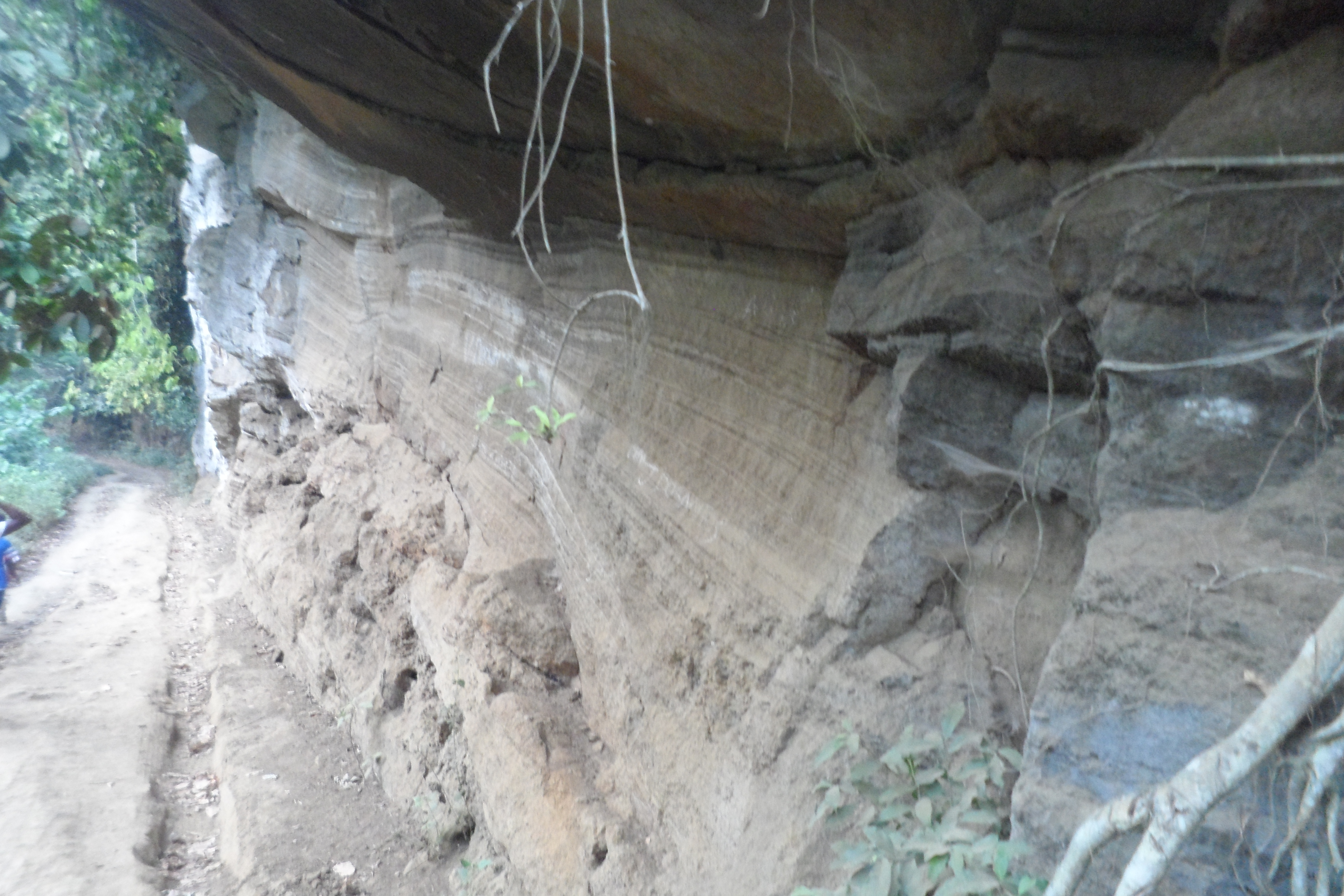
Pyroclastic deposit, Kumba

== Administration ==
Kumba is the capital of the Meme department of the Southwest Region. It has three sub-divisional councils: Kumba 1 (Kumba Town-Kake, a part of Buea Road), Kumba 2 (Kosala, Hausa-quarters and Fiango) and Kumba 3 (Three Corners, Mambanda and a part of Buea Road), each has a local mayor. The town is also run by a government appointed Senior Divisional Officer (SDO) and a government delegate.

== Transport ==
Kumba serves as a crucial transport hub in the Southwest Region of Cameroon, facilitating the movement of people and goods to and from various locations. Its strategic position at the intersection of several major roads makes it a key junction for both local and regional transportation.

=== Road network ===
The city is well-connected by an extensive road network, with major highways linking it to nearby towns and cities. Key routes include:

- Kumba-Mamfe Road: This road connects Kumba to Mamfe, leading towards the Nigerian border. It is vital for trade and travel between Cameroon and Nigeria.
- Kumba-Mundemba Road: This route leads to Mundemba and the Korup National Park, promoting tourism and access to natural resources.
- Kumba-Buea Road: This important road connects Kumba to Buea, the regional capital of the Southwest Region, facilitating commuter travel and commerce.

These roads are crucial for transporting agricultural products, particularly cocoa, palm oil, and rubber, which are significant to Kumba's economy.

=== Railway system ===
Kumba is served by a railway line that connects it to the national rail network, specifically linking it to the city of Douala, which is Cameroon's main commercial port. The railway facilitates the transport of goods and raw materials, particularly agricultural products, to larger markets and export routes. While passenger services exist, they are less frequent compared to road transport.

=== Public transport ===
Public transportation options in Kumba include shared taxis, buses, and motorbike taxis, commonly referred to as "okada." These modes of transport are widely used by residents for daily commuting and travel within and outside the city. The affordability and accessibility of these services make them popular choices among the local population.

=== Challenges ===
While Kumba's transport infrastructure is essential for its economy, it faces challenges such as road maintenance issues and safety concerns. The ongoing Anglophone Crisis has also impacted transportation services, leading to disruptions and reduced travel options at times.

=== Future developments ===
Efforts are underway to improve Kumba's transport infrastructure, including road upgrades and potential expansions to public transport services and the railway system. These developments aim to enhance connectivity and support the city's growth as a commercial center in the region.

Overall, Kumba's transport system plays a vital role in connecting the city to neighboring regions and supporting its economic activities.

== People and culture ==
Languages

The majority of the Kumba people speak English, Pidgin and to a lesser extent, French, and a sizeable amount of indigenous languages, most presently the Bafaw, Bakundu, Bakossi and Mbonge.

The ethnic groups of Kumba are the Bafaw and the Bakundus. Bafaw is an ethnic group who speak Lifaw, a language similar to Duala, and the Bakundu ethnic group who speak the Bakundu language (Orocko language), Mboh, Bakundu Language and Bakossi, and certainly Southern Bantoid. Due to the city's cosmopolitan nature, the Bafaw and the Bakundu now form just a percentage of the general population of the city, and have lost many aspects of their culture, except for their language which is spoken mostly by the elderly and some of the younger generation.

== See also ==
- Railway stations in Cameroon
