= Mmuock Leteh =

Mmuock Leteh Fotang
- Commune and village
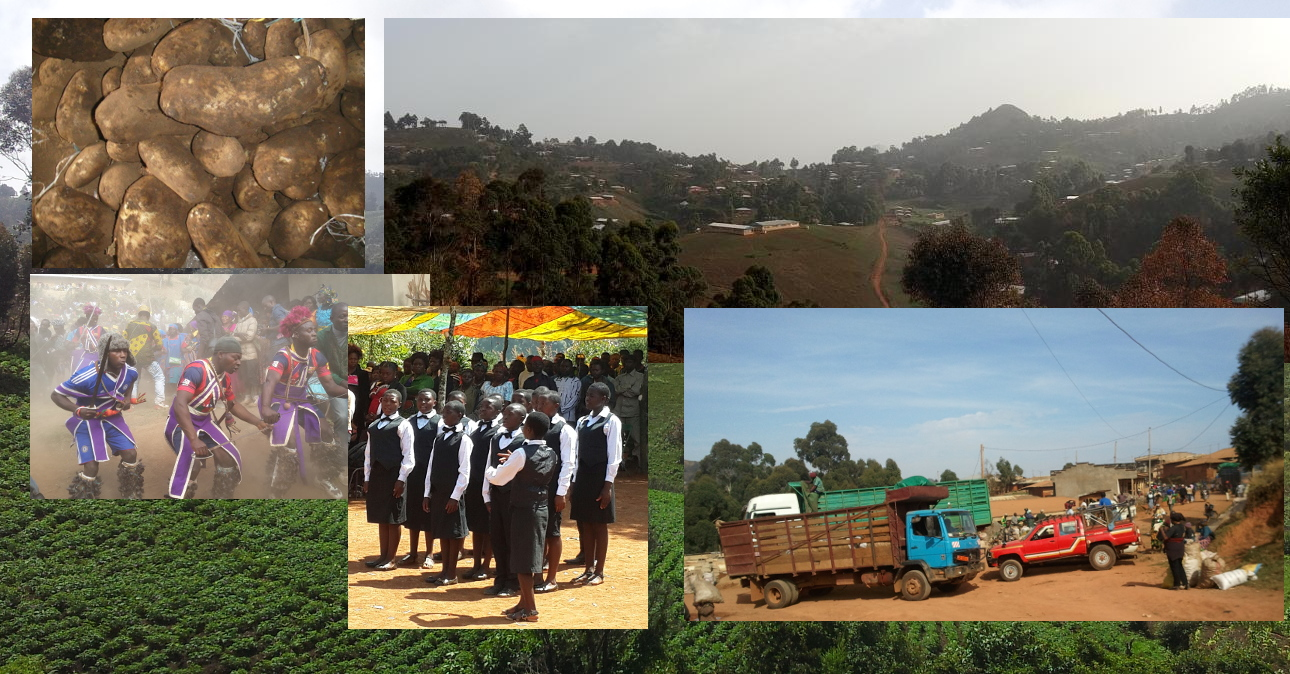
- From top (L-R): main market crop potato, Mandzong group performs, students of the St John Paul II college sing the national anthem, early morning traders at the local market, partial panoramic view of Ntemndzem
- Etymology: lètǽʼlé (Yemba pronunciation: [lətɛʔlə]) (not quite agreed upon)
- Nicknames: Leteh, Fotang, Bamock Fotang, Mmuock Fotang, Nko'olaq
- Location within Cameroon
- Coordinates: 5.675°N 10.041°E
- Country: Cameroon
- Division: Lebialem
- Region: Southwest
- Ethnic group: Bamilike
- Founded: ca 1760
- Founder: Nkemtang
- Divisions: Quarters: Maleta; Ntemndzem I; Kongo (Yemba pronunciation: [kɔŋɔ]); Mbamuock; Mvè; Belang; Pagapuh (Yemba pronunciation: [paɣapuʔ]); Ndungkiet & Bekwop; Besang; Ndeqmngong; Ntemndzem II; Ntemndzem III; Ntemndzem IV; Aghong
- Elevation: 2,496 m (8,189 ft)
- Highest elevation: 2,740 m (8,990 ft)
- Demonym(s): Ŋeqleteh ([ŋeɣletɛʔ]), Mbaleteh (pl.)
- Time zone: UTC+1 (WAT)

Mmuock Leteh (Yemba pronunciation: [m̩muɔk lətɛʔ]) is a community of the Mmuock tribe. Administratively, it is found in the Wabane subdivision of the Lebialem Division in the Southwest Region of Cameroon. Located at 5.675°N/10.041°E, it is the last village on the northwestern border with the West Region of the country. Colonial administrators called it Fotang after the name of the traditional ruler. As a result, the village is today alternatively known as Fotang, and that name is retained on some administrative maps of Cameroon and on satellite imagery.

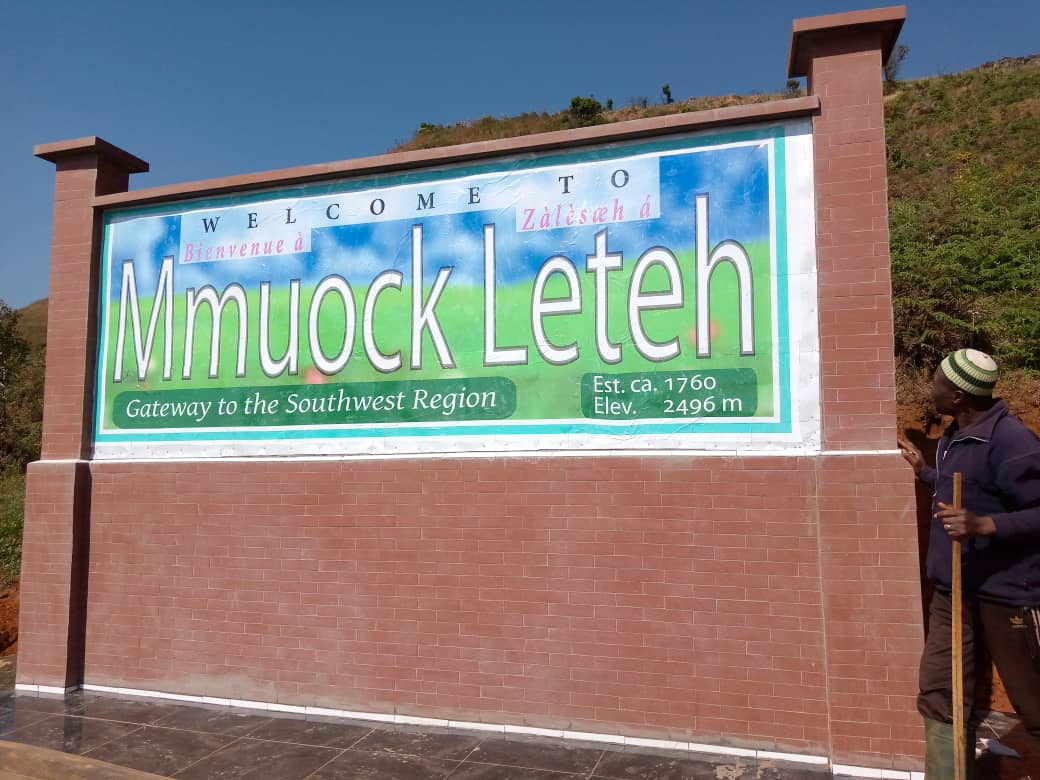
Mmuock Leteh Welcome Sign

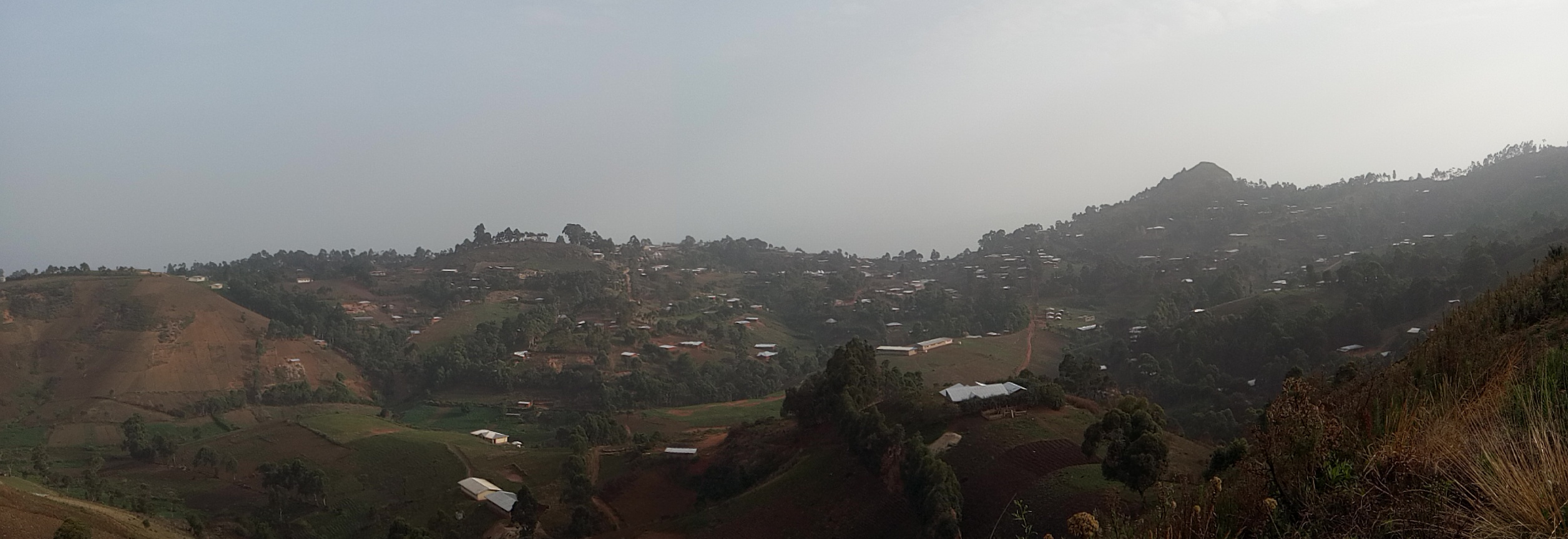
Partial view of Ntemndzem, Mmuock Leteh, Southwest Region, Cameroon

At 2740 m asl, Mmuock Leteh has one of the highest peaks in Cameroon located in Maleta. The climate can be termed temperate, with night temperatures occasionally falling below 10 °C and the lower regions characterised by fog during the day.

== History ==
Mmuock Leteh is part of the Mmuock tribe and, hence, shares the same early history with the other Mmuock villages.

=== Evolution from the Mmuock group ===
Not much is known about the Mmuock people prior to the 18th century. According to oral history, they at one point settled at a place called Bezeq Føka (Yemba pronunciation: [bəzəɣ fɯka]) in the present-day Menoua division of the Western Region. Thence, they migrated to a locality which today lies in Bafou and is called Fem Mmuock (meaning ruins of the abandoned location of Mmuock) by Mmuock people, and "Femock" by Bafou people . Eventually, the people split into two groups of two factions each, and each group went off in a different direction. One group included followers of a man called Nkemtang. They moved northwards and settled at a place today called Fem Leteh (Yemba pronunciation: [ʔə.fəm lətɛʔ]), meaning ruins of the abandoned location of Leteh. There, they founded the village of Mmuock-Leteh. Nkemtang, who was the group's leader, was renamed Fotang (Yemba pronunciation: [fɯtaŋ]) and became the village ruler. (In the Mmuock language, the prefix Nkem (Yemba pronunciation: [ŋkəəm]) denotes a notable of high rank; Fø (Yemba pronunciation: [ʔə.fɯ]), on the other hand, is the highest rank and signifies a ruler.) As the Nkemtang faction had been the largest, Leteh was known amongst the other Mmuock communities as Nko'olaq (Yemba pronunciation: [ŋkɔʔɔlaɣ]) (meaning the larger section).

From the then Fem Leteh, Leteh people migrated into the hinterlands and settled at Mbammuock (the residence of Mmuock), also known as Ndzem-Nko'olaq (the rear of Nko'olaq). In the late 70s and early 80s, Leteh people starting migrating from the forest region around Mbammuock, to the grassland areas up in the hills at about 2400 m above sea level. This resulted from the need to cultivate market garden crops such as potato, garlic and carrots.

=== Etymology ===
The name Leteh comes from the Mmuock verb lètǽ'lé (Yemba pronunciation: [lətɛʔlə]) meaning: to be not quite agreed upon, to be not quite set. They were so-named because Nkemtang's faction never could agree on any strategy before setting out, and tended to improvise as they went along.

== Geography ==
The relief of Mmuock Leteh is irregular. The village lies on the summit of the Bamboutous Mountain ranges: The Maleta Plateau is at 2740 m above sea level, and is the third highest point on the Western Cameroon Highlands. The relief is very accidented in some places characterised by mountain peaks—each of which is called Ntǿ (Yemba pronunciation: [ntɯ]) in the Mmuock language—, steep rolling and pyramidal hills separated by very incised river valleys and ravines.

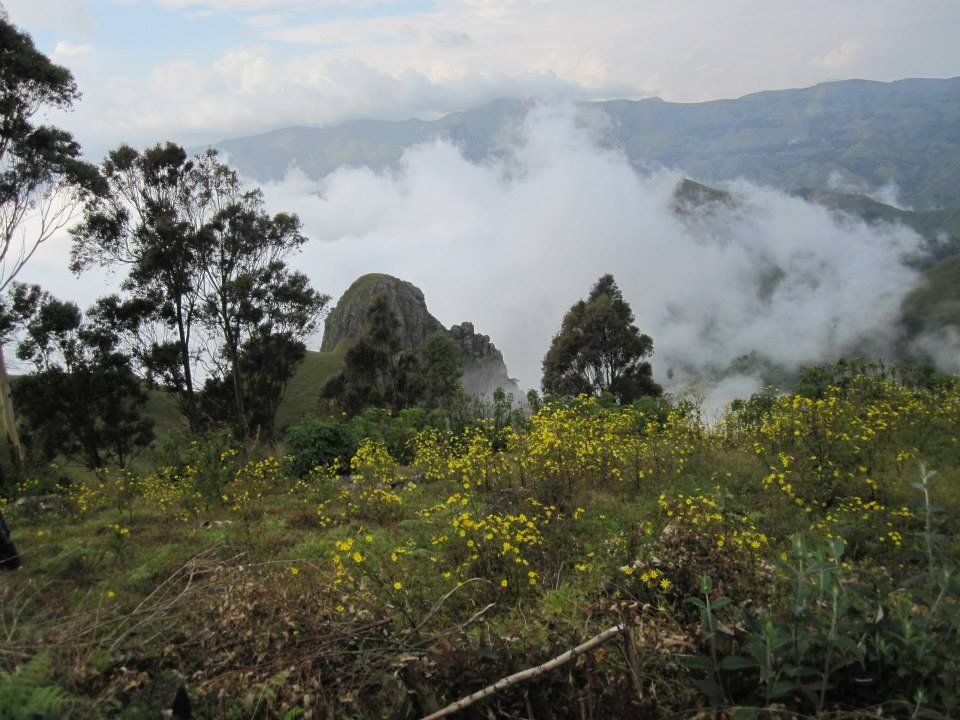
Ntø Tiahchia as seen from Bekwop

Mmuock Leteh occupies part of the western half of the semi-circular caldera that attracts several tourists annually. The village is further defined by a concentric alignment of necks and domes known locally as Mntǿ (Yemba pronunciation: [mntɯ]) or peaks. Examples of such peaks include Ntø Maleta (2740 m), Ntø Mangua (2710 m), Ntø Tiahchia, etc.

Mmuock Leteh has a tropical mountainous climate of the sub-equatorial type. The accidented nature of the relief has greatly influenced this climate which is characterised by a long rainy season (mid-March to mid-November) and a shorter dry season (mid-November to mid-March). The monthly rainfall ranges between 35 mm in January and 605 mm in August, August being the wettest month. The temperature varies between 8 and 28 °C: In altitudes above 1800 m asl, night temperatures fall as low as 8 °C during the rainy season.

The soils are volcanic, fertile and rich for agricultural production. (This has led to Mmuock Leteh farmers winning prizes at the national agro-pastoral shows in Cameroon: in potatoes, carrots and other vegetables). The soil consists of a vegetal material at the summit (35 cm), followed by a humified horizon of 35 to 40 cm, a tertiary horizon and a clayey horizon. These soils have been largely altered and impoverished by erosion and landslides, leading to the loss of much of its organic materials. The 2003 landslides led to destruction of crops, livestock and infrastructure.

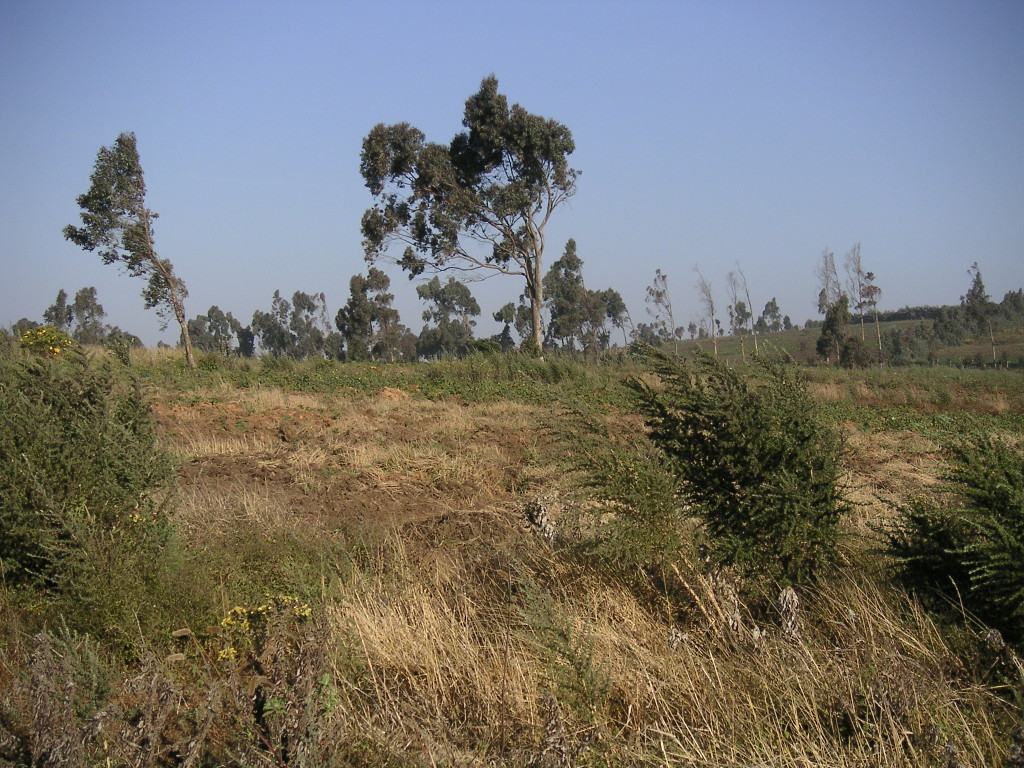
Vegetation on the flat Maleta Plateau at 2740 m asl. Grass and trees are permanently tilted to one side.

The village is covered by a herbaceous Savannah grassland dominated by plants (Poacées and Cyperacées), eucalyptus saligna trees and gallery forest in the lowland areas. Some of the grass species found here, include Cloris sp, Cypérus haspan, Paspalum polystachion, and Axonopus compressus. The forest areas are covered by trees such as pronus africana, raffia palm, and kolanut trees. Until the early sixties, the lower forest zone harboured several birds and animal species. These included monkeys, chimpanzees, porcupines, squirrels, deer, etc. Extensive poaching has, however, led to the eradication of these animals.

== Culture ==
Mmuock people generally have the same culture. Being of the Bamilike ethnic group, they have a very similar culture to the bordering communities of Bangang, Bafou and Fongo-Tongo, all in the West Region of Cameroon.

=== Culture Festival ===
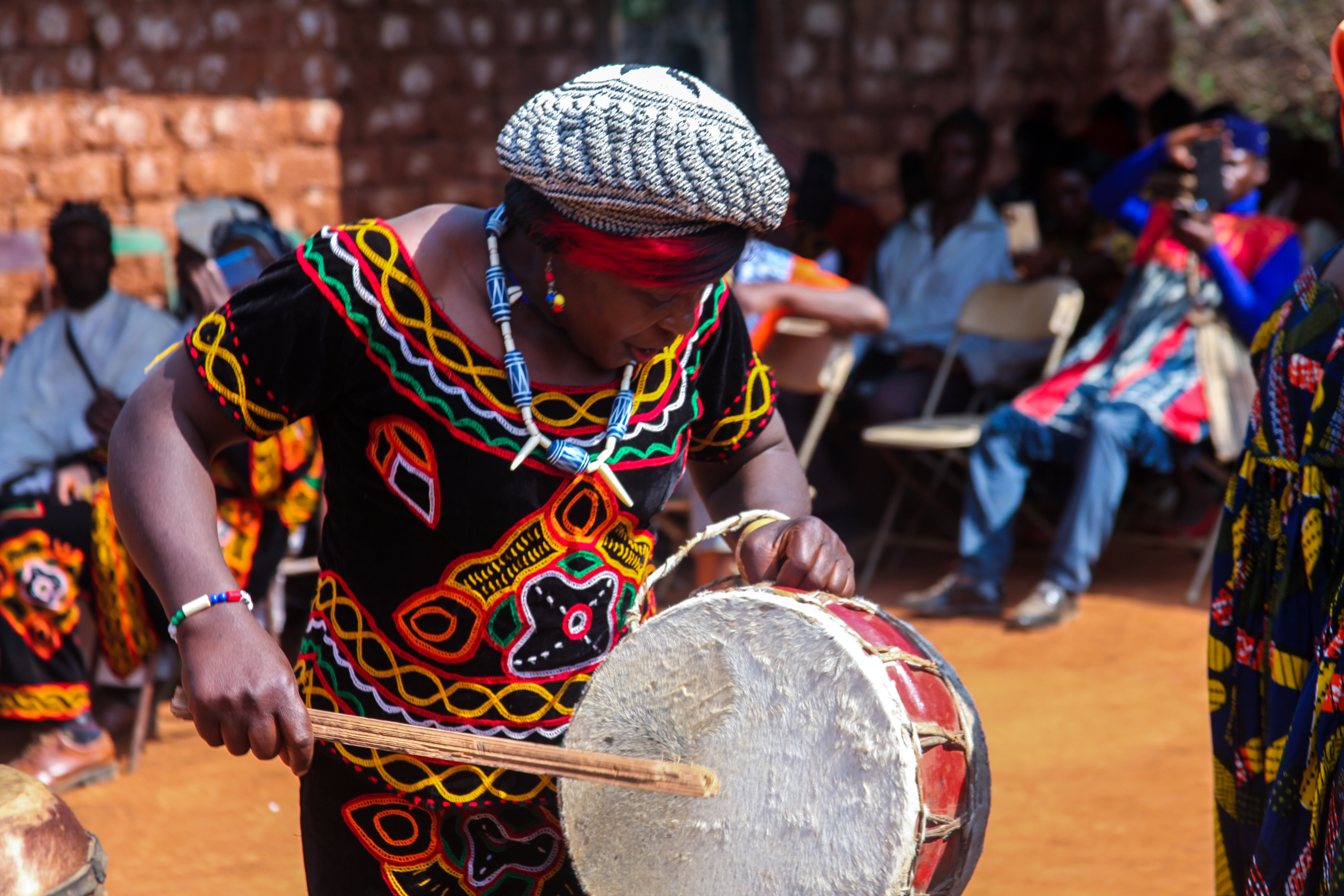
A female drummer at the Leteh Culture Festival

The Leteh Culture Festival is an annual event to showcase the culture and traditions of Mmuock Leteh.

=== Religious beliefs ===
Although Christianity has been adopted in recent times, Mmuock Leteh people still adhere to beliefs and practices of traditional religion. At the founding of the village, several shrines were created and dedicated to each of the primary gods of the village. Prominent families typically have a shrine dedicated to the gods of the family; such shrines are usually located at the entrance into the family compound.

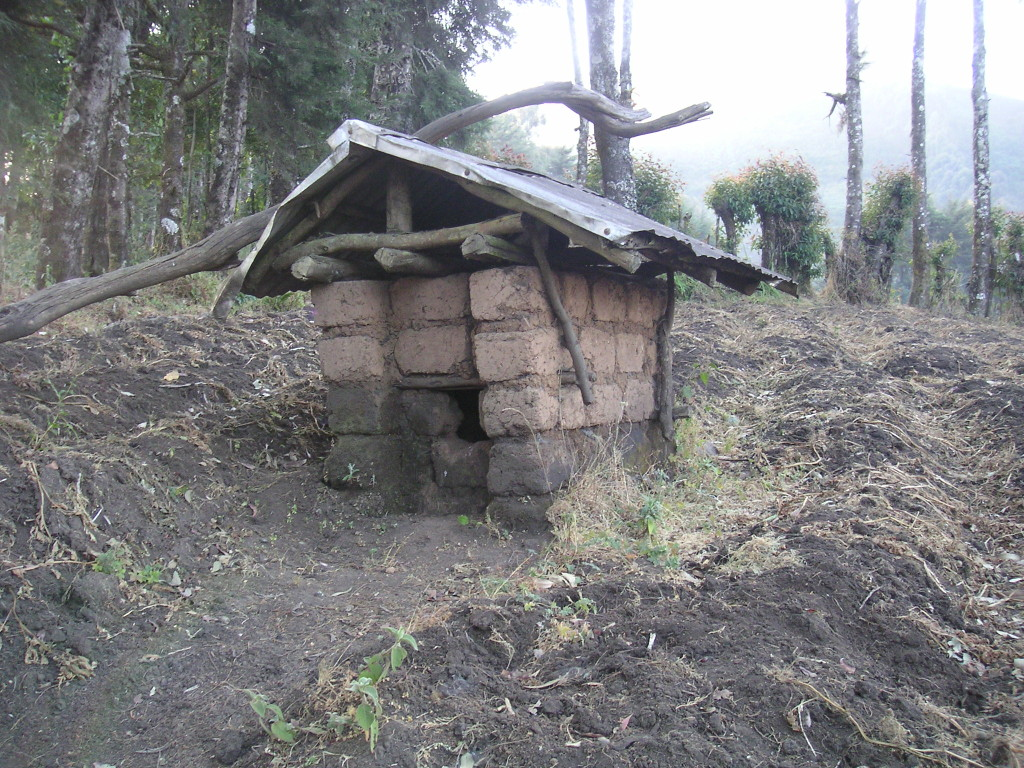
A family shrine in Mmuock-Leteh, Cameroon

The dominant Christian denomination is the Catholic church which displaced the Presbyterian church. Two reasons led to the prominence of the Catholic church. While the lone primary school in the village (P.S. Fotang) was taken over by the government, Catholic School Leteh was created. Secondly, the Presbyterian Church did not have a committed presence in the village. The establishment of St Anthony's Catholic Church and regular visits from priests, caused more and more people to attend the catholic mass. The Divine Mercy Parish was created in 2013, originally as a quasi-parish.

=== Cuisine ===
The traditional food of Leteh is aPáláh (Yemba pronunciation: [apalaʔ]). It is prepared by pounding taro in a mortar using a pestle, and is served on cocoyam leaves and eaten with the finger. It is served with either yellow soup or with black soup. In the Western part of Cameroon, a very similar meal is called achu. The difference between achu and aPáláh is that the latter is made purely from colocasia, while achu sometimes includes bananas and varieties of cocoyam.

Due to a decline in the production of cocoyams, Ṗáláh has decreased in popularity and been supplanted by meals based on Irish potato. As today's most familiar crop in Mmuock Leteh, the potato forms the basis of the most popular meals.

==== Preparation of traditional meal ====
aPáláh is made from taro (Colocasia esculenta). Two people are usually involved in the mashing or pounding process: one peels and the other one pounds. Traditionally, the taro does not require any ingredient, although today special bananas may be added. The resulting paste is wrapped in fresh taro leaves and served with yellow soup.

The yellow soup is made by stirring palm oil in warm water including potash limestone (Kàgnùà). Ingredients may include common salt, pepper, white peeper, and all variety meat and fish. Apart from yellow soup, black soup is also used. It is made from boiled taro leaves with the same ingredients as the yellow soup.

==== Common meals ====
- Mankœäh ncuúūh. The name of the meal comes from Mankœäh (Irish potato) and ncuúūh (the past participle of lècúh, to pound).This meal is mashed Irish potato mixed with beans (more often black beans). The beans areboiled in advance since they take a longer time to be done. The potatoes are boiled separately and the beans added 5 to 10 minutes before mashing begins. The mixture is mashed in a pot using a pestle. The beans tend to remain intact at the end of the process. Ingredients are palm oil, kitchen salt, and pepper.
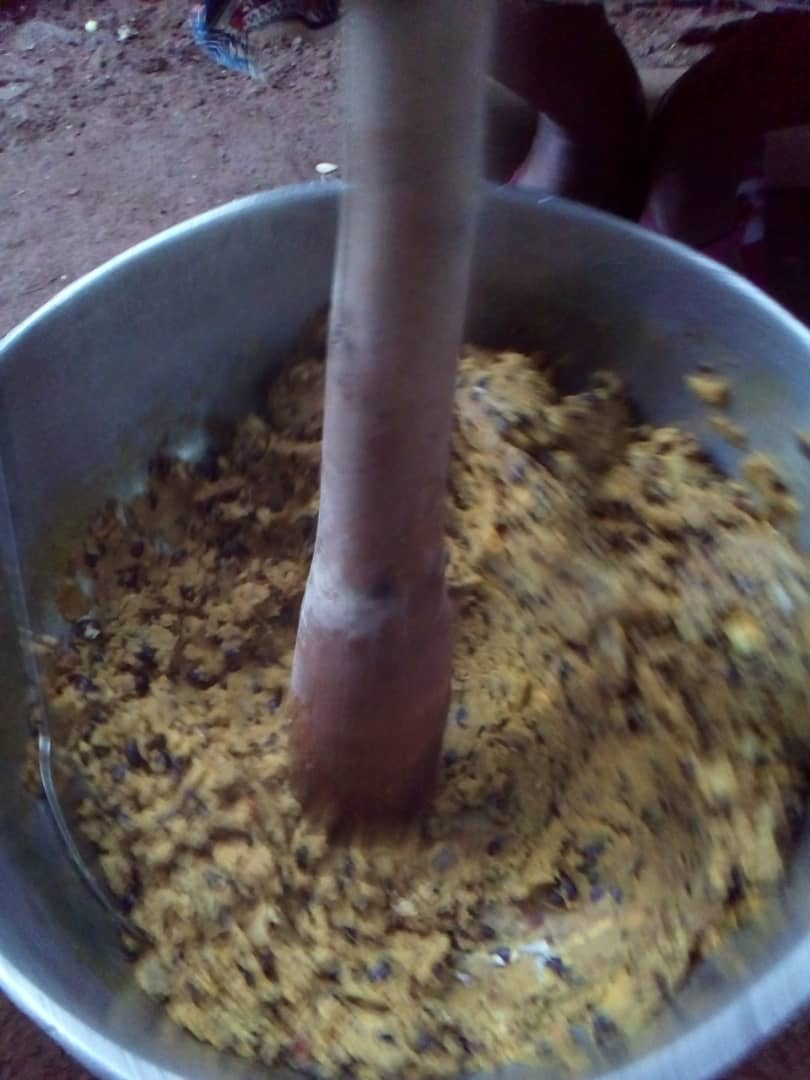
  Mankœäh ncuúūh, a meal of mashed potato and beans
- Mankœäh šiíīt (potato porridge). The name derives from šiíīt, the past participle of lèšīt (to stir). Mankœäh šiíīt is potato porridge. It is prepared by peeling Irish potatoes and boiling them together with freely-chosen ingredients such as vegetables, assorted spices, and meat.
- Mankœäh mahteéngwàng The name comes from lèmahtē (to sprinkle) and Ngwàng (salt). These are cooked Irish potatoes that have been boiled with salt to taste, and eaten with vegetables (such as cabbages) or stews.
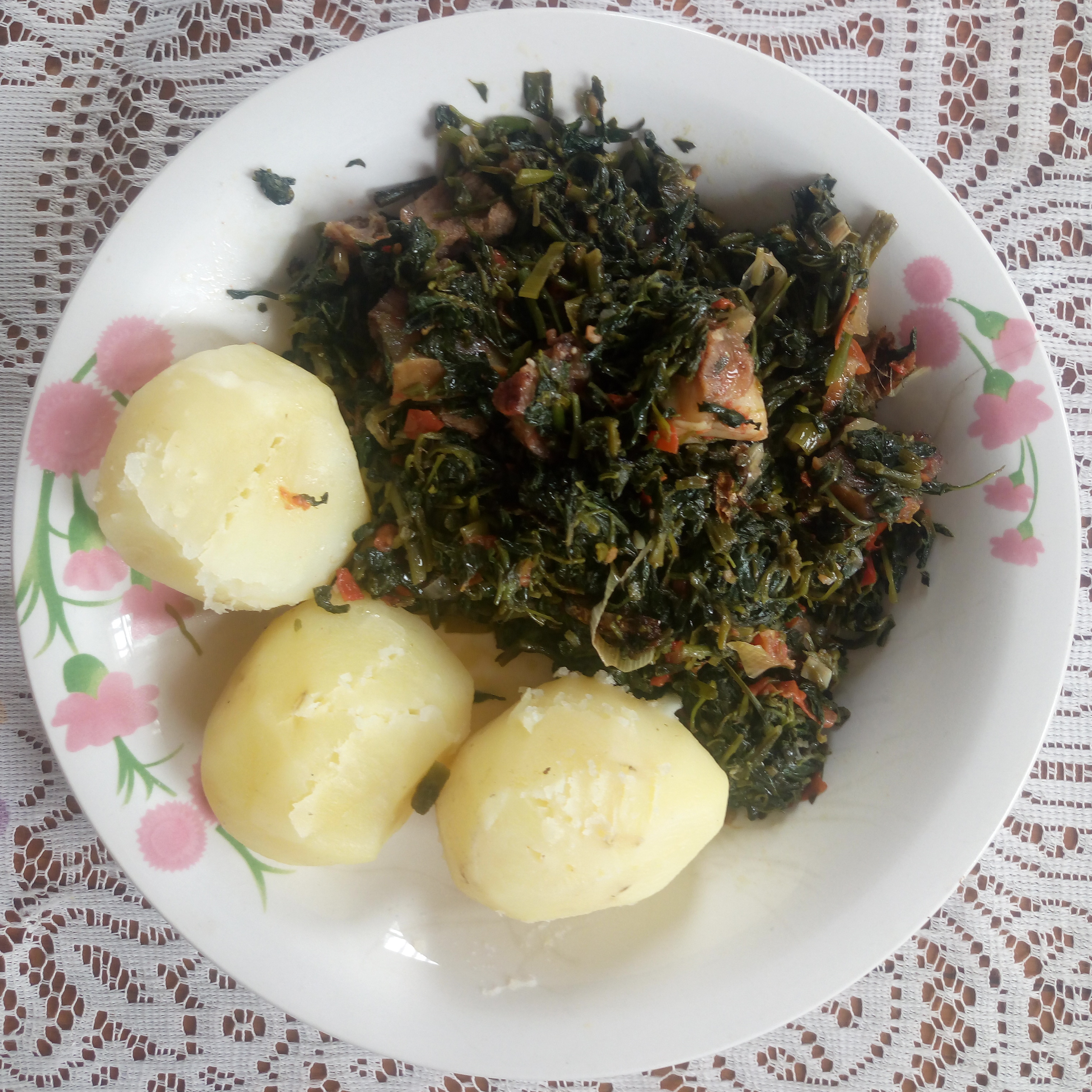
  Mankœäh mahteéngwàng
- Bekéqńgesàng . This is called corn-chaff in the local pidgin English. It is beans and corn cooked together. The skin is optionally peeled off the corn eyes. The corn is cooked first and beans added later. Ingredients depend on individual choice, but the most common are: palm or vegetable oil, kitchen salt, grinned ginger, garlic, pepper, white pepper, onion; cow skin, magi, and meat or fish.
- Besanggnà. It is a thick paste-like meal made from corn flour. The cornflour is filtered through a special sieve, separating the fine particles from chaff. The chaff is further washed to remove the corn skin. What remains is stirred in boiled water for a while, then the sieved powder is mixed to it. The entire meal is stirred until it gets ready. It is wrapped with fresh banana leaves and also eaten with hands.

=== Marriage ===
Polygamy, specifically polygyny, is the norm in Mmuock Leteh.

Prior to the mid-sixties, the procedure for gaining a wife was simple and unsophisticated. For example, if a man touched the belly of a pregnant woman and she subsequently birthed a girl, the girl was indisputably his future wife. A girl's future husband could also be the first man who placed a shilling in her right hand upon her birth. It could also be the first man who brought a log of firewood to girl's family compound upon her birth and split the log himself as a show of strength and fitness. In all of these situations, the man could also be reserving the female child for his son. Due to exposure to other cultures, especially Western culture, the process of marriage started seeing changes in the seventies.

==== The Marriage Proposal ====
As a male child attains the age of marriage, it is expected that he get married. The choice of potential wife is made either by the young man, who then seeks his father's approval, or by his parents, who have to convince him of their choice. Once a consensus is reached with the parents, the father begins the process of asking for the girl's hand in marriage. It is understood that the girl is being married to the family, represented by the father, and not directly to the suitor.

The suitor's father advances a marriage proposal to the girl's family by visiting the girl's family compound bearing palm wine and kola nuts. As the visit progresses, the matter of marriage is spoken of only in parables; the names of the girl and the boy are not mentioned directly. Should the girl's father be open to considering the proposal, he will at least allow some of the palm wine and the kola nut to be consumed. Upon his departure, if the response is not an outright no, the suitor's father is asked to expect a response at a later date.

==== The Response ====
Before the sixties, the girl had no say in the choice of husband; the father simply informed her. In recent times, the father, finding no objection to the marriage proposal, asks the girl if she is willing to marry the suitor. If she answers in the affirmative, the father informs the suitor's father of a positive decision, and both agree on a date for official introductions. The introductory ceremony is private and strictly for close members of the two families, although each family may invite a few friends.

At the introductory ceremony, members of the suitor's family offer gifts to members of the girl's family and invitees of the girl's family. There is usually some haggling involved, as some people may be dissatisfied with that they are being offered. Originally, the gifts consisted mainly of salt and were meant to ease the pain of losing a capable hand in the household. Hence, the name of the name of occasion: Ngwángmū́ (Yemba pronunciation: [ŋgwaŋ.mu]), literally meaning “salt for the child”, in the Mmuock language. Since the seventies, salt has been largely replaced with money, with the understanding that the recipient will buy the salt themselves. The bride price (the amount for the girl's father) is also agreed upon. At the end of the occasion, the girl is considered betrothed; the suitor's family starts referring to her as "our wife" and may start providing for some of her needs, such as clothing.

==== The Bride Price ====
The bride price, which goes to the bride's father, is negotiated at the introductory ceremony by selected elders from both families. Negotiation is through a bidding process. Broomsticks are used, each broomstick representing a certain amount of money (or whatever counts as money at the time, for example, cowries). Once both sides come to an agreement, an announcement is made to those assembled. The bride price may subsequently be paid in installments. For the first installment, the girl's father asks the suitor's father to lend him something, and states the amount. This exercise is called Leføpaámù (Yemba pronunciation: [lə.fɯ.paamu]), literally meaning "borrowing the child's purse". As long as the bride price has not been fully paid, the suitor (or his father) is said to be keeping the in-law's "purse". Whenever the girl's father requires a payment, he asks groom's family to kindly give him something out of his purse.

The four grandparents are treated specially. They receive items and money, the amounts of which are generally known and are non-negotiable. The bride's mother customarily does not accept anything until her (the mother's) parents have been consulted.

==== The Wedding Ceremony ====
A few days after the introductory event, the bride is escorted in the evening by three elderly women to the groom's family. On arrival, elderly women rub her with palm oil and camwood powder. The evening is one of folktales, singing, and dancing, with no restriction on who can attend. This is the wedding ceremony. Amongst the many games and dances is a mandatory dance called Mbuelè (Yemba pronunciation: [mbu.lə])(wedding dance) which is performed under the moonlight. Parallel to traditional folk dances, modern music is played under supervision of a chief celebrant called Talêlǔng (Yemba pronunciation: [ta.lə.luŋ]) The celebration continues every evening for one week, at the end of which the Talêlǔng declares that the wedding ceremony is over. The bride and the groom are now married.

==== Divorce ====
Divorce is initiated by certain explicit actions of either the man or the woman. The man initiates the divorce when he sends the wife away and informs his in-laws that he has ended the marriage. A woman declares the divorce when she leaves the marital home and either (a) returns to her parents and the parents allow her to live with them, or (b) her parents living far away, moves in with a family of close relatives and they allow her to live with them. Once it is ascertained by the woman's family that the marriage is over, the next step, called check, must be done in order to conclude the end of the marriage. In this step, members of both families, in similar composition to those of the introductory ceremony, meet at a neutral venue, usually the palace or the quarter-head's compound. Also present is a scribe. Each family enumerates the expenditures that it has made, as a consequence of the marriage, to the benefit of the opposite family. Expenditures include the bride price and any presents made to the members of the opposite family during the duration of the marriage. Expenditures that the recipients acknowledge, are written down. Where there is disagreement, a compromise must be sought. For example, there could be a dispute as to whether a purported fowl that was gifted, was a cock or a hen, a cock being more expensive than a hen.

At the end of the exercise, the total expenditures are added up and compared. Should they not match, the family with the lower amount must pay the balance to the other family. As long as the husband's family has not yet received any of a balance due them, the woman still belongs to his family, although not as a wife. This has the following consequences:

- If another man desires to marry the woman, her family plays no role. Only the current husband can give her away in marriage.
- If the woman births any further children, they will bear the name of the current husband.
- If the woman dies, her remains will be brought to the man.

However, if the husband's family has received part payment of a balance, then the remainder is just a debt to be paid.

This step (the check) may be waived by the husband's family, thereby absolving the woman's family of any financial obligations towards the family.

=== Befák ===
Befák is the most sacred female-led ceremony in Mmuock Leteh. It is reserved for women ― each called Mañiē (Yemba pronunciation: [maɲiə]) or "mother of twins" ― who have given birth to more than one child at a time (twins, triplets, etc.). However, it may admit women from two other groups: women who have attained a certain advanced age; and women who have been declared mothers of twins by a soothsayer.

=== Rituals for the dead ===
When a person dies, one or more funeral rites may be performed. The kind and number of rites depend on the deceased's age, rank, and gender.

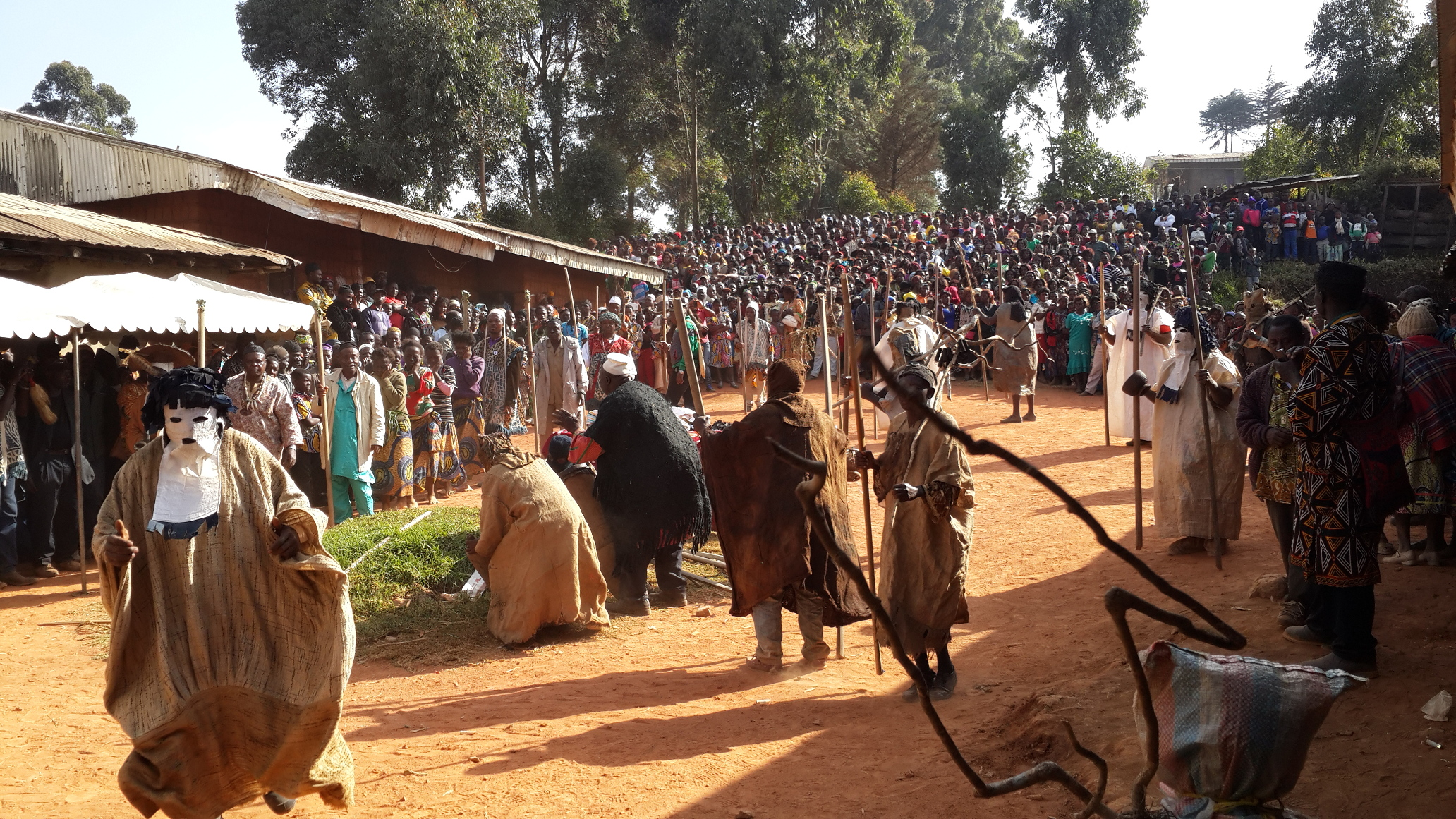
One of the rites performed during a funeral ceremony in Mmuock Leteh

=== Succession and kinship ===
Inheritance and succession passes through the male line. A man is expected to choose a successor (Njœêndíǽ) before dying. After death, his titles and possessions go by default to the male heir, unless the deceased had made a will or specifically assigned certain possessions to other relatives, for example, which child gets what. In the early days, the will was verbal, told to an intimate friend. Nowadays, it is written and handed to at least two friends for fear of alteration. The first-born (Mbviemù) cannot succeed the father.

Wives, too, may have successors. However, a wife's successor does not always need to be expressly stated: it is by default her last child, irrespective of the child's gender; she could also have specified a grandchild. Grandparents also have successors irrespective of gender. These category of successors must not necessarily be designated by grandparents. They are designated even after their death, and there is no unique rule on chosen the successors; individual families do so based on individual choice and significance.

== Education ==
The first primary school in Leteh started in 1946 in Mbamuock. A Presbyterian school, it was at the entrance into the compound of Tatenkœang (Yemba pronunciation: [tatəŋkɨaŋ]), some 200m up from the palace. Mr Enderley, accompanied by his wife Paulina, was the teacher; the first pupils, Chiatiah (Peter) and Sobetamu (Daniel), were his servants. Many promising pupils were sent away to places as far away as Bali, and the school was moribund before another Presbyterian school, called PS Fotang, was opened higher up at Belang Quarter in 1959.

PS Fotang continued until about 1985 when, with the withdrawal of the Presbyterian church from many primary schools, government took control of the school and renamed it GS Fotang. In 1985, a Catholic School, CS Leteh, was created. Located at Ntemndzem, it is, in terms of population, the biggest catholic primary school in the Mamfe diocese. Two additional public primary schools have since been added; these are GS Maleta and GBPS Ntemndzem.

There are three secondary schools in the village, all located at Ntemndzem. They are GSS Mmuock Leteh, GTC Ntemndzem (a public technical college), and the John Paul II College (a catholic school).

== Agriculture ==
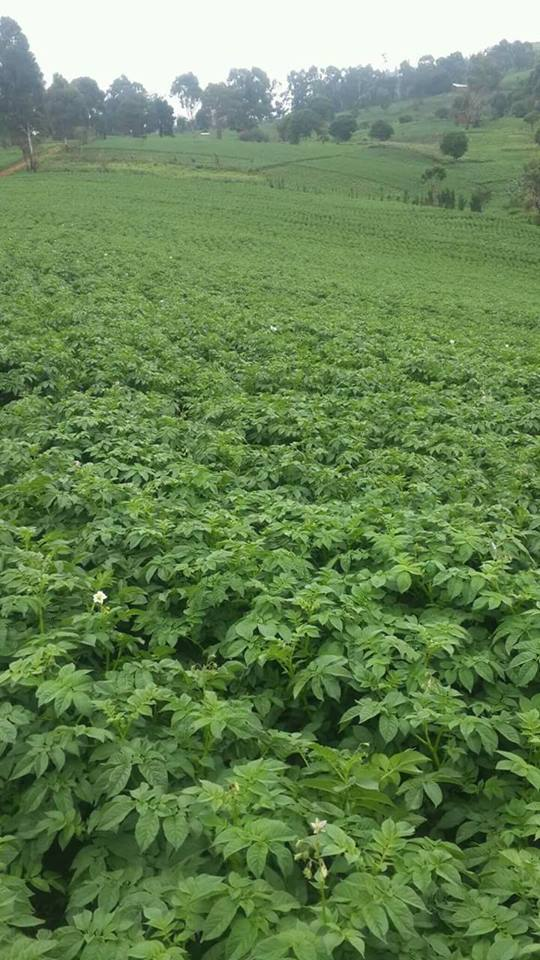
An Irish potato farm in Mmuock Leteh, Cameroon,

The population of Mmuock Leteh engage in agriculture and livestock breeding as their primary occupation. Although the main market crops are Irish potato and carrots, a diverse range of crops are produced, such as leek, cabbages, beetroot, garlic, maize, and beans.

== Health ==
Mmuock Leteh has an Integrated Health Centre and the Divine Mercy Health Post (a catholic health post) which, together, receive and attend to the healthcare needs of hundreds of patients annually. The Integrated Health Centre was opened in 1992 as a community development project. It was managed by the Health Commission of the Mmuock Leteh Cultural and Development Association (MULCUDA) until early 2009 when it became integrated and management was handed over to the government under the Fotang Health Area, Wabane Health District. The Catholic health post was started in 2016 as an extension of the Catholic Health Initiative under the Mamfe Diocese. In 2023, it was replaced by the Catholic Health Centre.

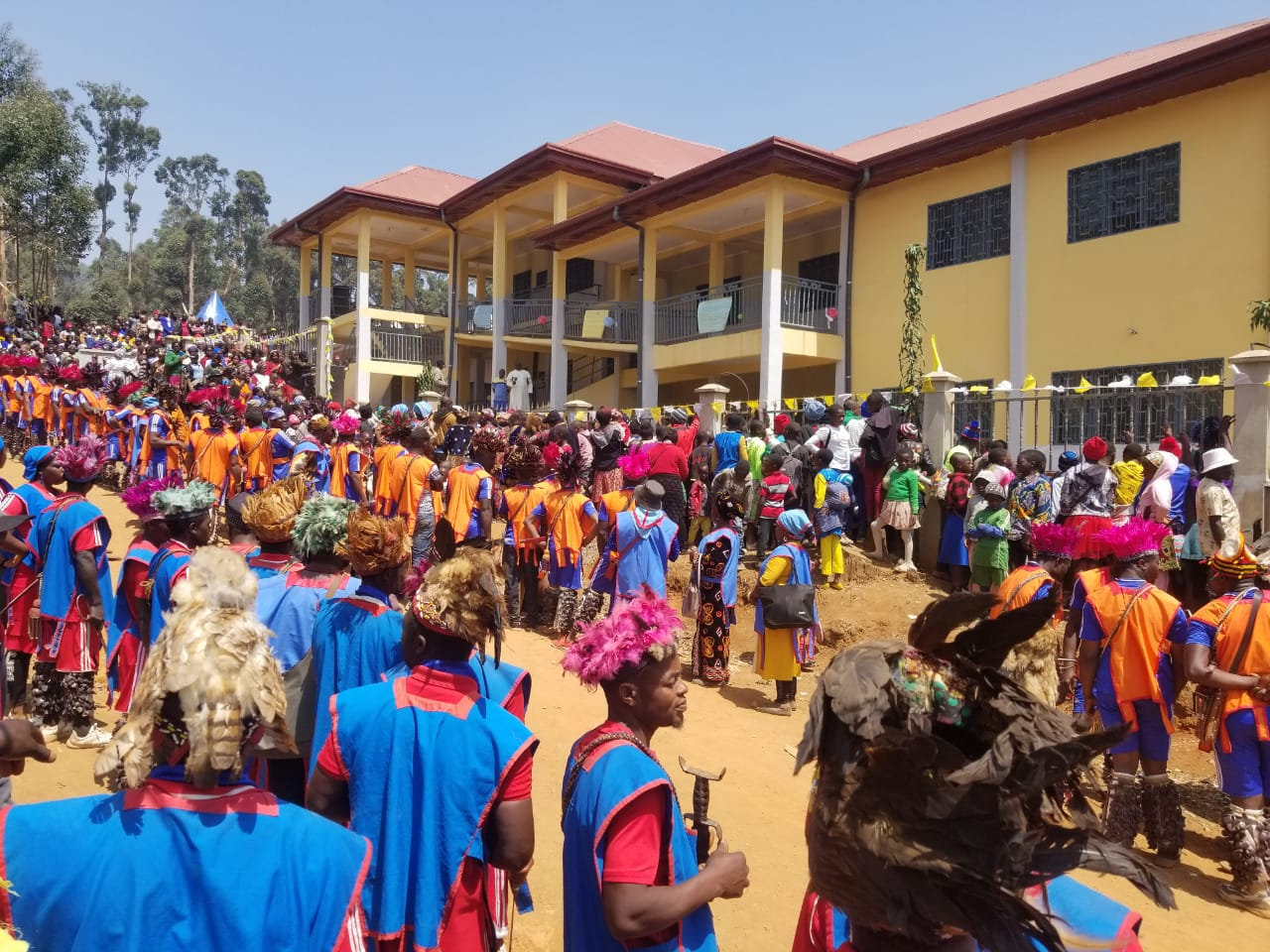
Inauguration of the Catholic Health Centre at Ntemndzem

The users of these health centers are mostly Mmuock Leteh denizens but a significant number of patients come from neighbouring villages seeking healthcare services. They offer all the services included in the minimum package as stipulated by the ministry of public Health which cover Laboratory tests, wound care, deliveries, Antenatal Consultations (ANC), Infant Welfare Clinics (IWC) and vaccinations.

Just like many other Health Centers in Cameroon, these two face similar difficulties including under staffing, under trained staff, lack of equipment and a difficult terrain which hinders community outreach efforts. Unfortunately also, the Wabane Health District is one of the few which does not have a District Hospital out of the 135 Health Districts in Cameroon. This makes patient referrals and counter referrals very difficult and occasionally, some critically ill patients have died on their way to better equipped centers in loung or Dschang in the Western Region.

=== Alternative medicine ===
Contemporary and traditional medicine have always coexisted in Cameroon sometimes with occasional rivalry. However, collaboration between both has been greatly enhanced since the ministry of public health officially recognised and integrated traditional medicine in the national health structure. In fact, the Chief Medical Officers (CMOs) are officially responsible for supervising the activities of traditional doctors in their district.

Traditional medicine is quite well developed in Mmuock Leteh, particularly the use of medicinal plants. In fact, the locality has a wide variety of medicinal plants, due to the uniqueness of its climate and many plant varieties that are relatively well exploited and used by traditional doctors. Before the opening of the first health centre in Mmuock Leteh, traditional medicine was central in the fight against disease and pursuit of health. The population has often resorted to this type of medicine, especially in rural areas and among the poor population because of the high costs of medical care and modern drugs as well as a deeply held believe in its efficacy.

In recent years, many scholars in the village have criticised traditional medicine practises arguing that it involves the use of plants including those whose efficiency, dose and harmlessness to humans have has not been determined. They have equally heavily criticised traditional medicine practitioners for their tendency to promote or engage in superstitious activities and witchcraft, including the dangerous prevalent practice of doing autopsies on corpses in order to determine the cause of death, which usually is concluded as witchcraft.
