= Wabane =

Coordinates: 5.1573°N 9.3673°E

- Commune and town
- Interactive map of Wabane
- Country: Cameroon
- Region: Wabane Sub-Division
- Department: Lebialem Division

Area
  - Total: 69 sq mi (180 km^{2})

Population
  - Total: 60,000 - 80,000
- Time zone: UTC+1 (WAT)

Wabane is a town and council/commune in Cameroon. It is the headquarters of Wabane sub-division in Lebialem division Southwest Region of Cameroon.

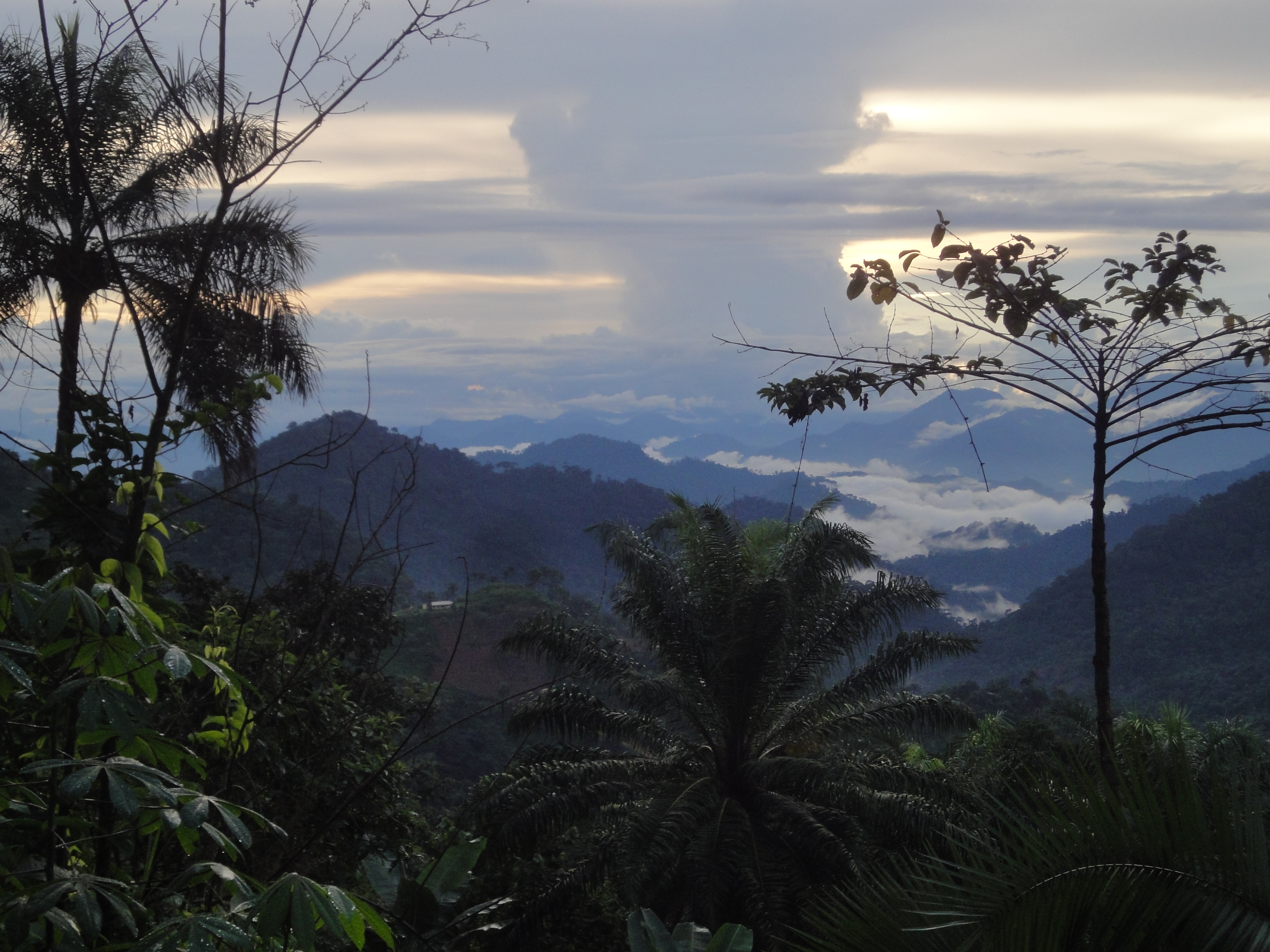
Panoramic view to the lower belt of Wabane, Southwest Region of Cameroon

== History ==
Wabane was selected and named at the second conference of the Mundani Elite Development Association, MEDA holding in Banteng, Bamumbu on 13 February 1988; the foundation of the town was laid on 31 December 1988. The Wabane Charter was signed on that occasion. Wabane is situated at the heart of the Mundani landmass, precisely at the point where the Bamumbu, Bechati and Folepi clan lands meet. The land on which Wabane is located was donated by the three clans.

== Geography ==
=== Topography ===
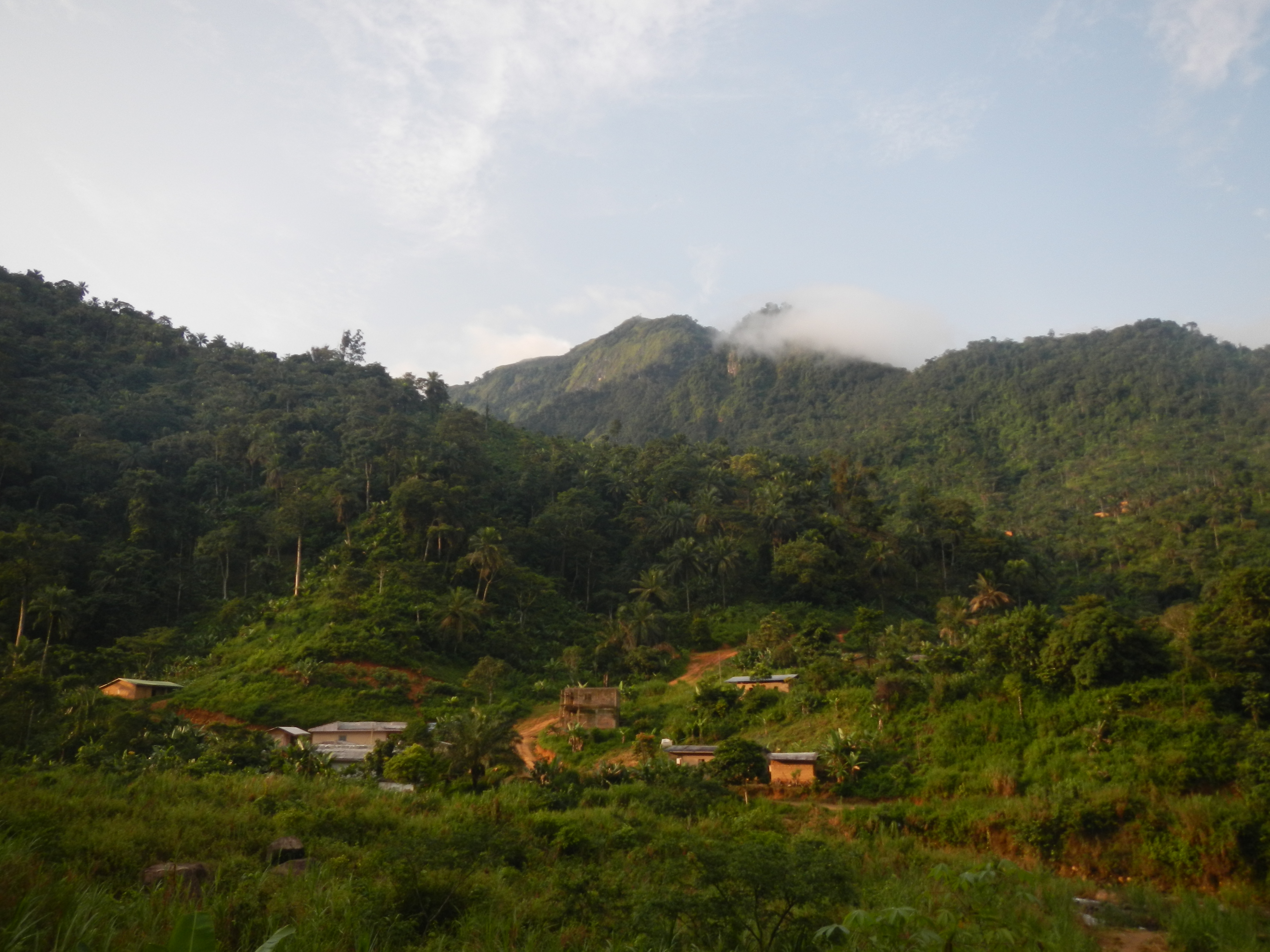
Small village named Alongkong in middle belt of Wabane

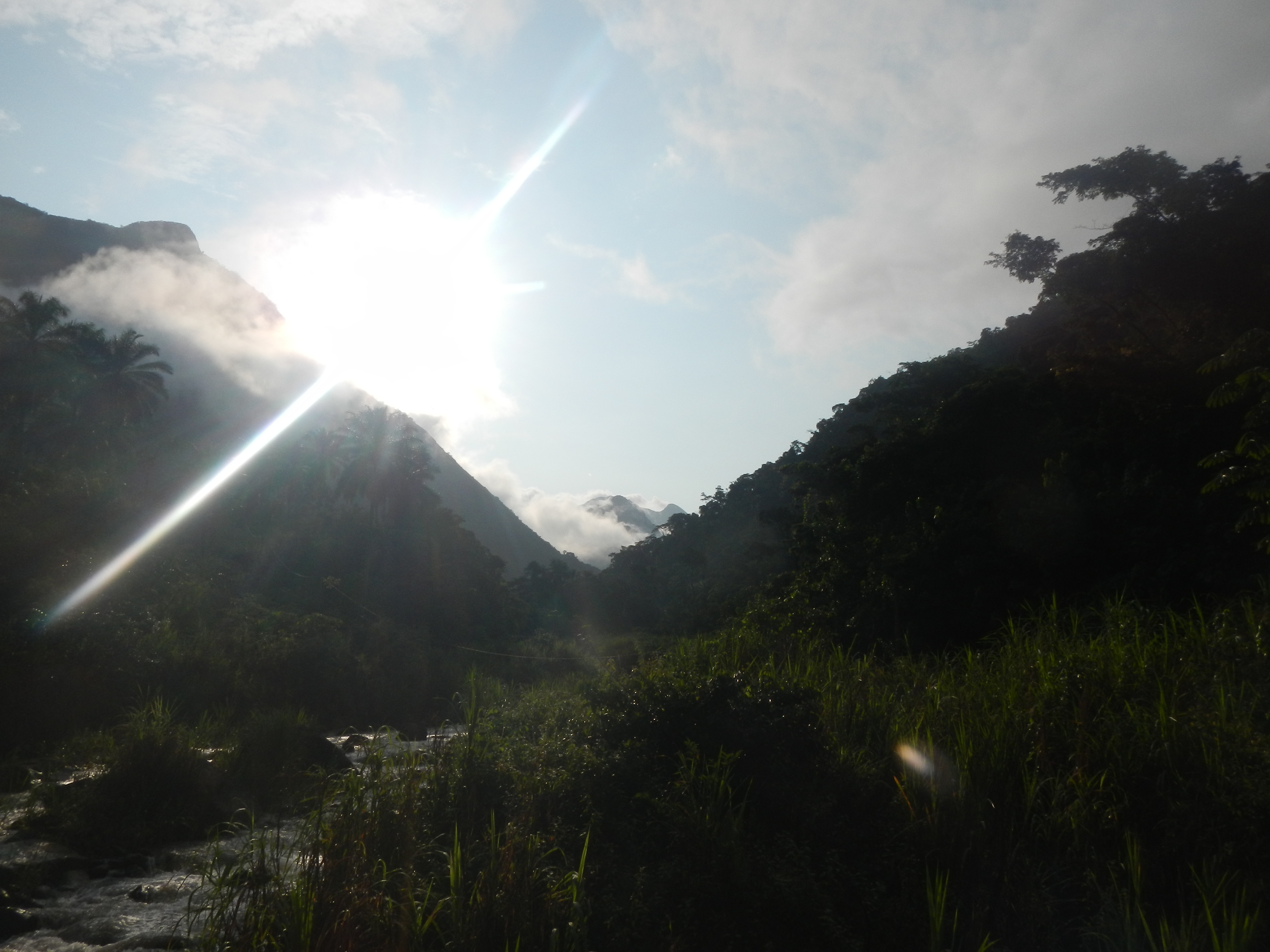
Hilly topography of Wabane

Wabane have three distinct topographical regions and marks the end of the Manyu plain. The landform is undulating and characterised by elevated, prominent mountainous terrain, with altitude ranging from lowland Nkong (72 m), Bechati and Besali (570 m), through Alongkong (1470 m) to M’mouck Leteh (2200 m). At the Bamumbu Fondom, hill slopes are steep to very steep, narrow boulder strewn crests and deeply incised valleys. The area of Mmuock Leteh is equally undulating but with broad hilltops and gentle slopes suitable for intensive vegetable farming.

=== Climate ===
The area experiences two seasons – the dry season that begins in November and ends in March and the rainy season that commences in April and stretches up to October. It has three zones owing to the difference in topography and vegetation. The lower belt popularly called lower Mundani has a characteristic hot temperature typical on a tropical forest zone. The middle belt where the council building is found has a higher altitude and the temperature is mild. The upper belt (North West) is tropical savanna with an altitude of up to 2100 m. Here the temperatures can go below 18 °C in the months of December to January.

=== Soils ===
The difference in altitude and vegetation types gives rise to different soil types. From the field studies, soils of the lower belt to parts of the middle belt can be described as sandy-loam to reddish alluvial (ferralsol). The soils of the lower belt are highly exploited for plantation agriculture (oil palm and cocoa plantations) and to a lesser extend subsistence crops like plantain, cassava, cocoyam, banana and pepper. The upper belt has rich alluvial and silty-loam soils interspersed with very barren chalk and clay soils. These soils serve for very high commercial market gardening crops like Irish potato, cabbage, carrots and leeks.

=== Wind types ===
Two main characteristic types of winds blow across the area. These are the North East Harmatan winds that come with the dry season and the Southeast monsoon that come with the rainy season. The coming of the Harmatan winds is noticed in the council area in the month of November by violent winds particularly in the upper plateau which more often than not cost great damages in buildings and crops. This violent effect of the winds is also noticeable in the month of March–April during their take-off which is a transitional period between the Harmatan and the quick-off of monsoon winds in May. However the monsoon winds operate in an atmosphere of a gentle breeze. The cold dry Harmatan and warm wet monsoon winds give rise to the characteristic cold dry season and warm rainy season of tropical climate, experienced in the council area.

=== Hydrology ===
The main rivers and streams in the council area are found in the lower and middle belt. There are equally many drinkable springs in the whole of the council area. The main river of the municipality known as river Meyi gets it rise from mount Bamboutous and to it is added many other tributaries downstream resulting in River Manyu. During the rainy season, many of these streams overflow their banks and become fast-flowing and dangerous to cross. The upper tropical savanna area of M’mouck Leteh, Atsuala, Magha and Fonenge have few streams and springs, many of the springs dry off in the dry season leading to acute water shortage both for household use and irrigation.

=== Vegetation ===
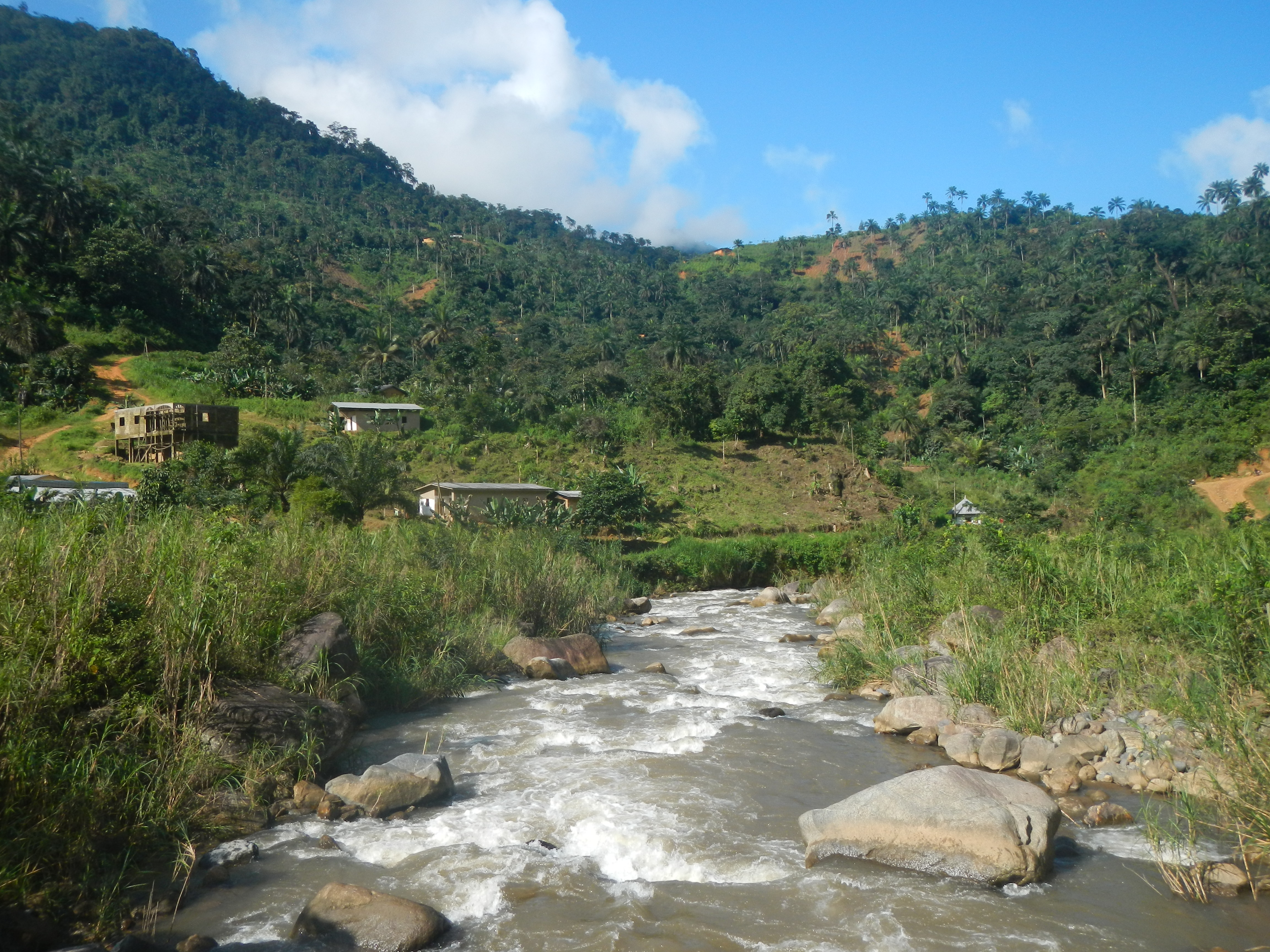
Typical landscape in the middle belt

There are three distinct vegetation types within the municipality. There is tropical forest vegetation in the lower parts from the villages of Nkong, Bangang through Besali to Egumbo; wooded savanna in the middle part around the villages Talung, Alongkong, Nchingang and Banteng and the tropical savanna vegetation at the higher attitudes of M’mouck Leteh to Magha. The lower tropical forest and the wooded middle zones hold the highest level of flora – timber and non-timber forest species including medicinal plants. Much of the primary forest have been converted to secondary forests and void of major timber species. The tropical savanna zone has grassy vegetation, with isolated patches of forest (stunted trees) or planted eucalyptus trees.

=== Fauna ===
The difference in vegetation type gives rise to a variety of wildlife species (mammals, reptiles, birds and insects). The Environment and Rural Development Foundation has listed a number of animal species that could be found in the forest and grassland vegetation of the Wabane Council Area – some that are rare or endangered. Amongst others are the primates (chimpanzees and western lowland mountain gorillas) to wild cats like African civets, genets, foxes, stone hayracks, antelopes, deer, caneras, grass cutters and a variety of avifauna species like the Bannerman's turaco and parrot. For fear of extermination of the above-mentioned primates the Environment and Rural Development Foundation is working alongside the Ministry of Wildlife to create a sanctuary in the lower Mundani zone though without some resistance from a fraction of the local population.

== Culture ==
=== Population ===
According to the council logbook the population estimate of the council area stands at 86,721 inhabitants spread over a surface area of 180 km^{2}. This gives a population density of 48 inhabitants/km^{2}. The field survey by the Center for Promotion of Local Development in 2011 puts the population at 62,342 inhabitants with a population density of 35 persons/km^{2}. Like in other parts of the country, the population of Wabane is made up of mostly young people. The ages 0–4 years and 5–14 years accounts for 21% of the population each, and 15–44 years 31%. Ages above 45 years accounts for only 27% of the total population. The youthful nature of the population is indicative of enormous need in education, health and future demands for employment.

Of the total population, 28,803 are males representing 46.20% while 33,538 females representing 53.80% of the population. The higher female population can be explained by the fact that more males migrate out of the municipality in search of jobs as there due to the low economic activity in the area. The following villages have more than 2,000 inhabitants: Bangang, Cham-Gomeveh, Fonenge, Agong, Nkong, Besali, Magha, Mmuock Leteh, Dih, Folepi, Fomenji, Bahne, Banti, Banteng, Atsuala, Bechati. These are areas of intense agricultural activities, host weekly markets or are comparatively easy to access to other divisions. It should be remarked that the village of Mbecho though very enclaved has one time been the capital of Wabane Sub Division – thus its population. The population of Wabane municipality is divided into the lower Mundani clan and the upper Mundani clan. The lower Mundani is made up of seven villages (Egumbo, Banti, Bechati, Folebi, Besali, Bangang and Nkong). They are governed by chiefs (popularly referred to as fons) while the upper Mundani is made up of nine villages – each traditionally administered by a third class chief. These third class chiefs are all answerable to the paramount ruler – a first class chief known as his royal majesty the fon of Bamumbu. Chieftaincy is hereditary in the Mundani clan. In the clan, the traditional rulers are generally called fons though the fall in three different categories as structured by the ministry of territorial administration and decentralization. The fons are directly assisted by the village council which is constituted of sub chiefs or quarter heads. The quarter heads are directly assisted by the ‘Nkems’ who act as the link between the family heads and the council.

As with other rural areas of the country, out-migration is common. In the Wabane council area, emigration is noticeable in the middle belt (urban space) as compared to the lower and the upper regions. This is due to the difficult topography, difficult access and the poor nature of the soils that make farming unrewarding.

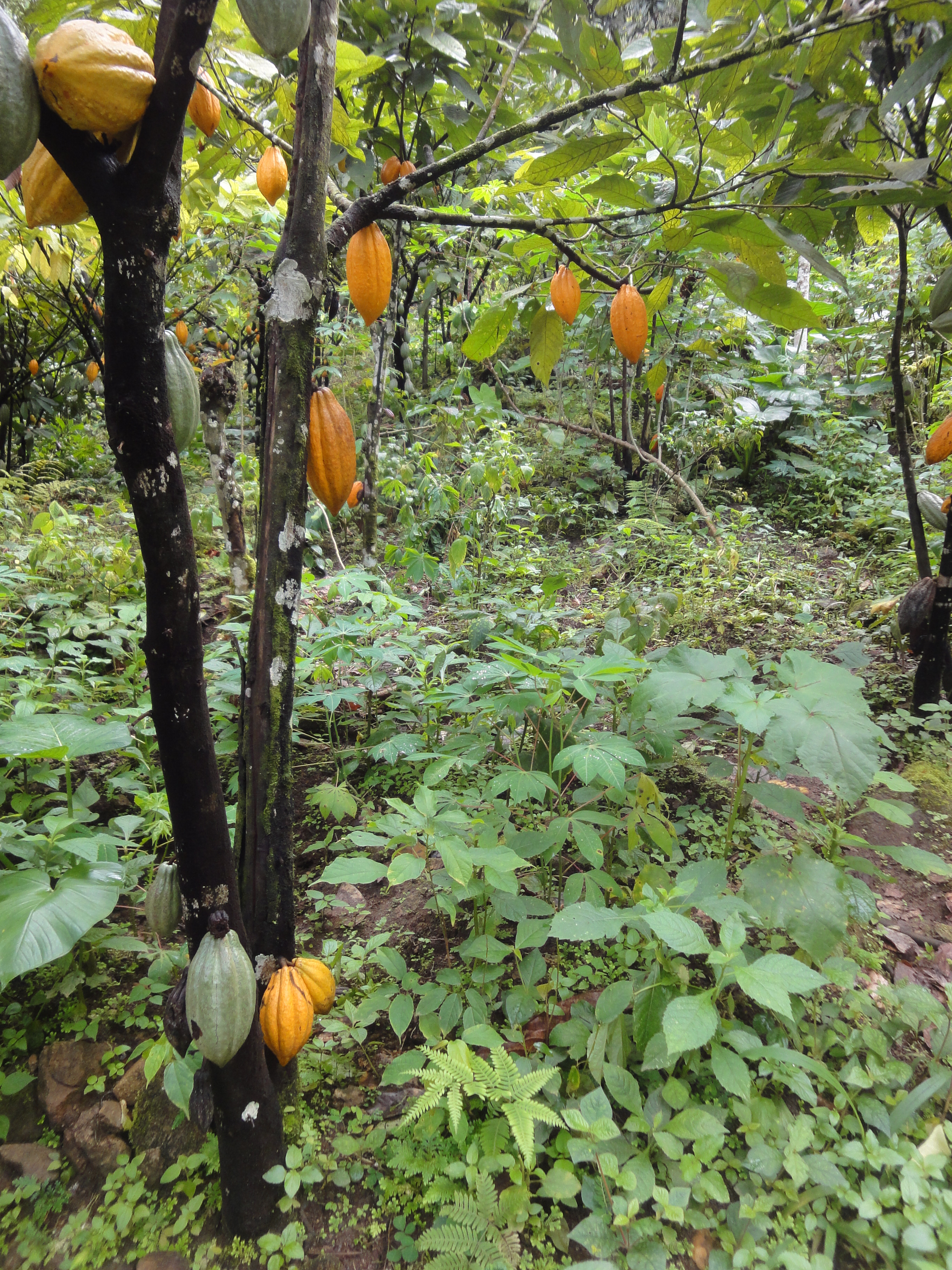
Cocoa plantation in Tabot (Wabane)

The huge production of palm oil and cocoa in the lower region and the Irish potato, cabbages, carrots in the upper region which is more accessible from nearby Dschang attract a considerable proportion of immigrant farmers from other areas of the division and makes the population more stable.

=== Ethnic groups ===
Wabane constitutes one main clan which is the Mundani clan - the population which can either be referred to as lower Mundani (those living at the lowlands of Bangang, Besali, Bechati, Folepi, Egumbo etc.) and upper Mundani (those living in the mid and highlands). These people are said to have originated from Widikum (Widikum people)from the Northwest Region (Cameroon). Others, the Mmuock tribe from the upper belt of Wabane Sub Division are also said to have migrated from Dschang in the West Region (Cameroon) as a consequence of the first world war and others especially from the lowland from upper Bayang in Manyu Division. The difference can be seen from their dressings, dance and their dialect. The main dialect is known as the Mundani language. Other tribes found within the municipality are the Bangwa, the Bamileki, the Bayang, the Meta' language and the Bassossi – most of them are civil servants.

=== Religion ===
Wabane municipality is receptive to all religious groups accepted in Cameroon. Christianity is the religion most practiced in the municipality. The prominent denominations in the area are Presbyterian, Catholic, Full gospel, Baptist, Apostolic, and others with nomadic Muslims spotted around the Western part of the upper belt. The religious groups serve the area with moral ethics and some social welfare services like health units and schools.

=== Land tenure system ===
Land ownership in the Wabane municipality is hereditary. The housing system in the Wabane council area is made up of non-permanent structures which make about 97%. The nature of building material is about 90% mud houses with thatch roofs or corrugated iron sheets. At most 3% housing is constructed of cement bricks with iron rods and majority of wooden houses are found in lower Mundani which is hotter. About 90% of the population of Wabane live around water sources like springs. This reflects the tendency of human settlement around natural water supply points. A majority of settlement patterns is dispersed except of linear settlement in the lower belt, with an example of Bechati and Besali in particular. This should have a direct link with their lowlands nature. Looking at the zonal spacing of Wabane council, the population of is settled on two main geographical landforms with about 40% living around the lowlands of the lower belt. While 60% occupy the rocky, hilly, undulating middle zone and the slopes and plateau of the far upper zone.

== Economy ==
The principal economic activity in the municipality is agriculture which occupies at least 95% of the production; therefore economic progress largely depends on the exploitation of agricultural potentials. Other economic investment activities are very low, probably due to the enclave nature of the area. The agricultural sector is dominated by the production of food and cash crops. Livestock and fishery activities equally prevail in the area, though to a lesser extent. This is seen by the rearing of animals like cattle, goats, sheep in the upper zone and in a general trend in the entire municipality, each household have a few fowls let in the wild and a pig sty with at least a pig. Some hunting is practised and fishing though to a very limited extent. Rural urban migration is significant in the council area due to the poor economic situation and low rate of social amenities thus posing a difficult livelihood. Supplementary economic activities like petit trading, and transport services are practiced by a very limited percentage of the population.

=== Assets, potentials and constraints of the biophysical milieu ===
The difference in topography, climate, vegetation and soil type provides the area with multiple assets, potentials as well as constraints. A variety of food crops grown in the area due to favourable climate maize, cassava, groundnut, oil palm, cocoyams, pepper, beans and okra in the lower and middle half to the Irish potato, cabbages, carrots, leeks, wheat, ginger of the upper regions of M’mouck Leteh and Magha. The tropical lowland forest area is a source of a variety of timber and non-timber forest products including medicinal plants and wildlife species. There is a great variety of birds species good for bird watching and research. Mammals and reptiles are found in the forest and grassland. Also endangered species such as chimpanzees and the western lowland gorilla, to wild cats like African civet, genets, foxes, stone hayracks and antelopes can be found. Deers, caneras, grass cutters and variety of avifauna like Bannerman's turacos and parrots are living in the area. The climate, altitude and vegetation of the lower, middle and upper regions enables the population to grow close to 80% of a variety of food and cash crops grown in the world - from cocoa, coffee, maize, cassava, groundnut, oil palm, cocoyams, pepper, beans and okra in the lower and middle half to the Irish potato, cabbages, carrots, leeks, wheat, ginger of the upper region of regions of M’mouck Leteh and Magha. It has many natural water sources like springs, mountain water and many rivers and streams. The rivers Meyi, Bangang, Bechati and Besali are huge sources of sand and stones for all construction works and the Anyoh-Ndeoh waterfall can be used to develop a rural electrification scheme. The rugged topography poses the problem of frequent soil creep and landslides. Additionally the enclavement of the council area in combination with the poor transport network causes inaccessibility.

=== Development actors ===
Local development actors in the Wabane area include:the Wabane Council, Bamumbu Development and Cultural Association (BADECA), Other Village Development Associations, Businessmen, Traditional rulers, Elites, Public services (Agriculture, Social Welfare, Gendarmerie, Health, Catholic mission, RUMPI). The Wabane council area does not have any home based NGO apart from Environmental Rural Development Foundation (ERuDeF) that comes periodically for research. As for CIGs many prevail in the Wabane Municipality.

=== Agriculture ===
More than 98% of the local population depends on subsistence farming and some small scale of commercial agriculture by the sale of produce from cash crops. This agriculture is supplemented by petit trading, fishing, hunting and transport services dominated by bike riders most particularly during the dry season though practiced by a minute proportion of the population. The agro-pastoral activities practiced in the municipality follow the bioclimatic condition of the different areas. The lower belt and part of the middle belt practice the cultivation of cash crops such as palm oil, cocoa, Robusta coffee, gathering of non timber forest products, and food crops like plantains, cocoyams, cassavas bananas, pepper etc. The degree of palm oil cultivation I the lower belt is very high as compared to the middle belt which is just modest while the extremes of the middle belt and the upper belt practice the cultivation of market gardening products like Irish potatoes, cabbages, carrots, garlic and licks, cocoyams, sweet yams, ginger etc. The intensity of market gardening in the Upper belt is very high. As well the rearing of cattle, goats, sheep and chicken etc. (Nkemteba J.T, 2002) and field survey by CEPLODEV team for WCD. The high intensity of palm oil production in the lower belt and gardening products in the upper belt results to a higher per capital income to local farmers of these two zones as compared to the middle zone where the local farmers have lower income earnings. This thus impacts the lower and upper belt with increased economic activities by the present of bigger markets than the middle belt. These increase agricultural activities generate secondary activities like transportation and commercial activities that lead to increase trade activities with the bordering Towns of Dschang, Mbouda and Bafoussam.

== Infrastructure ==
The basic social infrastructure includes two agricultural posts in Babong and Bechati, a community education and action center in Mbecho, nine government nursery schools, five confessional, one lay private and 30 public primary schools, two government high schools at Besali and Wabane, four secondary schools at Banteng, Bechati, Magha and Ntemnzem, three government technical colleges at Bechati, Talung and Ntemnzem, markets in Bechati and Ntemnzem, Cam Water and AES Sonel in Ntemnzem, health centers in Talung, Bechati, Mbecho, Banteng, Ntemnzem and Bangang.

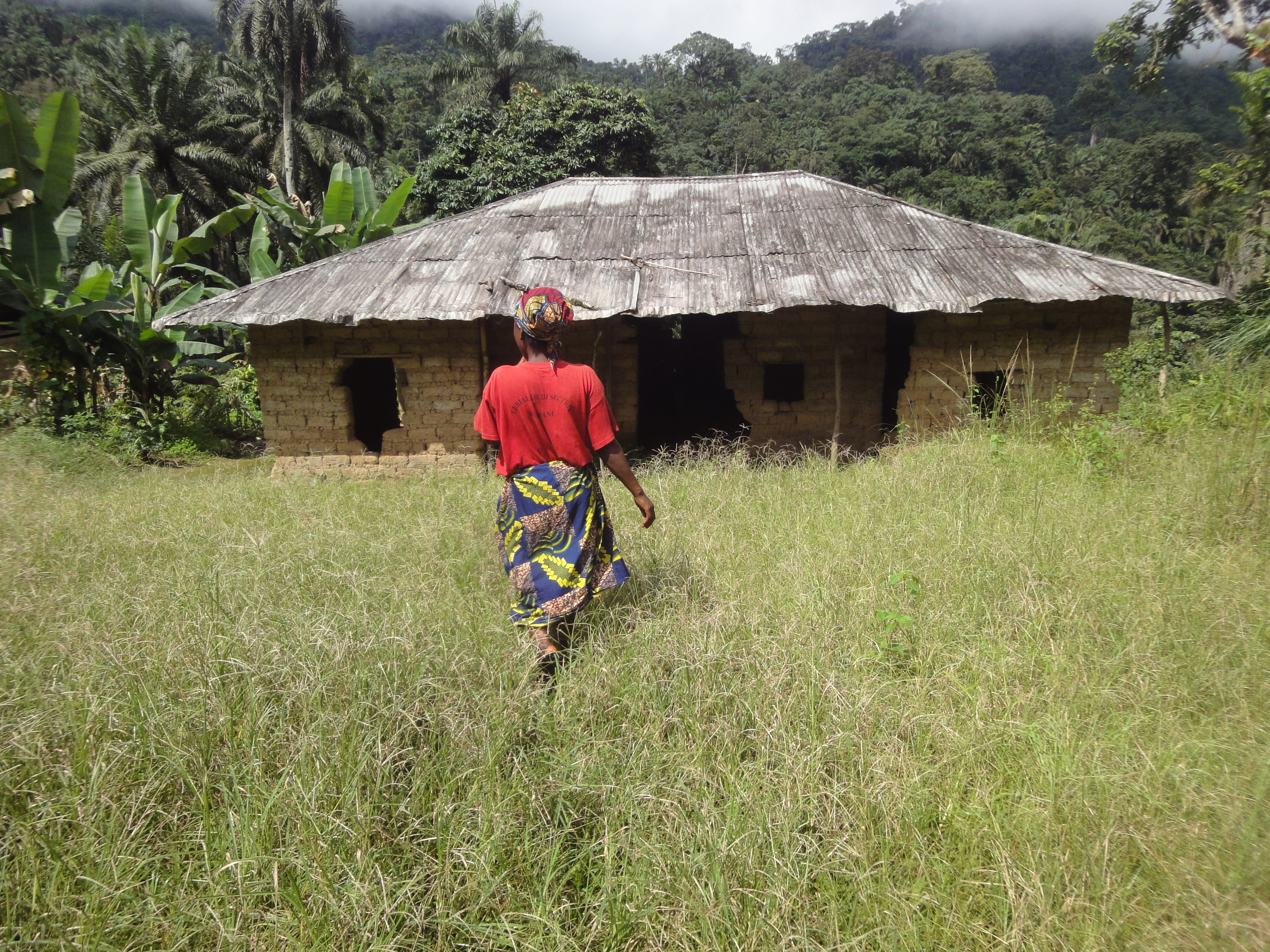
Primary School in Tabot (Wabane)

A few community banks have been implanted in Banteng, Bechati and Ntemndzem (Nkongle) in collaboration with the RUMPI project.

=== Health ===
In the domain of health in the municipality, malaria crisis are most registered with at least 7 persons in every ten individuals carrying the Plasmodium parasite that causes malaria and next to it is typhoid fever. The situation of HIV/AIDS in the municipality is still without a lot of facts given that the population shy away from making known their status as the consider it to be a sabotage for someone to be heard infected by the killer disease. However many communities testified that in the late 90s and early 2,000 many deaths due to HIV/AIDS were registered but most of the deaths were family members from towns and just a few from their village communities. However HIV/AIDS cases are not that rampant in the municipality. Among the vulnerable groups of the municipality, the orphans and widows occupy a more significant proportion. Many widow associations were identified in the council area, amongst them are registered the Mbecho widows association, Banteng Widows association, Banti widows association, Ntemndzem widows association etc. The number of widows is quite high. This can partly be explained by the fact that polygamous marriages are rampant in the municipality and it is demographically accepted that more men than women die due to their strenuous activities and every one man dead leaves behind one or more wives in destitution. Generally vulnerable groups are not benefiting any special treatment.

== Wabane Council ==
=== History ===
The Wabane council is one of the three councils in Lebialem Division of the Southwest region. The Wabane council was created by decree No 95/082 of 24/4/95 in April 1995. It has a surface area of 180 km^{2} with a population of 63,818 people (field data). The council has been managed since then by four mayors in three successive mandates - Mr. Manfred Nkonganyi Fontem, Tanyi Simon Kedju, Jong Manasseh Teba, who came in to complete the turn of predecessor and Nembo Ketu Israel. The council headquarters is in Babong Bamumbu and manages an estimated population of 86,721 inhabitants occupying a total surface area of 180 km^{2}.

=== Staff ===
It has 31 councillors 5 of whom are female and the rest 26 are male. The council has a work force of 22 staff. Out of the 22 man power, 19 are permanent workers while 3 temporary staff.

=== Facilities ===
Hydropower plants:

- Alongkong at river Funi
- Ntemndzem
- Tabot at river Melop

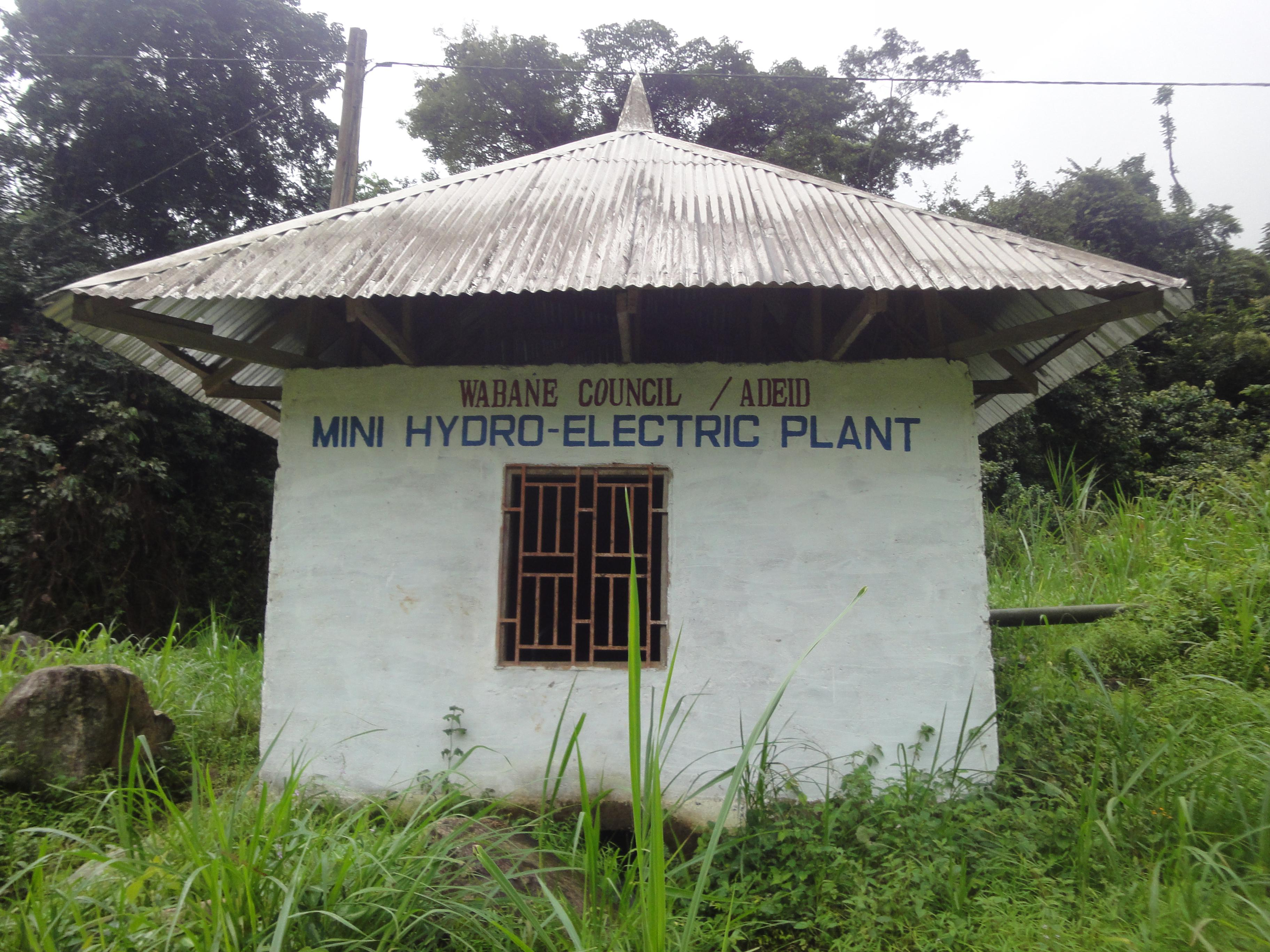
Hydro power plant in Alongkong (Wabane)

Tap water:

- Alongkong
- Babong
- Bangang
- Banteng
- Bechati
- Besali
- Folepi
- Magha
- Mbecho
- Nchingang
- Nkong
- Ntemndzem
- Talung

Secondary school:

- Bechati
- Magha
- Ntemndzem

High school:

- Banteng
- Besali
- Wabane

Technical school:

- Bechati
- DIH
- Wabane

Health center:

- Bangang
- Banteng
- Bechati
- Mbecho
- Mmock Leteh
- Talung

Library:

- Ati-Ayumangume
- Besali
- Nchingang

Market:

- Babong
- Banteng
- Bechati
- Magha
- Mbecho
- Nkongle
- Wabane

Women empowerment center:

- Mbecho

Agricultural post:

- Babong
- Bechati

=== Financial Resources ===
The main source of revenue for the Wabane council comes from transfers from FEICOM. Internal income recovery rate stands at 60 to 65%. Annual investment rates for 2009 and 2010 went from 58% to 60%, respectively.

=== Collaborators ===
The Wabane council works closely or in collaboration with following services:

(a) Government technical services: social affairs, basic education, secondary education, women affair, agriculture, energy, transport, forestry, small and medium size enterprise, health, livestock;

(b) Administration: Sub divional officer, divional officer and traditional authorities;

(c) Civil society and parastatals: religious authorities, FEICOM, BADECA, ADEID, Southwest Development Agency (SOWEDA), RUMPI Project, Centre de Formation pour Administration Municipale (CEFAM), Programme National de Développement Participatif (PNDP);

(d) Business partners: economic operators, professional bike rider's union.

== Touristic information ==
The Wabane council area has two distinct vegetation types of forest vegetation and savanna type. While the forest vegetation demonstrates a great diversity of forest species including plants and animals, the savanna type holds great touristic sites including beautiful sceneries of savanna vegetation, the plateau and vegetation itself, the slopes and more particularly the beautiful mountainous landscape in the upper and middle zones. The tropical forest of the lower zone holds a great diversity of wildlife that attracts researchers and conservationists. Outstanding touristic features include Mount Magha, Mount Mangwa (“Mont Bamboutus”), the Ndeoh Waterfall.

== See also ==
- Communes of Cameroon
- Menji
- Alou, Cameroon
