= YBB =

YBB may refer to:

- Kugaaruk Airport, Nunavut, Canada, IATA airport code YBB
- Yemba language, in Cameroon, ISO 639-3 language code ybb
