= Alou, Cameroon =

Coordinates: 5.1573°N 9.3673°E

Alou
- Commune and town
- Interactive map of Alou
- Country: Cameroon
- Region: Southwest
- Department: Lebialem
- Time zone: UTC+1 (WAT)

Alou is a town and commune in the South-West region of Cameroon. The Alou sub-division constitute one of the three sub-divisions (Alou, Wabane and Fontem) in the Lebialen division. This town/village got its name from the foggy nature of the climate, especially during the raining season. Alou in the Ngwe language means “Fog”.

== Divisions ==
Besides Alou itself, the urban area of Alou is divided into several districts such as Emollah, Kongho, Nwametaw, Njenafey, Njenallah and Ndungated etc. Far from the urban area, the rural area of the municipality of Alou contains seven villages:

- Attraction
- Fonjometaw
- Lewoh
- M’mouck
- M’mouckbie
- Ndungated
- Nwangong

== Economic activities ==
The council area experiences limited economic diversity, primarily relying on agriculture as its main source of income. The majority of its residents are engaged in farming, earning an average monthly income of 30,000 FCFA (SDDARD Alou). The M’muock zone stands out as a hub for intense farming activities, where heavy trucks are a common sight, transporting various vegetable crops like Irish potatoes, cabbage, carrots, and leeks to neighboring cities such as Dschang, Douala, and Kumba.

Aside from agriculture, the inhabitants are also involved in off-licence sales, running restaurants, and engaging in small-scale trade, particularly in provision stores. These provision stores are typically situated around the permanent markets, with many of the store owners residing in other villages and operating their businesses primarily on market days.

Furthermore, economic groups like builders (including carpenters and bricklayers), auto mechanics, and tailors play an active role in the villages, contributing to the local economy with an average monthly income of about 10,000 FCFA.

== See also ==
- Communes of Cameroon
