= Linguapax Prize =

International Linguapax Award
- Awarded for: Outstanding contributions in the field linguistic diversity and/or multilingual education
- Country: Spain
- Presented by: Linguapax (Linguapax International)
- First award: 2002
- Website: http://www.linguapax.org/

The International Linguapax Award is awarded annually on International Mother Language Day (21 February) by Linguapax (Linguapax International) "which recognises and awards the actions carried out in different areas in favour of the preservation of linguistic diversity, revitalization and reactivation of linguistic communities and the promotion of multilingualism". Candidates are individuals of the academic community and civil society as well as entities or collectives. Nominations for each year's prize are usually made public on 21 February of each year.

== Linguapax Award Winners ==
The International Linguapax Award was first given in 2002.

Year	Name	Affiliation	Country(ies)
2002	Bartomeu Melià	Teko Guaraní	Spain, Paraguay
2002	Jerzy Smolicz	University of Adelaide	Poland, Australia
2003	Aina Moll	Institute Joan Alcover	Spain
2003	Tove Skutnabb-Kangas	University of Roskilde	Finland, Denmark
2004	Fernand de Varennes	Murdoch University	Canada, Australia
2004	Joshua Fishman	Yeshiva University, Stanford University	United States
2005	Maurice Tadadjeu	University of Yaoundé I	Cameroon
2006	Natividad Mutumbajoy	Escuela Yachaicury	Colombia
2007	Maya Khemlani David	University of Malaya	Malaysia
2008	Neville Alexander	PRAESA	South Africa
2009	Katerina Te Heikoko Mataira	Te Ataarangi	New Zealand
2010	Miquel Siguan i Soler	University of Barcelona	Spain
2010	Robert Phillipson	Copenhagen Business School	UK, Denmark
2011	G. N. Devy	Gujarat	India
2011	Centro Indígena de Investigaciones Interculturales de Tierradentro	Cauca	Colombia
2012	Jon Landaburu Illaremendi		Colombia, France
2013	Ledikasyon pu Travayer		Mauritius
2014	Escola Valenciana - Federació d'Associacions per la Llengua		Valencia, Spain
2015	Xavier Albo	Fundación Xavier Albo	Bolivia
2016	Yambirrpa School Council and Dijarrma Action Group		Australia
2016	International and Heritage Languages Association		Canada
2017	Matthias Brenzinger	Centre for African Linguistic Diversity	South Africa, Germany
2018	BASAbali		Indonesia
2019	Larry Kimura	University of Hawaiʻi	Hawaii
2020	Marja-Liisa Olthuis	Oulu University	Finland
2021	Idara Baraye Taleem-o-Taraqi		Pakistan
2022	ADN Maya collective		Mexico
2023	Abduweli Ayup		China, Norway
