= Ngwe language =

Grassfields language spoken in Cameroon

Ngwe
- Native to: Cameroon
- Native speakers: 73,000 (2001)
- Language family: Niger–Congo?: Atlantic–Congo; Volta-Congo; Benue–Congo; Bantoid; Southern Bantoid; Grassfields; Eastern Grassfields; Mbam-Nkam; Bamiléké; West Bamileke; Bamboutos; Ngwe

Language codes
- ISO 639-3: nwe
- Glottolog: ngwe1238

Ngwe (Ŋwɛh, Nweh) is a Bamileke language spoken predominantly in Lebialem, Cameroon. As of 2001, Ngwe had 73,200 speakers, which was an increase from the numbers of previous censuses. Its closest relatives are Yemba and Ngiemboon.

== Writing system ==
Ngwe Alphabet
a	b	c	d	e	ə	ɛ	f	g	gh	'	h	i	j	k	kh	l
m	n	ŋ	o	ɔ	p	pf	r	s	t	ts	u	ʉ	v	w	y	z

== Phonology ==
=== Vowels ===
It has at least thirteen vowels, /i y e ɛ æ ɐ ɑ ɔ o u ɯ ɤ ʌ/. /ɤ ʌ/ are centralised. /y/ sounds somewhat like [ø] or [œ] and has a tongue position similar to that of /ɑ/, but with the jaw raised and the lips very close together.
