= Bartomeu Melià =

Paraguayan anthropologist (1932–2019)

Bartomeu Melià SJ
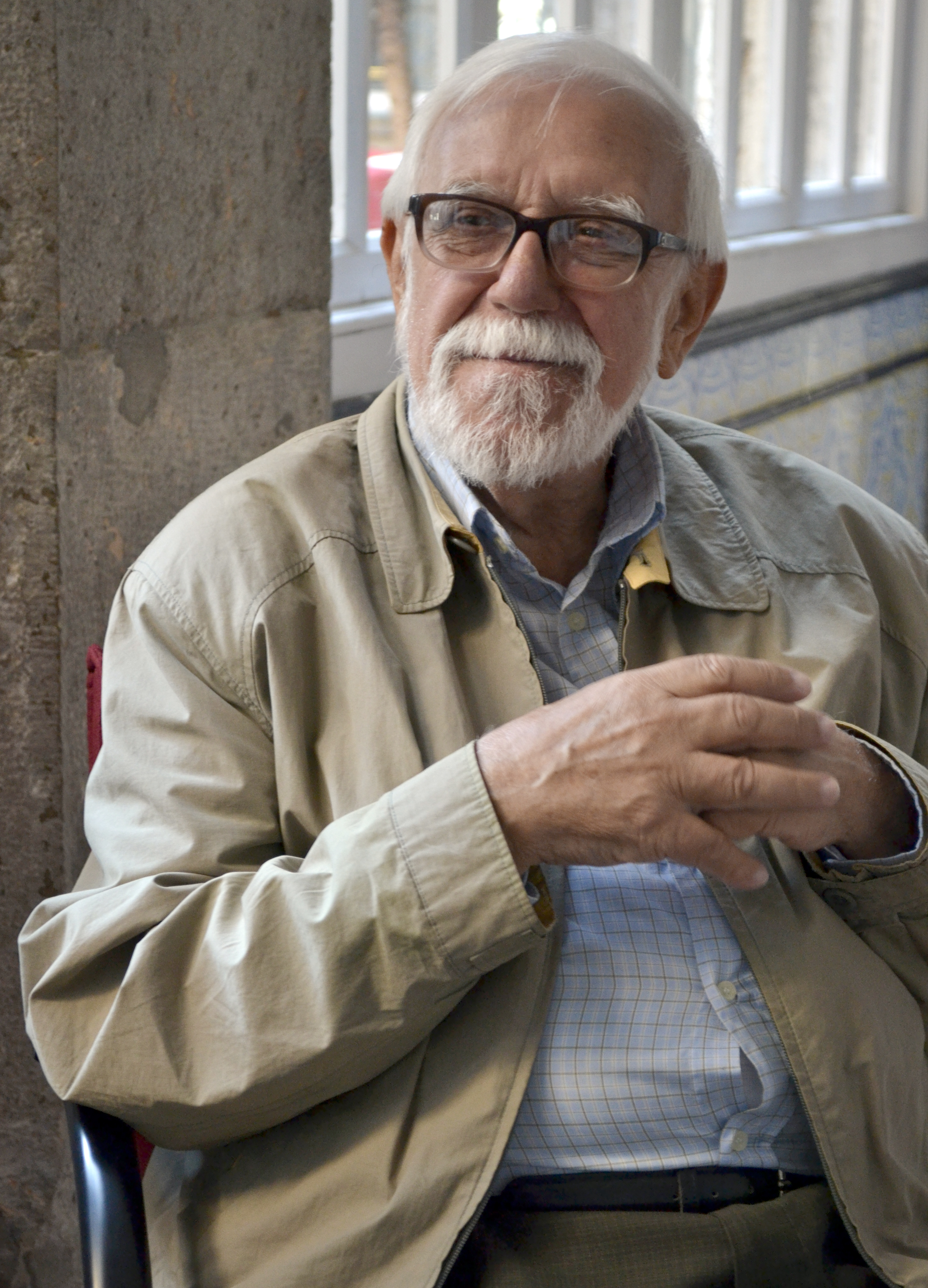
- Melià in 2011
- Born: Bartomeu Melià Lliteres; December 7, 1932; Porreres, Spain
- Died: December 6, 2019 (aged 86); Asunción, Paraguay
- Awards: National Order of Merit; Ramon Llull Award; Linguapax Prize

Academic background
- Education: University of Strasbourg (PhD)
- Thesis: La creación de un lenguaje cristiano en las misiones de los guaraníes en el Paraguay (1969)

Bartomeu Melià Lliteres SJ (December 7, 1932 – December 6, 2019) was a Spanish Jesuit, linguist and anthropologist, with Paraguayan citizenship since 2011. He specialized in the study of the Guaraní people and their language. For publicly accusing the Paraguayan government of committing a genocide against its indigenous peoples, he was exiled from the country from 1976 to 1989.

== Biography ==
He was born in Porreres, a Spanish town on the island of Mallorca.

Melià joined the Society of Jesuits on October 15, 1949. He settled in Paraguay in 1954 and was ordained a priest. In 1969, he obtained a doctorate from the University of Strasbourg. He was editor of the current affairs magazine Acción published by the Catholic Church from 1969 to 1974. From 1976 to 1989, he was expelled from Paraguay by the Stroessner regime. He settled in Mato Grosso do Sul, Brazil during his expulsion.

He was a professor of ethnology and Guarani culture at the Catholic University of Asuncion and was president of the Center for Anthropological Studies.

== Awards and honors ==
He was awarded the Linguapax Prize and the Ramon Llull Award in 2002. He was a member of the Academia Paraguaya de la Lengua Española. He was awarded the National Order of Merit by the Paraguayan government in 2012 and an honorary doctorate by the National University of Misiones in 2015.

An award was made in his honor by the Organization of Ibero-American States.

== Works ==
- El Guaraní Conquistado y Reducido: Ensayos de Etnohistoria (1993)
- La Lengua Guaraní en el Paraguay Colonial (2002)
