= Mmuock =

Tribe in Cameroon

Mmuock (or Mmock) is the Anglicised form of Muòk (m̩muɔk)—sometimes written as Mǒk (see next paragraph). The exonym is Bamock. Mmuock is a tribe in the West/Southwest of Cameroon. Belonging to the Bamilike ethnic group, the Mmuock tribe comprises four villages: M'mock Lelieng (Fossung ellelem), Mmuock Fossimondi (M'muockngie), Mmockmbie, and Mmuock Leteh. The first three villages are found in the English-speaking Lebialem Division in the Southwest Region of Cameroon, while Mmock Leleng lies in the french-speaking West Region.

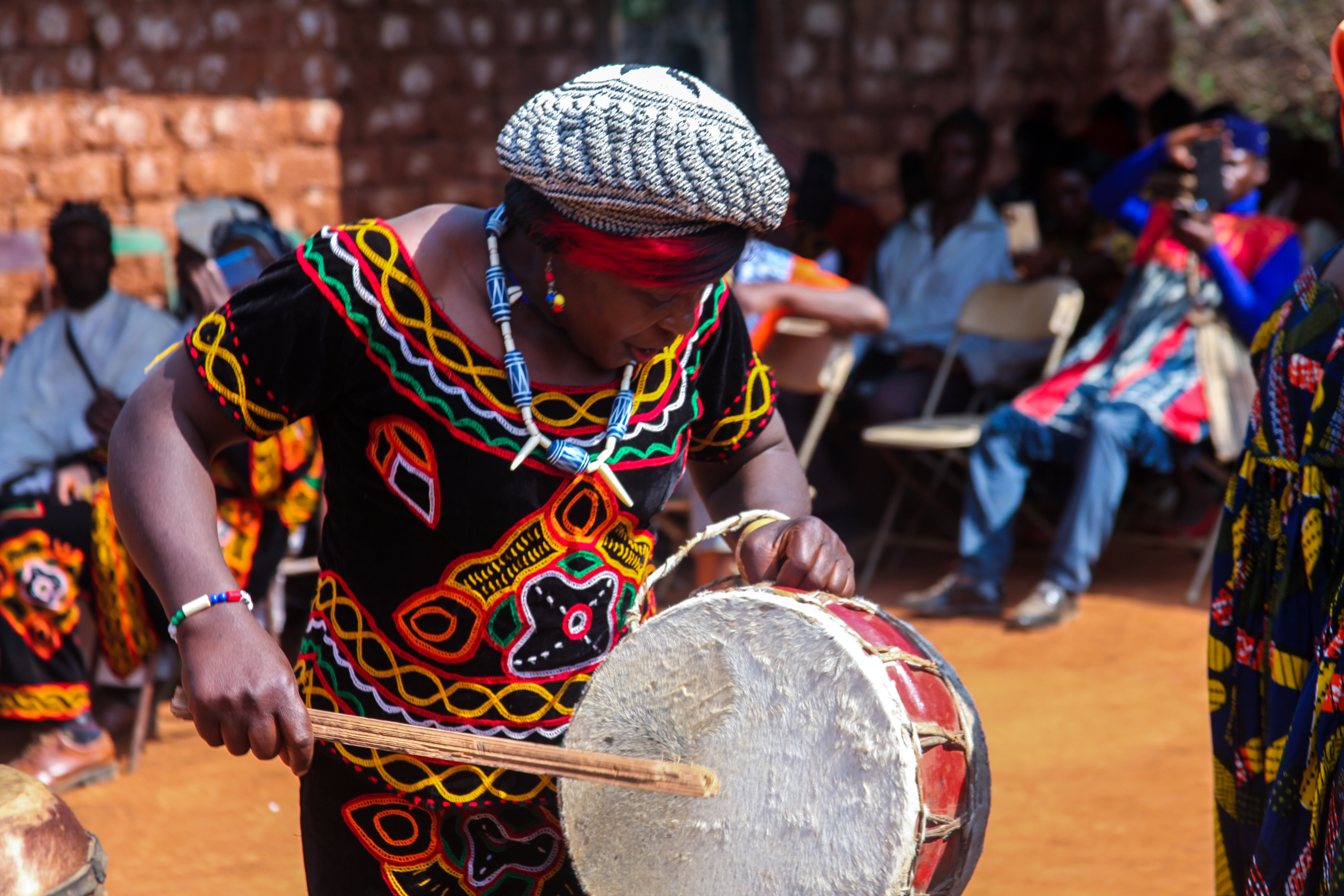
A performance of Mmuock culture

The Mmuock tribe speaks the Mmuock (Mmock) language. Due to dialectal differences within Mmuock (Mmock) communities, the name of the tribe is pronounced Yemba pronunciation: [m̩muɔːk] in Mmuock-Leteh and Mmuock-Fossimondi, andYemba pronunciation: [m̩mok] in the other two villages. As a result, there are two Anglicised spellings: Mmuock and Mmock.

== Etymology ==
The word Muòk (or Moòk) means fire in the Mmuock language. There have been two different origin stories to the name. According to the first story, when four brothers, who later founded the four villages, separated, each was to make a fire if attacked; the smoke from the fire would alert the others. According to the second story, the name was given by the people of Bafou as a result of their inability to defeat and capture the four brothers.

== Names of days of the week ==
In the Mmuock culture, there are eight days in the week. The week days, in order, are as follow:

1. Ngangà (the first day)
2. Mbeqgnúá (Betaâgnúá)
3. Mbeqlěq
4. Njœêngong (Ngong)
5. Mbeqńkœó
6. Njœêlekœr̄
7. Fa'à
8. Télǎng (Njœeláh).

The first day, Ngangè, is a public holiday and a day of rest; no manual labour is permitted. The second day is the market day.
