= Jerzy Smolicz =

Polish sociologist (1935–2006)

Jerzy Jarosław Smolicz AM (2 February 1935, in Warsaw – 3 November 2006, in Adelaide), also known as J. J. "George" Smolicz, was a Polish-born sociologist and educationalist acknowledged widely as a major contributor to cultural understanding in Australia. A key figure in developing and implementing Australia's multicultural and language policies, he was a Senior Consultant on Multiculturalism to the Fraser government and for 20 years was Chair of the Multicultural Education Committee in South Australia.

== Award ==
In 1988, Smolicz was awarded an AM in recognition of his services to Australian multiculturalism, and in 2002 received the inaugural UNESCO Linguapax Prize for his "lifelong contribution to the study of language policy in linguistically diverse societies".

== Research and Teaching ==
Smolicz was an academic staff member of the Department of Education at the University of Adelaide for 39 years. Appointed as a lecturer in 1965, he was promoted through the ranks and, in 1987, appointed to a Personal Chair in Education. He taught in the field of Sociology of Education at two levels: to graduate students doing a Graduate Diploma in Education as preparation for teaching in secondary schools and at Masters level for those preparing to become research students. His teaching followed his diverse research interests, which included the history and sociology of science and its implications for science teaching; the functionalist theory of the American sociologist Robert K. Merton and its application to aggression, competition and equality of opportunity in schools; the concepts and method of humanistic sociology, derived from the Polish-American sociologist, Florian Znaniecki; the application of humanistic sociology to understanding cultural and linguistic pluralism and its implications for education in Australia; and language policies in linguistically plural societies.

=== Cultural and Linguistic Pluralism ===
His pioneering research on cultural and linguistic pluralism was based on respondents from different ethnic communities in and around Adelaide. He was interested in asking immigrant parents and their children about their experiences in trying to maintain in the home a language and culture which were different from those of mainstream Australian society. Together with research students over a span of more than thirty years, he investigated groups of respondents from many different communities (Italian, Greek and Armenian; Polish, Croatian and Ukrainian; Ethiopian and Arab; Chinese and Indian; Vietnamese, Cambodian, Uighur and Filipino, as well as Welsh people and mainstream Anglo-Celtic Australian).

== Publications ==
Many of his publications were the result of collaboration with research students who later became colleagues.

- He wrote monographs and articles about history and sociology of science with Alessandro Gardini and Edward Nunan.
- In 1981, he wrote a book on children from Polish immigrant families in Australian schools was a joint work with research student and later colleague, Dr Margaret Secombe. (A Polish translation appeared in 1990.)
- He conducted a study in 1984 of the adaptation and assimilation of young Australians of Polish ancestry, published in Polish, was a joint enterprise with an early research student, now Professor Roger Harris. It was awarded the Florian Znaniecki prize by the Polish Academy of Sciences.

Co-authors of journal articles and book chapters included:

- Dr Giancarlo Chiro, on Italian language and culture
- Dr Dorothy Hudson on cultural valence among respondents from mainstream and minority ethnic backgrounds
- Chenny Yiv on university students of Cambodian background
- Malathi Murugaian on Indian background students
- Lillian Lee on Chinese background students
- Dr Illuminado NIcal on Filipino background students and language policy in the Philippines
- Dr Arthur Hughes on Welsh language maintenance in Australia.

== Theory of multiculturalism ==
To make sense of the results from these studies, Smolicz developed a theory of multiculturalism. This held that the central, most important parts of ethnic minority cultures - what he termed the group's core values - were held in balance with the key values of Australian society as a whole. These latter values, which could be envisaged as overarching all groups in society, related to areas of life which those living in Australia needed to know, if they were to be free to participate in mainstream public life, rather than disadvantaged or marginalised.

Such overarching values included democratic ideals, rights and responsibilities; English as the common language of the nation and the political, legal and economic patterns which applied to all citizens and residents. In balance with these commonalities was the recognition that a wide range of cultural diversity could exist in other areas of life, such as home languages, religious beliefs and practices, patterns of family life, music, art and architecture, food and festivities, sports and leisure pursuits. Ethnic communities could maintain their core values in these areas for the well-being of their individual members, the vitality of their community life and for sharing with other interested Australians, without denying their commitment to the nation of Australia. This sort of cultural interaction within and among individuals from both mainstream and minority ethnic backgrounds would provide the basis for Australia to become an ongoing and dynamic multicultural nation. These ideas are most fully developed in Smolicz's 1979 book, Culture and Education in a Plural Society, and the 1999 book, J. J. Smolicz on Education and Culture.

The main thrust of Smolicz's research findings and theory can be seen most clearly in the area of languages. All the different studies revealed that many immigrant parents wished to maintain their own language in the home - alongside the use of English in public domains, as the common language of the nation. They wanted their children to be competent in English and to have literacy skills in the home language as well. And many of the children shared these aspirations. Through the 1960s and early 1970s, however, the school curriculum did not allow these invaluable linguistic resources in other languages to be developed for the enrichment of the individual children and their families, as well as the benefit of Australian society. English was the taken for granted language of instruction throughout education, while until the late 1960s the only other languages taught in schools were Ancient Greek, Latin, French and German. Furthermore, the study of these was restricted to students in the upper IQ range of secondary schools. The one exception to this was the mother tongue teaching being provided by community-based ethnic schools, without any public recognition or support.

The conclusion which Smolicz reached was that the achievement of a dynamic and lasting multicultural Australia hinged on the teaching of languages to all students, as an integral part of the curriculum from the beginning of primary schooling. There were, however, two sides to this which needed to be considered. The first was the right of students whose home language was other than English to be able to study the language of their home - their mother tongue - somewhere in the school system, or in some recognised structure complementary to it. For most ethnic communities, the maintenance of their language was essential if the group's cultural life was to remain vibrant and able to be shared with others. Without the language, the group's culture tended to disintegrate into residues, as members assimilated more and more into the culture of the mainstream group.

The other side was the importance of all students whose home language was English being able to study a language other than their own throughout their years at school. Learning another language had been shown to encourage the sort of positive attitude to other cultures which was needed for mainstream support of multicultural policies. It was also important to ensure that those whose mother tongue was English were not denied the sorts of cognitive, linguistic, cultural and occupational advantages of bilingualism, advantages which those of minority ethnic background enjoyed wherever they had been able to maintain their mother tongue.

== Education for a Cultural Democracy ==
These two sides of language learning in the Australian context are clearly reflected in the recommendations of the 1984 Report presented to the South Australian Minister of Education by the Taskforce to Investigate Multiculturalism and Education, which was chaired by Smolicz. The Report was entitled Education for a Cultural Democracy.

One of the report's chief recommendations was that English plus one other language be an integral part of the curriculum for all children from the beginning of their schooling. The other languages taught were to include the most frequently spoken community languages like Italian, Greek, German, Chinese and Vietnamese.

Another recommendation was that the network of part-time ethnic schools should have government funding and be accepted as a complementary schooling system. In addition, the Report recommended the establishment of a School of Languages which offered a range of ethnic community languages not taught in the mainstream schools. These were to be available to students in all sectors of schooling as Year 12 subjects which counted toward university entrance. These recommendations were accepted by the government of the day and implemented in South Australian schools over the following years, although languages have still not been accepted as an integral part of the senior secondary curriculum, except in International Baccalaureate schools.

Smolicz shared his research findings and policy implications with his education students over many years. Those from minority ethnic backgrounds (approximately a third of education students) found, usually for the first time in their formal education, that knowledge about their family's language and culture was being included as part of the content of what they were taught. Many found it a liberating and confirming experience. Most of the other two thirds of the students, of Anglo-Celtic mainstream background had little or no idea of the extent of cultural diversity in Australia, of its nature and significance and its potential benefits for Australian society. A good number were attracted to the possibilities of cultural interaction within a multicultural nation and as teachers went on to show their enthusiasm and commitment in the ways they taught and interacted with their students.

== MECC ==
The practical implementation of multicultural theories at the day to day level of school organization and teaching represented another level of Smolicz's contribution. This can be seen chiefly in his work as Chair of the Ministerial Advisory Committee, MECC (Multicultural Education Coordinating Committee, later just MEC, without the Coordinating). Its structure was unique, having relevant and interested personnel from the three education sectors in South Australia (public, Catholic and independent) appointed as members by the Minister, alongside an equal number of people chosen for their leadership roles in a range of ethnic communities. It provided a forum for genuine and frank interchange about the most effective ways of responding to the cultural and linguistic diversity to be found in South Australian schools. Its members met monthly and reported directly to the Minister of Education. They also organised a number of school based projects for teachers, students and parents around such issues as multicultural perspectives in the curriculum, languages education, parent-school partnerships, countering racism and human rights education.

== CISME ==
A second important forum which Smolicz used for sharing his research and theory was CISME, the Centre for Intercultural Studies and Multicultural Education, which he established within the University of Adelaide in 1989. Over the next fifteen years he organized over 200 CISME seminars on intercultural and multicultural issues, half of which were addressed by international academics and visitors. The CISME members and others who attended the seminars included government, business and community leaders. Teachers and students from schools across all education sectors, as well as the universities, benefited especially from those seminars which related to languages education in various settings. CISME was closed down in 2006.

== Posthumous awards ==
The Smolicz Award was honored posthumously under his name which are offered every year to Australian citizens or others who have permanent residency status - enrolled in a university language teaching course. The languages supported for study include Aboriginal languages, Chinese, French, German, Italian, Indonesian, Japanese, Modern Greek, Spanish and Vietnamese.
