= Neville Alexander =

South African activist (1936–2012)

Neville Edward Alexander
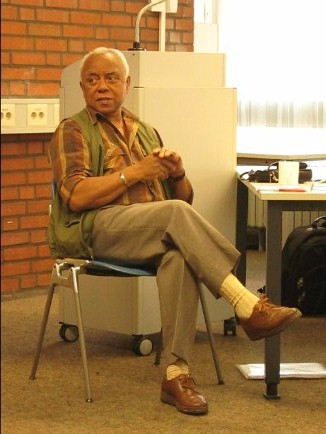
- Alexander at the World Conference of African Linguistics in Cologne in September 2009
- Born: 22 October 1936; Cradock, South Africa
- Died: 27 August 2012 (aged 75)
- Education: University of Cape Town BA & MA, PhD (University of Tübingen)
- Occupations: Political activist, educationalist & academic: lecturer at various institutes and universities
- Known for: Jailmate of Nelson Mandela and Linguapax winner

Neville Edward Alexander OLS (22 October 1936 – 27 August 2012) was a proponent of a multilingual South Africa and a former revolutionary who spent ten years on Robben Island as a fellow prisoner of Nelson Mandela.

== Early life ==
Alexander was born in Cradock, Eastern Cape, South Africa to David James Alexander, a carpenter, and Dimbiti Bisho Alexander, a schoolteacher. His maternal grandmother, Bisho Jarsa was an Ethiopian from ethnic Oromo, rescued from slavery by the British.

He was educated at Holy Rosary Convent, Cradock, and matriculated in 1952. He spent six years at the University of Cape Town. He obtained a BA in German and History in 1955 and his Honours in German a year later. He completed an MA in German in 1957. His thesis was on the Silesia Baroque drama of Andreas Gryphius and Daniel Caspar von Lohenstein. Having been awarded an Alexander von Humboldt Foundation fellowship place at the University of Tübingen he gained his PhD in 1961 for a dissertation on style change in the dramatic work of Gerhart Hauptmann.

== The Apartheid years ==
=== Marxist activism ===
By 1957, Alexander was a member of the Cape Peninsula Students' Union, an affiliate of The Non-European Unity Movement of South Africa. He joined the African Peoples Democratic Union of Southern Africa (APDUSA) which was established in 1960. However he was ejected from APDUSA in 1961 and with Dulcie September, Ottilie Abrahams, and Andreas Shipinga, among others, formed a study group of nine members in July 1962, known as the Yu Chi Chan Club (YCCC); Yu Chi Chan is the Chinese name for guerrilla warfare, which Mao Zedong used. The YCCC disbanded in late 1962 and was replaced by the National Liberation Front (NLF), which Alexander co-founded. In July 1963, he, along with most members of the NLF, was arrested. In 1964, he was convicted of conspiracy to commit sabotage. From 1964–1974 he was imprisoned on Robben Island.

=== Imprisonment on Robben Island ===
Between 1964 and 1974, Neville Alexander was imprisoned on Robben Island, where he shared his captivity with Nelson Mandela, Walter Sisulu and Mac Maharaj, amongst others. Despite the conditions of their imprisonment, the prisoners organised a vibrant intellectual life, often referred to as the "Robben Island University". Neville Alexander taught history there, took part in informal seminars and encouraged the study of African languages as well as critical reflection on South African history. He later regarded this experience as a defining moment in his intellectual development, having taught him the principles of democratic dialogue and cooperation between activists from different political backgrounds.

=== Activities following his release ===
Released in 1974, Alexander was subject to a five-year ban on political activity and placed under house arrest. During this period, he engaged in an undercover dialogue with the Black Consciousness Movement. He wrote One Azania, One Nation, published in 1979 under the pseudonym "No Sizwe", as the book was banned in South Africa. In this work, he continued his reflections on anti-colonialism and socialism, whilst also attempting to propose a definition of the nation that ran counter to that put forward by the white supremacists of apartheid.

From the late 1970s onwards, he resumed his academic career at the University of Cape Town, where he taught sociology. He was involved in several organisations working to promote democratic education, notably the South African Committee for Higher Education. He also played an important role in the National Languages Project, which promotes African languages in education and public life.

== Post-Apartheid ==
After being released Alexander did pioneering work in the field of language policy and planning in South Africa from the early 1980s via organisations such as The Project for the Study of Alternative Education in South Africa (PRAESA), as well as the LANGTAG process. He was influential in respect to language policy development with various government departments, including Education.

His most recent work was focused on the tension between multilingualism and the hegemony of English in the public sphere. He founded and was director of PRAESA from 1992 until the end of 2011 and a member of the Interim Governing Board of the African Academy of Languages. In 1981, he was appointed Director of the South African Committee for Higher Education (SACHED). At the time of his death, he had retired from being director of PRAESA at the University of Cape Town. In 1994, his Trotskyist Workers Organisation for Socialist Action contested the elections.

Alexander received the Linguapax Prize for 2008. The prize is awarded annually (since 2000) in recognition of contributions to linguistic diversity and multilingual education. The citation noted that he had devoted more than twenty years of his professional life to defend and preserve multilingualism in the post-apartheid South Africa and had become one of the major advocates of linguistic diversity.

== Death ==
Alexander died from cancer following a short period of ill-health on 27 August 2012, aged 75. His personal archive was donated to the University of Cape Town's Special Collections library. In 2014, the Neville Alexander Papers were included in the library's Manuscripts and Archives collections. The university has also named a building on its lower campus after him.
