= The Project for the Study of Alternative Education in South Africa =

Literacy research program in South Africa

The Project for the Study of Alternative Education in South Africa (PRAESA)
- Founded: 1992
- Founders: Neville Alexander
- Type: Nonprofit organization
- Purpose: Education, Literacy
- Location: 3 Marlow Road, Kenilworth, Cape Town, 7708, South Africa
- Region served: South Africa
- Website: www.praesa.org.za

The Project for the Study of Alternative Education in South Africa (PRAESA) is a multilingual, early literacy research and development organisation, affiliated with the University of Cape Town. PRAESA's work in literacy approaches, curricula, training, materials development and research has meaning making, stories and imagination as its compass point. PRAESA's aim is to ensure all young children from diverse language, class and cultural backgrounds have appropriate opportunities to become imaginative and critical readers and writers.

== History ==
PRAESA was founded in 1992 by Dr Neville Alexander – a public intellectual, historian and educationist who spent 10 years on Robben Island (1964–1974) during the struggle against apartheid. By invitation from the University of Cape Town, PRAESA was housed in the Faculty of Humanities.

After South Africa's first democratic election in 1994, PRAESA organised the country's first national conference on primary school curriculum initiatives to bring together non-governmental organisations with government out of which a series of proposals was made to government on ways to transform the curriculum. The key idea was to promote unity, with a strong emphasis on multilingual education using African languages as well as English.

In 1995, Neville Alexander led a task group (LANGTAG) to develop a national language plan. Among its goals were that all South Africans should have access to all spheres of society through the development and maintenance of a level of spoken and written language appropriate for a range of contexts in all official languages; and that equitable and widespread language facilitation services should be established. The plan was presented to the Minister of Arts, Culture, Science and Technology in 1996.

== Projects and partner organisations ==
Carole Bloch set up and ran PRAESA's Early Literacy Unit in 1998. She initiated a six-year interactive Xhosa-English writing process with colleague, Ntombizanele Mahobe (née Nkence) and children and staff at Battswood Primary School in Cape Town. This development research project created a model for simultaneous early biliteracy teaching and learning, based on stories and meaning making that could be adapted by others.

In 2005, PRAESA responded to a request for educational support for young people in Langa and had the opportunity to focus its passion for reading and multilingualism on setting up community-based reading clubs. In particular, the Vulindlela Reading Club in Langa has become a model for other reading clubs in the Western Cape and beyond.

In 2007, Carole Bloch formed The Little Hands Trust, together with fellow trustees and PRAESA members Neville Alexander, Ntombizanele Mahobe, Xolisa Guzula and Arabella Koopman, to motivate and nurture reading and writing among African children and their care-givers.

In 2011, Carole Bloch was approached by the DG Murray Trust to design a literacy campaign. This became Nal’ibali (“Here’s the story” in isiXhosa) in 2012, when she became director of PRAESA.

Carole Bloch led Nal’ibali until the end of 2015. In 2016, Nal’ibali became an independent trust, The Nal’ibali Trust.

PRAESA is involved in advocacy and consultancy work with regards to transforming and Africanising the early childhood curriculum, multilingual education, reading culture and materials development, and early literacy and biliteracy teaching and learning.

The organisation offers hands-on training as well as consultancy work in early childhood development literacy, multilingual materials development, and curriculum development.

Executive director Carole Bloch serves on the Minister of Education's Reading Advisory Committee, the IBBY South Africa executive committee, IBBY International Executive Committee and as a member of the Reading Hall of Fame.

== Awards ==
2014: IBBY-Asahi Reading Promotion Award. Initiated by the International Board on Books for Young People and sponsored by Japanese newspaper company the Asahi Shimbun, the award is presented biennially to two groups or institutions whose activities promote reading among children and young people.

2015: Astrid Lindgren Memorial Award, awarded to individuals or institutions for their long-term commitment to growing a love of reading in children.

== Selected publications ==
- Neville Alexander, Racial Identity, Citizenship and Nation Building in Post Apartheid South Africa
- Peter Plüddemann, Home-Language Based Bilingual Education: Towards a Learner-Centred Language Typology of Primary Schools in South Africa
- Brigitta Busch, Aziza Jardine and Angelika Tjoutuku, Language biographies for multilingual learning
- Rima Vesely, Multilingual Environments for Survival: The Impact of English on Xhosa-Speaking Students in Cape Town
- Neville Alexander, English Unassailable but Unattainable: The Dilemma of Language Policy in South African Education
- Carole Bloch, Literacy in the Early Years: Teaching and Learning in Multilingual Early Childhood Classrooms
