= Mmuock language =

Southern Bantoid language of Cameroon

Mmuock
- Mmock
- Region: Cameroon
- Ethnicity: Bamileke
- Language family: Niger–Congo?: Atlantic–Congo; Volta-Congo; Benue–Congo; Bantoid; Southern Bantoid; Grassfields; Eastern Grassfields; Mbam-Nkam; Bamileke; West Bamileke; Bamboutos; Yemba; Mmuock

Language codes
- ISO 639-3: –
- Glottolog: mmok1234

Mmuock, alternatively Mmock, is the language of the Mmuock (Mmock) people of western Cameroon. A writing system is based on the Latin script.

Mmuock is a tonal language: the phrase a la u la can mean at least 10 different things depending on the tone on the ⟨a⟩ and the ⟨u⟩:

1. A la u lā. Cry if she cries. (a: she, lèlā: to cry, u: you)
2. A la u là. Cook it if she cries. (lèlá: to cook)
3. A lâ u lā. Cry if she cooks it.
4. A lâ u là. Cook it if she cooks it.
5. A la̋ u lā. She has cooked it and you have cried.
6. A la̋ u là. She has cooked it and you have cooked.
7. A lă u là. (a habitual aspect) She cries and you cook it.
8. A lă u lā. (a habitual aspect) She cries and you cry.
9. A lã ù lá. You will cry when she will cry (near future).
10. A lã ù là. You will cook it when she will cry (near future).
11. Ă là ù là. You will cook when she will cook it (near future).
12. Ă là ù lá. You will cry when she will cook it (near future).

== Orthography ==
The Mmuock alphabet referenced herein has notations for fifteen tones and forty letters.

A Mmuock alphabet: the letters
a /a/	b /b/	c /t͡ʃ/	d /d/	ǳ /d͡z/	e /ǝ/	f /f/	g /ɡ/	h /ʔ/, /h/	i /i/
j /ǰ/	k /k/	l /l/	m /m/	n /n/	ñ /ɲ/	ng /ŋ/	æ /ɛ/	ir /ɪ/	r /ɐ/
er /ɘ/	ø /ɯ/	š /ʃ/	o /ɔ/	œ /ɨ/	p /p/	pf /p͡f/	ow /o/	q /ɣ/	ur /ɜ/
ar /e/	s /s/	t /t/	ts /t͡s/	u /u/	v /v/	w /w/	x /ʒ/	y /j/	z /z/

=== Keyboard layouts ===
Some Unix-like operating systems such as Linux provide an XKB keyboard layout for the Mmuock alphabet. The keyboard layout is a variant of the layout for Cameroon English.

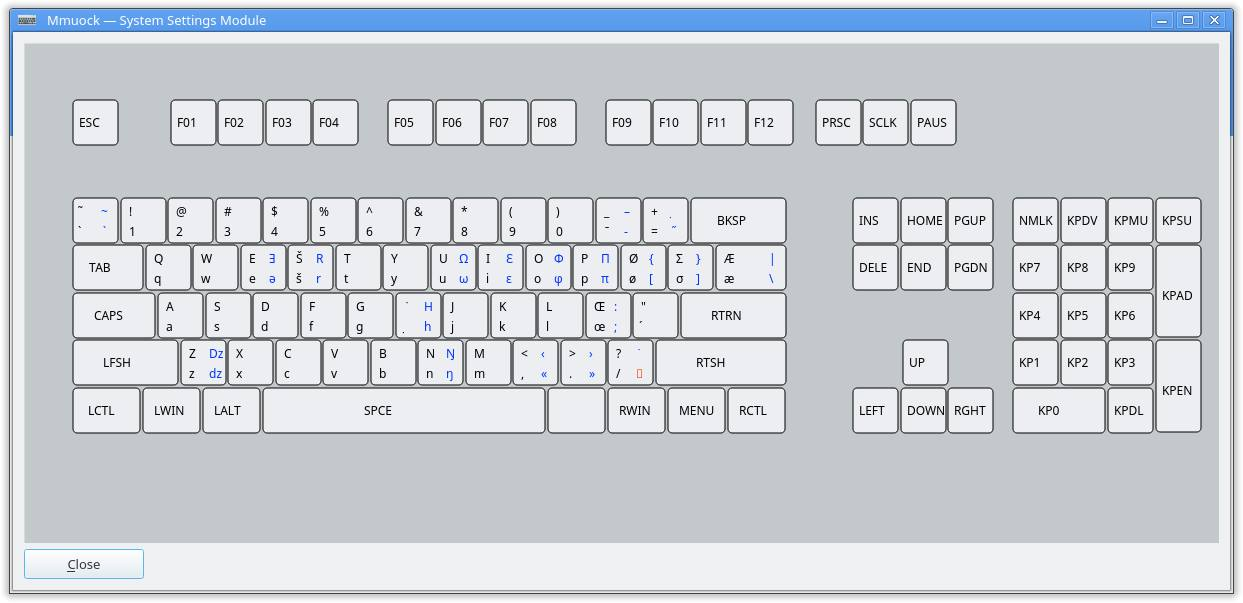
Mmuock keyboard layout under KDE running on Ubuntu 17.04

Under Microsoft Windows, Android, the iPhone and iPad, a keyboard layout is available that uses Keyman keyboard layouts.

== Sample phrases ==
Welcome
Zàlèsǣh (to one person)
Peì zàlèsǣh (to more than one person)
Enjoy your stay
Zàlènáng (to one person)
Peì zàlènáng (to more than one person)
How do you do?
À la ká? (to a non-elder)
What’s up? (casual)
Ǹgálé?

Bon appetit / Have a nice meal
À tsá Ńtsēr
Bon voyage / Have a good journey
Qei lènda (to one person)
Peì qéí lènda (to more than one person)
Thank you
M nkongtè wúó (to one person)
M nkongtè wéí (to more than one person)
Thanks!
M nkongte̋
