= Yemba language =

Grassfields language spoken in Cameroon

Yemba
- Ashuŋne yémba
- Dschang
- Region: Cameroon
- Ethnicity: Bamileke
- Native speakers: ~500,000 (2023)
- Language family: Niger–Congo?: Atlantic–Congo; Volta-Congo; Benue–Congo; Bantoid; Southern Bantoid; Grassfields; Eastern Grassfields; Mbam-Nkam; Bamileke; West Bamileke; Bamboutos; Yemba
- Dialects: various, including Foreke Dschang and Mmuock

Language codes
- ISO 639-3: ybb
- Glottolog: yemb1246

Yɛmba or Yemba, also Yémba or Bamiléké Dschang, is a major Bamileke language in West Region of Cameroon. It was approximately spoken by 500,000 or so people in the country in 2023.

Despite originally being exclusively a spoken language, Yemba writing was developed by Maurice Tadadjeu (co-creator of the General Alphabet of Cameroon Languages) and Steven Bird. Their team developed a small Yemba–French Dictionary covering French translations of over 3,000 Yemba words and expressions. The Mmuock dialect also has a proposed orthography.

== Phonology ==
=== Consonants ===
		Labial	Alveolar	Palatal	Velar	Glottal
Plosive	voiceless	(p)	t		k	ʔ
Plosive	voiced	b	d		ɡ	
Affricate		p͡f	t͡s	t͡ʃ		
Fricative	voiceless	f	s	ʃ		
Fricative	voiced	v	z	ʒ	(ɣ)	
Nasal		m	n		ŋ	
Rhotic			(r)			
Approximant	lateral		(l)			
Approximant	central	w		j		

- Sounds /t͡ʃ ʃ ʒ/ are included as phonemes in some analyses. In most analyses, they are considered as allophones of /t͡s s z/.
- Sounds [p l ɣ] are consonant alternation sounds between the following consonants /b d ɡ/.
- Alternation sounds of /j w/ are labialized and palatalized sounds [ɡʲ ɡʷ].
- Graphemes of the alterations and allophones [t͡ʃ ʃ ʒ p l] are noted in the Yemba alphabet as c sh j p l.
- An /r/ sound can also be included in the current language, and written in the Yemba alphabet as r.
- The prosodies of palatalization and labialization [ʲ ʷ], are written orthographically with lowercase graphemes y w.
- A grapheme for aspiration [ʰ] among consonants is written as h.

=== Vowels ===
	Front	Central	Back
High	i	ʉ	u
Mid	e		o
Mid	ɛ		ɔ
Low		a	

- /ʉ/ is included as a phoneme in some analyses. In more abstract analyses, it is considered as a palatalization of /u/.
- Vowel length is distinguished using double vowel sounds (ex. aa [aː])

=== Tone ===
Three tones are marked as high [á], mid [ā], or low [à]. Low tones are unmarked when written.
