= Maurice Tadadjeu =

Cameroonian academic (1950–2012)

Maurice Tadadjeu (1950-2012 in Cameroon) was a vice-president of the African Union's Economic, Social and Cultural Council of Central Africa.

He was a co-creator of the General Alphabet of Cameroon Languages in the late 1970s.

In 1996 he became Founding Director of NACALCO Center for Applied Linguistics in Yaoundé, Cameroon. From 1993 to 1997 Prof. Tadadjeu was Head of the Department of African Languages and Linguistics at the University of Yaoundé. He was also Professor of Linguistics at the University of Yaoundé.

Prof. Tadadjeu was a founding member of the African Academy of Languages.

He died on December 30, 2012.

== Selected works ==
- Démocratie de Partage du Pouvoir : Pour le Modèle P3 au Cameroun [Academic Literature, ANACLAC/NACALCO, 1997]
- Confédération des Etats Unis d'Afrique [Academic Literature, Editions BUMA KOR, 1996]
- Training manual for the teaching of national languages in primary schools [Reference book, Collection PROPELCA, 1991]
- Le defi de Babel au Cameroun [Academic Literature, Collection PROPELCA, 1990] (Co-authored with Elisabeth Gfeller and Gabriel Mba)

== Achievements ==
In 2005 Prof. Tadadjeu was awarded the Linguapax Prize.
