= Bafou =

Coordinates: 5°28′N 10°07′E

Bafou, Cameroon
- Commune and town
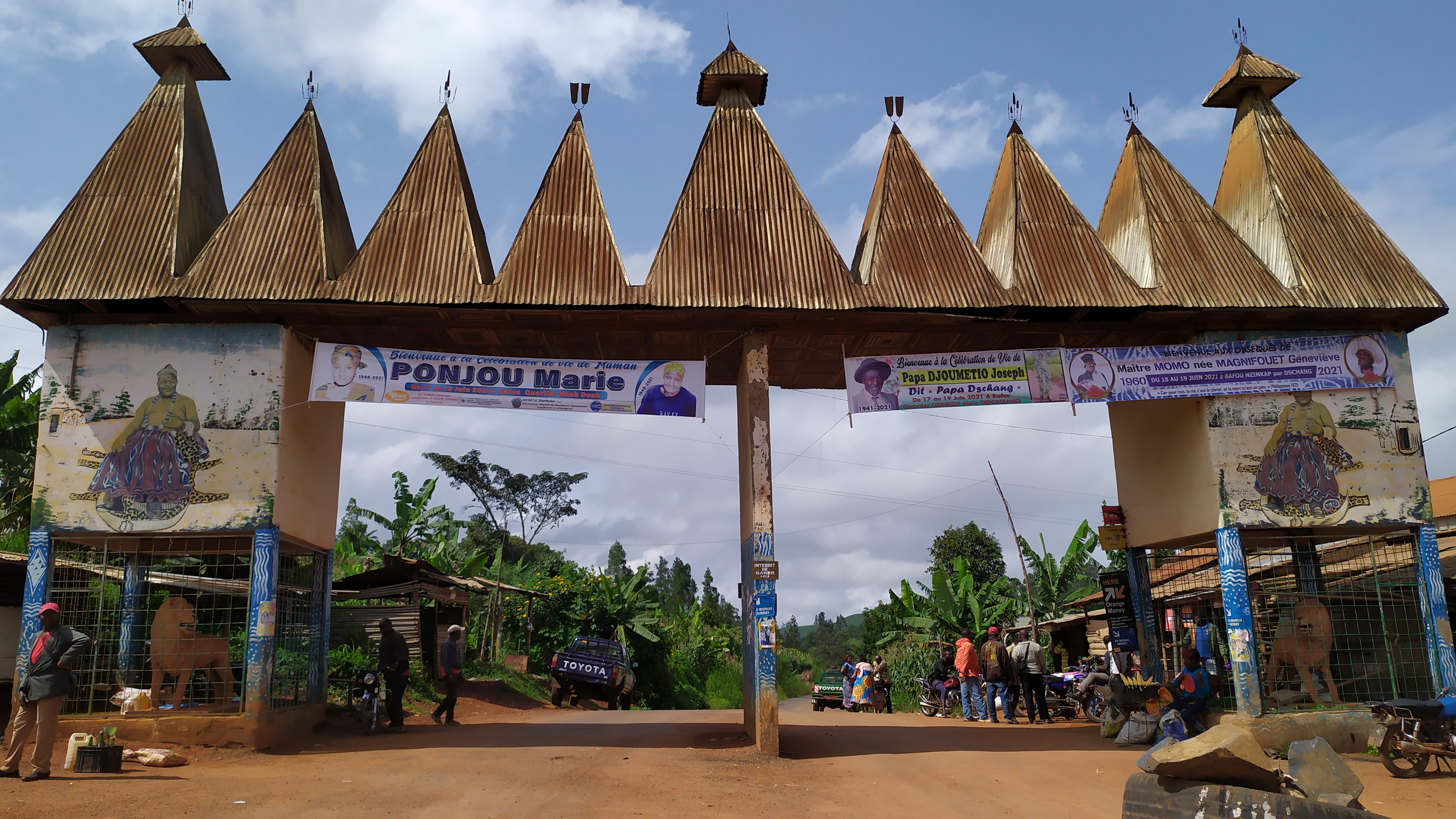
- Entrance of the Bafou Chiefdom
- Interactive map of Bafou, Cameroon
- Country: Cameroon
- Time zone: UTC+1 (WAT)

Bafou is a small municipality situated in the west of Cameroon, in the West region, Menoua division and Nkongni subdivision. Bafou is populated by the Bamileke people, situated at approximately 10 km from Dschang the closest city. The rural economy is sustain by agriculture, except some few government worker civil servant, the large part of the population depends on agriculture.

== See also ==
- Communes of Cameroon
