= Timeline of the Anglophone Crisis (2022) =

Conflict, started 2017, in Cameroon

This is a timeline of the Anglophone Crisis in Cameroon during 2022.

The Anglophone Crisis is an ongoing armed conflict in the Republic of Cameroon in Central Africa, where historically English-speaking Ambazonian separatists are seeking the independence of the former British trust territory of Southern Cameroons, which was unified with Cameroon since 1961.

== January ==
- On 3 January, separatists detonated an improvised explosive device (IED) in the town of Limbe, Southwest Region, which was set to host matches of the delayed 2021 Africa Cup of Nations (AFCON). Separatist fighters who had vowed to disrupt 2021 Africa Cup of Nations in the city said on social media they were responsible for the blast and stated that it was "a warning sign of what they will do during AFCON".
- The delayed AFCON is scheduled to be held in Limbe and Buea starting on 9 January. Cameroon has deployed additional troops to the cities, while separatists have warned the Confederation of African Football against holding the tournament.
- On 8 January, Cameroonian army soldiers on patrol in a military vehicle were ambushed in Bafut. The government forces left from Santa and were surprised by separatist fighters hiding in the forest. Several soldiers were wounded, according to an initial report.
- On 11 January, SDF senator Henry Kemende was killed in Bamenda. No one claimed responsibility.
- On 12 January, The Mali national football team suspended training before the AFCON game against Tunisia following clashes between separatists and the Cameroon Armed Forces in Buea, killing two. Three police officers were also injured by a homemade bomb. In a separate incident near Buea, a Cameroonian soldier was killed in a separatist IED ambush; the Ambazonia Defence Forces (ADF) claimed responsibility. The Tunisian Football Federation decided to cancel the post-game recovery session of the Tunisia national football team due to "terrorist threats".
- On 15 January, armed separatists abducted eight plantation workers in Tiko, accusing them of collaborating with the Cameroonian military. The plantation workers were released nine days later; according to the separatists, the workers had sworn not to collaborate with the Cameroonian military in the future.
- On 18 January, at least one Cameroonian soldier was killed, several more were injured and two vehicles were destroyed in a separatist IED ambush between Buea and Muyuka.
- On 19 January, armed men abducted five teachers in the village of Weh in Menchum, Northwest Region.
- On 20 January, the Cameroonian military killed separatist commander "General Ebube" and two of his lieutenants in Nseh in the Bui division.
- On 21 January, there were clashes between separatist fighters and the Cameroonian Army in Babessi.
- On 22 January, separatist fighters invaded a burial and killed four mourners in the village of Finge, Northwest Region.
- On 24 January, a shootout broke out between separatist fighters and the Cameroonian Army in Bui.
- On 25 January, a Cameroonian soldier was shot dead and beheaded during a separatist raid in Bamenyam, West Region. Several other soldiers were reportedly wounded. The ADF claimed responsibility.
- On 28 January, a Cameroonian police officer was shot dead by separatist fighters in Bamenda. The ADF claimed responsibility. In Bambalang, Northwest Region, four separatists were killed and their arms were seized by the Cameroonian Army.
- On 31 January, a separatist militia known as the "Bui Warriors" battled Cameroonian forces in Bamkikai, Kumbo, until the Cameroonian Army withdrew from the area. At least three Cameroonian soldiers were reportedly killed, and one military vehicle was destroyed.

== February ==
- On 1 February, separatist fighters attacked and burned down a military base in Bali Nyonga, Mezam. Separatists restricted circulation on the Bamenda-Mbengwi road.
- On 2 February, President Samuel Ikome Sako was impeached by the legislative arm of the Interim Government faction loyal to him, complicating the long-running Ambazonian leadership crisis.
- On 6 February, the Cameroonian military killed two persons at a funeral in Bamukumbit, Northwest Region.
- On 7 February, a Cameroonian soldier was shot dead by separatist fighters in Kumba.
- On 8 February, suspected separatists set ablaze a classroom in a primary school in Buea.
- On 11 February, armed men referring to themselves as ARF (Ambazonia Restoration Forces) set several dormitories of Queen of the Rosary College in Mamfe on fire.
- On 14 February, a Cameroonian soldier died after his leg was cut off by a separatist IED ambush in Sabga, Northwest Region.
- On 16 February, it was reported that clashes between the ADF and the ARF (now led by Lekeaka Oliver, leader of the Red Dragon militia) had led to several separatist deaths. The clashes took place in six different towns, with the fighting in Kumbo being described as particularly bloody.
- On 21 February, a Cameroonian soldier was killed in a separatist IED ambush in the Northwest Region.
- On 25 February, the ADF abducted ten teachers from a school for disabled children in Ngomham, Bamenda. A separatist general was killed by the Cameroonian army in Kumba, Southwest Region.
- On 26 February, suspected separatist fighters opened fire on a vehicle in Bamenda killing a nurse and wounding a doctor.

== March ==
- On 2 March, seven people including a Divisional Officer, and a mayor were killed in a separatist IED ambush in Ekondo-Titi, Southwest Region. The ADF claimed responsibility.
- On 9 March, armed Fulani killed Kum Achou Albert, the traditional ruler of Esu in Menchum together with his wife, after accusing him of failing to stop Esu youth from joining Ambazonian separatists. Esu youths subsequently burned down dozens of Fulani houses and farms, as well as a mosque. Six people were injured during the attacks. Cameroon deployed forces to Esu the next day to prevent further clashes, and several people were arrested.
- On 11 March, the Cameroonian military said it had arrested "several" separatists in Northwest Region who were planning to attack many gendarmerie brigades.
- On 13 March, ADF fighters were hosted by the Biafra Nations League (BNL) at one of their bases in the Bakassi peninsula. The two groups reportedly discussed joint operations from the peninsula and into Ndian Division.
- On 17 March, gunmen believed to be separatist fighters killed a man impersonating a fighter in Bamenda.
- By 18 March, following a Cameroonian government offensive in Kumbo, Ndop, Wum, Bafut and Kom, hundreds of separatist fighters had withdrawn to villages along the Nigerian border. The Cameroonian military claimed to have killed 20 separatists during the offensive, and deployed additional troops to border villages. The separatists said they had made a tactical withdrawal, and denied losing 20 fighters.
- On 27 March, a notorious Ambazonian general was beaten to death by an angry mob in Ngie, Momo Division, Northwest Region.
- On 28 March, suspected separatist fighters stormed a village in Wabane, Lebialem division, Southwest Region, killing a teacher and abducted five other persons.
- On 29 March, a gun battle between the Cameroon military and separatist fighters broke out in Bachongwa, Northwest Region following an explosion on a bridge as a military convoy used the road. In Mbongong, Ndu, separatists killed three ethnic Fulanis whom they accused of working for the Cameroonian government. Cameroonian government troops and Fulani militants retaliated by burning down houses, resulting in the death of at least one civilian.
- On 30 March, a Cameroonian soldier was killed in a separatist IED ambush in Mbonge, Southwest Region.
- On 31 March, several houses were set ablaze by separatists in Bamunka, Ndop, Northwest Region.

== April ==
- On 5 April, separatists attacked the University of Bamenda for defying a ghost town operation. In Manyu, at least seven Cameroonian soldiers were killed and another seven were wounded in a separatist attack on four military checkpoints.
- On 6 April, separatists abducted alleged anti-separatists protesters in Oku, Northwest Region. Separatists set ablaze an unspecified number of houses who reportedly belongs to the Mbororos people in Ndu, Northwest Region. 33 seminarians were kidnapped for ransom by separatists in Manyu, Mamfe, Southwest Region then released 24 hours after their kidnapping. Four Cameroonian soldiers were killed and another six were wounded in a separatist IED ambush in Mamfe.
- On 7 April, three separatists who attempted to disrupt a football match, were killed by the population of Mbalangi, Mbonge, Southwest Region. Separatists opened fire on a public transport on the Mbengwi-Bamenda road in Momo Division, Northwest Region killing the driver and wounding a girl.
- On 8 April, a 60-year-old woman who is reported to have taken part in an anti-separatists protest in Oku, Bui Division, Northwest Region was killed by separatists. A separatist commander known as "General Insobu" was shot dead in Kumbo by a rival force called Bui Unity Warriors controlled by "General No Pity". Cameroonian authorities said that separatists had attacked a village on the Nigerian border earlier in the week, with local officials saying they torched at least 12 homes and killed six members of the Mbororo ethnic group.
- On 12 April, The North West regional delegate of Penitentiary Administration and four prison wardens were killed in a separatist IED ambush in Kumbo, Northwest Region. The Bui Unity Warriors claimed responsibility.
- On 13 April, two separatists were killed in Kembong, Manyu.
- On 17 April, two civilians were killed following clashes between soldiers and separatists in Bamenda.
- On 19 April, armed separatists killed five people in Akwaya, Manyu, two of whom were children.
- On 21 April, the Cameroon military killed three people in a military raid in Bali, Northwest Region.
- On 22 April, two soldiers were killed by separatists along the Mamfe-Ekok stretch.
- On 25 April, the Cameroonian Army said it had killed six separatist fighters in Batibo, as well as one civilian who got caught in the crossfire. Several arrests were carried out.
- By 25 April, about 90 percent of cross-border trade in the Anglophone regions had been brought to a halt, as Ambazonian forces and the Eastern Security Network expanded their control on both sides of the Nigerian border.
- On 26 April, Cameroon arrested more than 40 people in Oku, 24 of whom were later accused with working with separatists.
- On 27 April, a separatist general known as "General Try and See" and five of his fighters were killed by the Cameroonian Army in Ndu.
- On 28 April, the Cameroonian military said it had carried out raids in Batibo, Bafut, Gusang, Ndu, Kumbo and Wum in the past week, and that more than 40 separatists (including three generals) had been killed. The Cameroonian military claimed to have suffered no fatalities; this was disputed by the ADF. The ADF also said that some of its fighters had been captured and summarily executed. A video emerged where civilians in Guzang buried seven separatists and one civilian in a mass grave; the Cameroonian military confirmed its authenticity.
- On 30 April, the ADF abducted Senator Regina Mundi of CPDM and her driver in Bamenda and asked Paul Biya to release 75 Ambazonian prisoners.

== May ==
- On 1 May, unknown gunmen kidnapped a lawyer in Bamenda.
- On 4 May, the Cameroonian Army killed a separatist fighter and his alleged girlfriend in Mbengwi. The Cameroonian Army killed a woman and her cousin over alleged links with separatists in the same town.
- On 7 May 10 construction workers were abducted by alleged separatists in Ekombe, Southwest Region.
- On 8 May, the Cameroonian Army killed three people including two separatists in Bamenda.
- On 9 May, two Cameroonian soldiers were killed in a separatist IED ambush in Lebialem while two others were killed in Jakiri.
- On 10 May, two Cameroonian gendarmes were killed by alleged separatists in Fonfuka.
- On 15 May, two Manyu-based Ambazonian generals announced a blockade of the Mamfe-Ekok road.
- On 16 May, separatists stormed Mbalangi and tortured civilians for siding with the Cameroonian military. Clashes broke out in Bamenda and lasted for at least three days.
- On 17 May, at least 19 workers at a state-owned plantation were abducted in Idenau by separatists.
- On 18 May, separatists stormed a market in Donga-Mantung and shot dead one person and injuring another.
- On 19 May, the Cameroon Army killed a separatist commander known as "Lion Dor" and his girlfriend in Oku.
- On 20 May, multiple clashes between the Cameroon Army and separatists took place in the English-speaking regions of Cameroon during the National Day. The Cameroonian Army claimed at least 28 separatists were killed during the battles, while the ADF claimed that 24 Cameroonian soldiers were killed.
- On 21 May, suspected armed Fulani killed a civilian and injured his daughter in Mangi.
- On 22 May, the Cameroonian Army said it had repelled a separatist ambush at Otou and that it had killed at least four separatists. Cameroon said that two soldiers were wounded in the incident.
- On 24 May, the Bui Warriors ambushed Cameroonian troops with an IED close to the Tobin gendarmerie brigade. Clashes ensued, and the separatists claimed to have killed many Cameroonian soldiers. Later in the day, an unexploded grenade left over from the fighting detonated in a school around Kumbo, killing one pupil and injuring two others. In Yelim, close to Kumbo, the Bui Unity Warriors ambushed a military convoy with an IED, causing an unknown number of casualties. Earlier in the day, a Bui Unity Warriors officer known as "Commander Moon Tiger" had died fighting the Cameroonian Army.
- On 26 May, a BBC correspondent was kidnapped by gunmen in Bamenda.
- On 28 May, the Cameroonian Army said it had killed three separatist fighters in a village called Afab, including a commander.
- On 29 May, separatist forces invaded the villages of Obonyi and Kajifu in Akwaya, near the Nigerian border, reportedly with the aim of abducting selected individuals. Clashes ensued, and many villagers fled across the border into the villages of Bashu and Danare in Boki, Cross River State. The separatists pursued them into Nigerian territory and killed at least 20 people, injured another 70, and burned down dozens of houses. The invasion was condemned by the Biafra Nations League (BNL), a Biafran separatist group with otherwise friendly relations with the Ambazonian movement. The BNL threatened to respond unless Ambazonian leaders condemned the invasion. In Batibo, Cameroonian Army freed several hostages held by the ADF, including Senator Regina Mundi who had been held since 30 April. The army said that it had killed ten separatists and captured three. The ADF denied suffering any casualties, and said that the fighters had released the hostages in order to escape in time. The ADF also alleged that the Cameroonian Army had abused civilians during their search for the senator. In Kumbo, Cameroonian soldiers killed five people.

== June ==
- On 1 June, Cameroonian army elements killed nine civilians in the locality of Missong, Menchum, including an 18-month-old girl. The soldiers were arrested by the authorities a few days later.
- On 4 June, former separatist general "Nambere" (who had taken an amnesty offer in 2020, and had since encouraged his fighters to follow his example) threatened to rejoin the Ambazonian struggle and to "spoil 30 armoured cars", unless the Cameroonian government gave him a foreign passport and money to start a new life.
- On 7 June, between five and nine Cameroonian gendarmes were killed and another three were wounded in a separatist attack on a checkpoint in Njitapon, Kouoptamo, West Region. The attack was led by General No Pity. More than a hundred fighters participated in the attack, and they arrived in flying boats with the engines shut off in order not to make noise. The separatists then blew up the checkpoint with grenades, and used a rocket launcher to destroy army vehicles. Cameroonian Army reinforcements failed to arrive before the separatists had already withdrawn back across the river.
- On 8 June, two separatist fighters were killed by the BIR in Kumba, including an officer known as "General Deco". Their remains were put on public display by the BIR.
- On 9 June, following a gun battle, suspected separatists burnt down an hospital in Mamfe.
- On 10 June, a Cameroonian gendarme was killed by separatists in Mbanga, Littoral Region.
- On 11 June, a Cameroonian gendarme was killed and beheaded by separatists in Bamenda, and another one was wounded. One civilian was also killed in the crossfire. An armed group known as the "Wounded Lions" claimed responsibility.
- On 12 June, three separatist fighters were killed in Bamali, Ndop, including an officer known as "General Transporter".
- On 14 June, a Cameroonian gendarme and soldier were killed by separatists in the Northwest Region.
- On 16 June, suspected Fulani militants killed two people in Ndu. In Bamenda, a Cameroonian gendarme was injured in a separatist attack and left to die by his attackers; he was later rescued by locals.
- On 17 June, two Cameroonian soldiers were injured while attempting to disarm an IED near Mbingo, Boyo. In Kumbo, two teachers were kidnapped by suspected separatists.
- On 19 June, two children were seriously injured after playing with a grenade left behind from the Njitapon separatist attack twelve days prior.
- On 21 June, a separatist fighter was killed during clashes with Cameroonian forces in Esu. A civilian was also injured.
- On 24 June, SOCADEF attacked the Konye Gendarmerie Brigade, killing one Cameroonian officer. In the village of Mesaka in Akwaya, at least 26 villagers and six Nigerian citizens were massacred by armed men from the neighboring village of Oliti. Villagers in Mesaka claimed that the armed men were separatist fighters who had been hired for pay; separatists denied any involvement.
- On 25–26 June, the BIR carried out into the villages of Banten, Mborshia, and Yere in Bui division, during which they amubushed an ADF hideout and killed between two and five fighters. The ADF claimed that two Cameroonian soldiers were also killed.
- On 28 June, ten separatists who attempted to attack a gendarmerie checkpoint in Babadjou, West Region were arrested and their weapons seized by the security forces, two gendarmes were wounded in the operation.

== July ==
- On 1 July, the Red Dragons raided Santchou, West Region and burned cars and houses. While no one was killed, a number was injured and many fled. Separatist fighters also destroyed a food truck in Nzindong, Bamboutos, also in West Region.
- On 7 July, separatists launched a manhunt for their own general Shiyntum Augustine, after he had abused civilians in Bui.
- On 8 July, a Cameroonian soldier was killed in a separatist attack on a brigade in Mbiame. General No Pity led the attack.
- On 12 July, Ambazonian Field Marshall Lekeaka Oliver, leader of the Red Dragons, was killed in Menji. Cameroonian forces were able to retrieve the body three days later. According to the Cameroonian government, Oliver and one of his guards had been killed in a Cameroonian raid. Separatists claimed that Oliver had been killed by an insider during separatist infighting; his assassin had revealed the location of the body to Cameroonian forces.
- On 16 July, two separatist fighters were killed by the Cameroonian Army in Bafut.
- On 18 July, Cameroonian soldiers tortured and then summarily executed three civilians in Batibo, and burned down houses.
- On 24 July, three ethnic Fulani were abducted and later found dead in Wum. The next day, armed Fulani carried out a revenge attack in Wum, resulting in at least ten people being injured.
- On 26 July, Cameroonian forces killed four civilians in Ikiliwindi. A BIR commander was killed by separatists in Kumba during a shootout.
- On 30 July, dozens of separatists and an unknown number of soldiers died during clashes in Batibo.
- On 31 July, Cameroonian forces initiated a three-day, multi-front attack on the ADF in the Batibo district. Two separatist fighters known as "Colonel John" and "General Rasta" including 15 other ADF fighters were killed by the Cameroonian forces in Bambui, and another 18 were said to have been captured. The Cameroonian Army said that eleven of its forces were injured during the operation, while the ADF claimed to have killed "at least two dozen" soldiers. Local eyewitnesses reported losses on both sides, as well as civilian deaths. The ADF confirmed the death of eleven of their men, and said that they had cancelled an offensive in Bamenda involving 300 fighters due to the losses. In Bwabwa, six civilians were abducted by separatists.

== August ==
- On 5 August, three people were killed (possibly summarily executed) by alleged Cameroonian soldiers in Bamenda.
- On 7 August, Bui Unity Warriors forces led by General No Pity attacked the Oku Gendarmerie Brigade, but were repulsed with three fighters dead.
- On 9 August, two soldiers were killed and one soldier was injured in a separatist attack led by General No Pity in Ndop. Multiple soldiers died during clashes with separatists in Ndop.
- On 10 August, the Commander of the Kumbo Gendarmerie Brigade was killed in his home by the Bui Unity Warriors in Kumbo. At least seven soldiers were killed by separatists at Bamboutos, West Region.
- On 12 August, separatists abducted four bar owners in Kumbo.
- On 13 August, separatists abducted an unspecified number of bar owners in Mbveh. A police inspector and a soldier were killed by separatists in Magba, Noun, West Region.
- On 15 August, the Wounded Lions set ablaze a vehicle in Buea for violating separatist-imposed Monday ghost town.
- On 22 August, suspected separatists stormed the PSS Mankon in the Northwest Region and burnt down the boy dormitory.
- On 27 August, two Cameroonian soldiers and a member of a local vigilante force were killed in Wat, Donga-Mantung.
- On 28 August, multiple separatist attacks occurred in at least three different localities across the Anglophone regions. Three soldiers were killed and many others injured in an IED ambush led by Seven Karta in Bafut. In Ngokuv, unknown casualties after the Bui Unity Warriors fired a rocket at an armored car. In Eyumodjock, a gendarmerie brigade was attacked by separatists; the gendarmes escaped before the attack occurred.

== September ==
- On 2 September, Cameroonian forces raided the villages of Kuvlu and Takov in Bui, breaking into houses and shooting indiscriminately. In one incident, a couple and their infant child were killed. In Nkum, shots were fired at a Catholic school.
- On 6 September, separatists opened fire on a bus that left from Douala killing six people and injuring eight others. Another bus was attacked in Yoke, but no one was injured.
- On 7 September, separatists burned a car in Mile 14, Buea, and attacked a bus stop in Mile 17. The separatists were enforcing a 10-day lockdown, and the clashes spelled an end to weeks of relative quiet in the city.
- On 8 September, Cameroonian soldiers killed at least two separatist fighters, including a commander known as "General Satan". At least four soldiers were killed in a separatist attack in Bamenda, the Butabu Kwifor and the Mankon Warrior claimed responsibility.
- On 9 September, Cameroonian forces shot dead a young man who refused to handover his phone to them in Buea. In Bamenda, a soldier was shot dead by separatists. Separatists fired a rocket at a military convoy killing two Cameroonian soldiers in Manyemen.
- On 10 September, long-term Interim Government of Ambazonia spokesperson Chris Anu (brother of deceased separatist general Lekeaka Oliver) declared himself President of Ambazonia. Consequently, the separatist movement found itself with four claimants for president. In Bamenda, Cameroonian forces invaded a vicinity and burnt down houses and shops to avenge the death of their colleagues killed two days ago by separatist fighters.
- On 11 September, six separatist fighters were killed during clashes with Cameroonian forces in Kumbo.
- On 14 September, the Bui Unity Warriors burnt down a military checkpoint in Jakiri; during the attack, Cameroonian soldiers escaped.
- On 16 September, gunmen suspected to be separatist fighters burnt down a church and took eight 9 people hostage, including 5 Catholic priests in Nchang, Mamfe.
- On 18 September, Cameroonian soldiers killed two women in Bali. The soldiers were later disarmed and arrested by the authorities.
- On 24 September, a Cameroonian military convoy was attacked by a separatist IED ambush in Bafut, Cameroonian forces retaliated by looting and destroying properties belonging to civilians. There were two instances of deadly inter-rebel clashes, in which two groups acted against another two groups that had abducted civilians.
- On 25 September, separatists attacked a Gendarmerie Brigade in Awing. Four staff of the Banso Baptist Hospital were abducted by separatists who suspect them of collaborating with Cameroonian forces.

== October ==
- On 1 October, separatist fighters held a public parade at an undisclosed location in Lebialem to mark the Ambazonian Independence Day.
- On 9 October, the Cameroonian Army said that at least six separatist fighters had been killed and another three captured in a raid on a separatist camp in Djotin.
- On 10 October, Cameroonian soldiers killed a man and his two sons in Mbonge.
- On 12 October, suspected separatist fighters killed an elderly person and burned down multiple houses belonging to the ethnic Fulanis in Wum.
- On 16 October, two Cameroonian gendarmes were killed by separatists in Donga-Mantung. Gunmen stormed and burned down the house of the mayor of Wum.
- On 19 October, the Cameroonian Army said it had killed a dozen separatists in an operation against the forces of General No Pity. The army also said that they had freed several hostages.
- On 22 October, at least six people were buried alive by local vigilantes in Esso Attah, Lebialem. The six were reportedly accused of assisting Red Dragon fighters in the killing of three local chiefs in February 2021.
- On 23 October, the nine people, including five priests, who had been taken by separatists on 16 September, in Mamfe, were released alive.
- On 25 October, a CDC worker was abducted by forces loyal to the Ambazonia People's Liberation Council. He was released two days later.

== November ==
- On 3 November, the CDC worker who had been abducted on 25 October was executed by separatist fighters in Menja. Ambazonian commander, General Gideon (born Chamberlain Ntou'ou Ndong), was reportedly killed by Cameroonian forces along the Kumba-Buea highway.
- On 5 November, Ambazonian soldiers shot and killed a businessman commonly known as King Boy in the Mbessi neighborhood in Bamenda.
- On 10 November, an Ambazonian commander known as "General Basile" was arrested by the Nigerian police in Kurmi, Taraba State.
- On 15 November, a Cameroonian soldier was shot and killed by separatists in the Northwest Region.
- On 24 November, a civilian was killed in an armed attack in Awing, Santa.
- On 27 November, three separatist fighters including "General Fire of Bamuka" (born Etienne Njoya) were killed in an operation launched by Cameroonian forces in Bamessing, Ndop.

== December ==
- On 2 December, two separatist fighters were killed and more were injured in a BIR raid in Mamfe.
- On 4 December, an Ambazonian commander, General Etah and others were reportedly killed by Cameroonian forces operating between Kumba and Mamfe.
- On 5 December, separatists abducted eight civilians in Ekondo-Titi.
- On 7 December, the Cameroonian Army announced that it would take over road construction projects near the Nigerian border, after separatist activity had forced road workers to abandon their work. In Menchum, a Fulani militia killed four civilians.
- On 9 December, a separatist commander known as "General Lion" was killed by Cameroonian forces in Mankon village, Mezam. The ADF retaliated by announcing a week-long blockade of the Mankon highway.
- On 15–16 December, separatists carried out a string of attacks against Cameroonian forces in Kumbo, Ndop, Mamfe and elsewhere, causing an undetermined number of casualties.
- On 17 December, Cameroonian soldiers invaded the village of Yer in Bui killing at least three people and burning down close to a dozen houses.
- On 19 December, several houses were set on fire allegedly by Cameroonian forces in Bai Panya, Meme Department in the Southwest Region.
- On 22 December, Cameroonian soldiers were recorder burning down at least 12 houses in Yer, Jakiri. Locals said that the army carried out a reprisal attack against civilians. The Cameroonian Army said it had attacked a separatist camp and freed hostages. The Cameroonian Army claimed to have suffered no casualties, while at least four separatists were killed. The separatists claimed to have killed seven soldiers.
- On 23 December, Cameroonian forces killed a Seven Karta commander known as "One Blood" in Bafut, and displayed his corpse in public.
