= Timeline of the Anglophone Crisis (2021) =

Conflict, started 2017, in Cameroon

This is a timeline of the Anglophone Crisis in Cameroon during 2021.

The Anglophone Crisis is an ongoing armed conflict in the Republic of Cameroon in Central Africa, where historically English-speaking Ambazonian separatists are seeking the independence of the former British trust territory of Southern Cameroons, which was unified with Cameroon since 1961.

== January ==
- On 1 January, two suspected separatists were killed by Cameroonian soldiers in Wum.
- On 6 January, separatist fighters ambushed the convoy of the Senior Divisional Officer of Momo near Njikwa, using improvised explosive devices (IEDs). Five soldiers and one civilian were killed.
- On 7 January, soldiers discovered and deactivated an improvised explosive device in Kumba.
- On 8 January, separatists killed three gendarme officers, one policeman and two civilians at a checkpoint in Matazem. Four others were injured.
- On 9 January, armed men killed a school principal in Ossing, Manyu. In Tinto, Manyu, armed men shot a student and a teacher.
- On 10 January, Cameroonian soldiers invaded Mautu, Muyuka and killed at least nine civilians. Human rights groups and France condemned the act and called for an investigation, while the Cameroonian Army denied having massacred civilians, claiming that all the dead were separatists and that images of dead civilians had been collected by separatists from elsewhere.
- On 12–16 January, security forces carried out mass arrests of civilians in Limbe, Buea, Muyuka and Tiko.
- On 14 January, explosions were heard outside Limbe Omnisport Stadium. A separatist militia called the "Fako Action Forces" claimed responsibility.
- On 14–15 January, suspected separatists killed at least five soldiers in Muyuka and Tiko.
- On 15 January, suspected separatists burned a beer truck in Likomba, Fako Division. Security forces pursued the attackers, and an ensuing shootout left two suspected separatists dead.
- On 16 January, 2020 African Nations Championship (CHAN) started in Limbe, after having been postponed a year due to the COVID-19 pandemic. Separatists had threatened to use force to prevent the championship from taking place within the Anglophone regions.
- On 18 January, Cameroon's Minister of Territorial Administration, Paul Atanga, stated that Cameroon had won the war against the separatists. Hours later, two IEDs exploded in Mbengwi and in T-Junction, Bamenda. The same day, separatists declared a 10-day lockdown to sabotage CHAN, and clashes were reported in Buea. The Biafra Nations League, a Nigeria-based group that operates in Bakassi Peninsula, complained that some of its members as well as pro-Ambazonian activists had been arrested and tortured by Cameroonian soldiers. They also accused Nigerian authorities of allowing Cameroonian troops to conduct cross-border raids to arrest Ambazonians on Nigerian territory. The group declared that they would hoist the Biafran flag in the Bakassi Peninsula, and claimed that the locals identified more as Biafrans than as Cameroonians.
- On 20 January, unidentified gunmen abducted a radio host in Bamenda.
- On 21 January, separatist fighters attacked a gendarmerie facility in Babadjou, West Region. Cameroonian soldiers repelled the attack and also seized two vehicles.
- On 23 January, Cameroonian soldiers killed four children in Bamenda. The military later falsely claimed that the victims were separatist fighters.
- On 25 January, at least three policemen were wounded when a roadside IED exploded in Limbe.
- On 26 January, there was an explosion outside the stadium in Limbe, forcing spectators to take shelter.
- On 27 January, Cameroonian soldiers killed two people and arrested another two in Bambui.
- On 31 January, two people were injured in an explosion in Douala, possibly caused by an IED.

== February ==
- On 1 February, Cameroonian soldiers "neutralized" two armed separatists in Bamenda, and captured a separatist commander known as "General Sweet Tuma". In Buea, ex-separatist fighters barricaded streets to protest the living conditions in the Disarmament, Demobilization and Reintegration Center, and the failure of the program to help them find work.
- On 2–4 February, separatist fighters blocked the Buea-Kumba highway.
- On 3 February, three public employees were abducted by suspected separatists in Bamenda, allegedly for sealing shops whose owners respected separatist-imposed ghost towns.
- On 4 February, armed men attacked an ambulance belonging to the Médecins Sans Frontières (MSF) in Muyuka, critically wounding one nurse.
- On 5 February, Cameroonian soldiers rescued four civilian hostages from a separatist camp outside Bamenda. The Cameroonian Army reported to have suffered no casualties, and claimed that four separatist fighters were killed in the fighting. One civilian was wounded during the raid.
- On 8 February, two soldiers were killed in Bamenda.
- On 9 February, separatist commanders Augustine Ambe ("General Above the Law") and Celestine Wanche ("T-Boy") were killed in a raid on their camp outside Kumba. Clashes took place in Ediki and Mbalangi, along the Buea-Kumba road. In Nigeria, the Biafra Nations League, formally allied with Ambazonia since September 2020, declared that it was moving its operational base to the Bakassi Peninsula in Cameroon, a direct challenge to Cameroon's territorial sovereignty.
- On 13 February, separatist fighters alleged to belong to the Red Dragon militia under "Field Marshal" Lekeaka Oliver killed three traditional rulers in Essoh Attah, Lebialem. This act marked an escalation of the conflict; while separatists had a history of abducting traditional rulers, intentional killings were rare.
- On 14 February, three officers of the Cameroon Navy were killed and another was wounded in a separatist ambush in Bekora, Ndian Division. In Ndu, soldiers were videotaped torturing a civilian to near death. In Fundong, armed separatists abducted the Fon of Kom, accusing him of collaborating with the Cameroonian Army. A few hours later, locals stormed the separatist camp and rescued the Fon.
- On 15 February, a Cameroon Army captain was killed in a separatist ambush in Kumbo. In Bamenda, former separatists who had laid down their arms stormed the streets to protest what they considered to be broken promises by the Cameroonian government.
- On 17 February, armed Fulani robbed and tortured civilians in Nfap, and burned their houses.
- On 18 February, seven Cameroonian soldiers were killed by an IED in Babessi.
- On 23 February, two separatist fighters were killed in Bambili.
- Between 21–28 February, a series of attacks by armed Fulani forced more than 4,200 people to flee from their homes in Nwa. At least ten people were killed, including a former Divisional Officer.
- On 23–24 February, cattle rearers killed five civilians and burned down houses in Nwa. The Cameroonian Army did not intervene.
- On 24 February, at least two soldiers were killed and at least another five were wounded in a separatist ambush in Kumbo. Following the incident, soldiers went on a shooting spree while searching for the attackers. In Njipchih, armed Fulani burned down houses.
- On 27 February, separatists abducted a medical doctor and accused him of not supporting the cause, releasing him six hours later, after he paid them a ransom of 300,000 CFA (US$544).

== March ==
- On 1 March, Cameroonian soldiers burned down facilities of a hospital in Kumbo.
- On 2 March, a separatist commander known as "General Goddy Elangwe" surrendered to Cameroonian authorities.
- On 3 March, the Cameroonian Army announced that it had "neutralized" 12 separatist fighters and wounded several more in Bui, while itself suffering three dead soldiers and seven seriously wounded. Separatist losses included a commander known as "General Asan". The offensive, which was titled "Operation Bui 1", had taken eight days and involved more than 400 soldiers and was led by Colonel Charles Alain Matiang. Days later, the Cameroonian Army adjusted its estimate of separatist losses to be 15 dead.
- On 4 March, a soldier was killed in Kumbo.
- On 5 March, a separatist militia known as the Bui Warriors launched a series of IED attacks against Cameroonian soldiers in Bui, followed by an attack on a prison. The Bui Warriors claimed to have killed at least five soldiers with the IED attacks alone. Clashes also took place in Bamenda.
- On 6 March, "General Efang" of the Ambazonia Defence Forces (ADF) publicly apologized to the population for war crimes committed by some separatist elements. He claimed that separatist fighters abusing civilians were often under the influence of drugs, and lamented that this had led to the creation of pro-government local paramilitaries.
- On 7 March, Cameroon claimed to have killed at least 23 separatist fighters within the last week, including 15 in "Operation Bui 1". Locals claimed that this figure included unarmed civilians. In Akum, four civilians were killed and more were wounded when gunmen attacked two busses. Witnesses claimed that the attackers were separatists.
- On 8 March, a separatist commander known as "General Nokia" was captured by Cameroonian soldiers in Konye.
- On 10 March, at least two Cameroonian soldiers were killed when separatists ambushed a military control post in Bamenda. Clashes were also recorded elsewhere in the city. In Ndu, pro-government Fulani militants killed a community leader.
- On 13 March, a journalist was kidnapped in Buea.
- On 18 March, an Ambazonian commander known as "General Spirito" was killed in a raid by the Rapid Intervention Battalion (BIR) in Meme, alongside five other separatist fighters.
- On 22 March, at least one Cameroonian soldier was killed and more were wounded in a separatist attack in Eyumodjock.
- On 25 March, a child was killed by an IED in Kumba.
- On 26 March, suspected separatists attacked a UN humanitarian convoy in Ikata, Muyuka with automatic weapons. There were no casualties, but the vehicles were seriously damaged. On 4 April, the UN Coordinator of Humanitarian Affairs in Cameroon condemned the attack.

== April ==
- On 1 April, the separatist fighters from the Ambazonia Defence Forces (ADF) attacked and destroyed the residence of a gendarmerie general in Upper Banyang.
- On 2 April, separatist fighters killed at least one civilian driver along the Mamfe-Eko highway.
- On 4 April, a police officer was killed on the Bamenda-Bali road in a suspected separatist ambush. In Ikiliwindi, separatist fighters abducted 12 civilians.
- On 7 April, the head of the Disarmament, Demobilization, and Reintegration Centre in Bamenda was abducted from his home.
- On 9 April, the Ambazonia Governing Council and the ADF formally allied with the Indigenous People of Biafra (IPOB) and its armed wing, the Eastern Security Network (ESN), led by Nnamdi Kanu. By that time, the ESN had been at war with the Nigerian central government for nearly three months.
- On 10 April, three BIR soldiers were wounded when their vehicle struck an IED between Kumbo and Ndop.
- On 11 April, separatist commander "General Blink" was killed in Bambelle.
- On 12 April, Cameroonian soldiers burned several houses in Nkot, Nwa.
- On 16 April, separatist commander "General Idi Amin Dada" was killed in Guneko.
- On 17 April, Cameroonian soldiers rescued nine hostages who were held at a separatist camp in Santa. Two fighters were killed during the raid, while 20 escaped. The hostages claimed to have been subjected to torture, and that three hostages had joined the separatists. During the raid, Cameroonian forces arrested and tortured civilians in nearby towns. In Nguti, Koupé-Manengouba, Cameroonian forces attempted to raid a separatist camp. The separatists spotted the troops and attacked first, killing two soldiers before withdrawing. In response, Cameroonian forces killed four civilians and wounded another four in the area, and carried out a number of arrests.
- On 18 April, following clashes with separatists Mile 90, Bamenda, Cameroonian soldiers entered a local bar and massacred at least five civilians.
- On 19 April, separatist commander "General Cobra" and four of his fighters were captured in Bamenda.
- On 23 April, a former politician from the Social Democratic Front (SDF) was abducted in Bamenda. In Bafut, separatist fighters attacked the convoy of the Divisional Officer, injuring at least four people.
- On 24 April, a military convoy was attacked in Alou. A military vehicle struck an IED, and subsequently came under heavy fire from the surrounding bushes. The Red Dragon militia claimed responsibility. A similar attack was carried out in Bafut, where the Seven Karta militia blew up a military vehicle with an IED.
- On 24–25 April, separatists killed an unspecified number of Cameroonian soldiers in Kumbo and Bafut.
- On 28 April, separatist fighters from the "Fako Action Restoration Forces" burned down a bar in Limbe, alleging that the owners had been serving drinks that the separatists had banned.
- On 29 April, separatist fighters from the militia "Bambalang Marine Forces" attacked a military base in Galim, Bamboutos, West Region, killing four Cameroonian soldiers, injuring one, and seizing several weapons. The separatists suffered no casualties, and subsequently released a video online. The separatists claimed to have launched the attack to set free three civilians who had been abducted by the military in Ngoketundjia.
- On 30 April, separatist fighters carried out an IED attack on soldiers in Bui, causing an unknown number of casualties. In Bamenda, there were clashes in the neighborhood of Rendezvous.

== May ==
- On 1 May, two Cameroonian soldiers were captured and summarily executed by separatist fighters in Akwaya.
- On 4 May, separatists ambushed a military vehicle with an IED in Akwaya, before firing at it from the surrounding woods. Casualties were later airlifted out by the Cameroonian military. Another IED attack was carried out in Ekona by a separatist militia known as the Fako Action Forces. Separatist fighters also blockaded the Batibo road.
- On 5 May, the Fako Action Forces claimed responsibility for burning down the residence of the Divisional Officer of Muyuka.
- On 6 May, at least one civilian was killed in Njikwa, as Cameroonian troops burned civilian homes.
- During the first week of May, at least 24 civilians and soldiers were killed by IEDs according to Cameroon's Defence Minister Beti Assomo.
- On 8–9 May, soldiers freed at least four hostages in a raid on a separatist camp in Tanka, Bamenda. Neither side suffered casualties. Clashes were also reported in Kumbo.
- On 9 May, three people were killed and four were injured when a bus hit an IED in Sabga. Separatists claimed responsibility, and said that the IED had been meant for military targets.
- On 11 May, Cameroonian troops killed separatist commander "General Njayoh" in Mbonge.
- On 13 May, local authorities claimed that Cameroonian soldiers had disarmed an IED in a market in Meme that could have killed more than a dozen people. General Presido of the Ambazonia Self-Defence Council denied that separatists had planted such a bomb.
- On 14 May, eight suspected separatists were killed in Konye and near Buea.
- On 15 May, separatist militia "Fako Mountain Lions" invaded Muyuka and the village of Muea in Buea, paraded their fighters in the streets and dared the Cameroonian Army to fight them. Two Cameroonian soldiers were killed in a subsequent battle, in which a military vehicle was destroyed. The separatists were reported to have heavy weapons. In Konye, Cameroonian forces ambushed and killed at least six separatist fighters who were setting up roadblocks. The Cameroonian Army announced the start of "Operation Bui Clean" (also reported as "Operation Kumbo Clean") to neutralize separatists in Bui.
- On 16 May, separatists launched an offensive against the Cameroonian military in Bui, and a military convoy hit an IED in Meluf. Cameroonian troops retaliated by burning down civilian houses in the villages of Tadu, Vekovi and Buh, in Bui. Heavy fighting would continue for several days. In Bambalang, 14 suspected separatists were killed.
- On 18 May, Cameroonian soldiers killed at least two people and burned more than 50 civilian houses in Kumbo.
- In the week leading up to 20 May, Cameroon's National Day, at least 16 people were killed. Separatists moved to boycott celebrations.
- On 22 May, two civilians, including a priest, were abducted by separatist fighters in Mamfe and held for nine days, before being released without ransom.

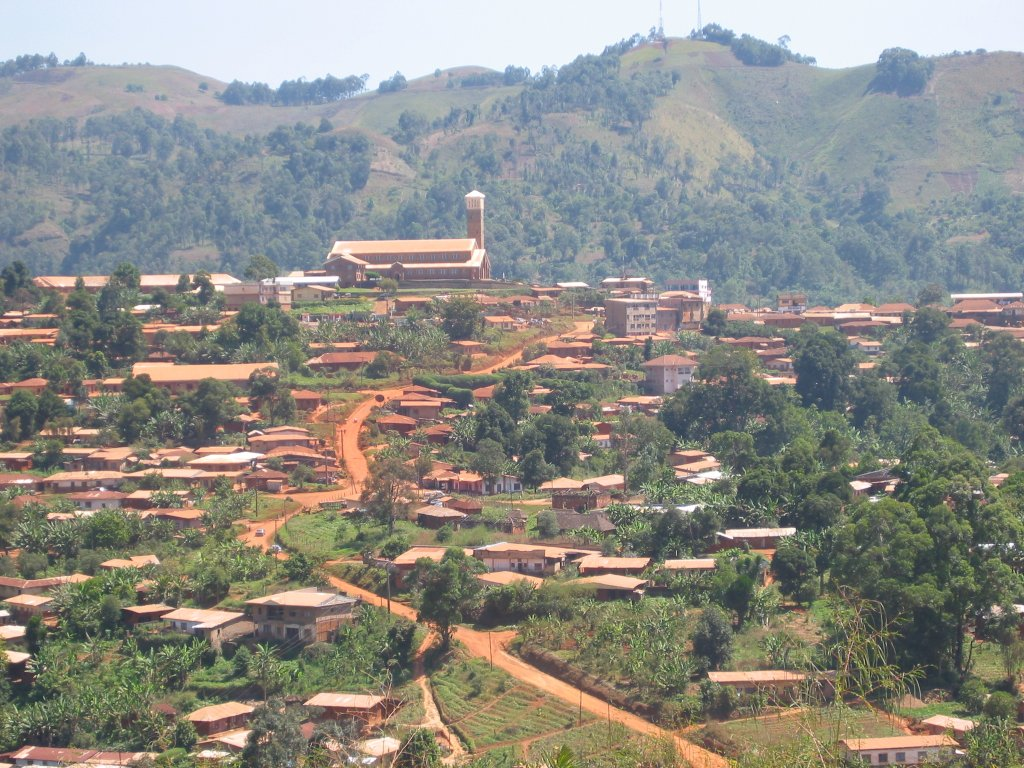
May and June saw heavy urban fighting in Kumbo, the capital of Bui Division.

- On 23–25 May, heavy fighting took place in Kumbo, where more than 25 Cameroonian soldiers were killed and more than 12 military vehicles were damaged or destroyed.
- On 24 May, the Camerooninan Army claimed to have killed separatist commander "General Akwaba" and an unspecified number of fighters in a raid on their camp in Kumbo.
- On 25 May, five Cameroonian soldiers, including a brigade commander, were killed when separatist militia the Bambalang Marine Forces attacked an army outpost in Noni in Bui. The separatists also seized weapons and equipment. In Ekona, the Fako Mountain Lions carried out three IED attacks against the Cameroonian army, and three civilians were killed in the subsequent gunfights. In Jakiri, Bui, Cameroonian soldiers arrested three people and subsequently murdered them.
- On 26 May, two soldiers were killed in a separatist ambush with IEDs in Ekondo-Titi, while others fled under fire, leaving their vehicles behind. Separatist group "The Expendable 100" claimed responsibility. In Bamenda, separatist fighters shot a civilian multiple times, reportedly after he had publicly criticized their activities. He died from his wounds days later. The killing led to a backlash against separatists in Bamenda; on 31 May, people demonstrated in front of the palace of the Fon of Nkwen, defying a separatist "ghost town".
- On 29 May, Cameroonian soldiers beat and extorted civilians in Yer in Nso, Bui.
- On 30 May, a Cameroonian Army armored vehicle hit an IED and fell into a valley in Oku, Bui. The "Ambazonia Intelligence Forces", loyal to the Ambazonia Self-Defence Council, claimed responsibility. In Kombou, Babadjou, unidentified armed men killed two civilians in a possible Ambazonian cross-border raid into West Region.
- On 31 May, Cameroonian soldiers killed a separatist fighter and a civilian in Luh, Ndu. In Ako, Cameroonian soldiers summarily executed at least eight civilians, most of whom were dragged out of their beds early in the morning.

== June ==
- On 1 June, the Cameroonian Army claimed to have captured a separatist training camp and killed four fighters in Ekuru, Donga Mantung.
- On 2 June, separatist fighters assassinated a relative of Cameroon's Prime Minister Joseph Ngute in Marumba, Mbonge, accusing him of espionage.
- On 3 June, separatist fighters carried out three IED ambushes against military vehicles in Kumbo and Nkum.
- On 5 June, at least five Cameroonian soldiers were reportedly killed when separatist fighters attacked a military control post in Mabonji, outside Kumba. Reinforcements that were called failed to arrive in time, and the separatists seized guns before withdrawing. In Balikumbat, Cameroonian soldiers killed eight civilians, possibly after mistaking them for separatists. In Bafanji, Ngoketunjia, the Cameroonian Army claimed to have killed five separatist fighters and captured another three.
- On 6 June, unidentified gunmen attacked a group of priests, killing two and wounding 11. Separatists and the Cameroonian military blamed each other.
- On 8 June, two separatist fighters and four civilians were killed in a Cameroonian attack in Chumba, Mezam. Separatist commander "General Cobra" was reported to have been captured; he had previously been reported captured in April.
- On 8–9 June, according to Human Rights Watch, Cameroonian soldiers killed two civilians, raped a woman, destroyed or raided at least 33 buildings, including the palace of a traditional ruler in Mbuluf, Northwest Region.
- On 9 June, Cameroonian soldiers killed a civilian in Nwa.
- On 13 June, separatists burned down the house of the leader of a pro-government vigilante group in Mengoh. In Kumbo, six civilians were killed by an IED. Capo Daniel, deputy commander of the Ambazonia Defence Forces, claimed that the victims had been inside military vehicles when the attack occurred, and said that they considered military vehicles to be legitimate targets.
- On 14 June, the Fako Action Forces attacked a military truck and police forces in Muea, Buea. Two police officers were shot. In Otu, Eyumodjock, eight soldiers or policemen were killed in a separatist ambush, and another four were injured.
- On 15 June, separatist fighters led by "General Ten Kobo" abducted six Divisional Delegates in Ekondo-Titi, and subsequently demanded 60 million CFA for their release. One of the abducted was killed in captivity days later. In August 2023, a former separatist fighter led Cameroonian forces to a mass grave that contained the remains of the remaining five hostages, as well as those of four other civilians.
- On 17 June, it was reported that Cameroon had sent 300 additional troops to Bui in order to expel separatist fighters from the area and disarm IEDs.
- On 18 June, two Cameroonian soldiers were killed and another one was wounded in a separatist attack in Nguti, Koupé-Manengouba.
- On 19 June, three or four gendarmes were killed when the Bambalang Marine Forces overwhelmed a military checkpoint in Bamali. In Ekona, one Cameroonian soldier was killed and two separatist fighters were injured in a shoot-out.
- On 21 June, five Cameroonian soldiers were killed in a Bambalang Marine Forces raid on a gendarmerie brigade in Lassin, Noni, Bui. The separatists seized all their weapons before withdrawing. In Lebialem, the Red Dragon ambushed two military vehicles with IEDs and exchanged fire with Cameroonian soldiers for ten minutes, killing an unspecified number. The battle was filmed.
- On 22 June, it was reported that hundreds of soldiers and several armed personnel carriers were on the way to Ngo-Ketunjia with the aim of neutralizing the Bambalang Marine Forces and General No Pity. Five people were arrested for manufacturing IEDs. In Balikumbat, separatist fighters attacked the residence of the Divisional Officer, retreating after seizing ammunition. A Cameroonian military vehicle transporting reinforcements hit an IED, injuring two gendarmes. One civilian was also killed in the crossfire.
- On 23 June, Chinese-made WZ-551 armoured personnel carriers and Type 07P infantry fighting vehicles were spotted in Douala, raising speculations that they were headed for the Anglophone regions.
- On 24 June, the Red Dragon militia ambushed a military convoy with IEDs.
- On 25 June, Nigerian special forces arrested Ambazonian exiles in Ikom, Cross River State. Nigerian authorities said the arrests were a response to Ambazonians attacking Nigerian security forces and stealing weapons. The Biafra Nations League, which was allied with Ambazonia, claimed that among those arrested was Ambazonian commander "General Black Mamba". In Bui, Cameroonian forces invaded Jakiri, burning down a number of houses and forcing civilians to flee their homes.
- On 26 June, separatists attacked the Kossala Gendarmerie Brigade in Kumba, using rocket launchers, killing at least ten gendarmes.
- On 29 June, after an alleged botched attempt to abduct John Fru Ndi's brother in Mamfe, separatist fighters clashed with Cameroonian security forces.
- At some point in late-June, the Cameroonian Army announced the conclusion of Operation Bui Clean, which had been launched on 15 May.
- Overall, according to the Cameroonian military, 40 people were killed in June, 70 houses were burned down, and at least 30 gun battles were fought. Both sides blamed each other for atrocities.

== July ==
- On 1 July, suspected separatists killed a teacher in Kumba.
- On 2 July, separatist fighters opened fire on a vehicle on the Kumba-Mamfe road, killing a Nigerian citizen. Another civilian was injured.
- On 4 July, Cameroonian soldiers killed a civilian at a police control post in Below Foncha, Bamenda. The killing sparked mass protests, during which civilians destroyed the control post.
- On 6 July, two separatist fighters were killed in Bamenda.
- On 7 July, separatists abducted two police officers in Kumba. In Bui, separatist fighters attacked a military control post in Njavyuy, killing one police officer and injuring a soldier and a gendarme. One separatist fighter was also killed. In Belo, separatist fighters ambushed a military patrol.
- On 8 July, the Fon of Baforkum was found dead, a month after he had been abducted from his palace by suspected separatists.
- On 11 July, it was reported that 11 separatist fighters had been killed in Big Babanki and Banga Bakundu.
- On 14 July, two gendarmes were killed and another was wounded by separatists dressed in Cameroonian military uniforms in Zavion, Babadjou, West Region, closely bordering Lebialem. The dead gendarmes were beheaded.
- On 16 July, fighting between the Cameroonian Army and the Bambalang Marine Forces in Balikumbat left an estimated 15 separatists and five Cameroonian soldiers dead.
- On 18 July, five police officers were killed when separatists ambushed their vehicle with an IED in Bali.
- On 19 July, separatist fighters were recorded dismembering a Cameroonian soldier in Bamenda.
- On 23 July, the Seven Karta militia carried out a double IED ambush against Cameroonian troops in Bafut, inflicting an unknown number of casualties.

== August ==
- On 1 August, the Fako Mountain Lions ambushed a gendarme patrol in Muea, killing one and injuring two. The separatists took off with weapons and ammunition. In Mveh, Lebialem, the Red Dragon militia ambushed a military vehicle with an IED, causing an unspecified number of casualties. In Bamenda, Cameroonian troops rescued a soldier from an Ambazonian detention facility, hours before his scheduled execution.
- On 2 August, separatist fighters attacked a military base in Nsanakang and seized weapons and equipment.
- On 3 August, General No Pity of the Bambalang Marine Forces revealed that Cameroonian troops had arrested members of his extended family that day. In an audio message, he gave Cameroon 48 hours to release his family members, threatening to invade Francophone regions and target civilians.
- On 4 August, two Cameroonian soldiers were killed in a separatist IED attack in Kumbo. Cameroonian troops subsequently killed seven civilians in Firkov-Meluf, Kumbo.
- On 7 August, the Cameroonian Army announced that it had neutralized General No Pity and some of his fighters in Bambalang; however, General No Pity later emerged alive, proving the announcement false. This was the second time that General No Pity had been falsely reported dead; the first such incident had been in March 2020. In Bamenda, three civilians were killed by suspected separatists.
- On 12 August, separatists abducted a man they accused of selling products that they had banned in Bamenda. The man was later killed in captivity.
- On 17 August, a local vigilante group killed one separatist fighter and captured another in Wum.
- On 19 August, the Cameroonian Army declared the conclusion of a week-long offensive against separatists in Bali, and said that it had killed 11 separatist fighters in two separate battles. Separatist casualties included two commanders.
- On 20 August, a Superintendent of Police, with her daughter, niece, and Army were driving in a convoy along the Ediki road located around the outskirts of Kumba, South West Region when they were ambushed by some unidentified Ambazonian terrorists. They managed to escape the ambush but the Superintendent of Police and Army were both victims of gunshots on their leg. They were immediately rushed to the Regional Hospital in Buea for proper medical attention.
- On 22 August, Cameroonian soldiers attacked a church in Bali, killing one worshipper and injuring a pastor. In Bamenda, an aid worker was mortally injured in an attack and died the following day.
- On 23 August, Cameroonian soldiers killed a 16-year old in Bamti, Noni, Bui. In Elak Oku, separatists fighters under General No Pity set fire to the Mayor's residence, a market and a council building. The attack was reportedly a punishment against the population for not observing Monday ghost towns.
- On 24 August, separatists ambushed Cameroonian troops with an IED in Ntumbaw, Ndu. The IED missed the target, but the separatists shot and fatally wounded one gendarme and took off with weapons. The gendarme died the next day.
- On 27 August, the Bambalang Marine Forces attacked the Tolong Gendarmerie Brigade base in Oku with a rocket-propelled grenade, then stormed the facility, killed one gendarme and took off with weapons. The separatists returned later the same day and set the building on fire.
- On 28 August, at least two Cameroonian soldiers were killed and another two were injured in a separatist ambush on a check point in Lipenja, Southwest Region.
- On 29 August, a priest from the Mamfe diocese was abducted by separatist fighters, who went on to demand 20 million CFA franc for his release. He was freed on 31 August.
- On 30 August, two Cameroonian soldiers were killed when separatists attacked a military convoy in Mundemba. The separatists seized their weapons and took off.

== September ==
- On 9–10 September, nine teachers were abducted by alleged separatists on the Kumbo-Ndop highway. In Kumbo, two alleged thieves were executed by separatists in the main market.
- On 11 September, at least seven Cameroonian soldiers were killed when separatists ambushed a military convoy in Kikaikilaiki, between Ndu and Kumbo. Separatist militia "the Bui Warriors" claimed responsibility. Two soldiers were also killed in Misaje, Donga Mantung, and a police officer was killed in Bamenda.
- On 12 September, at least four separatist fighters were killed in Bamenda.
- On 13 September, the Cameroonian Army carried out raids in Kumbo in which it claimed to have killed 13 separatist fighters. Locals claimed that the military had killed several civilians. In Tatum, Bui, a soldier was killed in a separatist ambush. In Kumba, a civilian was killed by stray bullets during a gunfight between separatists and government troops.
- On 15 September, a two-week, region-wide lockdown (named the "Guterres Lockdown") initiated by the Sako-led IG came into force, and ordinary life came to a halt in several cities. The AGovC opposed the lockdown on humanitarian grounds, as well as wanting to focus on 1 October independence day celebrations.
- On 16 September 15 soldiers were killed and two armored vehicles destroyed by the Bambalang Marine Forces and Jaguars of Bamessing during an ambush in Bamessing. The separatists used sophisticated anti-tank rockets, likely imported from Nigeria. Separatists led by General No Pity filmed themselves celebrating next to the burning vehicles, then took off with weapons. This was one of the deadliest single attacks to date. Cameroonian forces later went to search for the separatists in Babanki, and killed at least two civilians.
- On 18 September 26 soldiers were injured in a road accident near Bamenda when they were on the way to the frontline, 10 of them seriously. In Njinikom, Boyo, separatists ambushed a Cameroonian Army armored vehicle with an IED.
- On 19 September, separatists led by "General Inches" and "Commander Api" attacked an armored vehicle with an IED in Bafut, possibly killing everyone on board. The attack was filmed.
- On 22 September, Cameroon's Defense Minister Joseph Beti Assomo announced a "paradigm shift" following the 16 September ambush.
- On 23 September, the Bui Warriors attacked a prison in Kumbo, killing one soldier and injuring several while suffering no losses themselves.
- On 23 September, separatist fighters led by "Commander Pay Cash" ambushed a military vehicle with an IED in Small Ekombe, killing three soldiers. Three separatist, including "Commander Pay Cash" returned to the scene the next day, only to be ambushed and killed.
- On 25 September, one Cameroonian soldier was killed and eight were wounded in a separatist IED attack in Kumbo. Their vehicle was completely destroyed. The Bui Warriors claimed responsibility for the attack.
- On 26 September, the Seven Karta militia and another Mankon-based separatist group attacked and looted the Agyati Gendarmerie Brigade in Bafut. At least one Cameroonian soldier was killed in the attack. In Ndu, one Cameroonian soldier was killed during a clash with separatist fighters.
- On 30 September, at least three Cameroonian soldiers were killed in a separatist ambush in Bamali. The separatist armed men reportedly opened fire on the soldiers who were on patrol in Bamali.

== October ==
- On 1 October, Ambazonia celebrated its independence day. In Wanti, Northwest Region, one Cameroonian soldier and two separatist fighters were killed during clashes. In Bamenda, the Cameroonian Army claimed to have killed a high-ranking soldier of the Bambalang Marine Forces.
- On 5 October, a visit by Prime Minister Joseph Ngute to Bamenda was interrupted by distant gunfire. Ngute was quickly rushed to his car. However, the military maintained that it did not fire back at the shooters who were able to escape. In Ntundip, Ndu, Cameroonian troops burned several houses and raped a 15-year-old girl.
- On 7 October, Cameroonian soldiers set fire to more than a dozen houses in Kikiakom, Kumbo.
- On 14 October, a 5-year-old girl was shot and killed by a gendarme in Buea, reportedly after her driver had refused to pay a road bribe to the gendarme. The gendarme was promptly lynched by an angry crowd, and mass protests erupted across the city. The authorities urged the public to be calm, while security forces deployed to disperse the crowds. In response to the killing, separatists banned all traffic between Buea and Kumba for two days. Gunshots were reported in the Molyko neighborhood. In Kumbo, another civilian was killed by Cameroonian soldiers.
- On 18 October, a Cameroonian soldier was killed in Waindo, Wum. Cameroonian troops and Fulani militants subsequently invaded the neighborhood for 48 hours, killing seven civilians and burning down 13 houses.
- On 20 October, SOCADEF ambushed a military convoy in Ekiliwindi with at least five IEDs. In Mbesa, one separatist fighter was killed. It was also reported that a border town sitting on the road to Mfum and Ikom had come under Ambazonian control, enabling separatists to screen Nigerians crossing the border.
- On 21 October, two Cameroonian soldiers were killed and another was wounded in a separatist ambush in Ngie, Momo; the attack was carried out by "General Manboy" from the ADF. The Cameroonian Army said it had repelled another ambush on a military convoy in a village named Shuk, and that it had killed seven separatist fighters and injured dozens more. One Cameroonian soldier was also injured in the encounter.
- On 21–21 October, the Cameroonian Army went on the offensive to eliminate General No Pity. Heavy fighting in Mbesa, Fundong between Cameroonian forces and the Bambalang Marine Forces left at least four separatists and two Cameroonian soldiers dead. Another three Cameroonian soldiers were wounded and were airlifted away with a helicopter. Three civilians were also killed during the fighting. Cameroonian forces ultimately failed to kill General No Pity, who resurfaced in Manyu after several days of heavy fighting.
- On 22 October, according to locals, Cameroonian soldiers crossed the Nigerian border into Taraba State to search for Ambazonian separatists in the villages of Mairogo and Tosso.
- On 27 October, Cameroonian soldiers and Fulani militants killed a 15-year-old in Ngarbuh, Ndu, having accused him of assisting separatists.
- On 29 October, ADF commander "General Cross and Die" and five other separatists were killed in two separate operations in Bamenda and Bali. In early-November, the ADF killed four people whom they accused of assisting the military to kill the commander.

== November ==
- On 1 November, separatists attacked a cab driver in Buea with an IED, accusing him of not respecting ghost towns.
- On 2 November, gunmen abducted a government official in Ngoketunjia and demanded a ransom for his release.
- On 3 November, at least two Cameroonian soldiers were killed in an ambush in Ekondo Titi.
- On 8 November, a cab driver was killed in an explosion in Buea. A separatist group known as the "Ghost Fighters" claimed responsibility. Across the Anglophone regions, separatists carried out several large-scale abductions of civilians for ghost town violations. The ADF alone claimed to have abducted hundreds of civilians. In one incident, separatists stopped a bus and beat the passengers with sticks.
- On 10 November 11 students were injured in a bomb attack at the University of Buea.
- On 12 November, police officers in Bamenda opened fire on a truck, killing a seven-year-old girl. Mass protests erupted across the city, during which Cameroonian soldiers used live bullets against protesters, killing at least two. In Mbusoh, Ndu, gunmen abducted at least 14 road workers.
- On 13 November, separatists ambushed a military convoy in Santa, killing five police officers, three gendarmes and one civilian.
- On 14 November, Cameroonian soldiers invaded a hospital in Kumbo while on a search for separatist fighters. No fighters were found. During the invasion, the soldiers tortured hospital guards and threatened to shoot nurses.
- On 15 November, gendarmes fired at a group of dancers in Buea, killing one and injuring others. Authorities later blamed separatists for the act, which was denied by eyewitnesses. In Bamenda, two separatists were killed during a shootout with police forces.
- On 17 November, Nigerian authorities claimed that Ambazonian forces had invaded Takum, Taraba State, using speedboats and "sophisticated weapons". Nigerian senator Emmanuel Bwacha said that Ambazonian separatists had destroyed the village of Manga and killed 11 people, including the village chief. The senator asked the president to deploy the army to expel the Ambazonians from Nigerian territory. Afterwards, the Senate held a moment of silence for the dead. Separatists denied any involvement, with AGovC leader Ayaba Cho Lucas speculating that the invasion might have been a Cameroonian false flag operation to drag Nigeria into the war.
- On 18 November, separatists ambushed a military patrol in Mbalangi, Mbonge, killing one soldier and injuring several others.
- On 19 November, separatists blew up a military vehicle in Bamenda with an IED, causing an unknown number of casualties. The ADF claimed responsibility.
- On 24 November, unidentified gunmen attacked a school in Ekondo-Titi and killed three students and a teacher. In Momo, Cameroonian forces killed separatist commander "General King Commando".
- On 30 November, the ADF abducted a representative from the Cameroon Water Utilities Corporation (CAMWATER) and demanded 10 million CFA franc for his release. The ADF justified the abduction by claiming that CAMWATER illegally charged people for water and electricity. In Ngarbuh, two Cameroonian soldiers were killed in a separatist attack.

== December ==
- On 3 December, separatists attacked a military outpost in Jakiri, killing at least three Cameroonian soldiers.
- On 7 December, prominent traditional leader Fon Kevin Shumitang II was abducted in Bambalang.
- On 8 December, several houses were burned down in Bamenda by men in military uniforms, causing an undetermined number of casualties. Some residents said it was a revenge attack by the Cameroonian military following a separatist attack the day before.
- On 9 December, separatists ambushed a BIR patrol with an IED in Mbengwi, killing one soldier. A similar ambush took place in Bamenda, and the ensuing gunfight saw the deaths of four separatist fighters. According to locals, over the following days some 13 civilians were killed in Mbengwi by Cameroonian soldiers. The Cameroonian Army disputed this.
- On 13 December, the Buea Ghost Fighters bombed Bongo Square in Buea, injuring ten civilians. In Chomba, four people were arrested by government forces; two weeks larter, their corpses were discovered inside an abandoned building.
- On 22 December, Cameroonian soldiers killed two civilian teenagers and injured one in Ngongham, Bamenda.
- On 26 December, following fighting in Tinto, separatist generals Bessong Eugene (who died shortly after) and Mbu Princely Tabe contacted Médecins Sans Frontières (MSF) and requested they treat wounded fighters. The MSF sent an ambulance, but it was intercepted by the Cameroonian military, which arrested two MSF staff. They were released on 28 December.
