= Bouba Dobekreo =

Cameroonian general

- Born: 14 February 1958 (age 68); Menoua, West Region, French Cameroon (now Cameroon)
- Military career
- Allegiance: Cameroon
- Branch: Rapid Intervention Battalion (1983-2015); Multinational Joint Task Force (2015-present)
- Rank: Brigadier General
- Unit: 5th Joint Military Region (2013, 2022-present)
- Conflicts: Boko Haram insurgency Anglophone Crisis: Battle of Bambui

Bouba Dobekreo is a Cameroonian general known for commanding Cameroonian forces in the Boko Haram insurgency and the Anglophone Crisis.

== Biography ==
Dobekreo was born on 14 February 1958 in Menoua, West Region, French Cameroon. He was admitted to the University of Yaoundé to study law and economics.

Dobekreo graduated from the Yaounde Military School in 1983, subsequently attending several military academies across the world. His first military command was as section chief of the 222nd Combat Company based in Bafoussam. Much of Dobekreo's military career has been in the Rapid Intervention Battalion (BIR). He was appointed as the second-in-command of the 3rd BIR in 2005, and then as commander of the 2nd BIR in 2009. Between 2009 and 2010, Dobekreo commanded the 62nd Motorized Infantry Battalion based in Nkambé at the rank of colonel. He then led the BIR Training Center in Koutaba, leaving the position in 2015. In 2013, Dobekreo commanded the 5th Joint Military Region based in Bamenda.

On 14 August 2015, Dobekreo was appointed as the commander of the 1st Sector of the Multinational Joint Task Force (MNJTF). A day prior to his appointment, he was promoted to Brigadier General. In the MNJTF, Dobekreo was known as an extremely successful commander. In April 2016, Dobekreo led an operation within the MNJTF that freed 2,000 hostages in the Lake Chad area. That October, Dobekreo lauded Nigerien forces within the MNJTF for their success against Boko Haram. In August 2022, Dobekreo received medals from MNJTF officials for participating and commanding Operation Integrite du Lac against Boko Haram in Lake Chad. ActuCameroun stated that Dobekreo had killed over 800 Boko Haram fighters during his time as commander.

In July 2022, Dobekreo was appointed again as the commander of the 5th Joint Military Region to combat the Anglophone Crisis. Cameroonian president Paul Biya and Minister of Defense Joseph Beti Assomo believed that Dobekreo's appointment to the area would help combat the Red Dragons. Ambazonian separatists claimed to have killed Dobekreo in February 2019 in Lebialem, but this turned out to be disproven. Dobekreo had also conducted anti-poaching operations in Ndjidda, northern Cameroon, along with operations against Central African rebel groups. He appeared at the National Day celebration on 20 May 2023, in Yaounde.
