= Black Weekend =

Black Weekend may refer to:

- Black weekends in Formula One:
  - 1960 Belgian Grand Prix's fatal accidents, on Sunday 19 June 1960
  - 1994 San Marino Grand Prix's fatal accidents, on Sunday 1 May 1994
- The days of mourning before the state funeral of John F. Kennedy, on Saturday 23 and Sunday 24 November 1963
- Sunday 17 March 1985, before the Langa massacre, in South Africa, during the apartheid era
- A Black Weekend in the Anglophone regions of Cameroon, in mid-November 2021, during the Anglophone Crisis
- Black Weekend, the name given by former Mao Zedong's secretary Li Rui to the Tiananmen Massacre, on Sunday 4 June 1989
- 黒い週末, "Black Weekend", a song by the Japanese female idol group Momoiro Clover Z
