= Battle of Bambui =

2022 military engagement

- Part of Anglophone Crisis
| Date | 31 July 2022 |
| Location | Bambui, Cameroon |
| Result | Cameroonian victory |

Belligerents
| Cameroon | Ambazonia |

Commanders and leaders
| Bouba Dobekreo | "General Rasta" (executed) "Colonel John" (executed) |

Casualties and losses
| 11 injured (per Cameroon) | 15 killed (per Cameroon) |

Between 28 and 31 July 2022, Cameroonian forces launched a localized offensive into the Ambazonian-controlled town of Bambui, in Northwest Region, Cameroon, sparking clashes with the separatist Ambazonia Defence Forces.

== Prelude ==
The Anglophone Crisis began in 2017, when English-speaking people in the northwestern and southwestern regions of Cameroon declared independence due to allegations of persecution by the French-speaking Cameroonian government. Originally beginning as a low-level insurgency, the Cameroonian government established control over the major cities while the Ambazonian rebels controlled much of the countryside and a few villages by 2020. By 2022, both sides regularly launched raids on the territories of one another. In July 2022, tensions flared up in the Northwest Region near the regional capital of Bamenda after Cameroonian troops killed the commander of the pro-Ambazonian Red Dragons.

== Battle ==
On 28 July, Cameroonian media stated that Cameroonian forces were preparing an incursion into Northwest Cameroon. A day later, Cameroonian forces passed through the cities of Enyo, Ewai, and Bossom. While passing through Bambui on 31 July, elements of the Cameroonian Tubah Gendarmerie Brigade and Special Gendarmes Forces ambushed a group of Ambazonian fighters, sparking a firefight. According to Cameroonian media, fifteen Ambazonian fighters were killed in the clash, while eleven Cameroonian soldiers were injured. The operation was planned by Cameroonian general Bouba Dobekreo.

Two Ambazonian commanders, General Rasta, also known as Roy Angafor Asenjo, and Colonel John, were captured. The Centre for Human Rights and Democracy in Africa stated that General Rasta and Colonel John were both tortured before their deaths, and were extrajudicially killed.
