= Lekeaka Oliver =

Ambazonian separatist commander (1968–2022)

- Lekeaka Oliver c. 2019
- Born: December 1968
- Died: 12 July 2022 (aged 53); Menji, Cameroon
- Military career
- Allegiance: Ambazonia
- Branch: Red Dragon
- Service years: 2017–2022
- Rank: Field marshal (Note: Oliver was known as "Field Marshal" both in the media and among fellow separatists. This rank, which became not only his claimed rank but also his nickname, is usually a very senior rank reserved for five-star generals with extraordinary wartime achievements. Given the nature of the Ambazonian separatist guerillas (see list of militant groups), with his own Red Dragon militia having an estimated 200 fighters as of May 2019, this is not a rank that anyone in any modern national armed forces would be appointed to mere two years into their military service.); Self-proclaimed Paramount Ruler of Lebialem
- Nickname: "King of Ambazonia"
- Conflicts: Anglophone Crisis

Lekeaka Oliver, (Note: While one source claims that his real name was Leke Olivier Fongunueh, spelling varies widely in the media.) popularly known as Field Marshall, was a Cameroonian army soldier and later an Ambazonian separatist commander and the leader of the Red Dragon militia. His armed group is part of the loosely-structured Ambazonia Self-Defence Council, and is loyal to the Interim Government of Ambazonia. The Red Dragon is mainly active in Lebialem Division, Southwest Region. Oliver was the brother of Chris Anu, former Secretary for Communications of the Interim Government. Throughout his time as a separatist leader, Cameroonian forces erroneously reported that he had been killed three times. He was killed on 12 July 2022, though it remains unclear whether he was killed by Cameroonian forces or in an incident of separatist infighting.

== Biography ==
=== Early life and insurgency ===
Oliver was born to Grace Mafuatem in Azi in December 1968. According to relatives, he was an "obedient boy", but did not complete school due to poor grades. Oliver eventually went on to join the Cameroonian army, becoming part of the elite Rapid Intervention Brigade (BIR). In contrast, his brother Chris Anu started to work as a computer engineer in the United States.

With the outbreak of the Anglophone Crisis in September 2017, Oliver deserted his position in the army and joined the separatist side, being the first militant to attack military positions in the Southwest Region. A capable commander, he eventually became the most powerful warlord in the Lebialem Division. Owing partly to the topography of Lebialem, the division became a key battleground of the war, with the Cameroon Armed Forces facing a tough fight against the separatists there. As a result, Oliver became a prominent general on the separatist side as well as a prioritized target by Cameroon. Journal du Cameroun Nana Kamsukom journalist described him as the Cameroonian army's bête noire. His brother also joined the separatists as spokesperson and political coordinator.

On December 31, 2018, Cameroon claimed to have killed Oliver. These reports were proven false when Oliver appeared in a video a week later. In August 2019, his mother and sister were arrested in Yaoundé. The authorities claimed that they had hidden away ransom money made by the Red Dragon militia from taking hostages. The lawyers claimed that they had lost contact with Oliver. The commander also stated that the government had imprisoned his best friend and his wife. Oliver's mother was released in November 20, while his sister was transferred to Kondengui Central Prison.

Lekeaka Oliver, enthroned as self-proclaimed monarch of Lebialem

On October 1, 2019, having chased out the traditional rulers of Lebialem, Oliver declared himself "Paramount Ruler" or "King" of Lebialem, and even posed for a photo dressed in clothing akin to that worn by local traditional rulers. This act caused outrage both among Cameroonian loyalists as well as other rebels, with one Ambazonian spokesman, Tapang Ivo Tanku, calling it an "excessive abuse of power and the rape of culture". Oliver's self-proclamation as monarch also prompted Cameroonian raids into the area to capture or kill him. While unsuccessful in finding Oliver, the raids led to casualties on both sides. When the Ambazonian leadership crisis erupted in the same year, Oliver's militia pledged loyalty to Samuel Ikome Sako's Interim Government. At some point, Oliver rose to leader of the entire Ambazonia Self-Defence Council (by then better known as "Ambazonia Restoration Forces"). At the peak of his power, the Red Dragon militia numbered hundreds of members. Oliver even presented his group as being the largest active separatist militia. The New Humanitarian researcher R. Maxwell Bone described him as the "main military asset" of the Sako loyalists. However, as conflicts among the rebels grew, Oliver was increasingly criticized by anti-Sako separatists such as the prominent activist Mark Bareta.

=== Decline of the Red Dragons, and death ===
In January 2022, the Ambazonia Restoration Forces began to fracture as conflicts erupted among its members. Several commanders of the umbrella group, including General No Pity and General Mad Dog, started to clash with other members of the coalition. The internal struggles further escalated in February 2022, as the Interim Government splintered when its leader Samuel Ikome Sako was impeached. General Mad Dog subsequently began attacking the forces of Oliver. (Note: Oliver's brother Chris Anu joined the anti-Sako faction led by Marianta Njomia.) In the following weeks, the position of the Red Dragons greatly declined, with the group being reduced to about 30 fighters according to Bareta News or just a "few supporters" according to Journal du Cameroun. At some point, Oliver was reportedly wounded in combat, and went into hiding in Nigeria or Lebialem.

Cameroonian security forces including the BIR reportedly located Oliver in Menji, and organized a raid on 12 July 2022. According to the Cameroonian government, Oliver and one of his guards were killed during the attack, while the remaining Red Dragons fled. Photos of a corpse were subsequently published which appeared to match Oliver. News websites Cameroun Web and Cameroon Info cautioned that Oliver had been declared dead three times before this raid, making some separatists question his death. However, separatists later confirmed his death; according to his brother Chris Anu, Oliver was killed by an insider who had then tipped off Cameroonian forces about the location of the corpse. The Cameroonian government subsequently displayed Oliver's corpse to the public to "deter the rebels and warn youth against joining their cause".
