= Ambazonia Restoration Army =

Ambazonian separatist militia

- Seal of the Ambazonia Restoration Army

Leadership
- Chief: Paxson Agbor

Related articles
- History: Anglophone Crisis

The Ambazonia Restoration Army (ARA) is an Ambazonian separatist militia. It is affiliated with the Interim Government of Ambazonia, and is part of the Ambazonia Self-Defence Council.

The ARA is reportedly led by Paxson Agbor, a former police officer.

== See also ==
- Communes of Cameroon
