= Wum prison break =

Prison break in Cameroon

- Part of the Anglophone Crisis
Date	25 September 2018
Location	Wum, Northwest Region
Result	Ambazonian victory

Belligerents
Cameroon	Ambazonia

Units involved
N/A	Tigers of Ambazonia

Strength
Prison guards	Unknown

The Wum prison break took place on 25 September 2018, when Ambazonian separatists attacked a prison in Wum, Northwest Region, Cameroon. The attack was the third of its kind since the start of the Anglophone Crisis, and was connected with separatist efforts to block the 2018 Cameroonian presidential election from being held in the territory of former Southern Cameroons.

== Prison break ==
The attack was reported to have taken place at approximately 10pm, although leader of the Tigers of Ambazonia (TTA) Nchia Martin Achuo stated that it took place at 4am. Achuo claimed that the purpose of the attack was to set free innocent people who had recently been arrested.

The separatist fighters were reported to have been heavily armed, and managed to overwhelm the prison guards after a heavy shootout. Following the attack, the Cameroonian government confirmed that around 100 prisoners had escaped. The TTA claimed that the exact number was 106. A day later, another source adjusted the number to 117.

== Aftermath ==
Following the prison break, Cameroon launched a military crackdown in the area, as well as a man-hunt across Menchum to capture the fugitives. According to the military, 30 of the inmates were re-arrested within a day. To prevent future prison breaks, Cameroon also accelerated its effort of moving inmates from smaller prisons to the central prison of Bamenda.
