= General No Pity =

- Born: Clement Mbashie; Bambalang, Cameroon
- Died: c. May 2023
- Relatives: Sylvester Mbashie (brother)
- Military career
- Allegiance: Ambazonia
- Branch: Ambazonia Restoration Forces (Note: The Ambazonia Restoration Forces / Self-Defence Council were aligned with the Interim Government of Ambazonia until early 2022. In February 2022, the Interim Government fractured and its forces began to fight each other. General No Pity appears to have joined those elements of the Ambazonia Restoration Forces that oppose Samuel Ikome Sako, former Interim Government leader.); Ambazonia Defence Forces (possibly, from 2022)
- Service years: c. 2019 – 2023
- Rank: "General" "Field Marshal" (less commonly used)
- Commands: Bambalang Marine Forces; Bui Unity Warriors; Ambazonia Revolutionary Guards
- Conflicts: Anglophone Crisis: Operation Bui Clean (WIA); September 2021 Bamessing ambush

Clement Mbashie (died c. May 2023), better known by his nom de guerre "General No Pity", was an Ambazonian separatist who commanded several militant groups, most importantly the Bambalang Marine Forces and Bui Unity Warriors, in the Anglophone Crisis.

== Biography ==
=== Early life and taking up arms ===
Clement Mbashie was an Anglophone Cameroonian born in Bambalang. In the late 2000s, he studied at the Cameroon College of Arts, Science and Technology Bambili, a secondary school in Mezam. He was forced to work part-time to pay for his education. After a first failure to achieve GCE Ordinary Level, he relocated to Buea where he became a doughnut and yogurt vendor while taking evening classes. His situation began to change as Buea became affected by the 2016–17 Cameroonian protests and the accompanying economic unrest, as Mbashie was laid off by his employer. By this point, he also had fathered a son. After a period of unemployement, Mbashie opted to instead work as a motorbike taxi driver, a profession he practiced in the time leading up to and during the early stages of the Anglophone Crisis, an open separatist rebellion in western Cameroon.

On 31 July 2018, the mayor of Buea banned all motorcycling within the city due to security reasons. Mbashie was among the members of the taxi driver trade union who unsuccessfully protested against this decision. Without a job and perspectives, as well as angered over the negative impact of the Cameroonian state on his life, Mbashie returned to Bambalang and joined the separatist movement. By 2019, he served alongside the Seven Karta, a rebel group associated with the Ambazonia Self-Defence Council. He was not a full member of the militia, however, spending time with the Seven Karta to learn how to operate as a guerrilla. His brother, Sylvester Mbashie, alias "Shina Rambo", also joined the rebellion at one point.

=== Rebel commander ===
At some point before or during 2020, he became the leader of the Bambalang Marine Forces and adopted his nom de guerre. Researcher Joseph Nkwain categorized his pseudonym as typical for the Ambazonian rebel commanders, as it was useful in evoking respect and fear. The Bambalang Marine Forces originated and initially mainly operated in Ngo-Ketunjia. General No Pity gained prominence as one of the Ambazonian military leaders who are most "wanted" by the Cameroonian security forces, as his militia quickly became rather successful as well as increasingly brutal. Under his command, the Bambalang Marines burnt down the residence of the prefect of Balikumbat and beheaded several Cameroonian soldiers. In March 2020, it was falsely reported that General No Pity had been killed in combat near Bamali.

Departments where forces loyal to General No Pity are known to have operated as of 2021.

In 2021, General No Pity expanded his reach and increased his attacks, with his troops operating in Bambalang, Bui, Boyo, and Mezam. Under his leadership, the militia carried out two successful raids into West Region throughout 2021. He also became part of the Ambazonia Restoration Forces (formerly the Ambazonia Self-Defence Council) which are loyal to the Interim Government of Ambazonia, one of the factions involved in the Ambazonian leadership crisis. Around mid-2021, his forces fought against Operation Bui Clean; this government offensive resulted in the demise of several separatist commanders. General No Pity was wounded, but survived the operation.

In September of that year, General No Pity and the Bambalang Marine Forces cooperated with the Jaguars of Bamessing to ambush a military convoy. The operation resulted in the death of 15 Cameroonian soldiers, the destruction of two armoured vehicles, and the capture of several guns by the rebels. General No Pity celebrated the success by filming himself and his fighters next to the burning vehicles. This ambush received national attention in Cameroon, and led to the government intensifying their manhunt for him. In the month following the Bamessing attack, he called on the United Nations to take notice of the Anglophone Crisis in an audio message. At the time, he was described as leader of the "Ambazonia Revolutionary Guards" as well as chief commander of the Ambazonia Restoration Forces by the Cameroon Intelligence Report.

Meanwhile, the Cameroonian military launched operations to hunt him down, resulting clashes which left several Bambalang Marine Forces members dead. Security forces once again claimed to have killed General No Pity, only for him to resurface in Manyu. (Note: In November 2021, Cameroonian security forces arrested an imposter and bandit who had claimed to be No Pity.) Eventually, Cameroonian security forces arrested Antoinette Kongnso, believed to be the pregnant girlfriend or ex-girlfriend of General No Pity. The separatist militant reportedly responded by kidnapping Fon Yekum Kelvin of Bambalang, and demanding that Kongnso and several of his imprisoned followers be freed in exchange for Kelvin. Kongnso was released on bail in December 2021.

As time went on, General No Pity made more and more incursions into Bui, where he forced several minor separatist factions to unify into the "Bui Unity Warriors". Cooperating with the Ambazonia Defence Forces (ADF), he was even able to convince elements of the Bui Warriors, another rebel group, to break off and join the Bui Unity Warriors. The new formation was officially founded in January 2022 and formally headed by General Mad Dog, and considered part of the ADF, signifying General No Pity's realignment of loyalties. At this point, he was no longer head of the Ambazonia Restoration Forces, a position instead held by Lekeaka Oliver. The leader of the Bui Warriors, "Field Marshal" Insobu, regarded the formation of the Bui Unity Warriors as a threat to his own position, and he responded by attacking No Pity's forces. In the following month, the intra-rebel conflicts further escalated, as the Interim Government of Ambazonia splintered and its former followers began to fight each other. General Mad Dog began attacking Lekeaka Oliver's followers in Kumbo, while General No Pity led the Bui Unity Warriors into battle against the Bui Warriors. His fighters were able to kill Insobu on 8 April 2022. This operation was received with approval by locals, as Insobu had become infamous for kidnapping and abusing civilians.

In June 2022, General No Pity personally led an attack at Njatapon, a border post between Ngo-Ketunjia and the Noun River, killing nine Cameroonian soldiers. In the following month, Lekeaka Oliver was killed. This left General No Pity arguably the most important active Ambazonian militia leader. In early August, General No Pity led an offensive against army camps in Oku. The attack was repelled and the separatist commander reportedly wounded in battle. Several members of his militia were killed; Bareta News went so far as to call this clash No Pity's "Waterloo". Following these events, General No Pity went off the radar for several months. On 28 January 2023, he resurfaced in a video where he said that "three truck loads" of soldiers had attacked his stronghold in Bambalang two days prior, only to be repelled with heavy losses.

In late May 2023, his brother Sylvester Mbashie surrendered to the government. When military officials questioned Sylvester, he reportedly claimed that General No Pity had been killed during a raid on the village of Baba I in Ngo-Ketunjia. According to this account, Sylvester had surrendered because he had been defeated by Njibongwe Derick (General No Pity's witch doctor) in the following succession struggle over command of the Bambalang Marine Forces. In July 2023, Le Jour journalist Haman Mana and Ngo-Ketunjia prefect Quetong Anderson Kongeh supported the claim that General No Pity had been killed.

General No Pity was ultimately succeeded as leader of the Bambalang Marine Forces and Bui Unity Warriors by Henry Njimbogwe ("General No Mercy"); the latter was killed on 3 July 2026.
