= Egbekaw massacre =

Separatist mass murder in Cameroon

Coordinates: 5°45′46″N 9°18′29″E

- Location: Egbekaw, Mamfe, Manyu, Southwest Cameroon
- Date: 6 November 2023
- Attack type: Arson, mass shooting
- Deaths: 30+
- Injuries: Many
- Perpetrator: Tigers of Ambazonia
- Motive: Reprisal attack for the death of an Ambazonian separatist the day prior

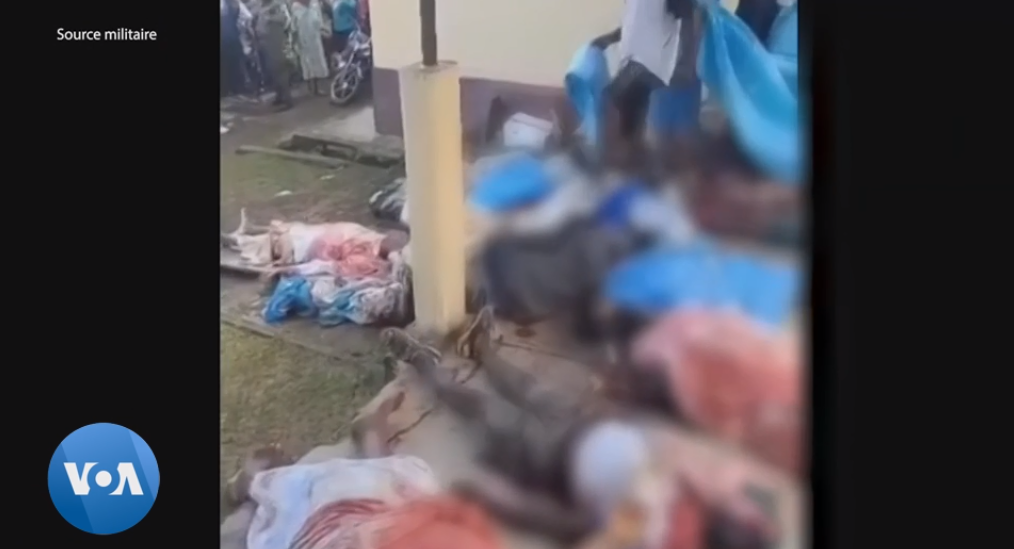
Bodies of Egbekaw massacre victims

On 6 November 2023, the Tigers of Ambazonia (also called "Tigers of Manyu") carried out a massacre in Egbekaw, Mamfe, Southwest Region, Cameroon. Over thirty people were killed, mostly Boki residents.

== Background ==
Anglophone separatists say they are being discriminated against. They want a separate Anglophone state which they call Ambazonia. In 2016, they protested and rioted. In 2017, they began an insurgency in the Northwest and Southwest Regions of Cameroon. On 4 October, two civilians were extrajudicially killed by the Ambazonia Defence Forces, who said that the civilians were Cameroonian spies.

The Boki community in Egbekaw allegedly hired Nigerian mercenaries to hunt down Ambazonian separatists, the local group being Tigers of Ambazonia, and the mercenaries killed one separatist in Egbekaw on 5 November. The Tigers vowed revenge on the Boki community in Egbekaw, warning non-Boki villagers to expel Boki residents.

In Egbekaw, celebrations were planned for Paul Biya's 41st anniversary of ruling the country. Several senior politicians of the Manyu Department were expected to be in attendance.

== Massacre ==
Before dawn on 6 November 2023, the Tigers attacked Egbekaw. Residents stated that the separatists attacked the village around 4am local time, firing on sleeping villagers and torching houses. At least 30 people were killed in the attack, and many more were seriously injured. The Tigers also targeted specific houses where they knew Boki residents resided. By the evening of 6 November many of the burnt bodies were still being counted.

== See also ==
- List of terrorist incidents in 2023
