= Tigers of Ambazonia =

- Logo of the Tigers
- Leaders: Nchia Martin Achuo (also spelled "Ashu"); Chia Martin ("Tiger 1")
- Dates active: 2017 – present
- Country: Cameroon
- Active regions: Manyu and Meme departments, Southwest Cameroon
- Ideology: Ambazonian separatism; Traditionalism; Odeshi
- Size: c. 500 (2019)
- Part of: Ambazonia: Ambazonia Self-Defence Council

The Tigers of Ambazonia (TTA), also known as Manyu Tigers or Tigers of Manyu, are an Ambazonian separatist militia. According to its official website, the Tigers recognize the authority of the Interim Government of Ambazonia. The militia is part of the Ambazonia Self-Defence Council. The Tigers mainly operate in Manyu and Meme departments of Cameroon’s Southwest Region.

== History ==
The Tigers were organized in Manyu in the fall of 2017, with between 10 and 30 initial fighters. It was one of many localized armed groups set up during the early civil war, attacking military checkpoints. According to the pro-separatist Bareta News, the Tigers emerged in response to the murder of Ekabe Nyongo, a traditional chief in Manyu who had voiced support for the separatist movement. A naked and armed mob of Tigers subsequently stormed Nyongo's funeral, captured a Cameroonian soldier present and forced him to denounce the government, after which the rebels declared another separatist the new local chief. On 14 January 2018, the Cameroonian security forces counter-attacked in an attempt to destroy the Tigers, but the operation provoked further local support for the rebels.

In September 2018, the Tigers claimed responsibility for the Wum prison break. At this point, the militia was part of the Ambazonia Self-Defence Council, and claimed to have around 2,000 fighters under its command, though this number could not be verified and was likely an exaggeration. The Tigers also cooperated with the larger Ambazonia Defence Forces and SOCADEF.

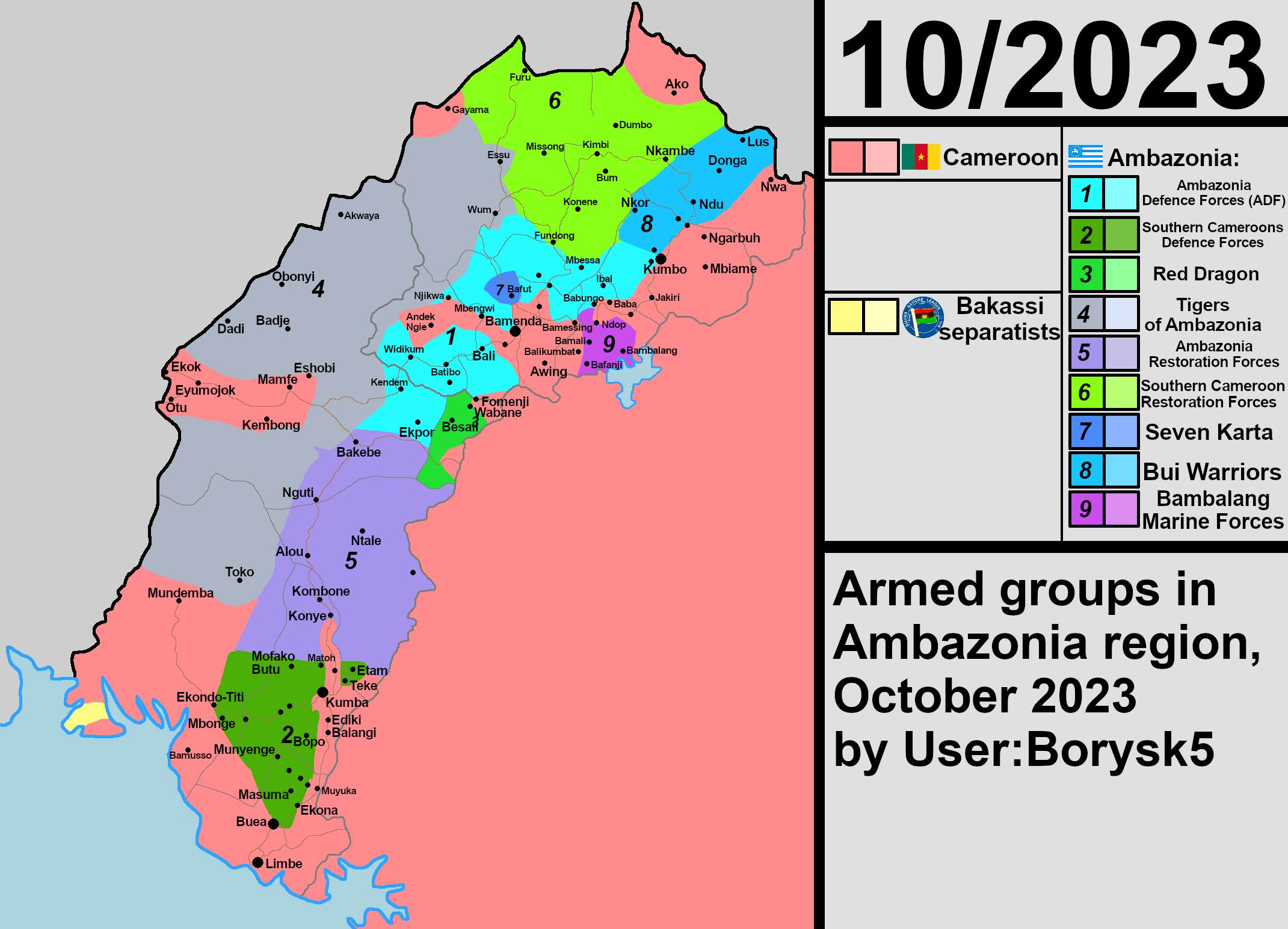
Presence of Ambazonian militant groups, including the Tigers in gray, by 2023.

By 2019, the International Crisis Group estimated that the Tigers included about 500 militants. By 2020, Cameroon Intelligence Report claimed that the Tigers had become infamous among Cameroonian soldiers and controlled the rural areas around Mamfe. The group reportedly maintained many cells in Manyu, and patrolled the area to prevent the spread of the COVID-19 pandemic.

On 6 November 2023, separatist fighters massacred at least 20 civilians in Egbekaw, near Mamfe. Cameroon News Agency attributed the massacre to the Tigers, describing it as a revenge attack due to the locals hiring Nigerian mercenaries who had killed one member of the separatist militia.

== Beliefs ==
The Tigers adhere to militant Ambazonian separatism. In addition, they are inspired to some degree by traditional African religions; the group's name is based on the belief that "some of the Tigers are the ghosts of dead ancestors who have risen from the grave to defend their people". Belief in supernatural protection and influence, called odeshi, is common among Ambazonian militant groups.
