= Shina Rambo =

Nigerian bandit

Oluwasina Oluwagbemiga (born Olusegun Adeshina Adisa Kuye, c. 1958), also known as Shina Rambo is a former bandit and armed robbery kingpin who was active in SouthWest Nigeria in the 1990s.

== Early life ==
Shina Rambo was born as Olusegun Adeshina Adisa Kuye around 1958 in Abeokuta, Ogun State, in southwestern Nigeria. He was reportedly raised in Benin City. Kuye lacked formal schooling.

== Criminal activities ==
In the early 1990s, Shina Rambo became infamous for a string of high-profile armed robberies, primarily in Lagos, Ogun, and other parts of southwest Nigeria. His operations were characterized by cross-border activities, often transporting stolen vehicles from Lagos to Cotonou, Benin. He was also known for employing beautiful women to lure his victims. He was a fetishist and believed in rituals and human sacrifices. Some police officers questioned his very existence, considering him a myth.

== Post-criminal life ==
Kuye later became a pastor after he was released from prison during Olusegun Obasanjo's regime and afterwards he preached the Gospel. In a 2020 interview, he revealed his new identity as Oluwasina Oluwagbemiga and confessed to being the same individual who had once terrorized Lagos and Ogun states.
