= Fongo-Tongo =

Coordinates: 5°31′N 10°00′E

- Commune and town
- Interactive map of Fongo-Tongo
- Country: Cameroon
- Time zone: UTC+1 (WAT)

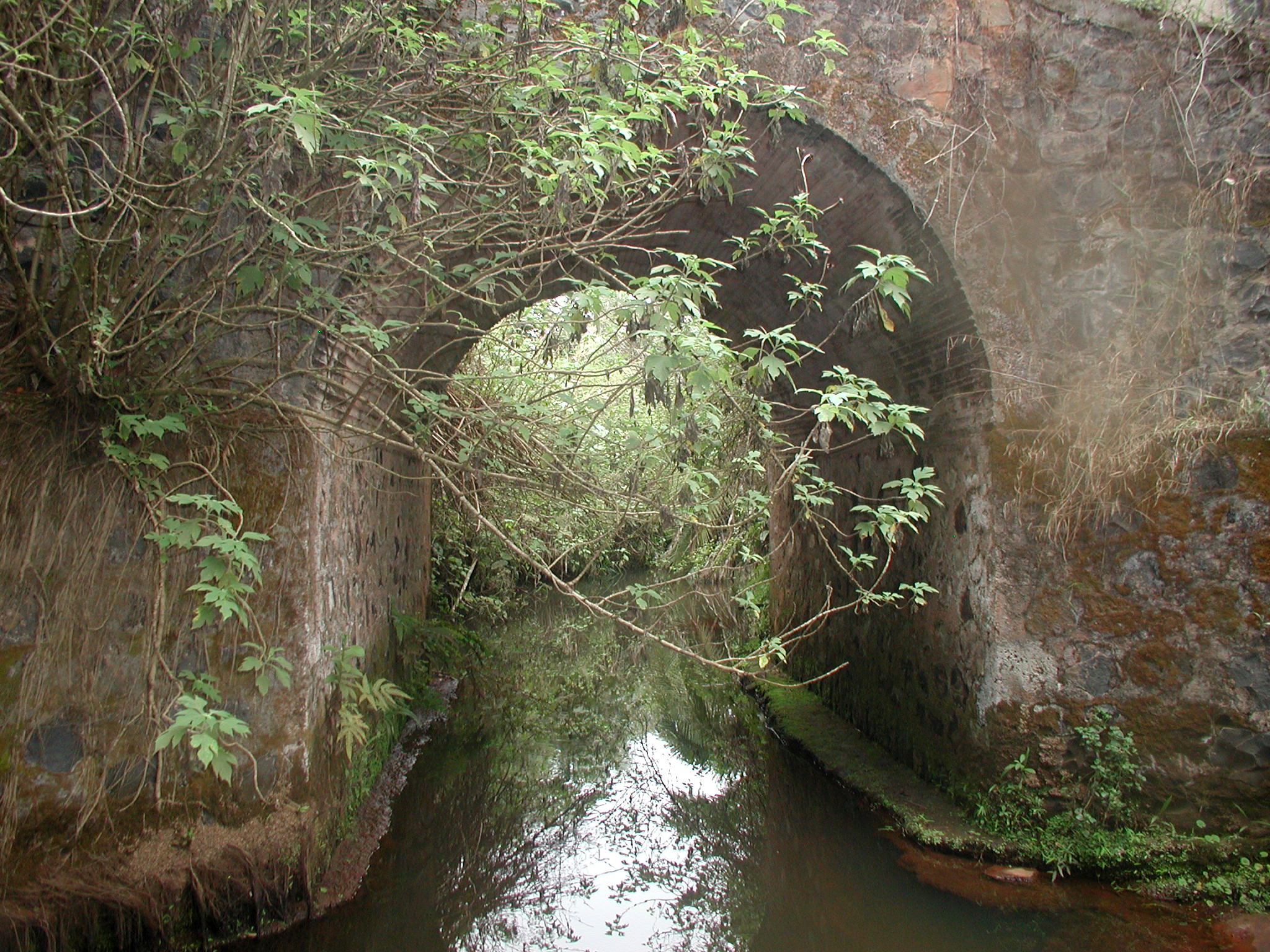
Old bridge in Fongo-Tongo

Fongo-Tongo is a town and commune in Cameroon.

== See also ==
- Communes of Cameroon
