= Akwaya massacre =

2022 mass shootings in Cameroon

- Part of the Anglophone Crisis (alleged)
- Akwaya massacre (Cameroon)
- Location: 6°23′N 9°30′E; Ballin, Manyu Department, Southwest Region, Cameroon
- Date: June 25, 2022
- Attack type: Arson, mass shooting
- Deaths: At least 32
- Perpetrator: Ambazonian rebels (per the government of Cameroon); Other insurgent forces (per Ambazonia); Residents of Mavass (per the Presbyterian Church of Cameroon)

The Akwaya massacre happened on 25 June 2022, when militants killed at least 26 civilians in the village of Ballin in Akwaya commune, Southwest Cameroon.

== Background ==
There had been a long-standing territorial dispute between the villages of Ballin and Mavass, inhabited by the Mesaka and Oliti ethnic groups, respectively. A spokesperson from the Presbyterian Church of Cameroon said that peace talks were being organized, but that representatives from neither of the communities agreed to attend. According to local sources, the massacre was preceded by the killing of Oliti men who had set up control posts in Ballin a few days prior.

== Massacre ==
The attackers set fire to more than fifty houses and attacked the residence of Marin Aka, a local politician who had been attending his brother's funeral. Authorities recovered at least 26 bodies, including five Nigerians, although the estimated death toll was 32. The perpetrators also destroyed a hospital during the massacre.

Cameroonian health authorities were unable to organize an evacuation of the wounded, so villagers had to transport them to the nearest health center themselves. Those with severe injuries were evacuated to Nigeria for treatment. According to the Presbyterian Church of Cameroon, a number died before they reached a Nigerian hospital.

== Perpetrators ==
Government authorities said that the massacre had been committed by Ambazonian insurgents, which the rebels denied and instead suggested it had been committed by Nigerian rebels. The Presbyterian Church of Cameroon reported that the Akwaya massacre was actually related to a land dispute between Ballin and the neighbouring village of Mavass. Local officials said that Mavass had hired Ambazonian separatists to carry out the attack.
