= September 2021 Bamessing ambush =

Separatist ambush during the Anglophone Crisis

- Part of the Anglophone Crisis
Date	September 16, 2021
Location	Near Bamessing, Ngo-Ketunjia
Result	Ambazonian victory

Belligerents
Cameroon	Ambazonia

Commanders and leaders
Unknown	"General No Pity" "General Sagard"

Units involved
6th Rapid Intervention Battalion (BIR)	Bambalang Marine Forces; Jaguars of Bamessing

Casualties and losses
15 killed Two armored vehicles destroyed	None confirmed

On 16 September 2021, two Ambazonian separatist groups, namely the Bambalang Marine Forces and Jaguars of Bamessing, ambushed a military convoy near Bamessing, Ngo-Ketunjia. The ambush was among the deadliest individual separatist attacks during the Anglophone Crisis, and led to the announcement of a "paradigm shift" by Cameroon's Defense Minister Joseph Beti Assomo six days later.

== Background ==
By September 2021, the separatists had acquired anti-tank rockets, probably imported from Nigeria. These weapons were used in a series of attacks, with the first taking place at Kumbo on 12 September.

== The ambush ==
According to Agence Cameroun Presse, the ambush was jointly organized by two separatist militias, namely the Bambalang Marine Forces led by "General No Pity" and the Jaguars of Bamessing commanded by "General Sagard". The attack targeted a convoy of the 6th Rapid Intervention Battalion which was on a reconnaissance mission. The rebels stopped the convoy using an improvised explosive device next to a hill on a road from Bamessing to Sabga, whereupon they fired anti-tank rockets and destroyed two armored vehicles. The insurgents then targeted the government troops with heavy gunfire. Overall, 15 soldiers were killed in the ambush.

Following the ambush, the separatist fighters including "General No Pity" filmed themselves celebrating next to the burning vehicles before leaving with captured weapons. Based on the footage, Agence Cameroun Presse journalist Ariane Foguem argued that rebels had also taken uniforms from the convoy. The insurgents went on to post videos on social media which showed them posing with the naked corpses of the killed soldiers. Foguem also claimed that the rebels had captured some soldiers whom they subsequently tortured to death.

== Aftermath ==
After the attack, Cameroonian forces went to search for the separatists in Babanki and killed at least two civilians. Cameroon's United Socialist Democratic Party, an opposition party, called for a ceasefire between the government and the separatists in response to the ambush, with party president Prince Ekosso stating that the "whole country is bleeding". United People for Social Renovation secretary general Serge Espoir Matomba stated on Facebook that the ambush was a "shameful attack on Cameroon's democracy".

General No Pity was allegedly killed in 2023, although as of May 2024 his death has not been confirmed. General Sagard was killed by Cameroonian forces in May 2024.
