= Fontem =

- Village
- Location in Cameroon
- Coordinates: 5°28′N 9°53′E
- Country: Cameroon
- Region: South West Region
- Department: Lebialem
- Time zone: UTC+1 (WAT)

Fontem is a subdivision in the Lebialem division of Cameroon. Consisting of three Fondoms, Lebang, the biggest, Essoh Etah and Fotabong III. Its headquarters are at Menji, they are located in the South West Region, and are west of Dschang and Bafoussam.

== Culture ==
Fontem and the surrounding areas are home to the Bangwa people (one of the Lebialem tribes).

== Medicine ==
Fontem is the site of Mary Health of Africa Mission Hospital, a 120-bed hospital that also has an extensive outpatient service and runs a dispensary in nearby Fonjumetaw. It specializes in treating infectious tropical conditions, especially malaria, sleeping sickness, TB, typhoid fever, and HIV.

== Education ==
Fontem is home to several primary and secondary schools.

- Government Bilingual High School (GBHS), Fontem
- Our Lady Seat of Wisdom College
- Government high school Fontem
- Government secondary Lekong
- Government secondary school Nwehchen
- Government technical high school Fontem
- Government technical college Fonge
