= Menji =

Coordinates: 5°42′47″N 10°03′54″E

- Commune and town
- Interactive map of Menji
- Country: Cameroon
- Time zone: UTC+1 (WAT)

Menji is a town and capital of the Fontem district in Cameroon. It is also the capital of Lebialem division.

== Geographical information ==
Menji Geographical coordinates	Latitude: 5.71306, Longitude: 10.065 5° 42′ 47″ North, 10° 3′ 54″ East

Menji Climate	Monsoon (Köppen climate classification: Am)

Menji Altitude	2,342 m (7,684 ft)

== See also ==
- Communes of Cameroon
