= Red Dragon (Ambazonian militia) =

- Leader: "Field Marshal" Lekeaka Oliver †
- Dates active: 2017 – present
- Country: Cameroon
- Allegiance: Interim Government of Ambazonia: Sako faction (until 2022); Marianta faction (from 2022)
- Headquarters: Tofala Hill Wildlife Sanctuary
- Active regions: Lebialem, Southwest Cameroon
- Ideology: Ambazonian separatism
- Size: "Hundreds" (at peak)
- Part of: Ambazonia: Ambazonia Self-Defence Council; "Lebialem Defence Force"
- Wars: Anglophone Crisis

Red Dragon is an Ambazonian separatist militia loyal to the Interim Government of Ambazonia, and is part of the Ambazonia Self-Defence Council. It was led by Lekeaka Oliver, and controlled most of Lebialem Division in the Southwest Region, driving away the traditional rulers and local administrators. The group was greatly weakened in 2022, with Oliver being killed.

== History ==
On 31 December 2018, the Cameroonian Army claimed to have killed Field Marshal Lekeaka Oliver in Lebialem. His death was quickly denied by the Interim Government of Ambazonia, as well as by sources within the Cameroonian Army. Oliver resurfaced in a video a week later, proving that reports of his death were indeed false. In March 2019, the Cameroonian Army claimed to have killed "General Ayekeah" of the Red Dragons, as well as two fighters who tried to intervene. However, "General Ayekeah" subsequently reemerged as the leader of another insurgent force, the "Alou Guerilla Fighters".

In October 2019, Lekeaka Oliver declared himself Paramount Ruler of Lebialem, drawing condemnation from traditional rulers of the subdivision. Cameroon subsequently launched raids into Lebialem in a failed attempt to capture or kill Oliver, leading to casualties on both sides. In October 2020, the Cameroonian security forces finally killed "General Ayekeah"; this left the Red Dragon militia under Oliver the dominant rebel group in Lebialem. At this point, journalist Atia T. Azohwi stated that Oliver had succeeded in securing a "territory where his word is law". According to the news site Susa Africa, the Red Dragon had also become part of the "Lebialem Defence Force".

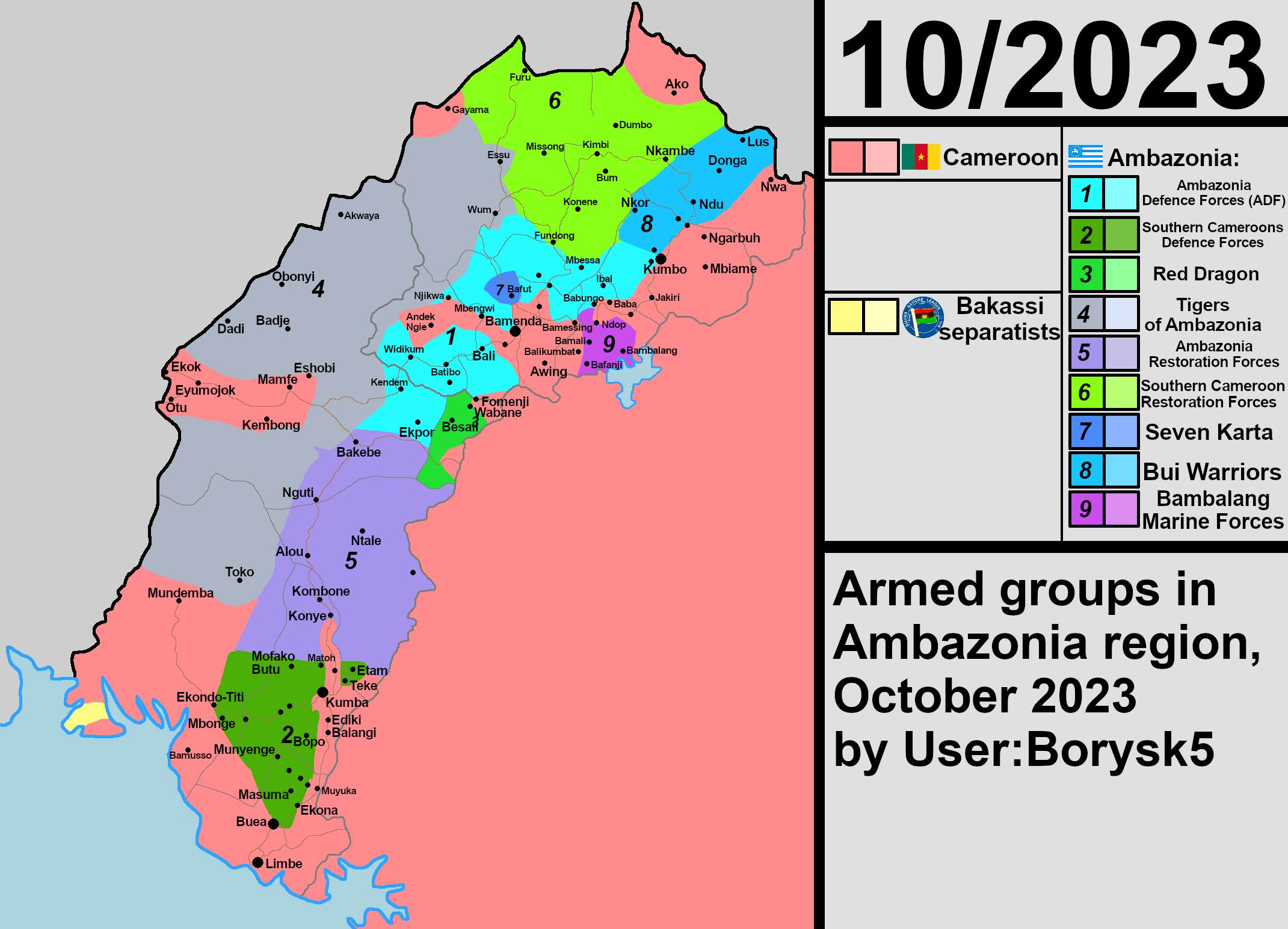
Presence of Ambazonian militant groups, including the Red Dragon, by 2023.

In February 2021, Red Dragon fighters killed at least three traditional rulers in Essoh Attah, Lebialem. In the Ambazonian leadership crisis, the Red Dragons sided with the faction loyal to Samuel Ikome Sako. The Restoration Council, the legislative arm of the Interim Government, split from Sako's faction in early 2022 and later declared that Marianta Njomia had replaced Sako as president. The Red Dragons now appear to be loyal to Marianta's faction.

Cameroonian security forces, including the Rapid Intervention Brigade, reportedly located Oliver in Menji, and organized a raid on 12 July 2022. According to the Cameroonian government, Oliver and one of his guards were killed during the attack, while the remaining Red Dragons fled. The Interim Government of Ambazonia confirmed his death days later, but disputed the events leading to his demise; according to his brother Chris Anu, Oliver was killed by an insider who had then tipped off Cameroonian forces about the location of the corpse. Ambazonia Defence Forces deputy commander Capo Daniel claimed that Oliver had "been replaced by a younger and more vibrant leader" in commanding the Red Dragon militia, though did not name this individual. Regardless, the Red Dragons were greatly weakened by Oliver's death and separatist operations were reduced in Lebialem.

Even though the Red Dragons were believed to be still active in Cameroon as of early 2023, they had reportedly been "completely dislodged" from Lebialem by September of that year. In their place, a new local rebel group, "Team Retina" under "General Massacre", had emerged. In October 2023, the Red Dragons took part in the "Southern Cameroons People's Conference" in Toronto. On 6 February 2024, Red Dragon militants kidnapped Nicholas Nkongho Manchang, the Sub-Prefect of Bamenda's 2nd Arrondissement, and five of his staff members in Ntumbaw. The official was freed a few hours later by security forces.
