= Ndu, Cameroon =

Ndu
- Commune and town
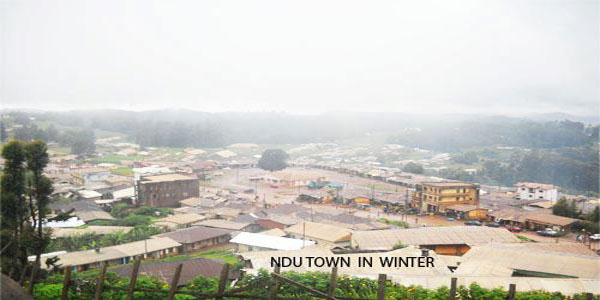

- Location in Cameroon
- Coordinates: 6°25′N 10°49′E
- Country: Cameroon
- Region: Northwest

Population
  - Total: 85,000
- Time zone: UTC+1 (WAT)

Ndu is a town and commune in Donga-Mantung, a division in the Northwest Region of Cameroon. It lies at the northeast edge of the Bamenda Grassfields, on the eastern arc of the Ring Road. It is the highest elevation town in Cameroon.

About 85,000 people live in Ndu commune. Most are Wimbum - the three clans which speak the Limbum language. Ndu commune contains the southeast part of Wimbum-land, including the villages of Talla, Ngarum, Taku, Ntundip, Luh, Ndu-town, Mbipgo, Njimkang, Njilah, Wowo, Sehn, Ntumbaw, Njirong, Ngulu, Nseh Macop, Sinna and Sop. Nkambe Central commune contains the rest of Wimbum-land. Most Wimbum are farmers, raising maize, beans, potatoes, yams, njama-njama, tomatoes, coffee, plantains, and rice. Most soils are rich and the rain is generally sufficient for good crops. At the south end of Ndu commune is the Ndu Tea Estate, the largest tea plantation in Cameroon. Some people raise cattle, horses, goats, sheep, and fowls.

Ndu town is the administrative headquarters of the commune. The town includes a large market, hotels, schools, two hospitals(Government and Baptist Hospitals), a gendarmerie, and the Cameroon Baptist Theological Seminary.

Ndu lies in Cameroon's Western High Plateau. The land is quite hilly, with elevations ranging from 700 m on the Mbaw plain, to cool grassy highlands like Talla at 2,200 m. Important tree species include mahogany, iroko and sapele. The average weather ranges from 7 °C to 20 °C throughout the year.

== Geography ==
=== Climate ===
Situated at 2,057 m (6,749 ft) above sea level, the town of Ndu has a subtropical highland climate (Cwb, according to the Köppen climate classification), with mild temperatures throughout the year. The rainfall is abundant, with a short dry season between December and February.

Climate data for Ndu
Month	Jan	Feb	Mar	Apr	May	Jun	Jul	Aug	Sep	Oct	Nov	Dec	Year
Mean daily maximum °C (°F)	26.1 (79.0)	26.9 (80.4)	25.9 (78.6)	24.1 (75.4)	22.9 (73.2)	21.8 (71.2)	20.7 (69.3)	20.6 (69.1)	21.2 (70.2)	21.5 (70.7)	22.6 (72.7)	24.7 (76.5)	23.3 (73.9)
Daily mean °C (°F)	19.0 (66.2)	20.0 (68.0)	19.9 (67.8)	18.9 (66.0)	18.2 (64.8)	17.3 (63.1)	16.6 (61.9)	16.4 (61.5)	16.7 (62.1)	17.0 (62.6)	17.4 (63.3)	18.1 (64.6)	18.0 (64.3)
Mean daily minimum °C (°F)	12.7 (54.9)	14.1 (57.4)	15.2 (59.4)	15.3 (59.5)	15.0 (59.0)	14.4 (57.9)	13.9 (57.0)	13.8 (56.8)	13.9 (57.0)	14.0 (57.2)	13.4 (56.1)	12.5 (54.5)	14.0 (57.2)
Average rainfall mm (inches)	6 (0.2)	19 (0.7)	87 (3.4)	248 (9.8)	279 (11.0)	302 (11.9)	429 (16.9)	467 (18.4)	408 (16.1)	344 (13.5)	109 (4.3)	9 (0.4)	2,707 (106.6)
Source: Climate-Data.org

== See also ==
- Nkambé for a very brief history of the area.

== Bibliography ==
- Map of Cameroon - Nkambe - NB-32-XVII. Yaounde: National Geographic Centre. 1983.
- Mulutakwi, Achiri Robert (2011). "Cameroon Tea Experience" (PDF).
- "Ndu". United Councils and Cities of Cameroon.
- "Nkambe". United Councils and Cities of Cameroon. Contains a map of the communes in Donga-Mantung.
- "Village Dictionary of Donga-Mantung" (PDF). Office de la Recherche Scientifique et Technique Outre-Mer, United Republic of Cameroon. March 1973. (Online map (1973) at page 41.)
