= Babadjou =

Coordinates: 5°40′N 10°12′E

- Commune and town
- Interactive map of Babadjou
- Country: Cameroon
- Time zone: UTC+1 (WAT)

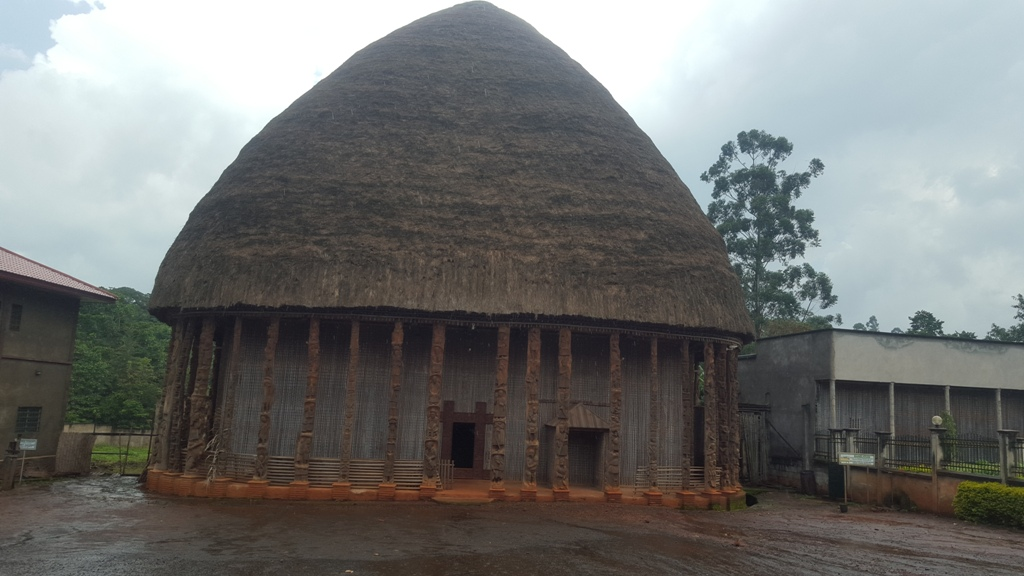
A hut at Bandjoun palace

Babadjou is a town and commune in Cameroon.

== See also ==
- Communes of Cameroon
