= Akwaya =

Coordinates: 6°22′N 9°32′E

- Commune and town
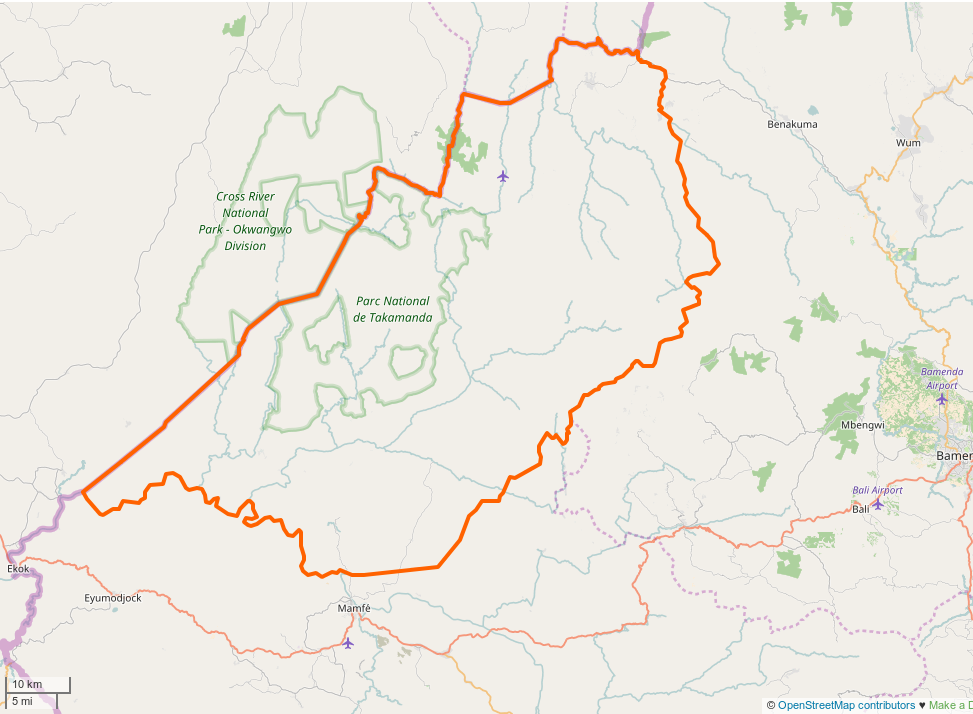
- Akwaya, Cameroon: city boundaries
- Country: Cameroon
- Region: Southwest
- Department: Manyu

Population (2005)
  - Total: 85,914
- Time zone: UTC+1 (WAT)

Akwaya is a town and commune in the Manyu Department, Southwest Region of Cameroon. As of 2005 census, it had a population of 85,914.

In 2022, at least 26 civilians were killed in a massacre.

== See also ==
- Communes of Cameroon
