= Seven Karta =

- Founded: 2017/2018

Leadership
- Chief of Defence: "General Alhaji" † "General Peace Plant" †

Related articles
- History: Anglophone Crisis

Seven Karta is an Ambazonian separatist militia that is part of the Ambazonia Self-Defence Council.

The militia operates in Bafut, Northwest Region. It was founded by taxi operators who lost their livelihood due to the Anglophone Crisis. Its name has two meanings; "seven" refers to seven legendary men who fought against the German Empire in the Bafut Wars, while "karta" is a cloth worn by the locals.

In an overnight mission on March 22, 2019, the group set up concrete walls on the Bafut-Bamenda road, in an attempt to prevent Cameroonian soldiers from moving into Bafut in vehicles.

In April 2020, the Cameroonian military launched Operation Free Bafut against Seven Karta. The offensive resulted in the alleged killing of General Alhaji and General Peace Plant, as well as 13 of their fighters. The militia also lost bases, weapons and equipment.

In December 2022, Cameroonian forces killed a Seven Karta commander known as "One Blood" in Bafut, and displayed his corpse in public.
