= Lebialem =

Department in Southwest Province in Cameroon

- Department
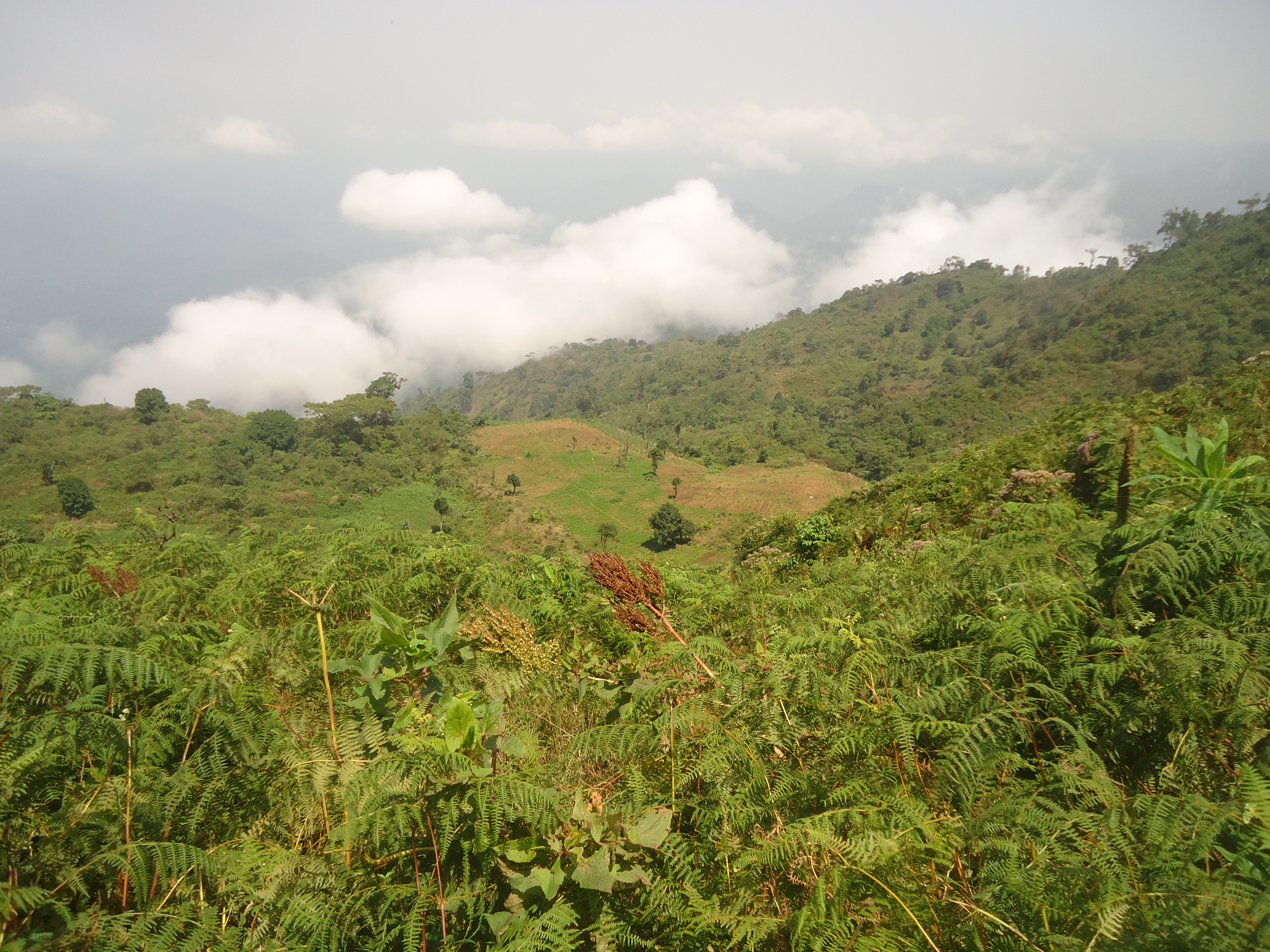
- Natural landscape, Lebialem

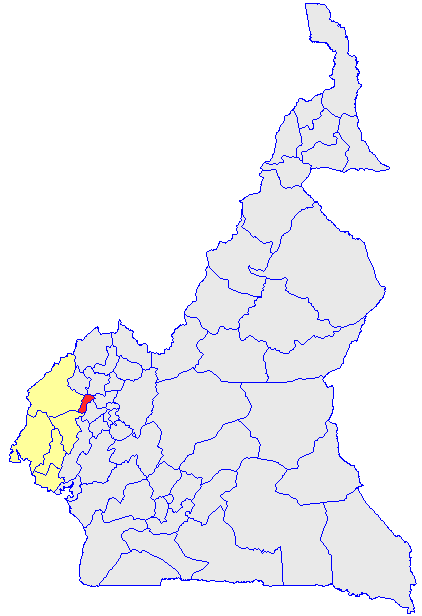
- Department location in Cameroon

- Location within Cameroon Location within Africa
- Coordinates: 5°42′47″N 10°03′54″E
- Country: Cameroon
- Province: Southwest Province
- Capital: Menji

Area
  - Total: 617 km^{2} (238 sq mi)

Population (2005)
  - Total: 113,736
  - Density: 184/km^{2} (477/sq mi)
- Time zone: UTC+1 (WAT)

Lebialem is a department of Southwest Region in Cameroon. The Division covers an area of 617 km^{2} and as of 2005 had a total population of 113,736. The capital of the department lies at Menji. Lebialem got its name from the Lebialem Falls, a twin water fall, which means "a hill from which water drops". The Division is dominated by two ethnic groups, the Mundani to the north and the Bangwa to the south (ba meaning people of), though other ethnic groups exists, the makeup a minority, example the Mbo, Banyangi and Bamiléké.

== Subdivisions ==
The department is divided administratively into 3 districts and in turn into 17 villages or Fondoms.

=== Communes ===
- Fongo-Tongo

District	Capital	Area (km^{2})
Alou	Alou	153
Mundaniland	Wabane	252
Fontem	Menji	237

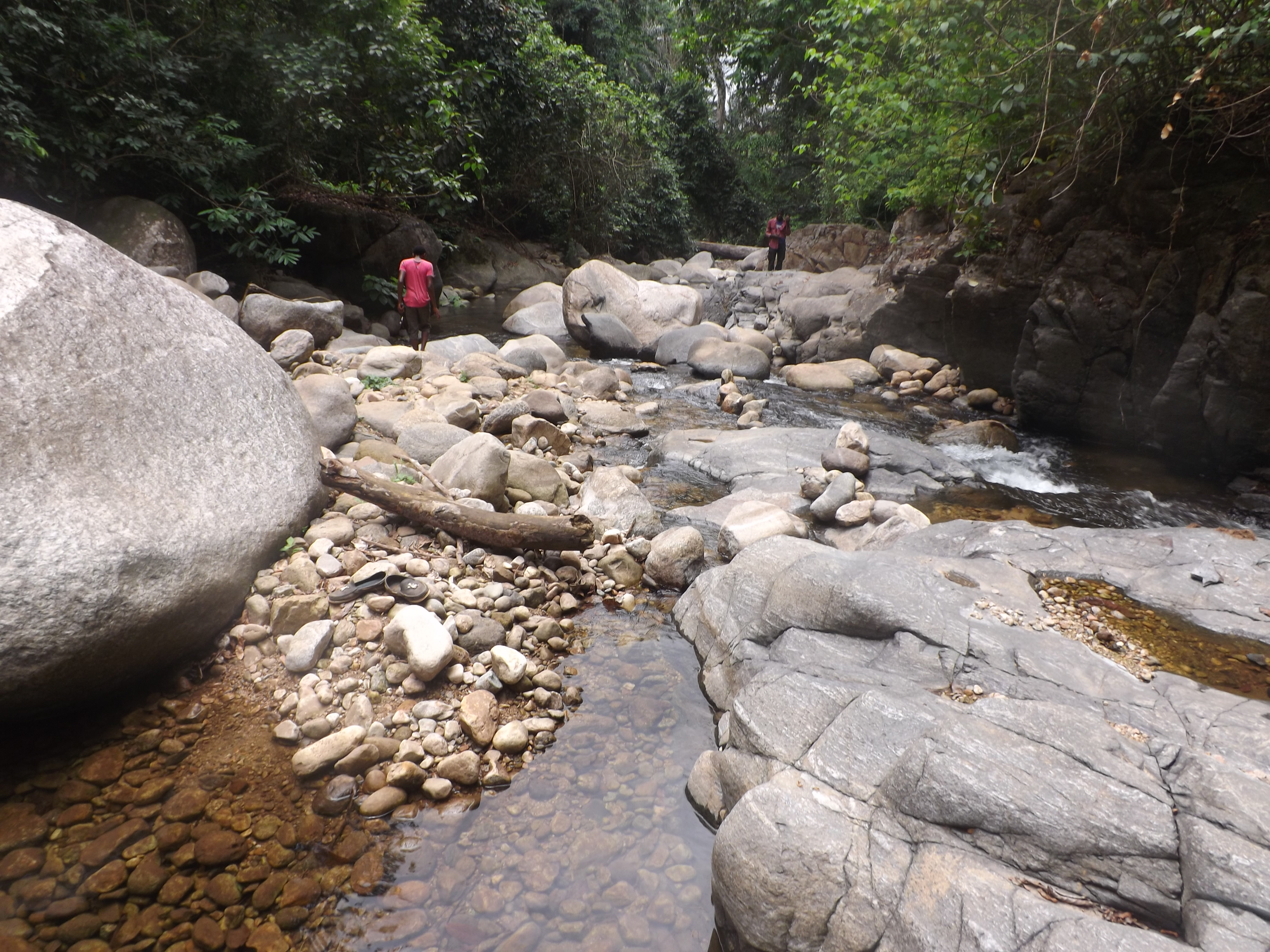
Fossimondi

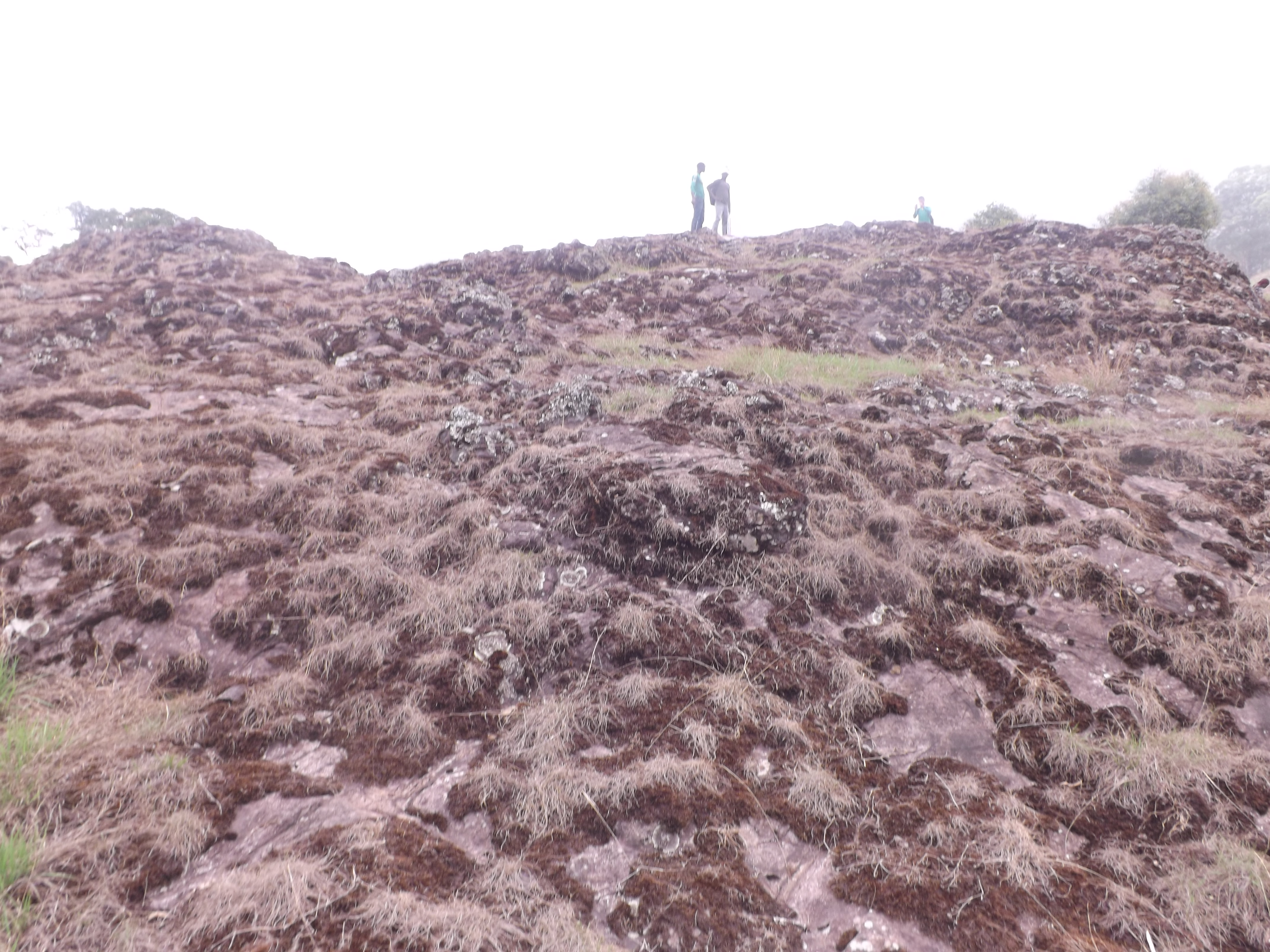
Volcanic terrain, Mvock

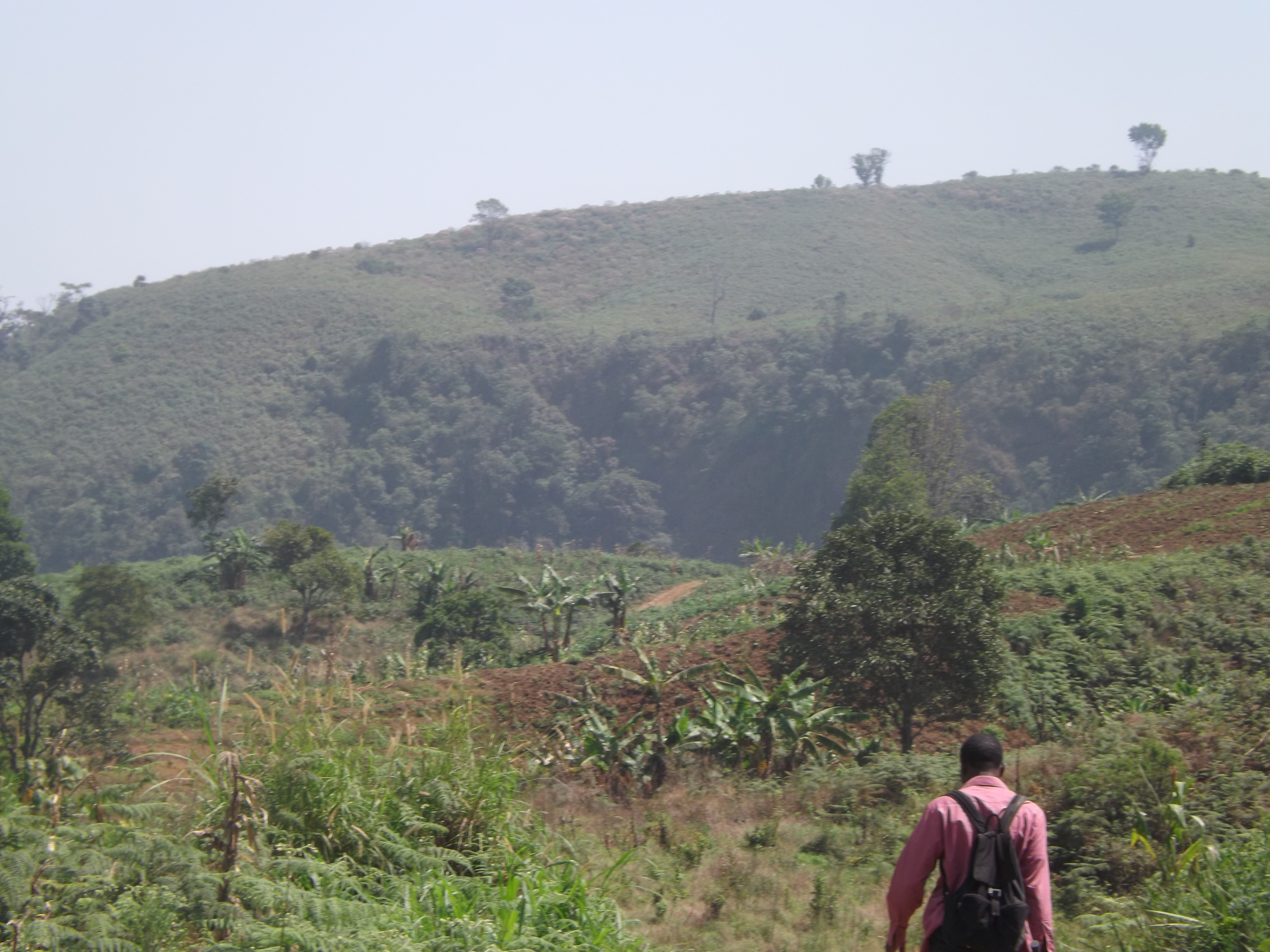
Corn Farm

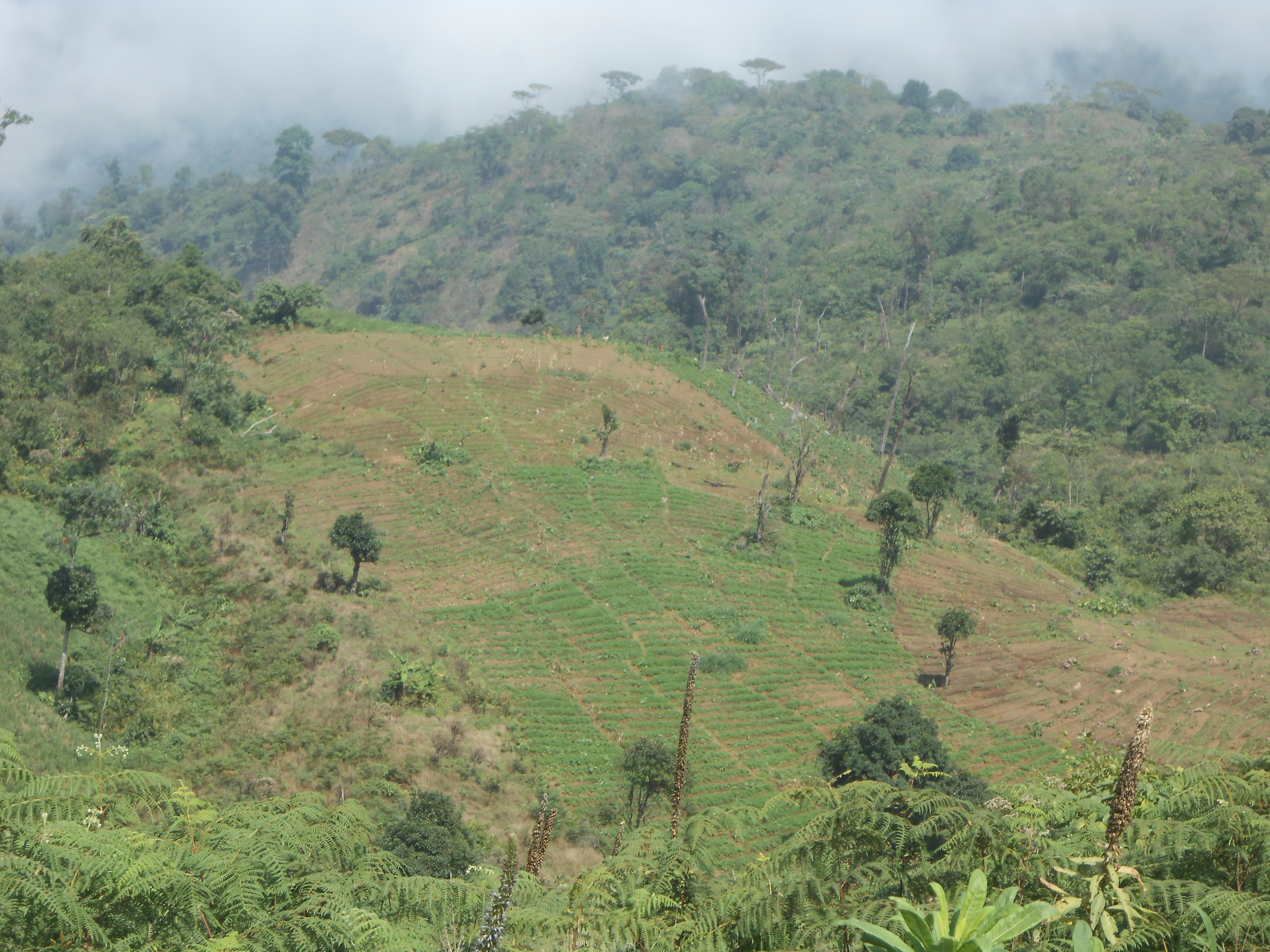
Farm space
