= Samuel Wazizi =

Cameroonian journalist

- Born: Cameroon
- Citizenship: Cameroon
- Occupation: Broadcasting Journalist

Samuel Wazizi (legal name Samuel Ajiekah Abuwe), is a Cameroonian broadcast journalist in Buea, who died in military detention after he was arrested in August 2019 for covering the Anglophone crisis.

== Career ==
He was a cameraman and presenter of a show at Chillen Music Television, a private English-language regional channel.

== Arrest ==
Wazizi was arrested by the 31st Motorized Infantry Battalion (BIM) in Buea on August 2, 2019. He was suspected of collaborating with secessionists and terrorists. He is accused of collaborating and suspected of giving information to separatists. He was held incommunicado and eventually transported to Yaoundé.

== Death ==
Suspicions arose when, despite the fact that he was officially in custody, he failed to appear at a May 28, 2020, court hearing. Since his disappearance ten months before, his relatives had had no news of him.

On June 2, 2020, Cédrick Noufele of Equinoxe Television declared "Following the journalist's secret arrest and the complete lack of news, Equinoxe TV exclusively reports Samuel Wazizi has died. According to sources close to the upper military hierarchy, after his detention in Buea, he underwent mistreatment to the point where his health worsened".
