= PSS Nkwen kidnapping =

2018 mass kidnapping in Nkwen, Cameroon

- Part of the Anglophone Crisis
- Date: 4 November 2018
- Location: Nkwen, near Bamenda, Northwest Region, Cameroon; 5.9965795°N 10.1612954°E
- Outcome: Kidnappers release all students without ransom on 7 November and the staff members on 12 November
- Deaths: None
- Suspects: Amba Boys (Alleged by the Cameroonian government, denied by Ambazonian separatist groups)

Around 3 a.m. on 4 November 2018, armed men kidnapped 79 students, a principal and three staff members from the Presbyterian Secondary School in Nkwen, a town near Bamenda, Cameroon. All 79 students were released without ransom or prior notification on 7 November, while the principal and the staff members were held for five more days. The circumstances of the incident remained unclear. While the kidnappers identified as "Amba Boys" (a common noun for Ambazonian separatists), separatist groups claimed the incident was a false flag operation staged by the Cameroonian government.

== Background ==
Since 2017, Ambazonian separatists have attacked and burnt down schools across Southern Cameroons. At least 42 schools came under attack between February 2017 and May 2018. Separatists regard schools to be legitimate targets because the French language is taught as a mandatory subject, and have warned parents to keep their children at home for their own safety's sake. Attacks on schools have involved destruction of property and abduction of staff, and the purpose of these attacks is to force schools to shut down.

== Kidnapping ==
According to students who were kidnapped, armed men woke them up at 3 a.m., had them sit down in front of the school, and then made their selection. 79 students, a principal and three staff members were taken into the bush, then marched to Bafut, bypassing numerous security checkpoints that operate in and around Bamenda. The students were between the ages of 11 and 17. The following day, Cameroonian authorities announced that the military would be sent to find and free the students. These searches were unsuccessful.

On 7 November, all 79 students were released, while the principal and three staff members remained under captivity. On 12 November, the remaining captives were released too. Although the Cameroonian authorities had been unable to locate the students, they nevertheless took some credit for the release, claiming the kidnappers gave up due to fears of being surrounded.

== Purpose of the kidnapping ==
According to a Presbyterian minister who was involved in negotiations, no ransom was demanded. The kidnappers wanted the school to close down, as part of the school boycott declared by separatists the year before. Students who were kidnapped said the kidnappers told them to stop going to school, and tasked them with conveying the message to other students. Although the details of the negotiations have not been released, the school was closed following the incident.

According to a spokesperson of the Ambazonia Self-Defence Council, the kidnappers had nothing to do with the separatist cause. Separatists claimed they had sent their own fighters to go search for the students, and alleged that the whole affair was staged by the Cameroonian government to smear the separatists. Commenting on a video that was released by the kidnappers, they claimed to recognize one of the kidnappers as a French-speaking man from Yaoundé.

== See also ==
- List of kidnappings
