= Battle of Batibo =

Part of the Anglophone Crisis in Cameroon

- Part of the Anglophone Crisis
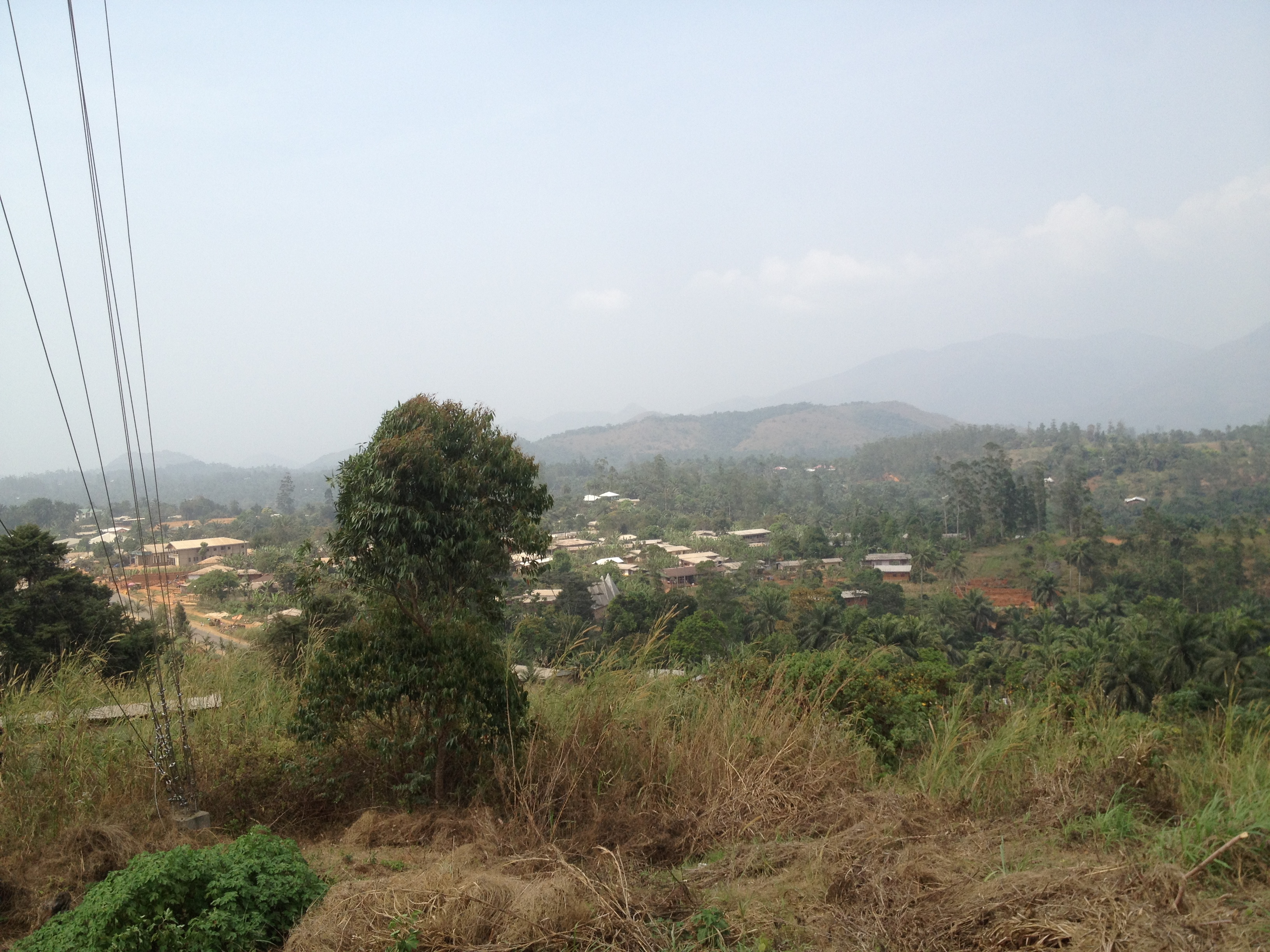
- View of the village of Batibo
Date	3 March 2018
Location	Batibo, Northwest Region
Result	Indecisive

Belligerents
Cameroon	Ambazonia

Casualties and losses
Unknown (~70 according to unconfirmed information)	Unknown ("hundreds" according to unconfirmed information)

The Battle of Batibo occurred on 3 March 2018, when Ambazonian separatists attacked Cameroonian troops on the Bamenda-Batibo Highway, Batibo Subdivision. At the time, it was reportedly the deadliest clash between Cameroonian and Ambazonian forces to date.

== Battle ==
While circumstances of the battle remain unclear, reports claimed that separatist forces ambushed Cameroonian soldiers who were celebrating the recent recapture of most villages in the Batibo Subdivision. While the number of casualties on both sides remained unclear, information circulating on social media claimed that 70 Cameroonian soldiers and "hundreds" of separatists died in the battle.

These casualty figures far eclipse the official figures at the time. Two months after the battle, Cameroon admitted to having lost at least 44 soldiers and policemen since the start of the armed conflict, of whom at least 22 had died between February and May.

== Aftermath ==
The Mayor of Batibo, Frederick Tanjoh, stated that while casualties were high - people on the ground claimed to have seen a military truck transporting a truckload of corpses - no information had been issued by the authorities.

Following the battle, mass arrests took place in villages across the Batibo Subdivision. The villages of Gurissen and Kwana in Upper Bafang, Tinto were burned down by unknown perpetrators, while the villages of Korgwe, Effa, Koroko, Ambo and Angie were completely abandoned. In total, over 4,000 people fled their homes following the battle, including Fons who abandoned their palaces.
