= Kidnappings of John Fru Ndi =

2019 Cameroonian kidnapping

- Part of the Anglophone Crisis
- Fru Ndi in conversation with his kidnappers
- Date: 27 April 2019
- Location: Wainama, Bui, Northwest Region, Cameroon
- Motive: Pressure Fru Ndi to withdraw all SDF legislators from the National Assembly and the Senate
- Outcome: Fru Ndi released after refusing to give in to the kidnappers' demand
- Deaths: None

John Fru Ndi, the leader of the Cameroonian Social Democratic Front was kidnapped twice during the Anglophone Crisis. The first incident was a brief and bloodless, with Fru Ndi being held by Ambazonian separatist fighters for a few hours and then released the same day. The second kidnapping was more dramatic, with gunmen breaking into his home, shooting his bodyguard in the leg and subjecting Fru Ndi to a rough treatment.

== First kidnapping ==
=== Background ===
On 27 April 2019, Fru Ndi travelled to Kumbo to attend the funeral of Joseph Banadzem, the Parliamentary group leader of the SDF. Due to the security situation in the area, the governor of the Northwest Region offered Fru Ndi a military escort to protect against any potential separatist attacks. Fru Ndi declined, saying that the appearance of a military convoy would only serve to provoke an attack. Local separatist militias had announced that they would not interfere with the funeral, provided that no Francophone Cameroonians participated.

=== Kidnapping ===
According to Fru Ndi, the encounter began when gunmen approached his funeral convoy in Wainana, Bui Division. They said they wanted to talk with Fru Ndi, and that the convoy should go on without him. He replied that he had wanted to talk to them, but protested on the circumstances. The gunmen said that it would not take long, and Fru Ndi agreed to accompany them to a nearby school. Four of his aides came with him as the gunmen drove off. However, when the gunmen drove off to a valley, it became clear to Fru Ndi that he had actually been abducted.

It turned out that the gunmen's intention was to pressure Fru Ndi into withdrawing all SDF legislators from the National Assembly and the Senate. Fru Ndi replied that he would not, stating that it would be counterproductive to boycott the only forum where they could talk to President Biya. After Fru Ndi had refused to relent multiple times, the gunmen gave up and released him and his four aides after almost seven hours. Fru Ndi returned to his home in Bamenda unharmed.

=== Aftermath ===
By opting to travel without a military escort, Fru Ndi exposed himself, but also prevented a possible escalation. The SDF convened an emergency meeting after the incident's conclusion.

Following the abduction, the SDF directed sharp criticism against the Cameroonian government. In a statement, it blamed President Biya for losing control over Northwest Region and Southwest Region to militias and armed gangs. It asserted that this predicament could only be ailed through inclusive dialogue.

== Second kidnapping ==
Second kidnapping of John Fru Ndi
- Part of the Anglophone Crisis
- Date: 28-29 June 2019
- Location: Bamenda, Northwest Region, Cameroon
- Motive: Pressure Fru Ndi to withdraw all SDF legislators from the National Assembly and the Senate
- Outcome: Fru Ndi released after more than 24 hours
- Injuries: One bodyguard shot in the leg

On 28 June 2019, gunmen entered Fru Ndi's home in Bamenda. Unlike the first incident, this time he was subjected to beating, insults and being dragged through the mud. After being dragged out of his home, he was forced into a van and driven off to an unknown location. Fru Ndi's bodyguard was shot in the leg during the incident, and was rushed to a hospital.

After spending some time in a cell, Fru Ndi was given a bamboo bed to sleep on. Despite his poor health, he was not offered food that night, nor did he get to take his medicines. The next morning, he was given an ultimatum: the separatists demanded that he declared on camera that he would recall all SDF parliamentarians and mayors within 24 hours. The separatists argued that the SDF harmed their cause, which Fru Ndi countered by arguing that the party had done a lot for Anglophone Cameroonians. He made a vague promise to talk to SDF politicians, and to then get back to the separatists. The separatists told him he had never visited them before, to which he replied that he had never been invited. Fru Ndi was also accused of ordering the Cameroonian Army to attack separatist camps in the vicinity of Bamenda, which he strongly denied. In the end, the separatists forced him to be photographed with the flag of Ambazonia, before he was driven back to his residence late at night. He returned to his home with a swollen head and an elbow injury.

== See also ==
- List of kidnappings
