= Foumban =

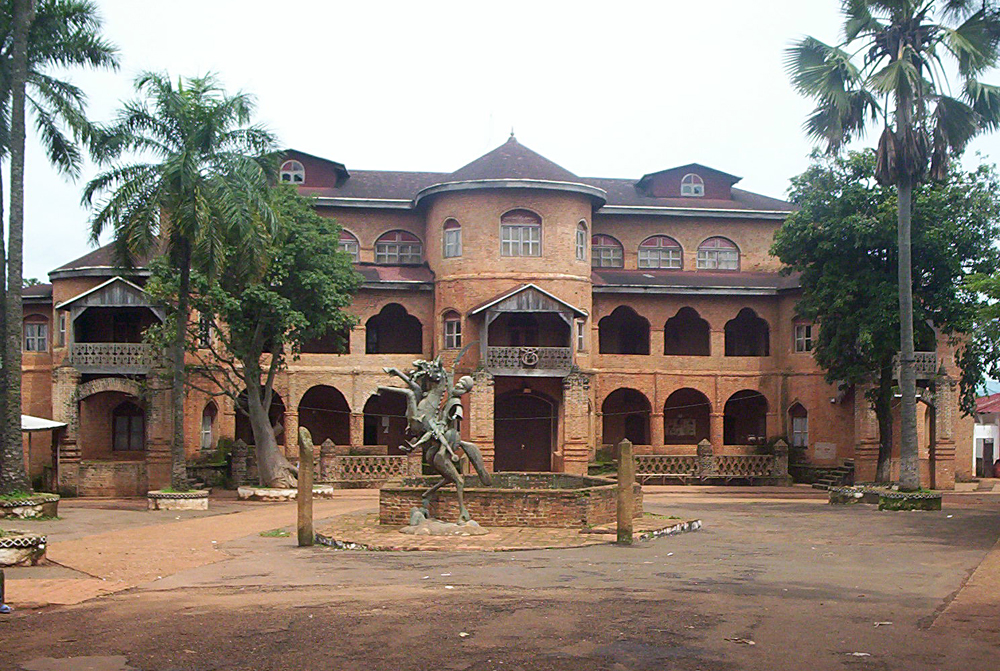
- Palace of the Sultan of Bamun at Foumban

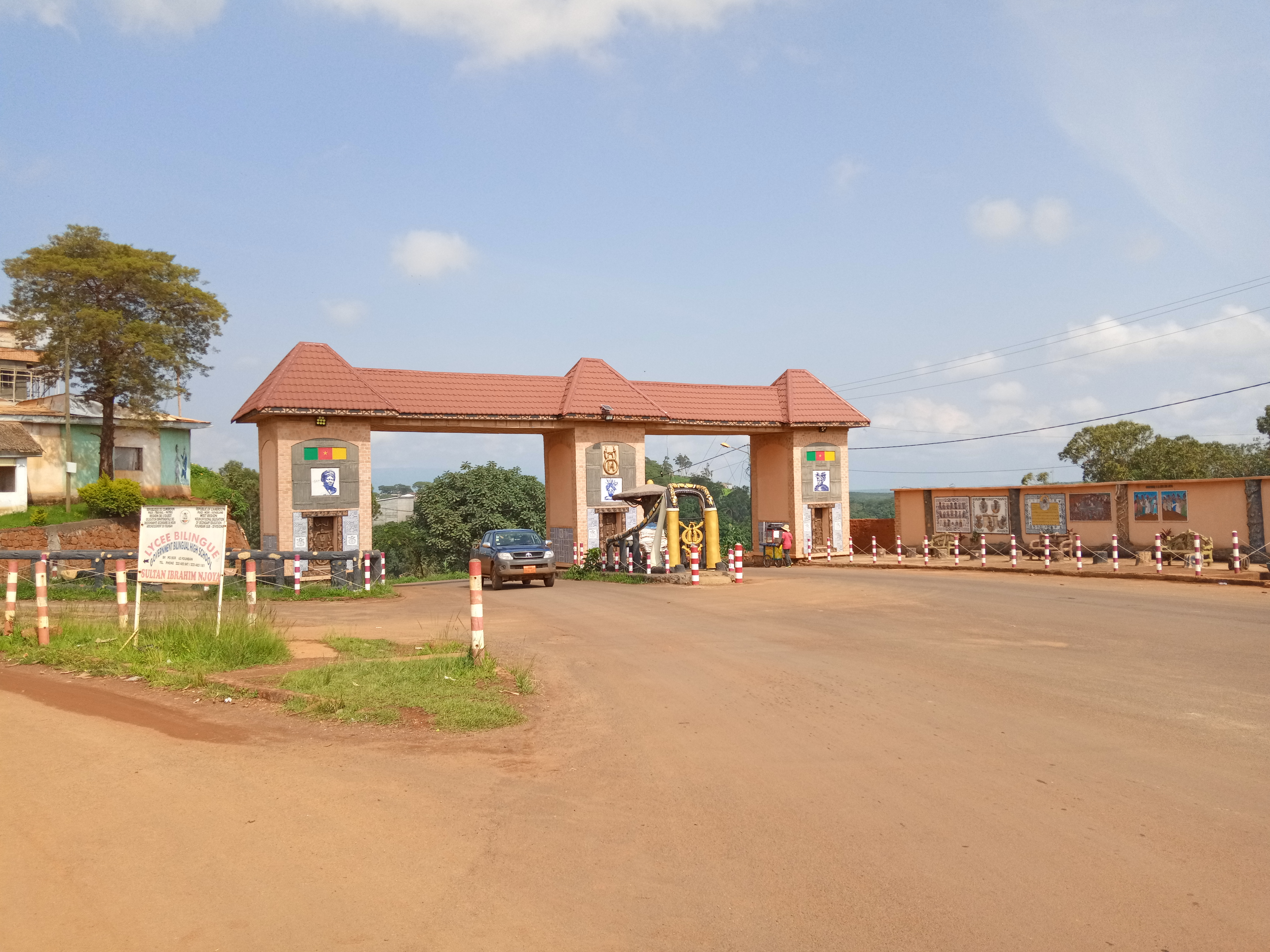
- Motto: Entree de la ville de Foumban - 02

- Location in Cameroon
- Coordinates: 5°43′N 10°55′E
- Country: Cameroon
- Province: West
- Department: Noun

Population (2005)
  - Total: 83,522 (Census)

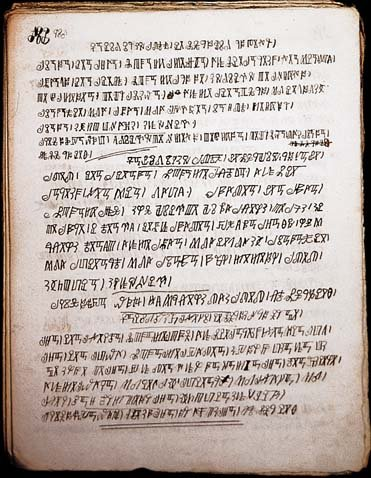
Bamum Shumom text

Foumban or Fumban is a city in Cameroon, lying north east of Bafoussam. It has a population of 83,522 (at the 2005 Census). It is a major town for the Bamoun people and is home to a museum of traditional arts and culture. Foumban is known for its political significance in the formation of Cameroon's history and its cultural, tourism and economic potential. There is also a market and a craft centre, while Foumban Royal Palace contains a museum with information on Ibrahim Njoya who invented a new language script, Bamum script, and the artificial language Shümom.

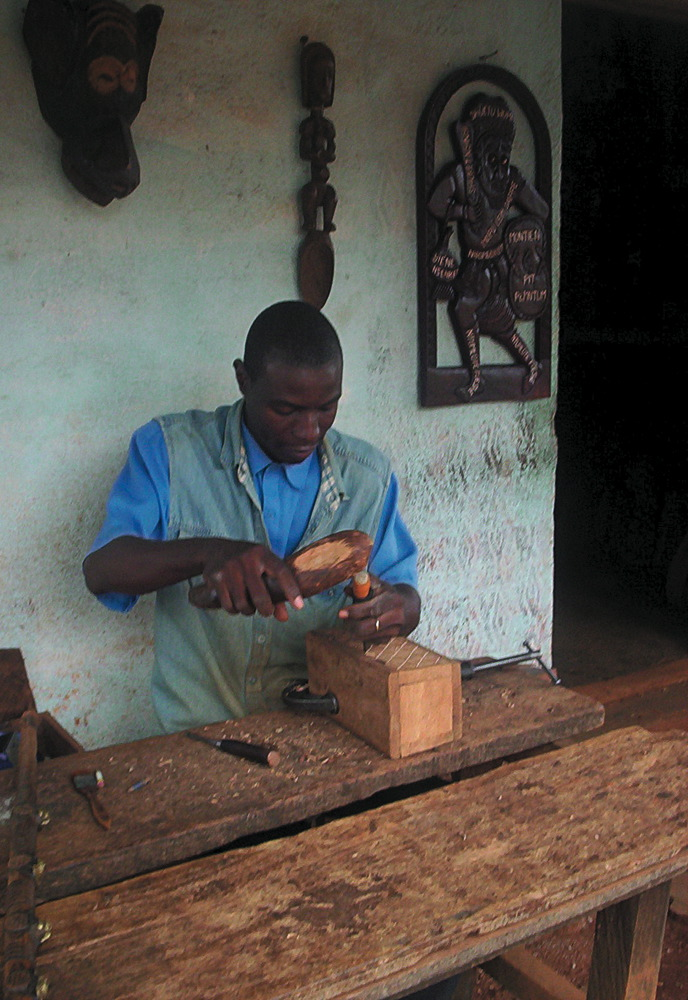
A Bamun artisan in Foumban

== History ==
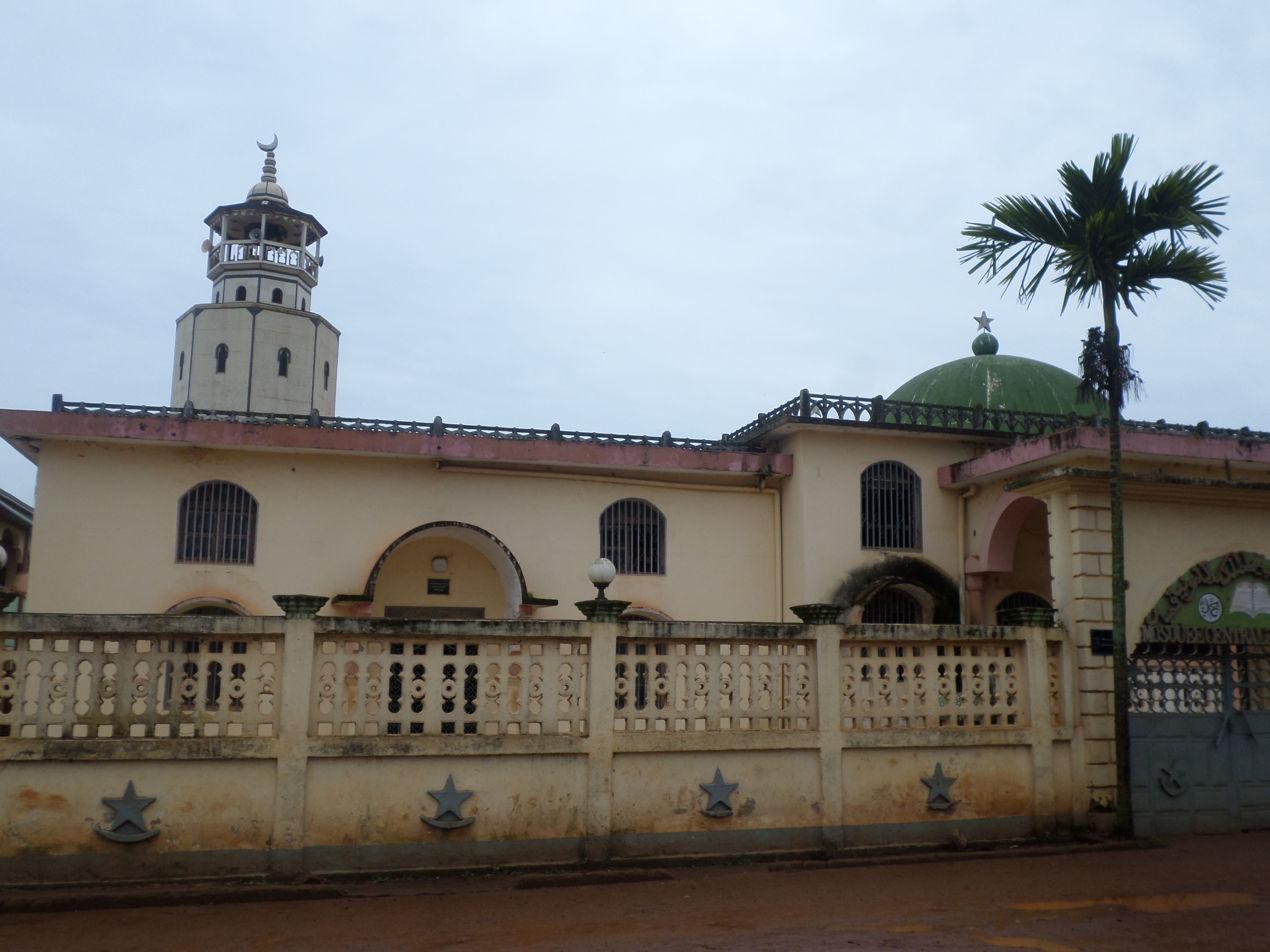
The central mosque

Foumban is the headquarters of the Noun Division of the Western province. It was the seat of the Bamoun Dynasty. The Bamoun Dynasty was founded in the 1394 by Mfon Nshare Yen. Mfon Nshare became the first Mfon (what is today called Sultan) and was the founding father of Foumban, which became the capital city of the Bamoun Dynasty. This was as a result of the many wars against neighbouring kingdoms between 1394 and 1418. Since then, Founban has politically, culturally and economic grown into a tourist city of great renown in Cameroon. Its rich history and development has seen it surpass other cities and towns in the region, and it continues to attract hundreds of visitors.

The sultan was beheaded in a war with the Nso people from the North West Province of Cameroon, and his head carried off in 1889. The skull was returned during the time of German colonial administration before WW1.

Foumban is one of Cameroon's major attractions and an important centre of traditional African art. Its jewel is the Palais Royal, seat of power for the Bamoun people. The ruler of the Bamoun is known as the sultan, and the Bamoun can trace the lineage of their sultan back to 1394.

The palace, completed in 1917, resembles a medieval chateau. It houses the Sultan's Museum, which contains a multitude of royal gowns, arms, musical instruments, statues, jewellery, masks and colourful bead-covered thrones carved in the shapes of the men who sat on them.

A few hundred metres south of the palace is the Musée des Arts et des Traditions Bamoun. This extensive collection has exhibits on Bamoun history and art, including cooking implements, musical instruments, pipes, statues, masks, gongs and an ornately carved xylophone. The road that connects the two museums is the Rue des Artisans, home to sculptors, basket makers, weavers and embroiderers, and one of the best places in Central Africa to buy wood carvings.

Views of the Palais du Roi des Bamouns

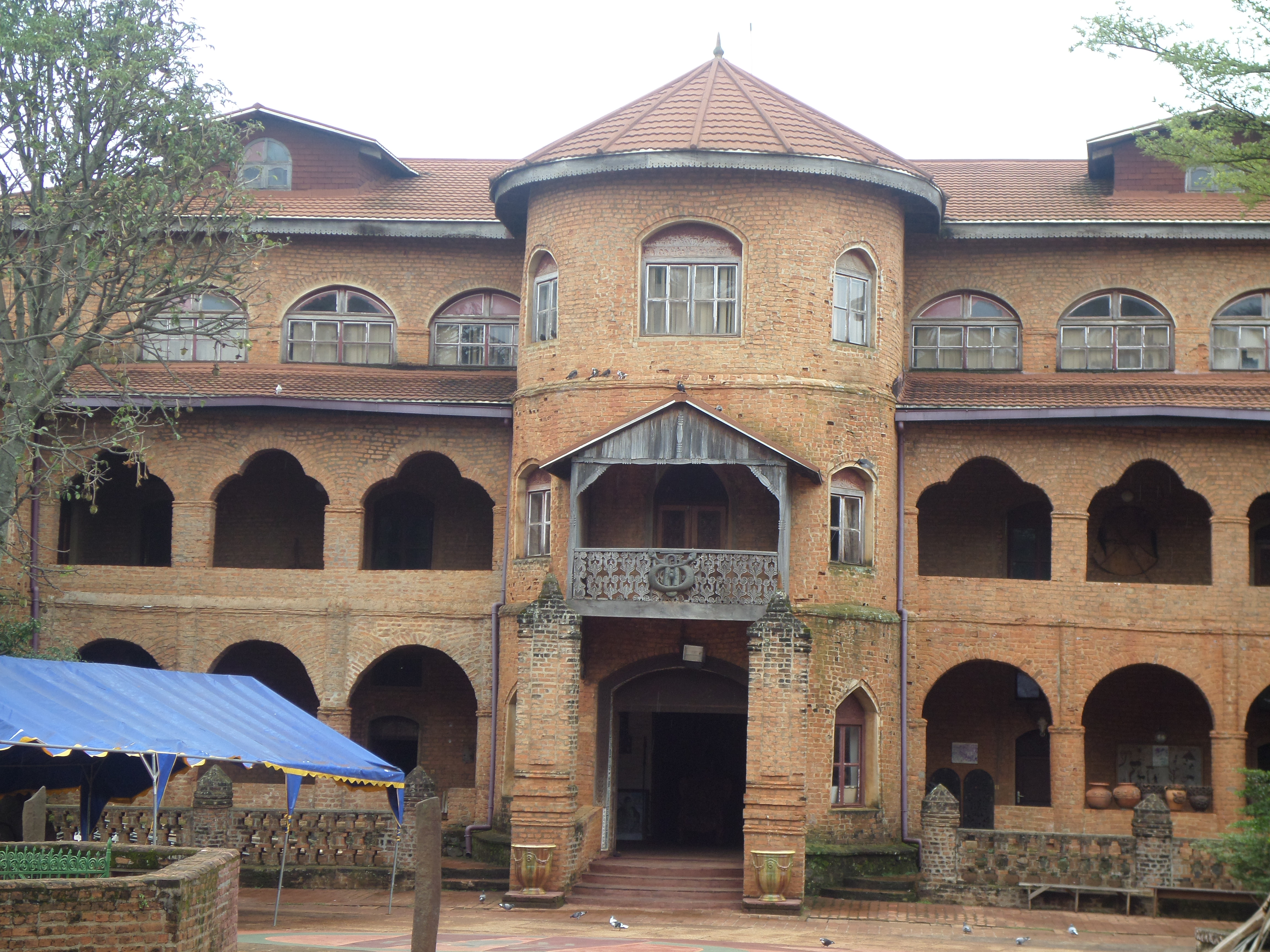

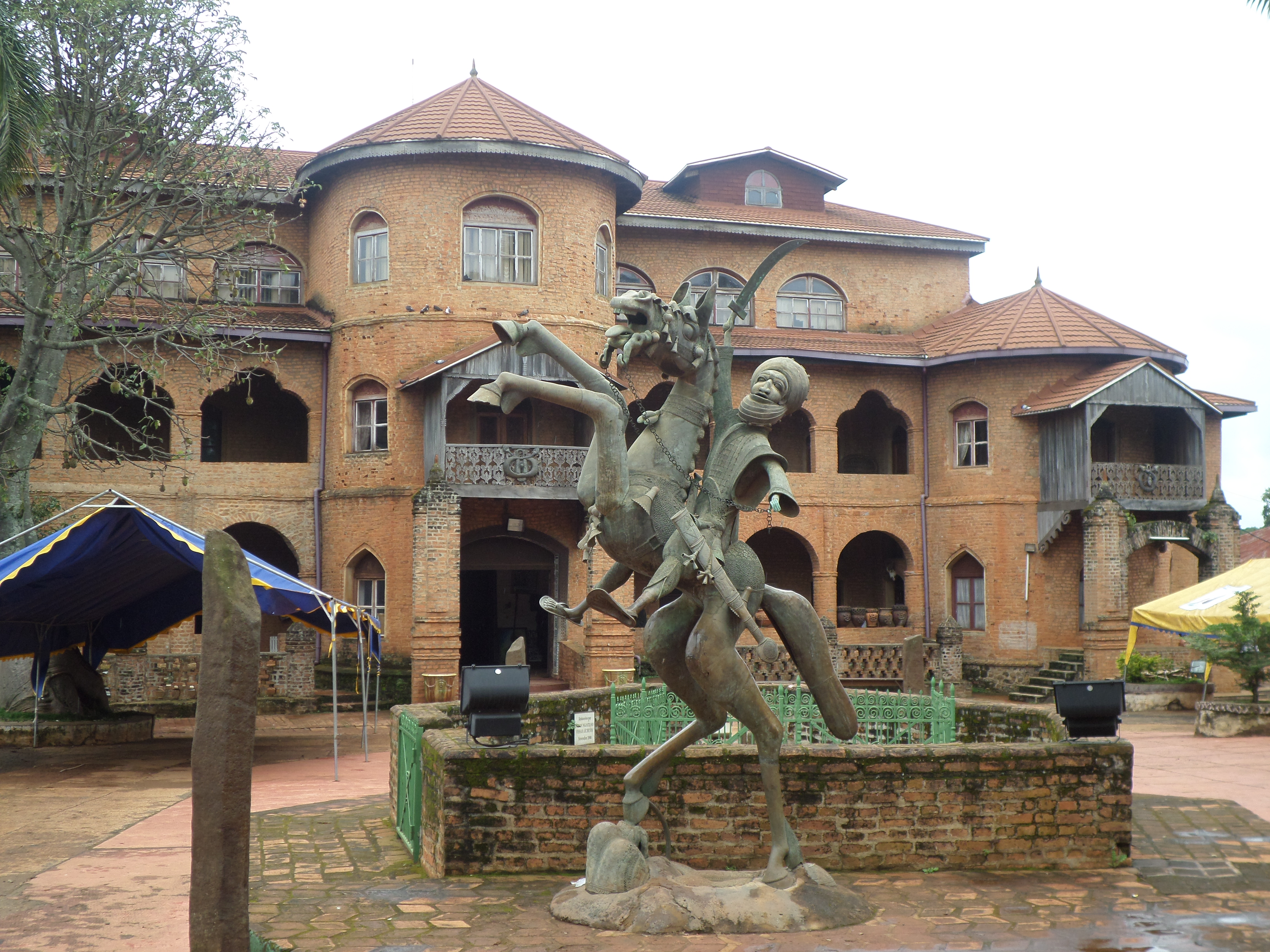

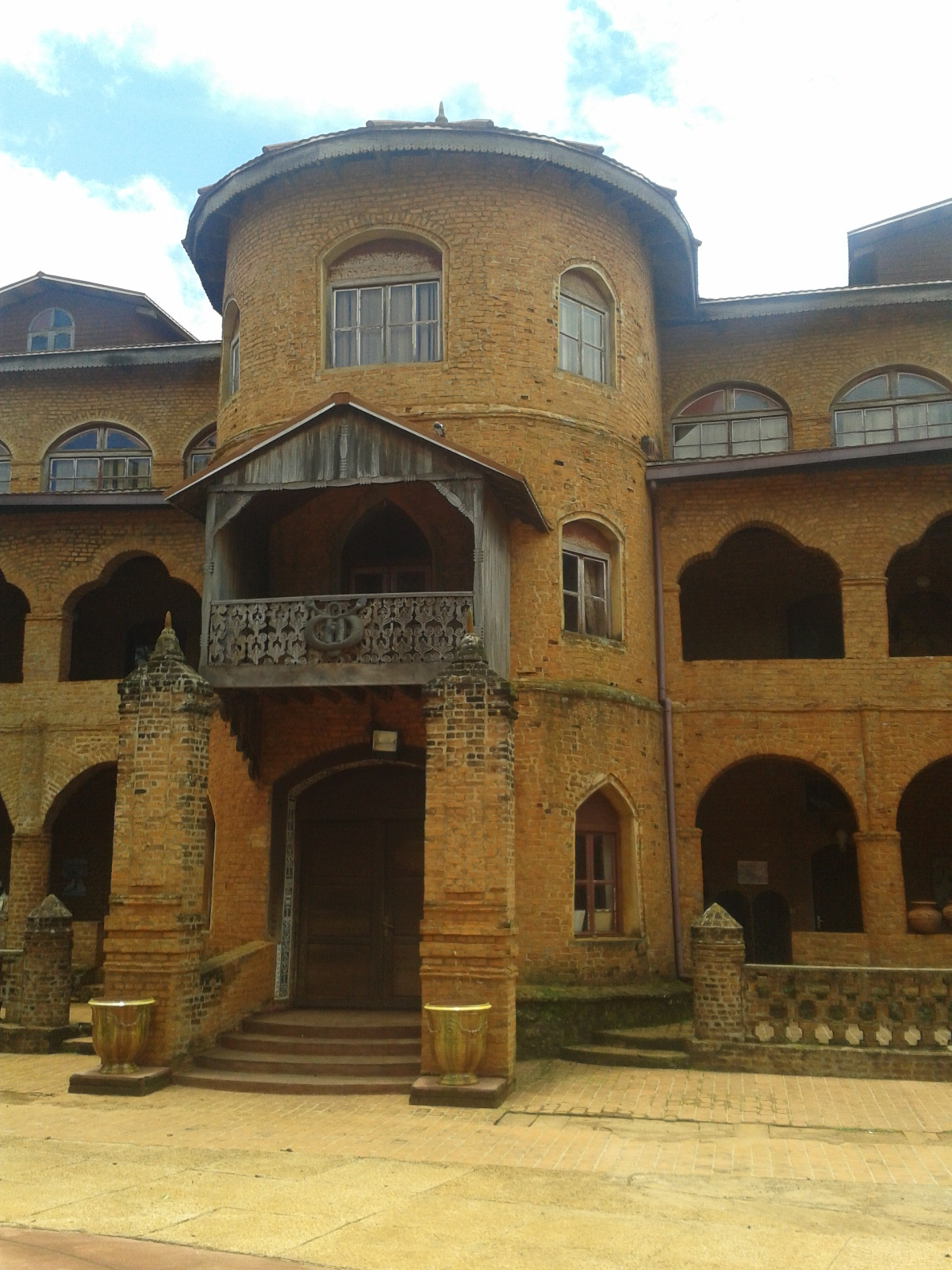

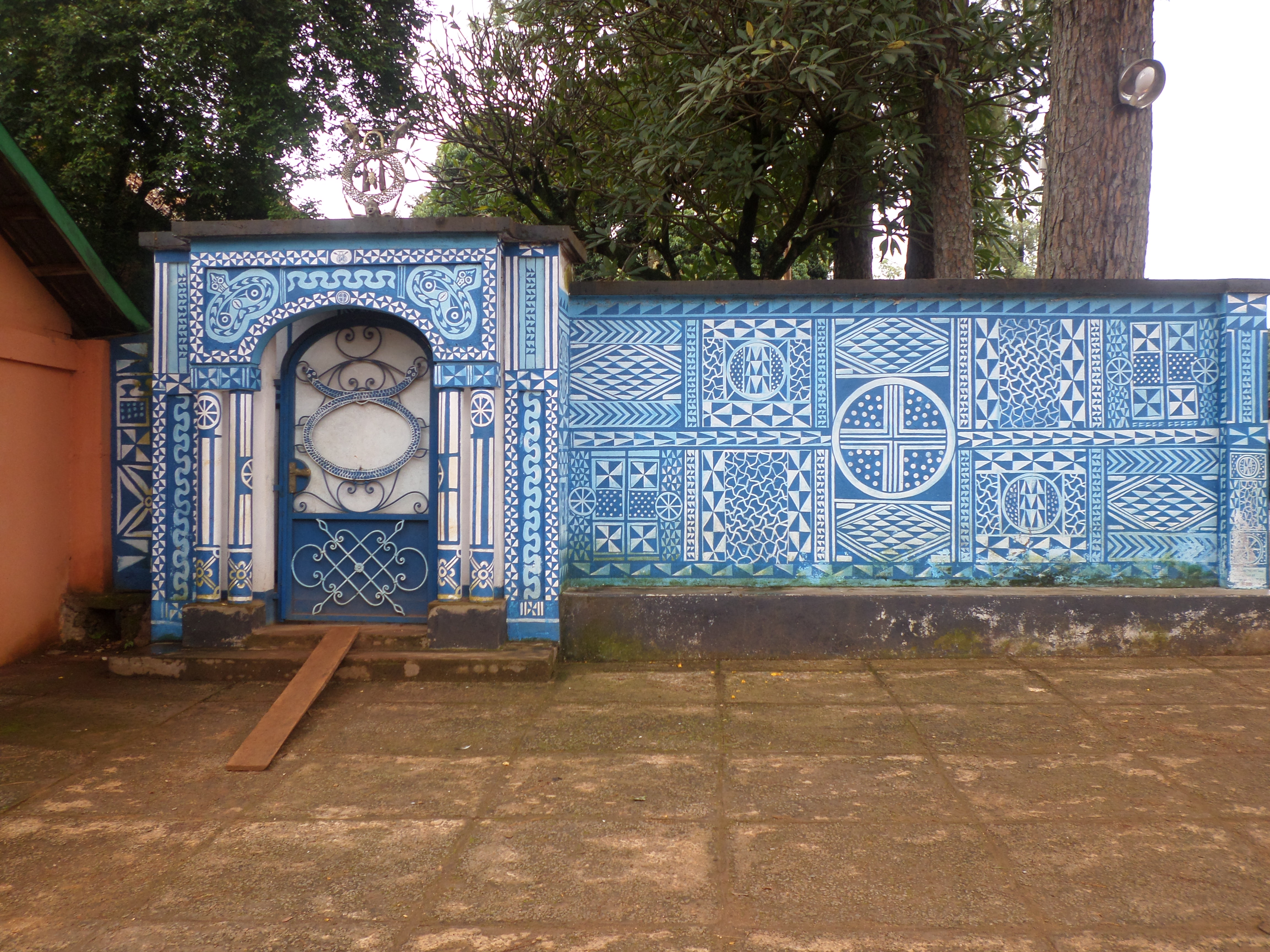

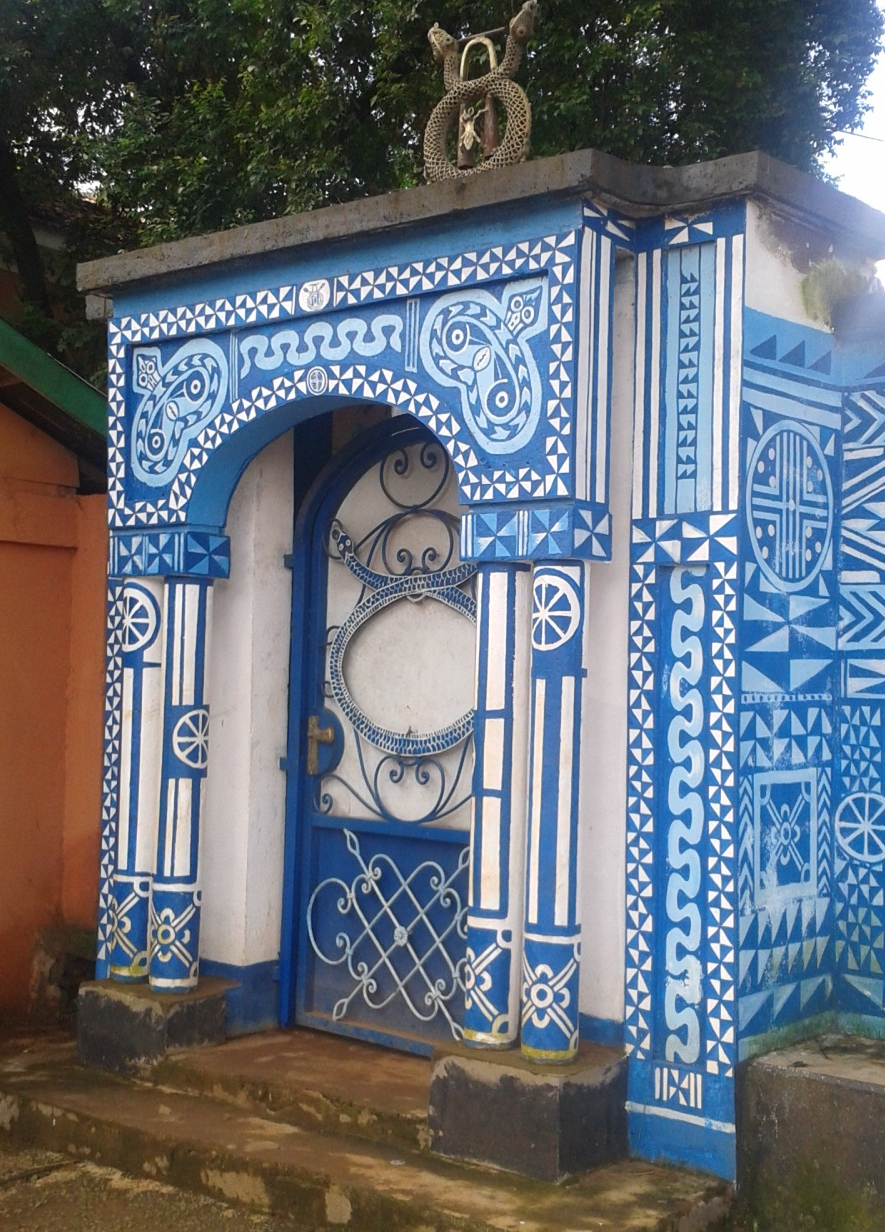
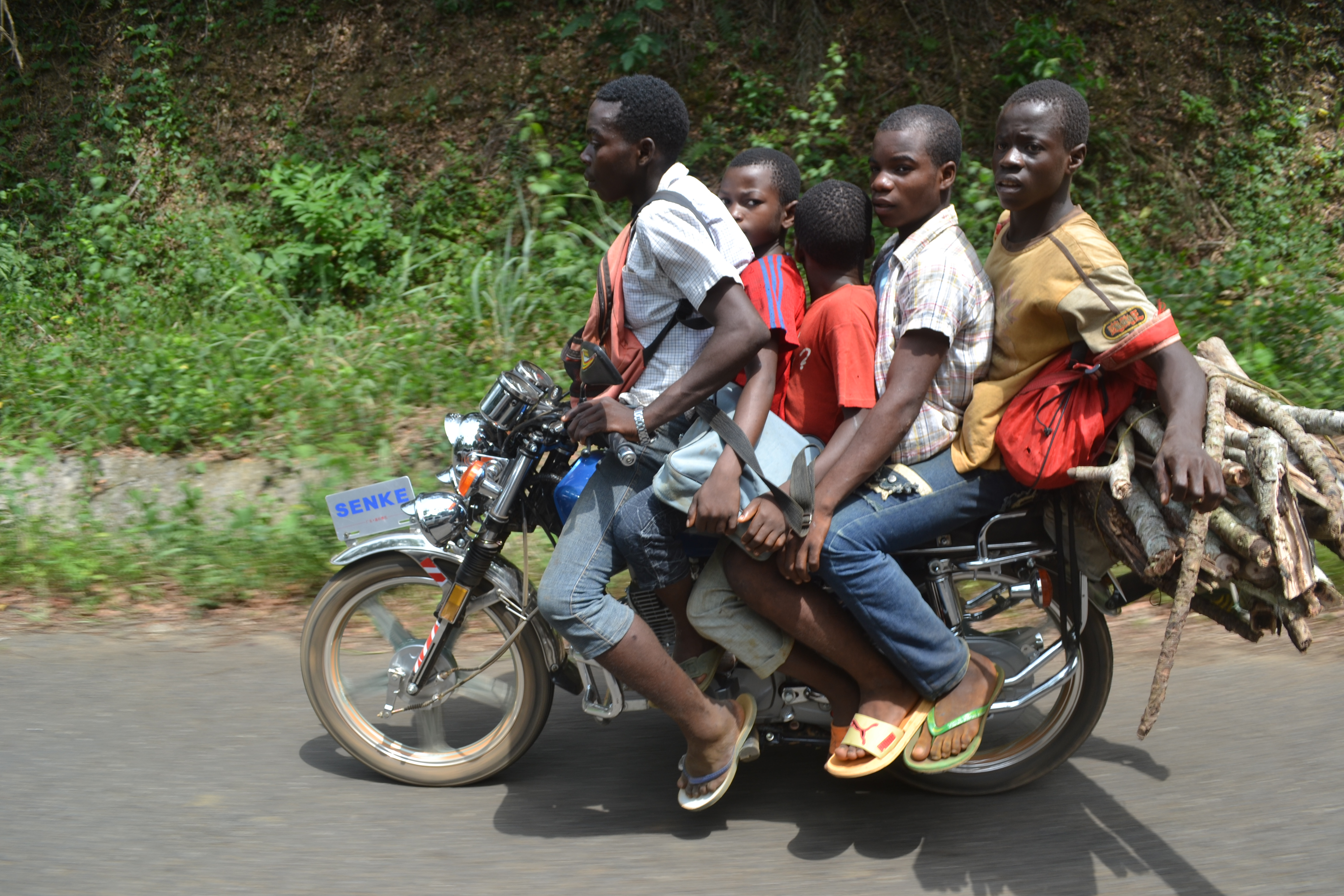
Public transport

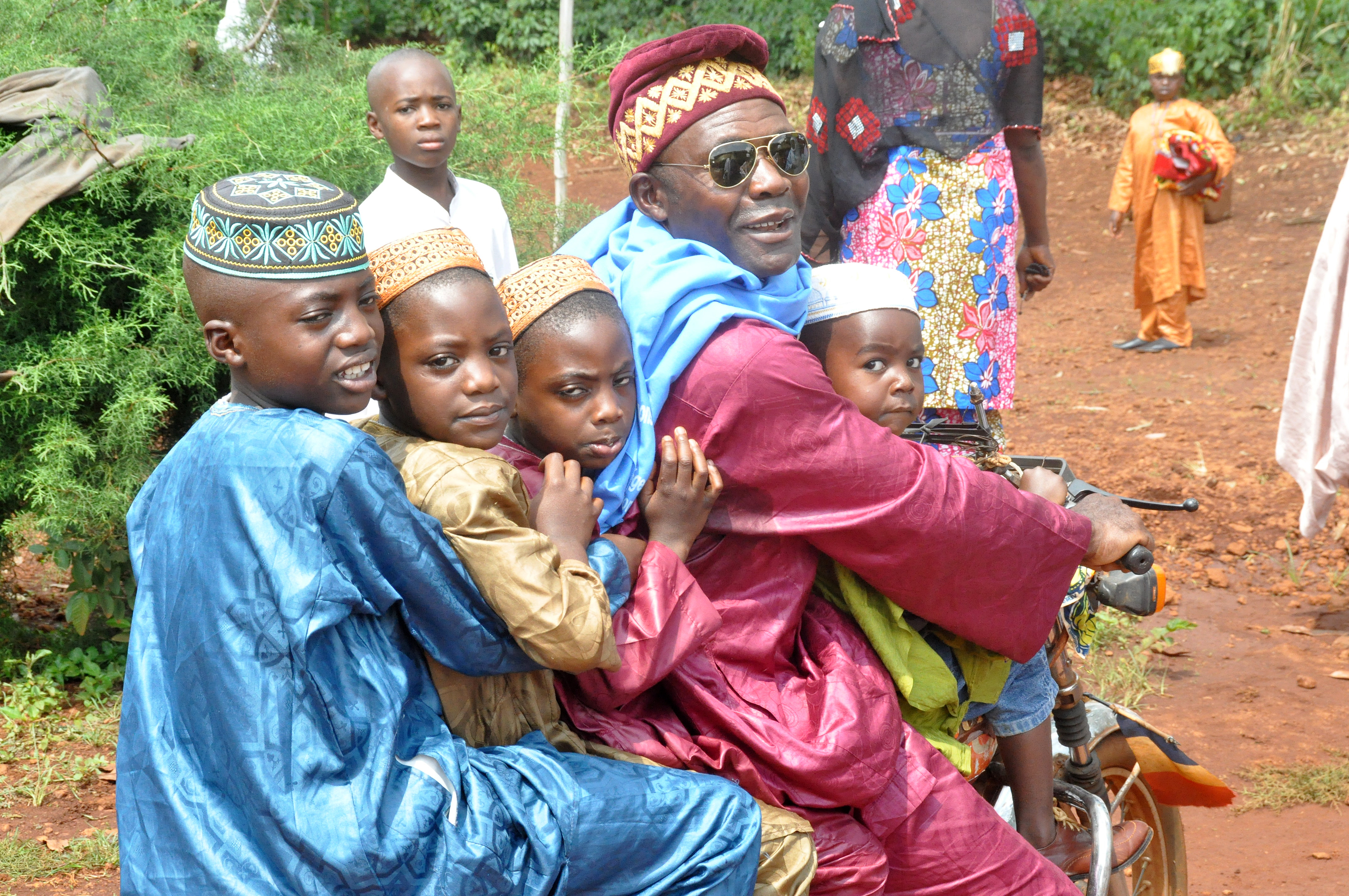
Family on motorbike

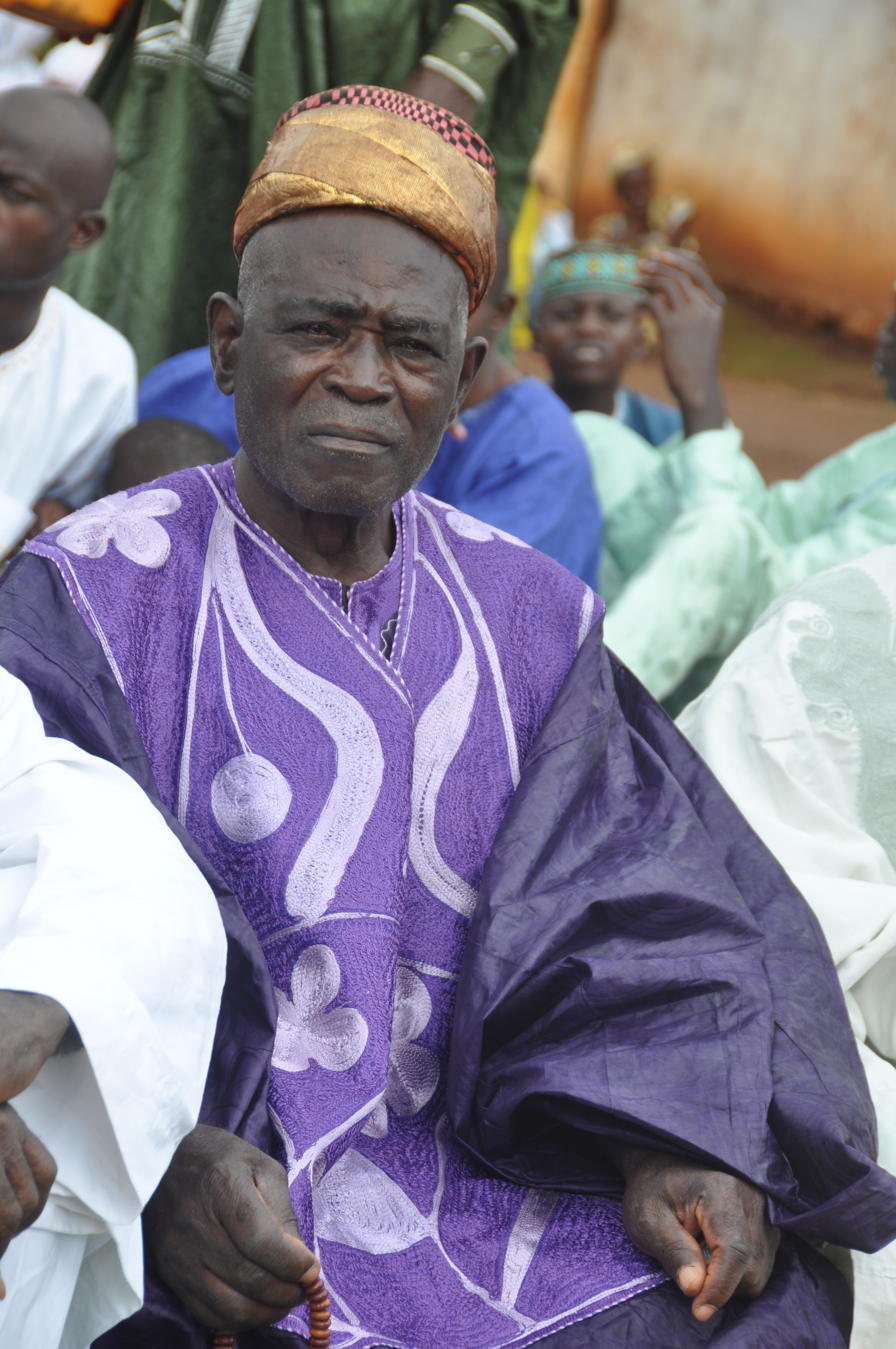
Adult, day of celebration

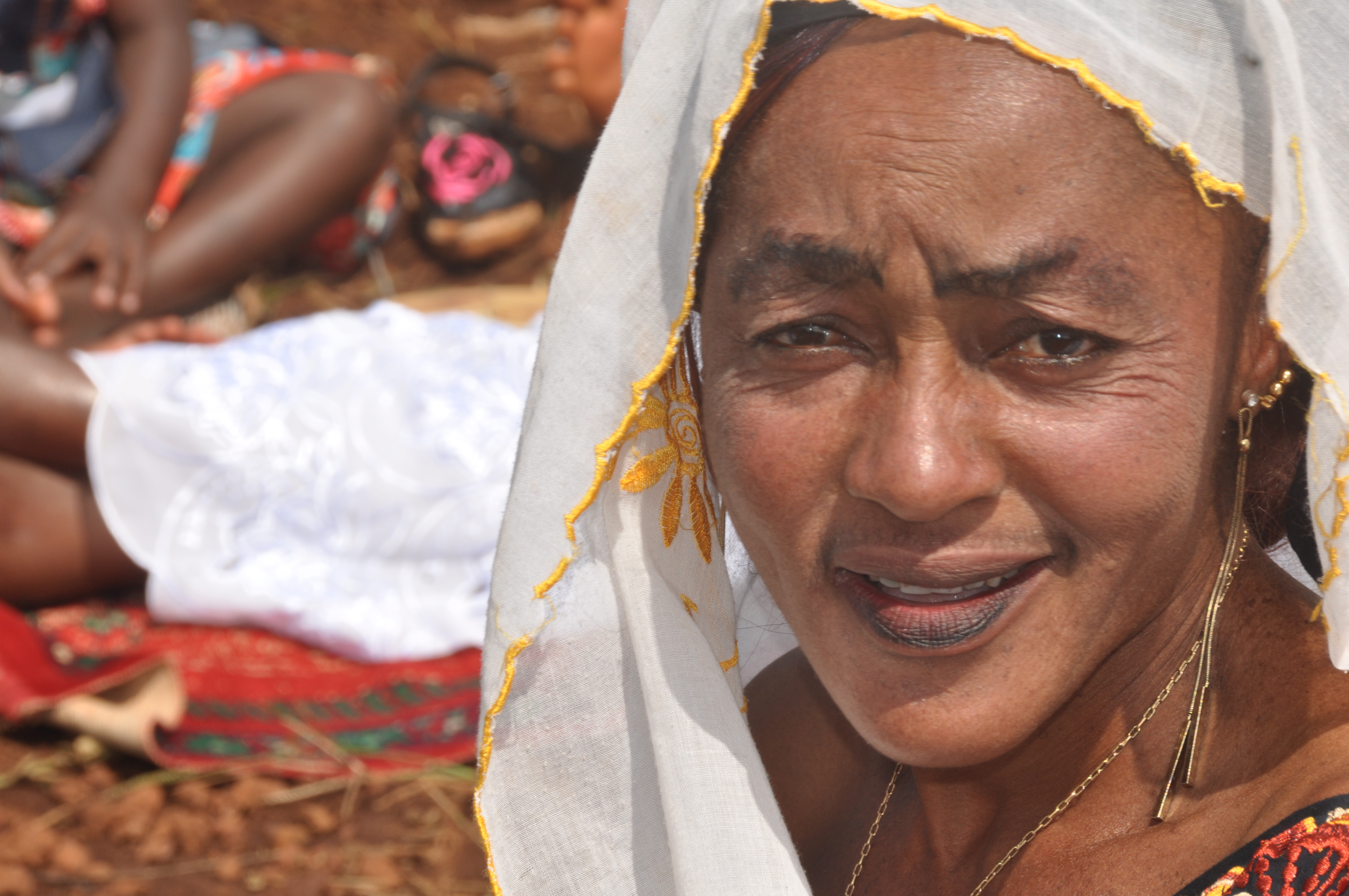
Woman, feast day

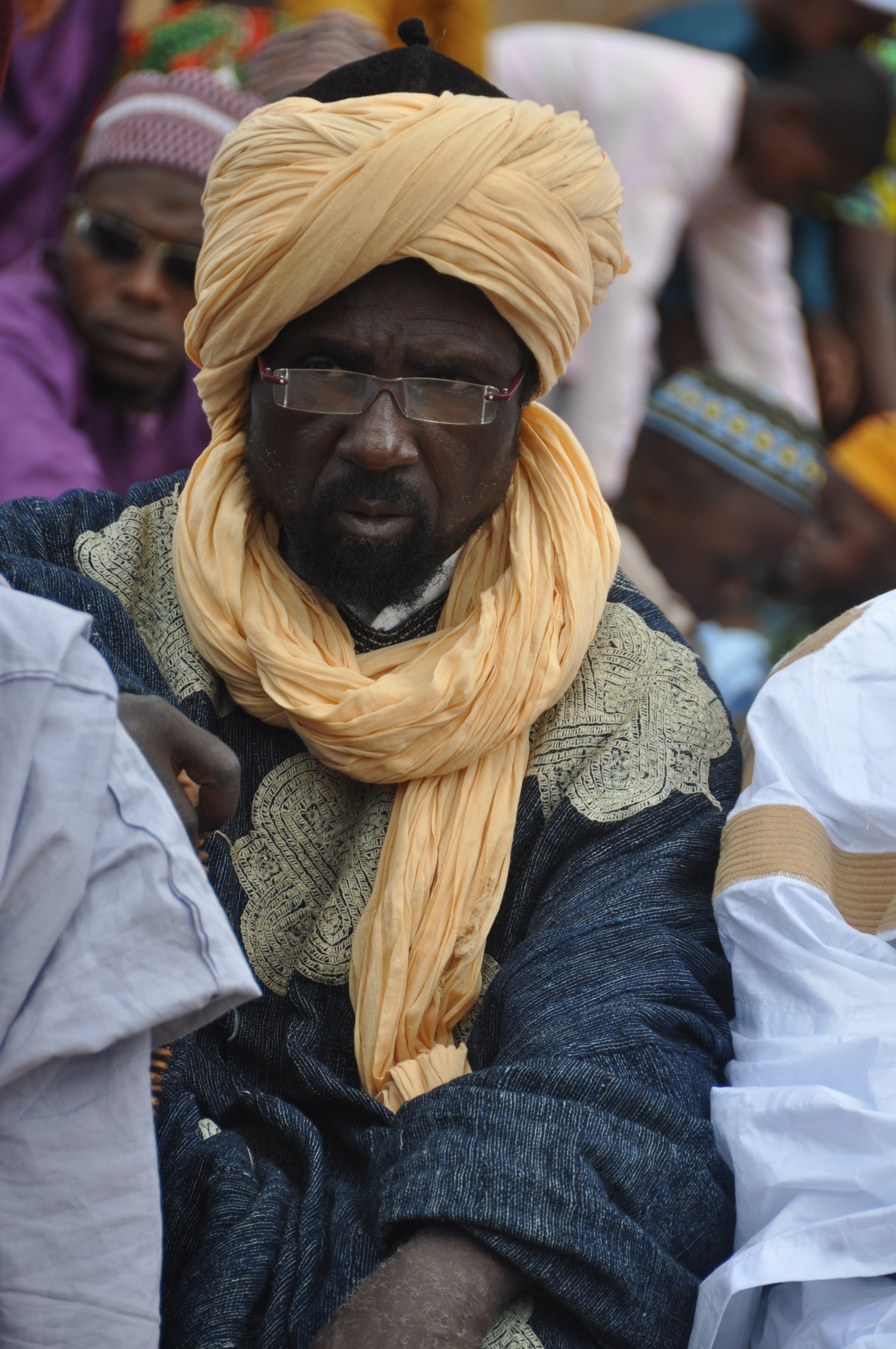
Man, feast day

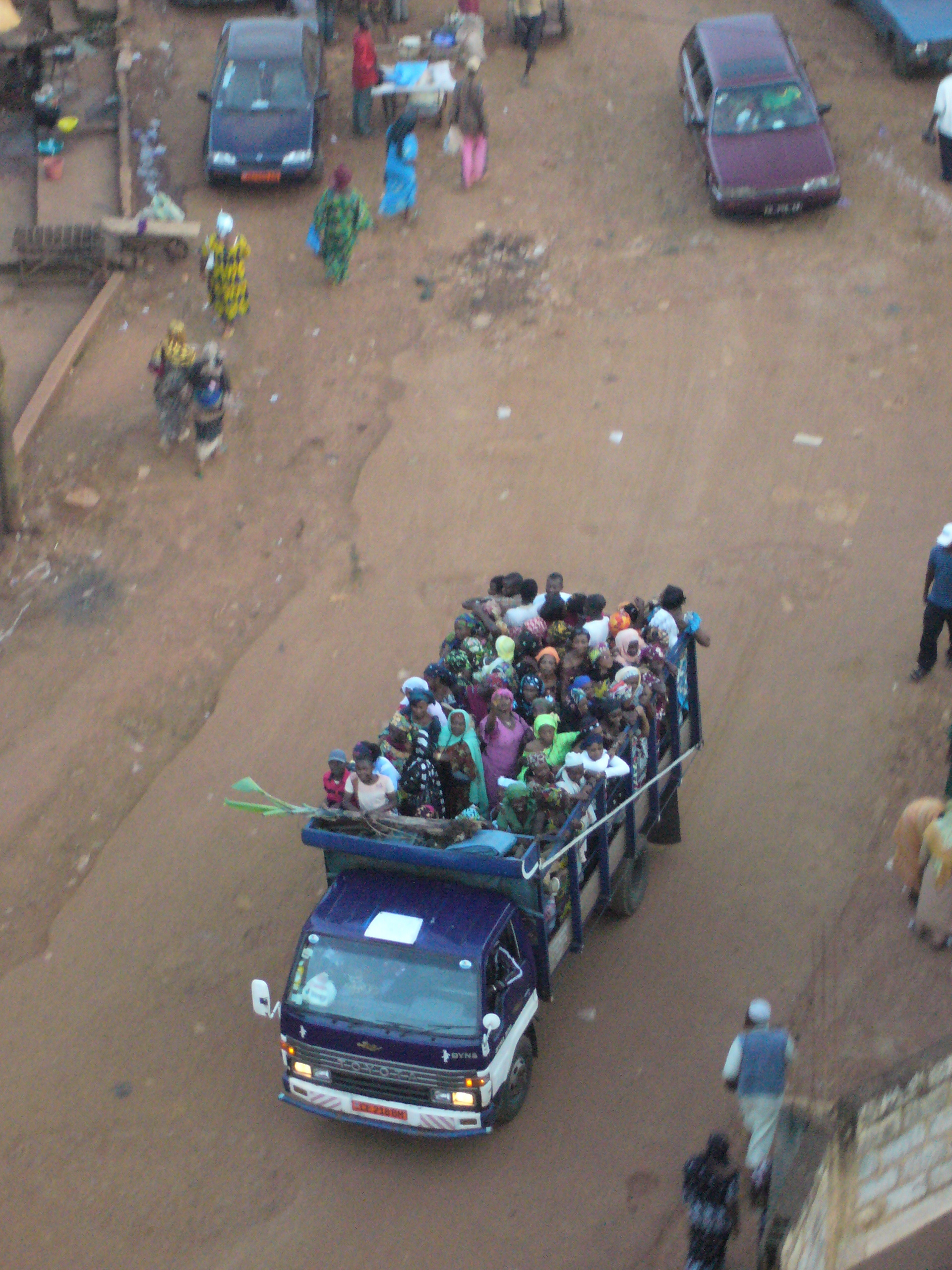
Wedding guests

== Economy ==
The economy was largely agricultural, and slave owning was practiced on a small scale. The Bamum kingdom also traded with neighboring populations. They imported salt, iron, beads, cotton goods and copper objects. The main economic activity in Foumban as of today is tourism and agriculture which is largely subsistence. Thousands of tourist visit this ancient city to take a look at the remains of arts and cultural display of the kings of this historic town. The streets are decorated with artistic designed but much more is the palace which protrudes and imposes at the center of the city. Its centrality symbolizes an era where the kings represents the nerve center of the entire community. Artwork is the major source of income. There is an art market, a tourist center and a museum called Musée des Arts et des Traditions Bamoun. Agriculture is also carried out in small-scale subsistence farming. However, due to its very rich and fertile soil, the government of Cameroon has established a research centre to develop local hybrid of seeds to expand on the agricultural sector. The Institute for Agronomic Research (IRAD) has engage the community in partnership with the government in developing large-scale fishing in this landlocked community. Other economic activities include cattle rearing and palm oil production. Coffee is the main cash crop that is produced and sold in the world market.

== Culture ==
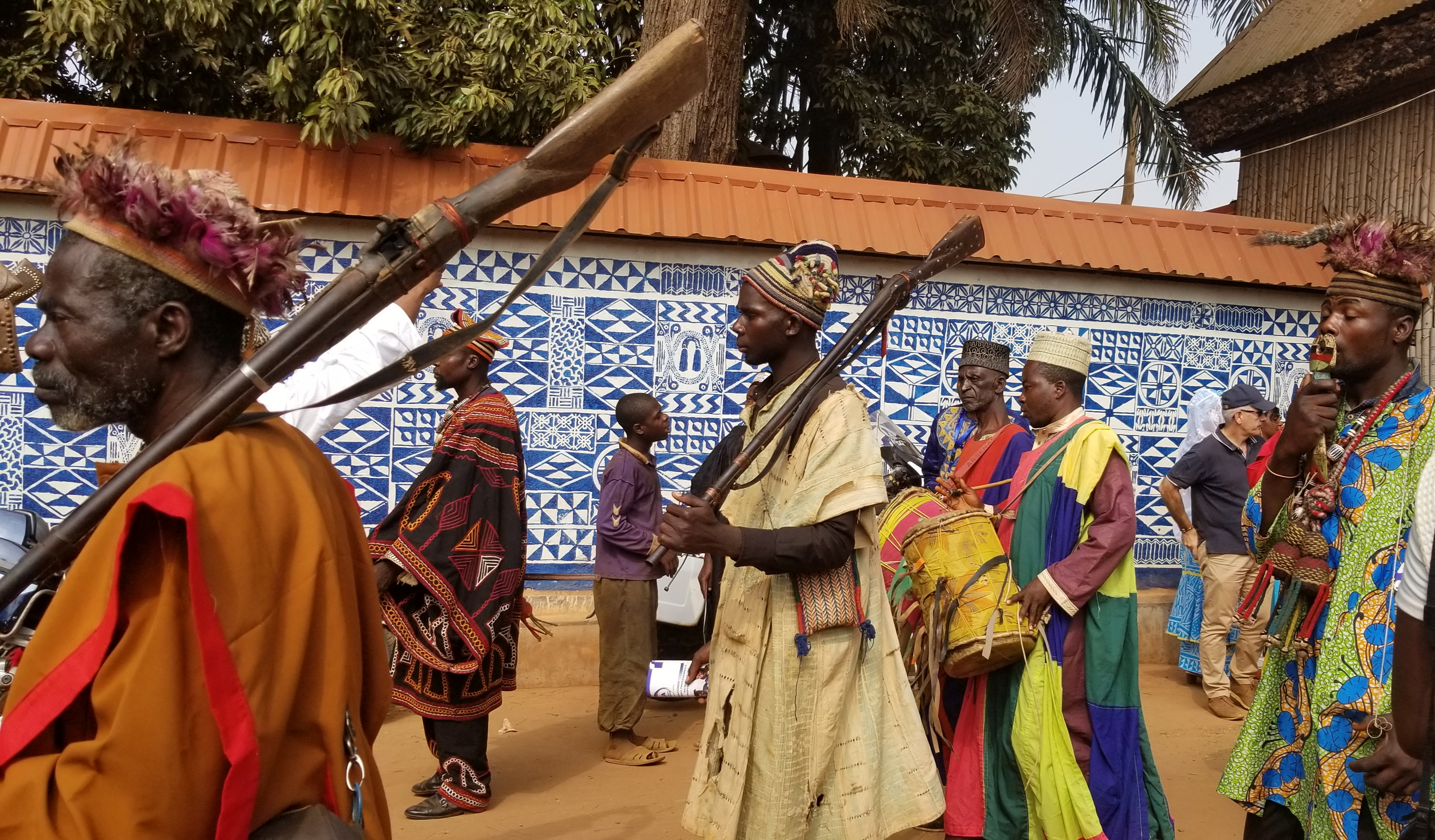
March with Sultan in Foumban.

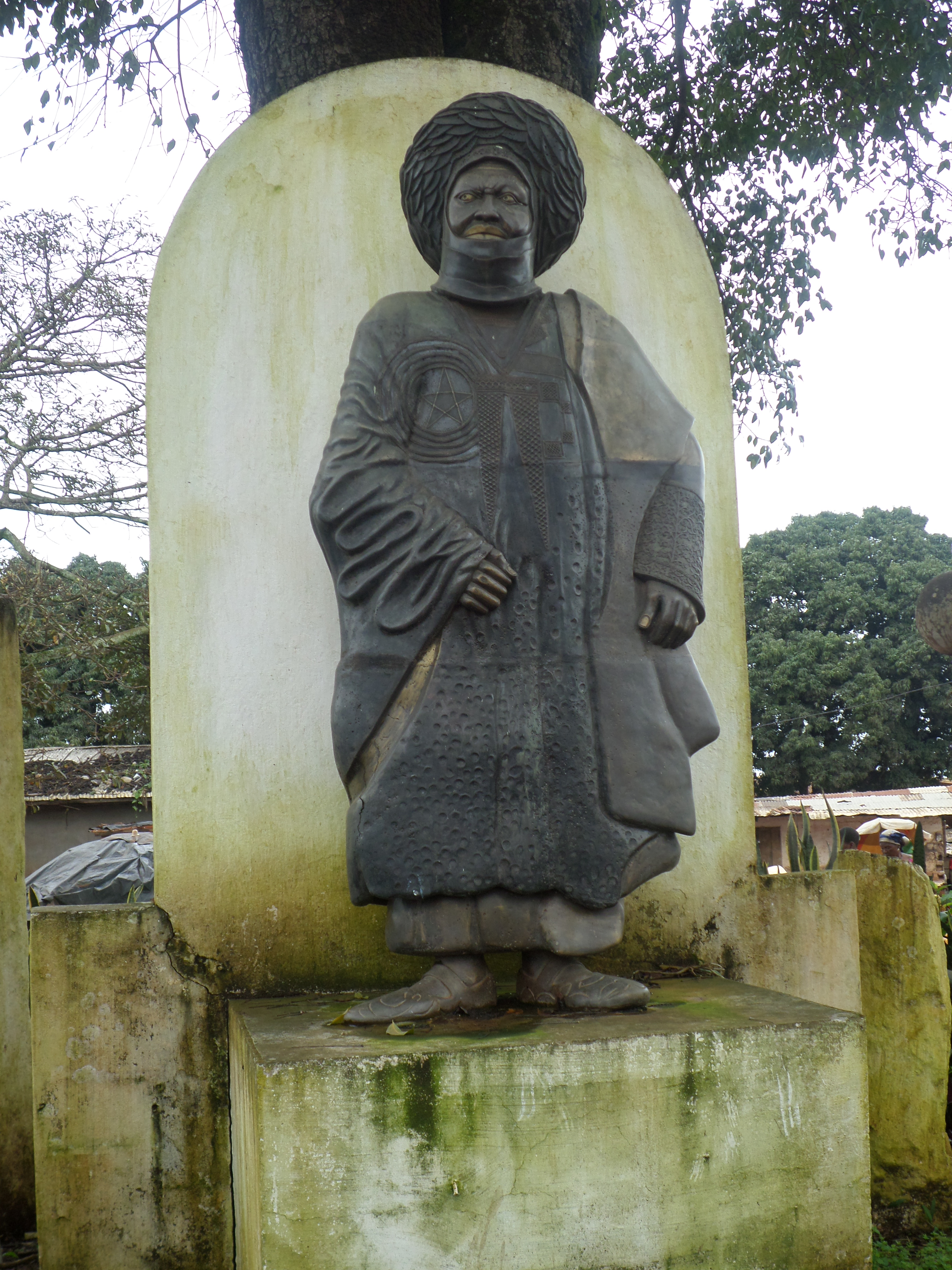
Statue of Njoya

The Bamoun people trace their origin from Tikar in Cameroon. Thus it no surprise that the language of the Bamum kingdom was related to the Tikars in the western highlands of Cameroon. This apparently did not last long, and the language of the conquered, Mben, was adopted. The Bamun developed an extensive artistic culture at their capital of Foumban at the beginning of the 20th century. During Njoya's reign six dye pits containing various colours were maintained. The Mbum also imported indigo-dyed raffia-sewn cloth from the Hausa as royal cloth. This royal cloth was called Ntieya, and Hausa craftsmen were kept at palace workshops to supply nobles and teach the art of dyeing.

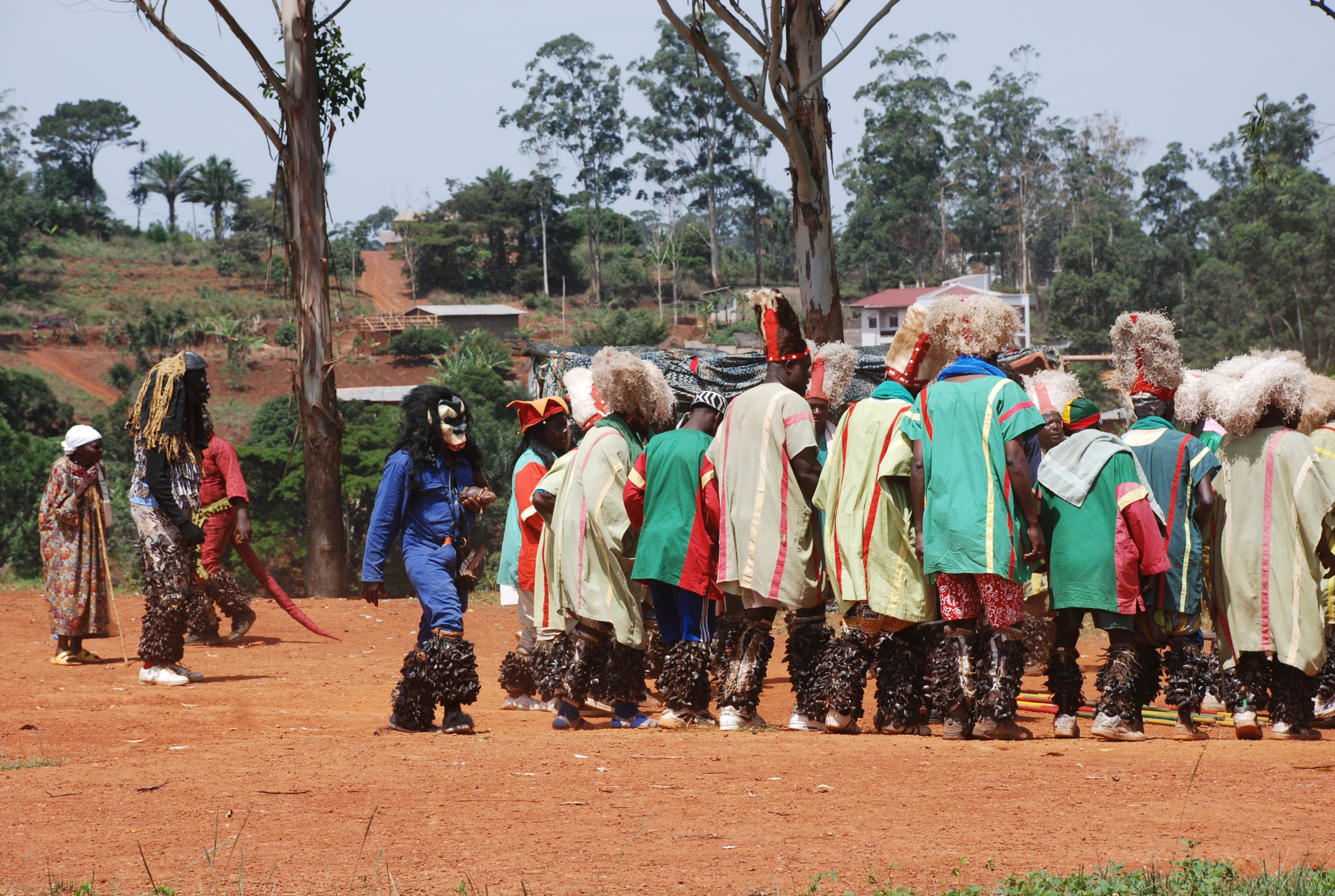
Njiyit village, traditional dance

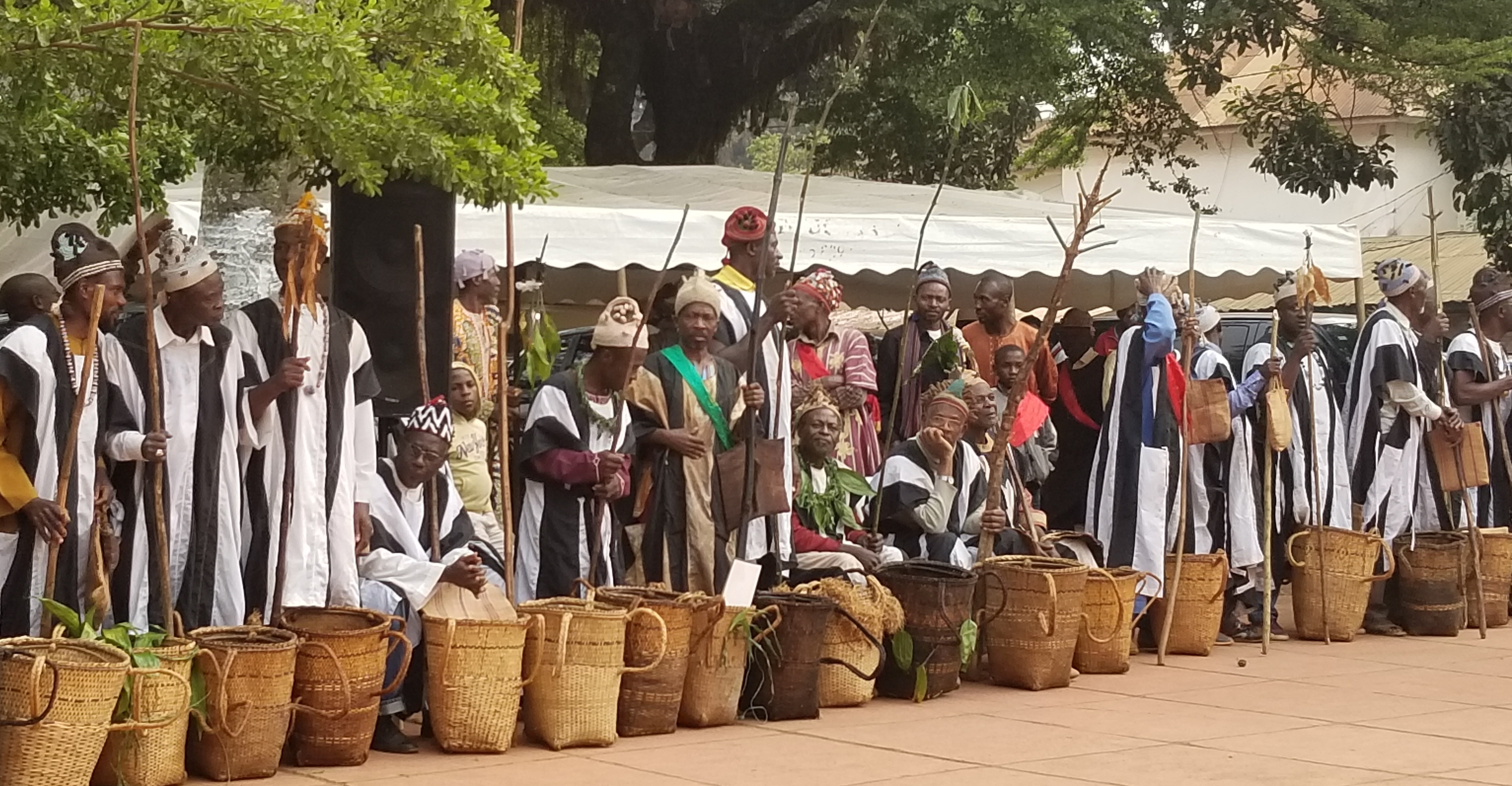
Assembly of tribal chiefs for Foumban, Cameroon festival

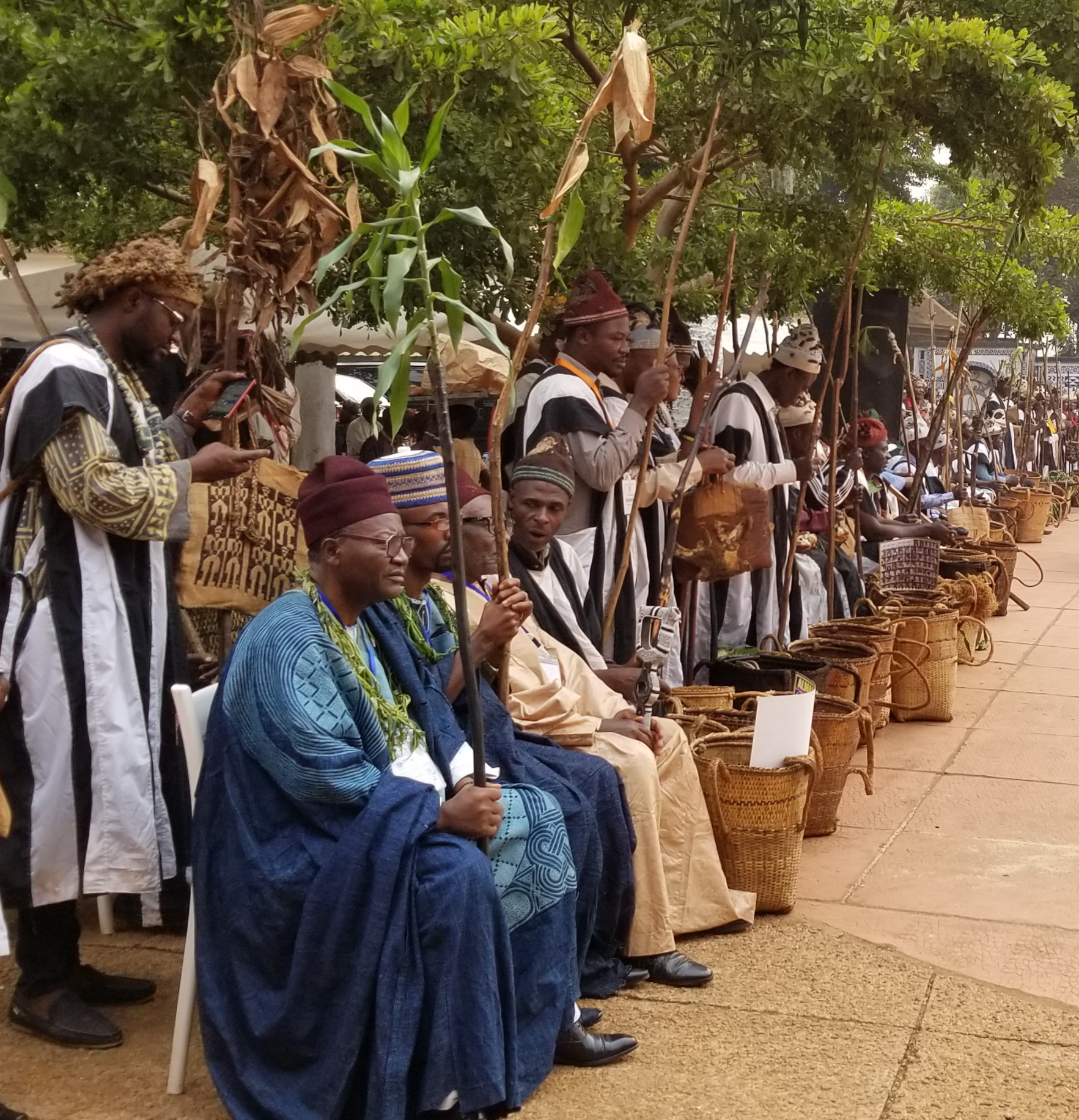
Call of Foumban chefs

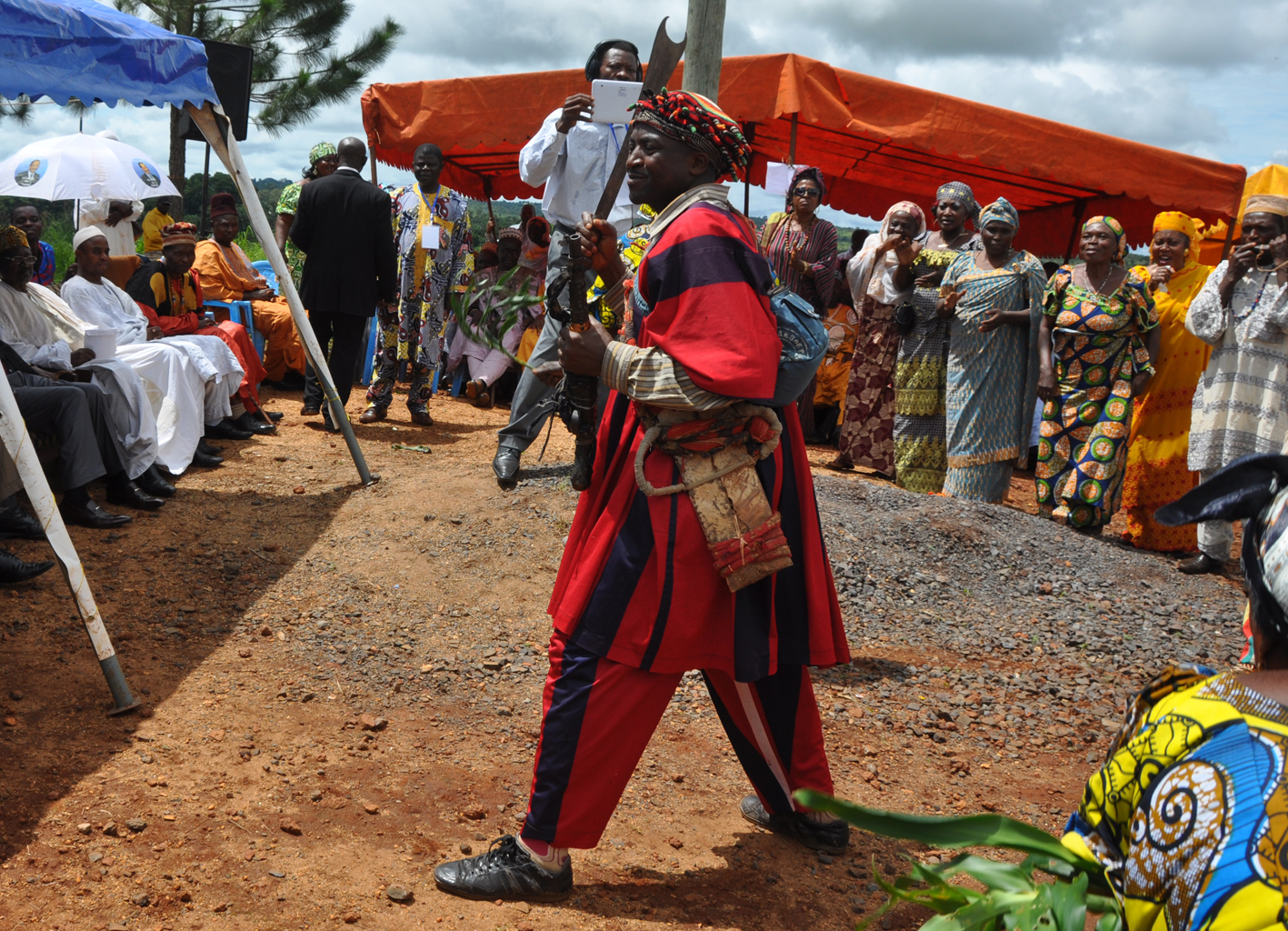
Traditional dance

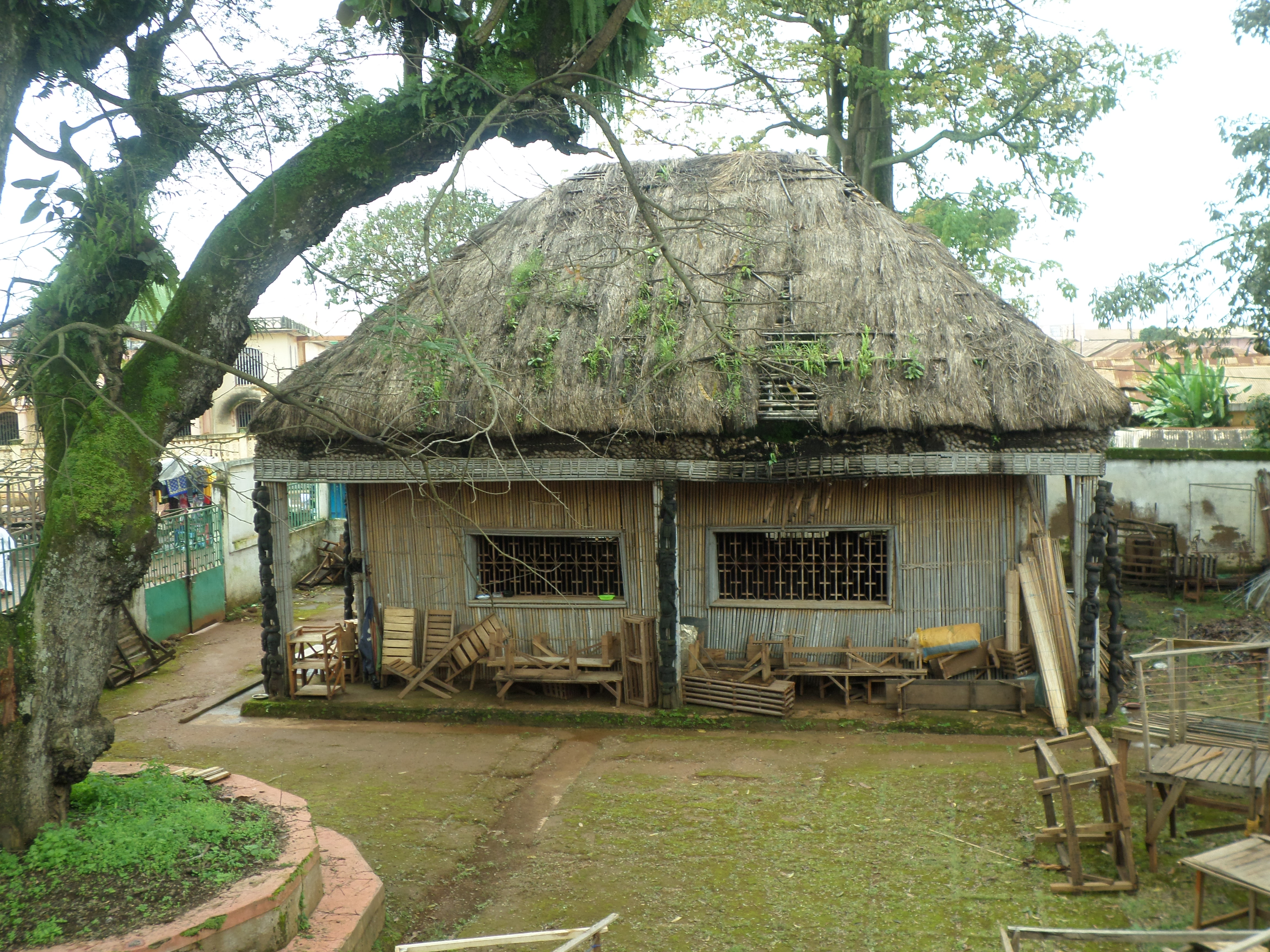
Tam-tam case

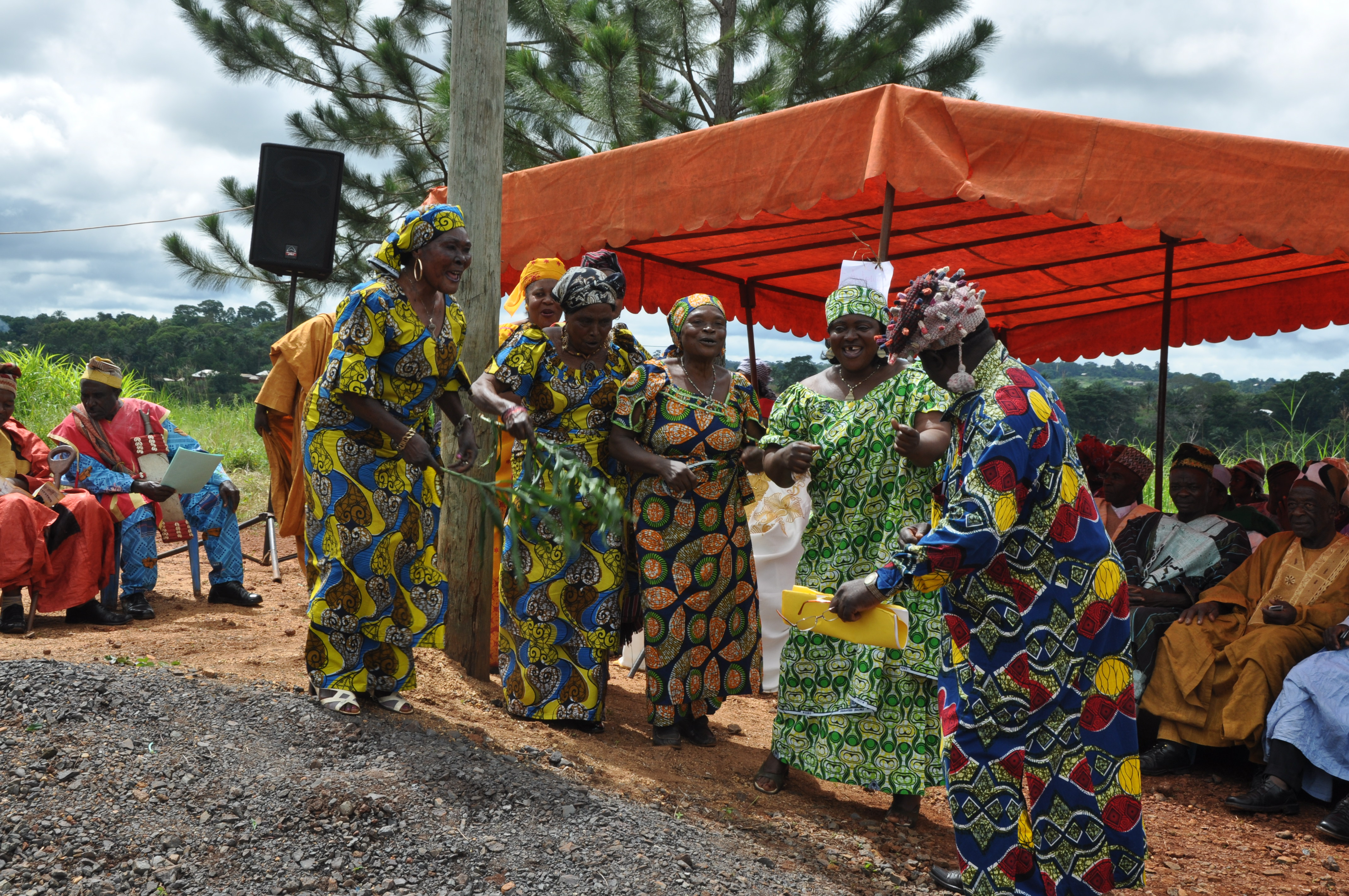

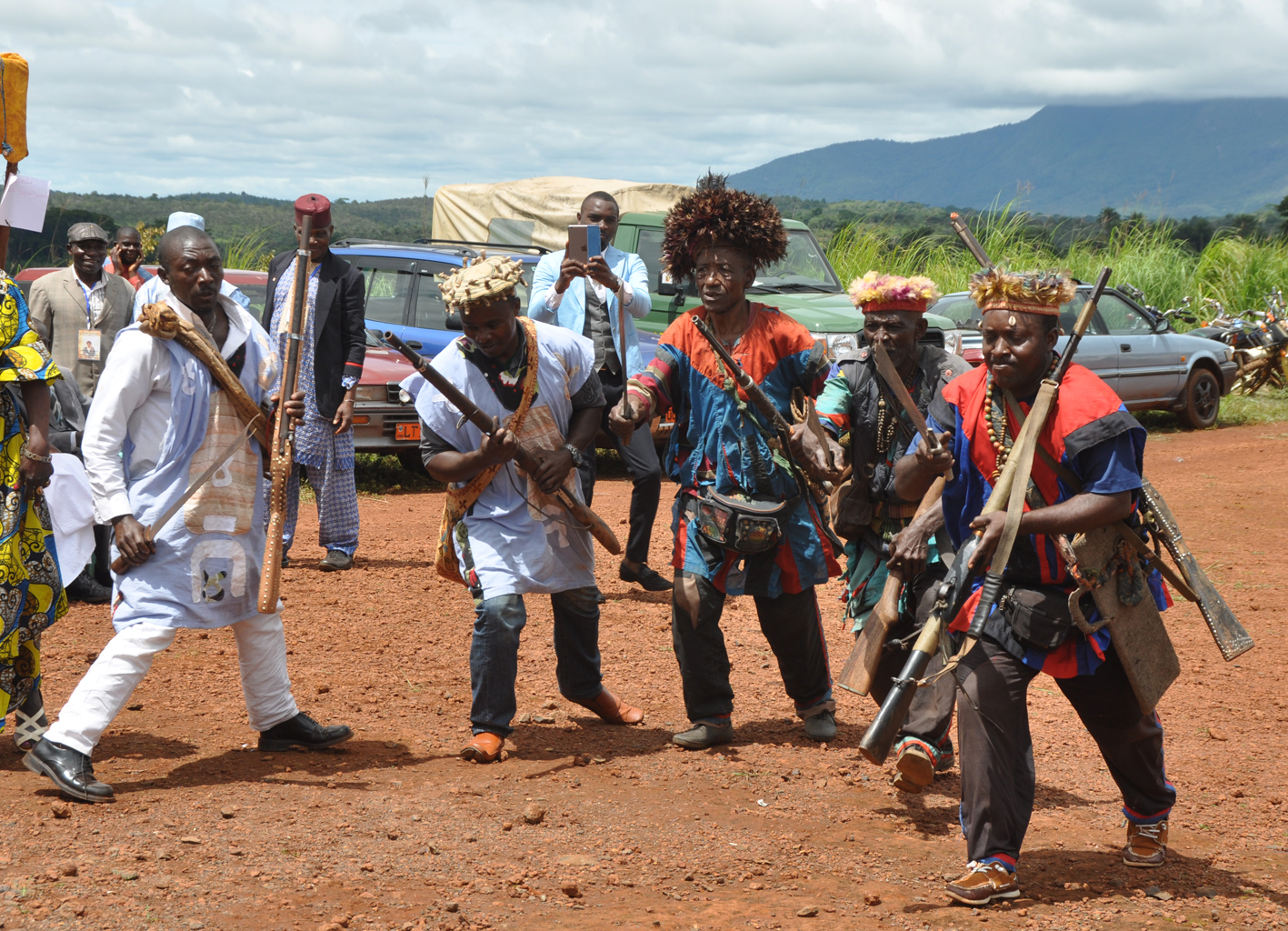
Hair Styles and head covers

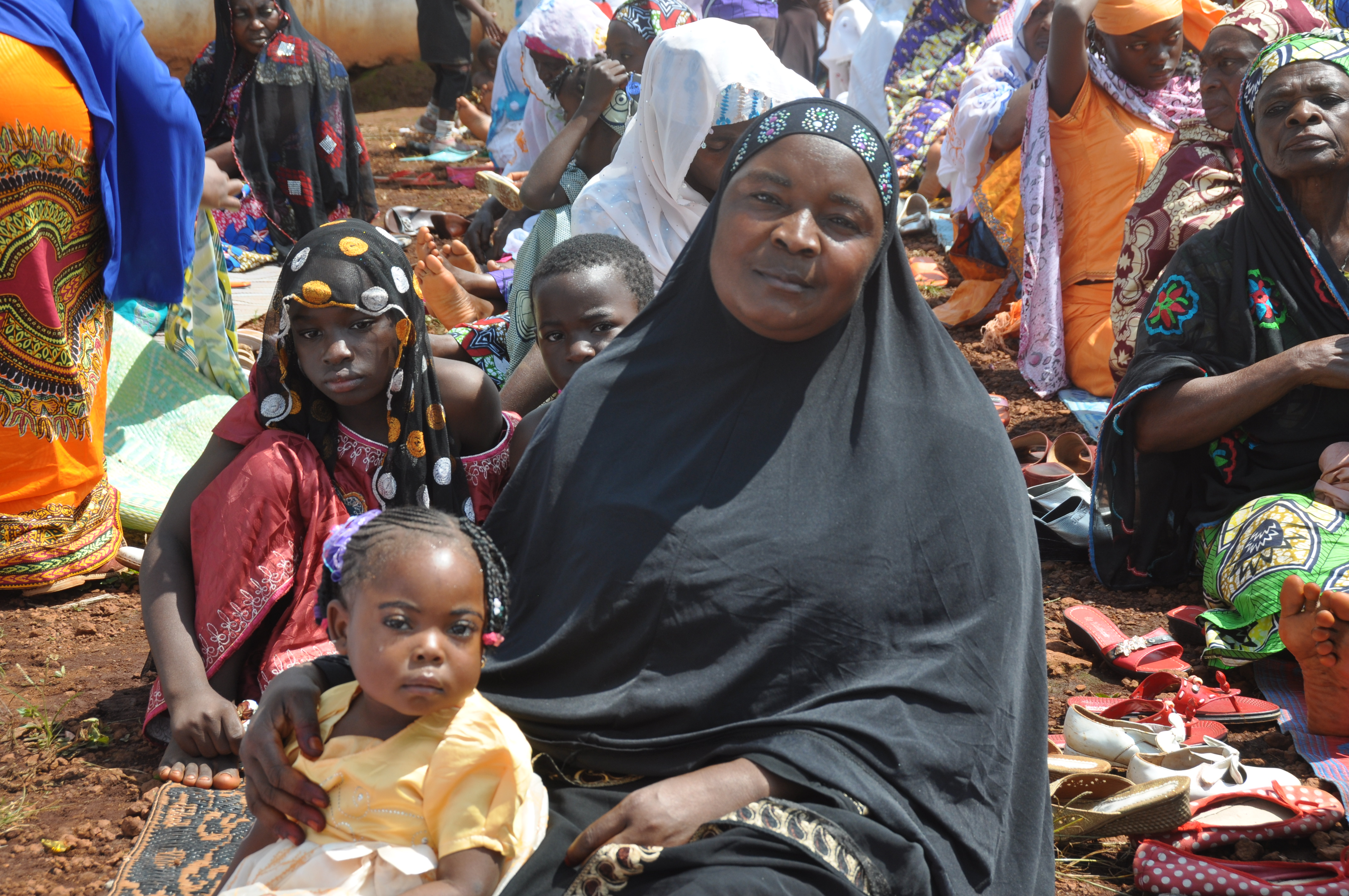

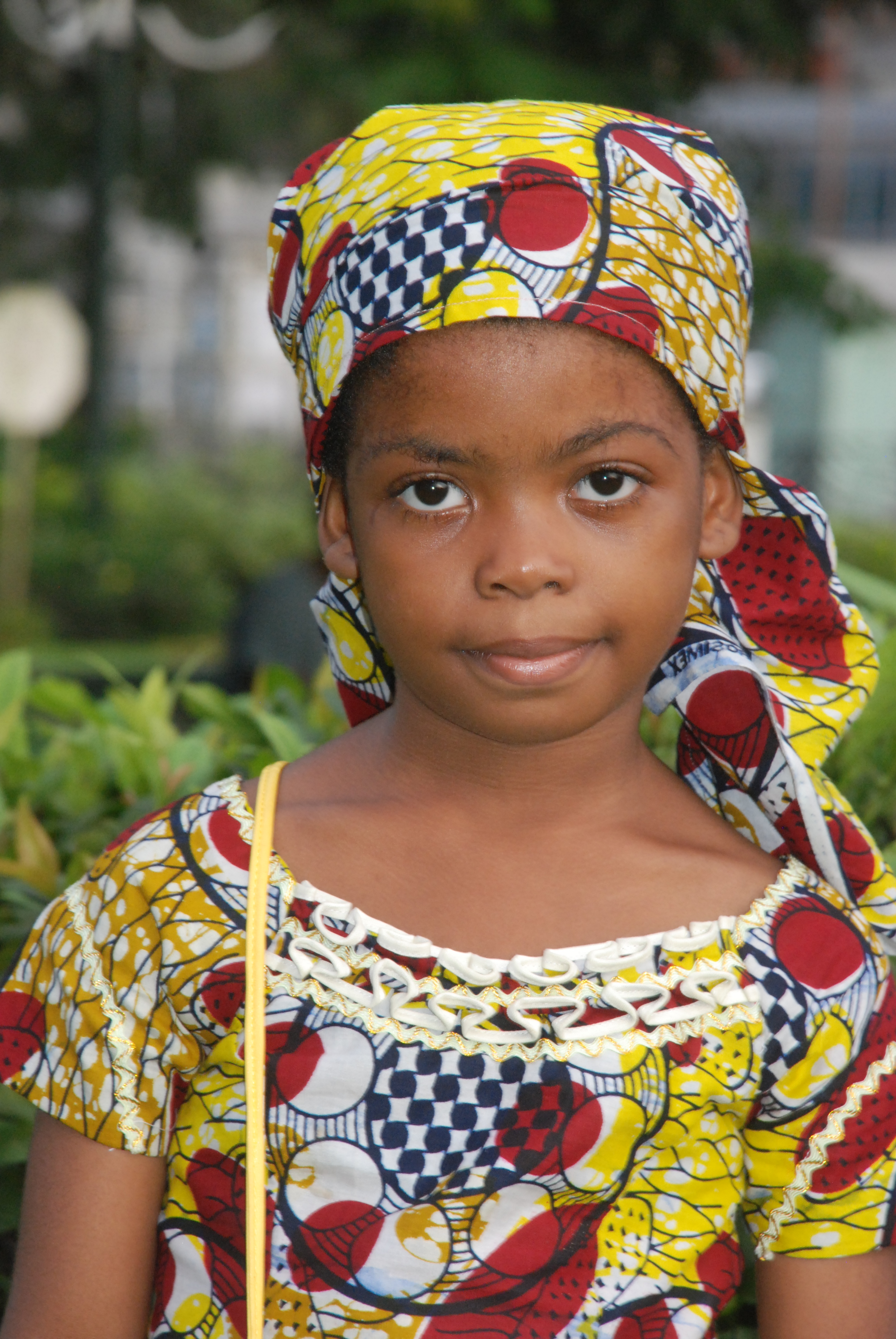

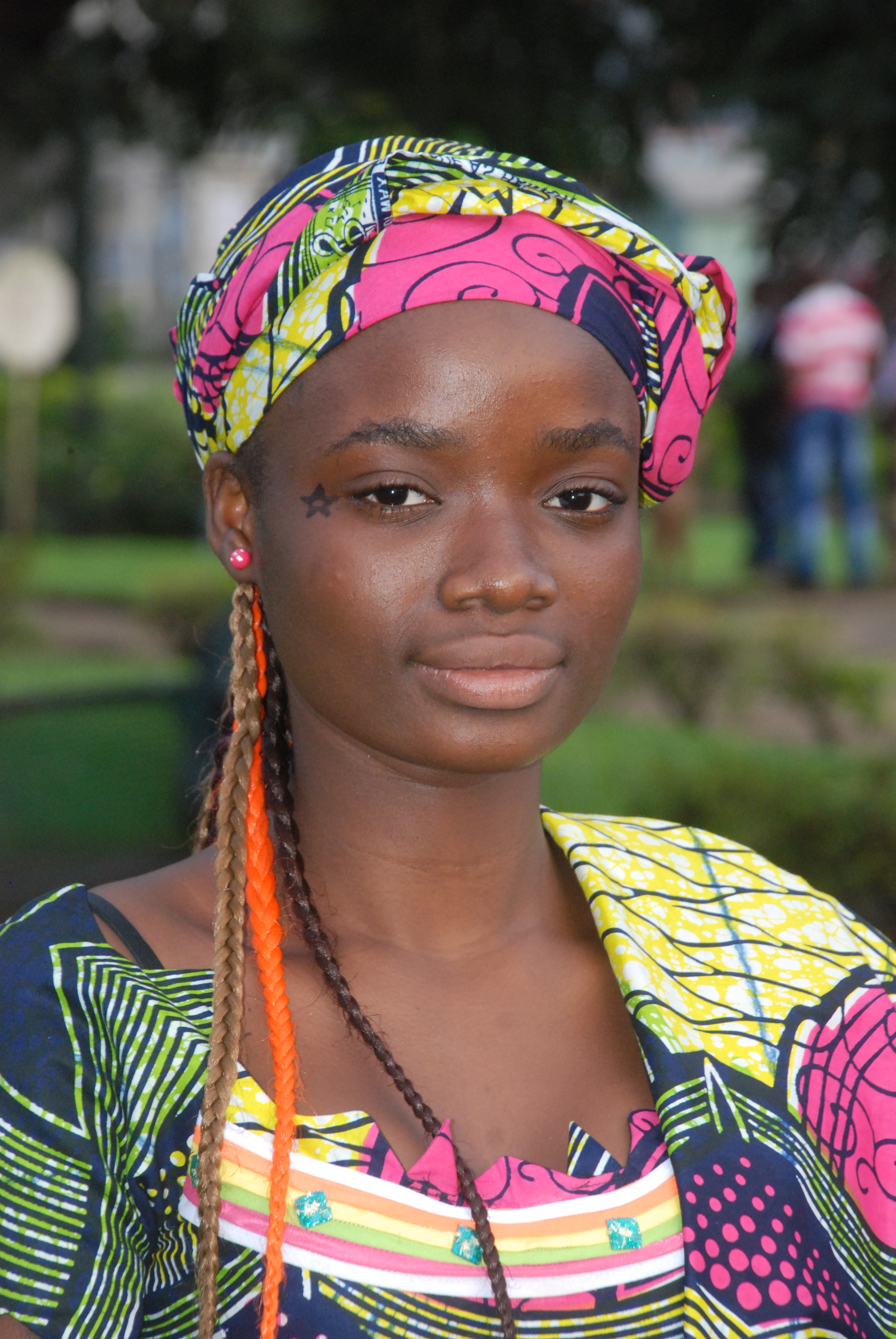

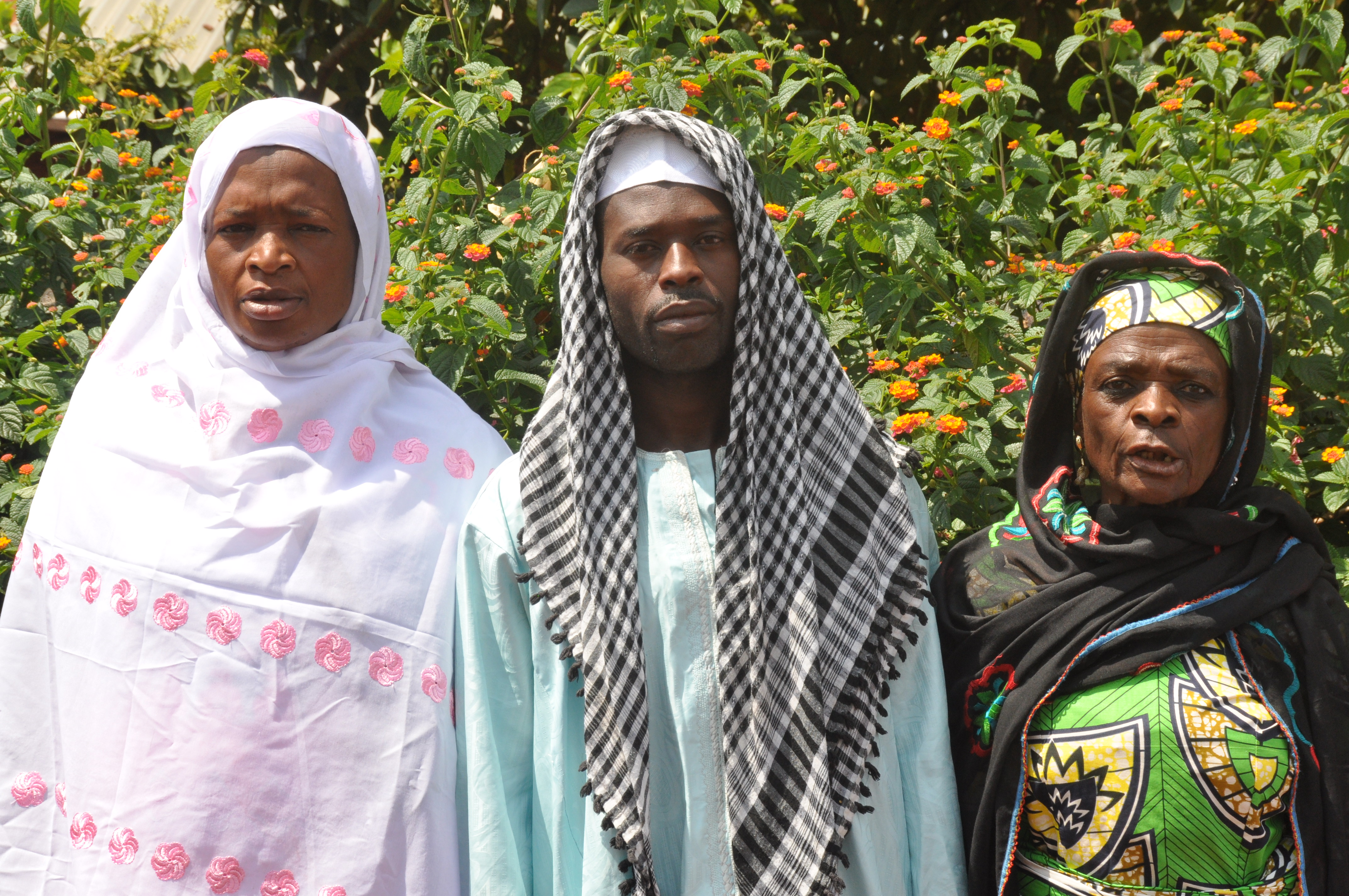

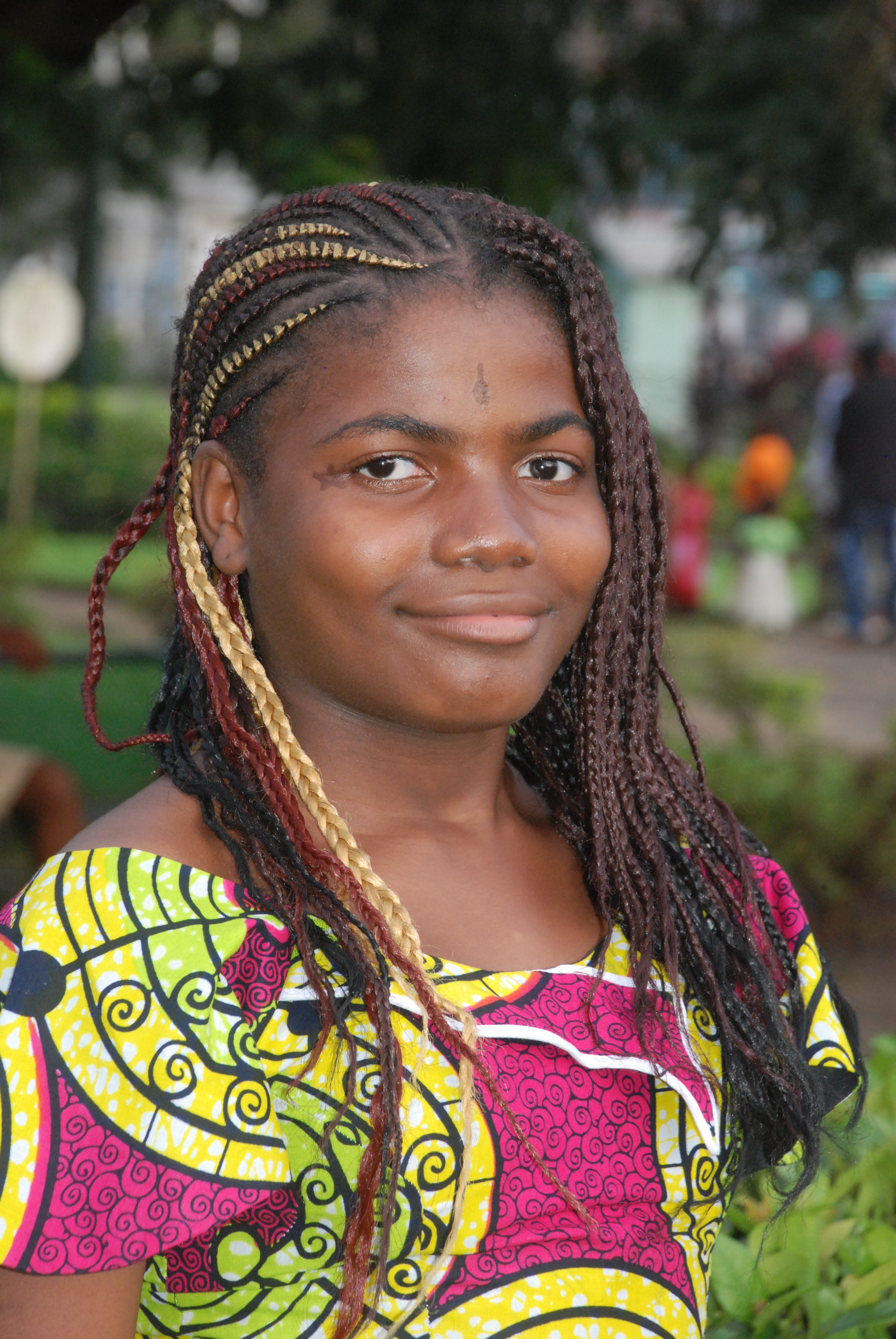

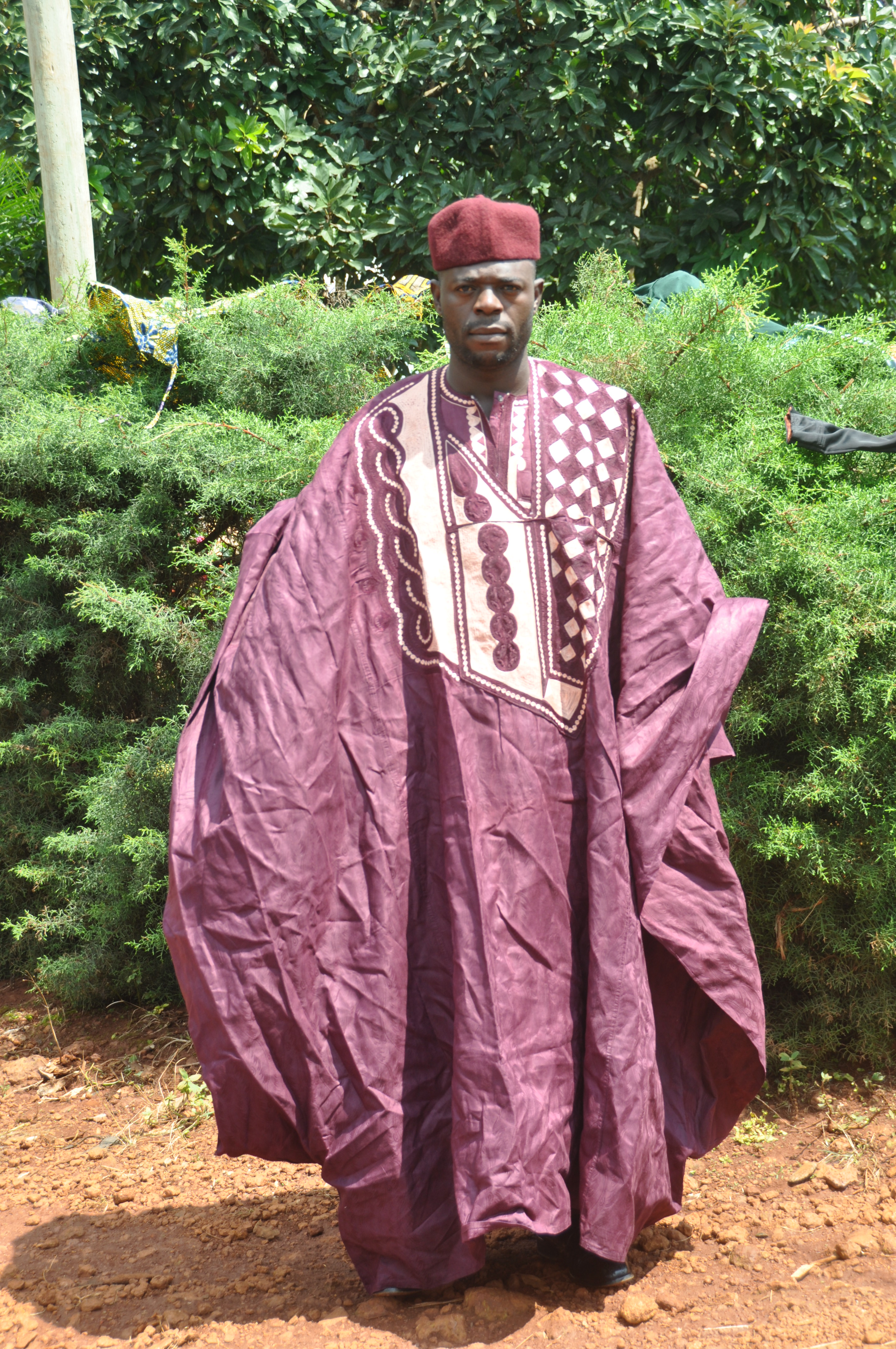

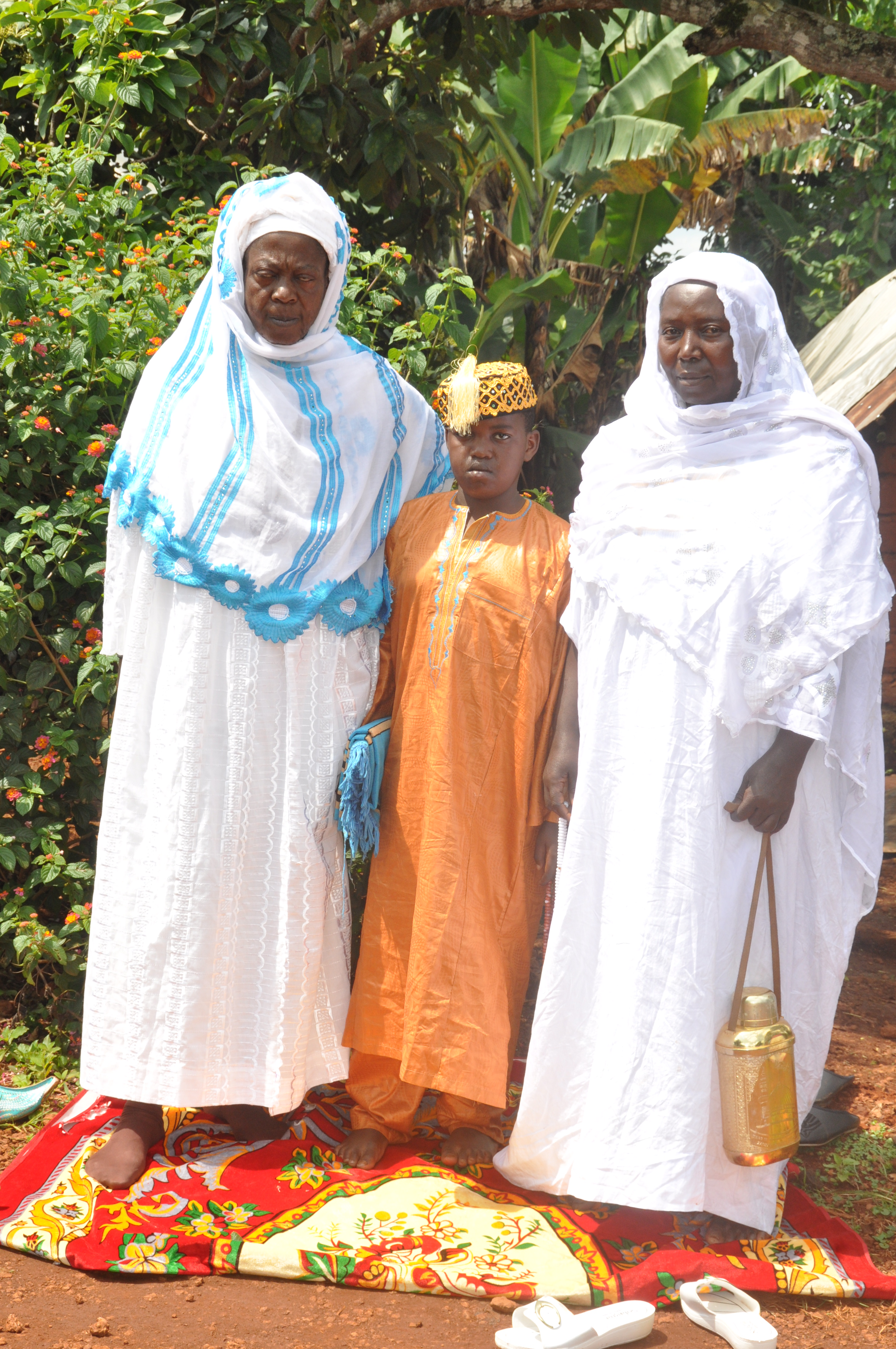

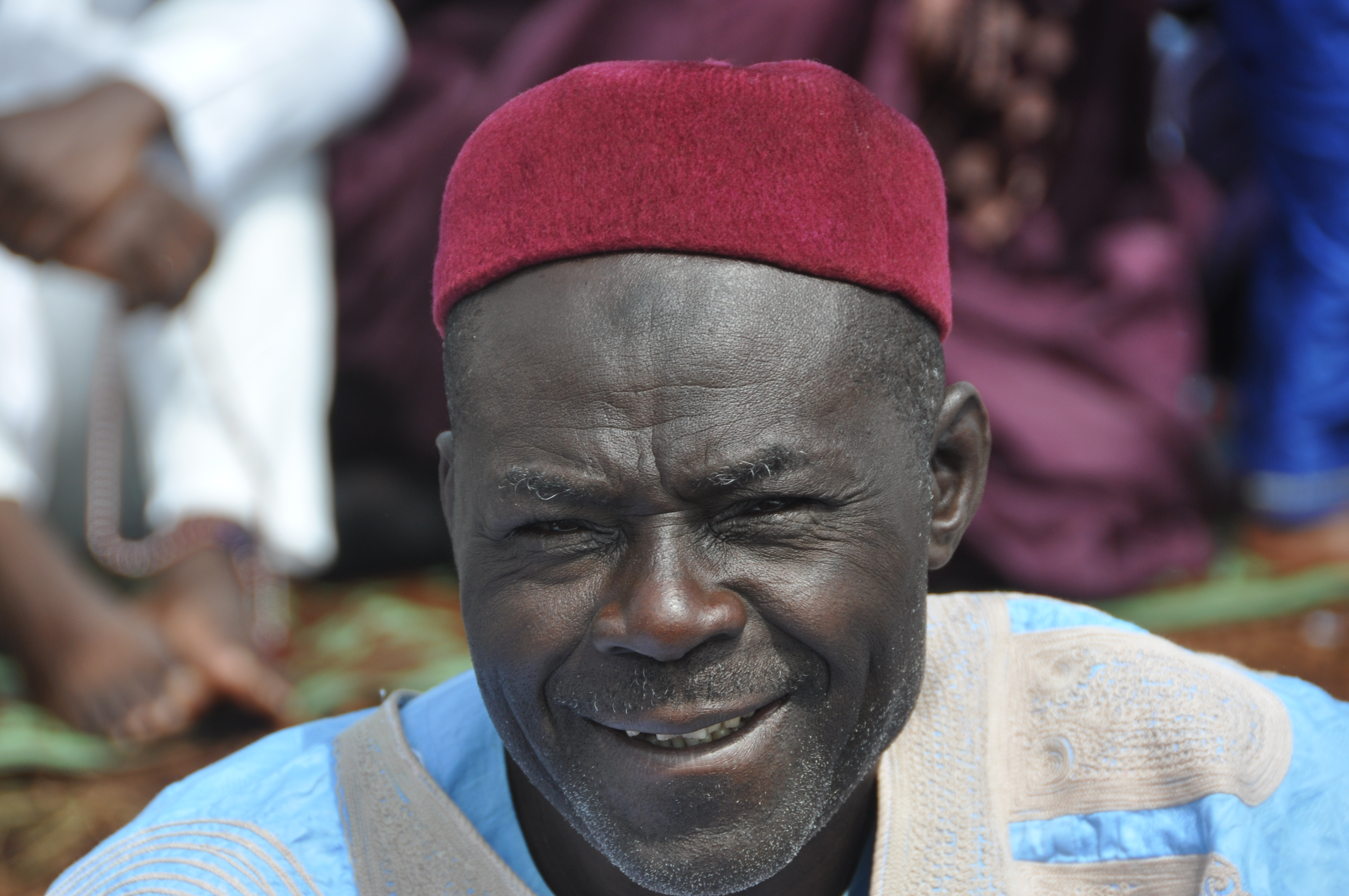

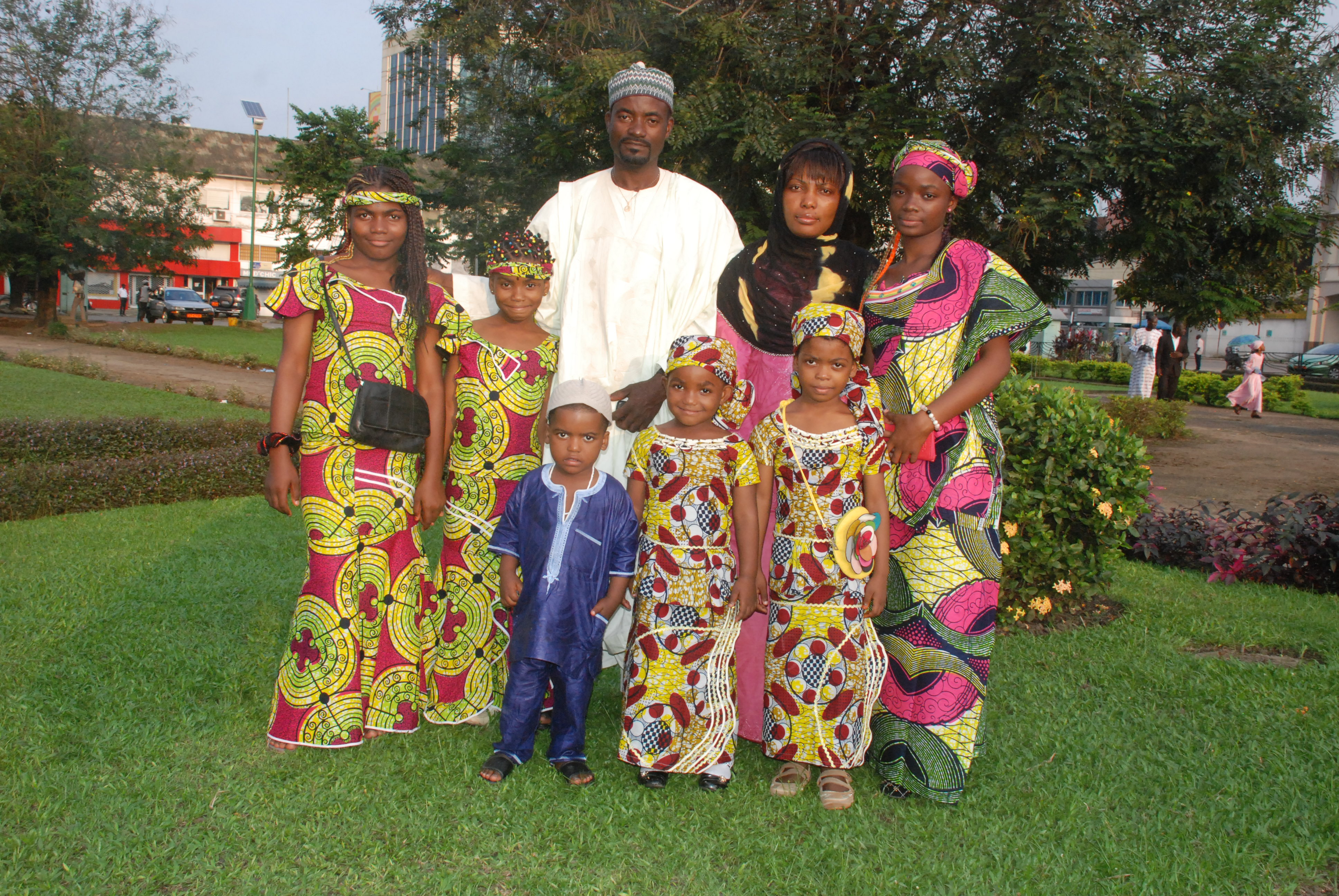

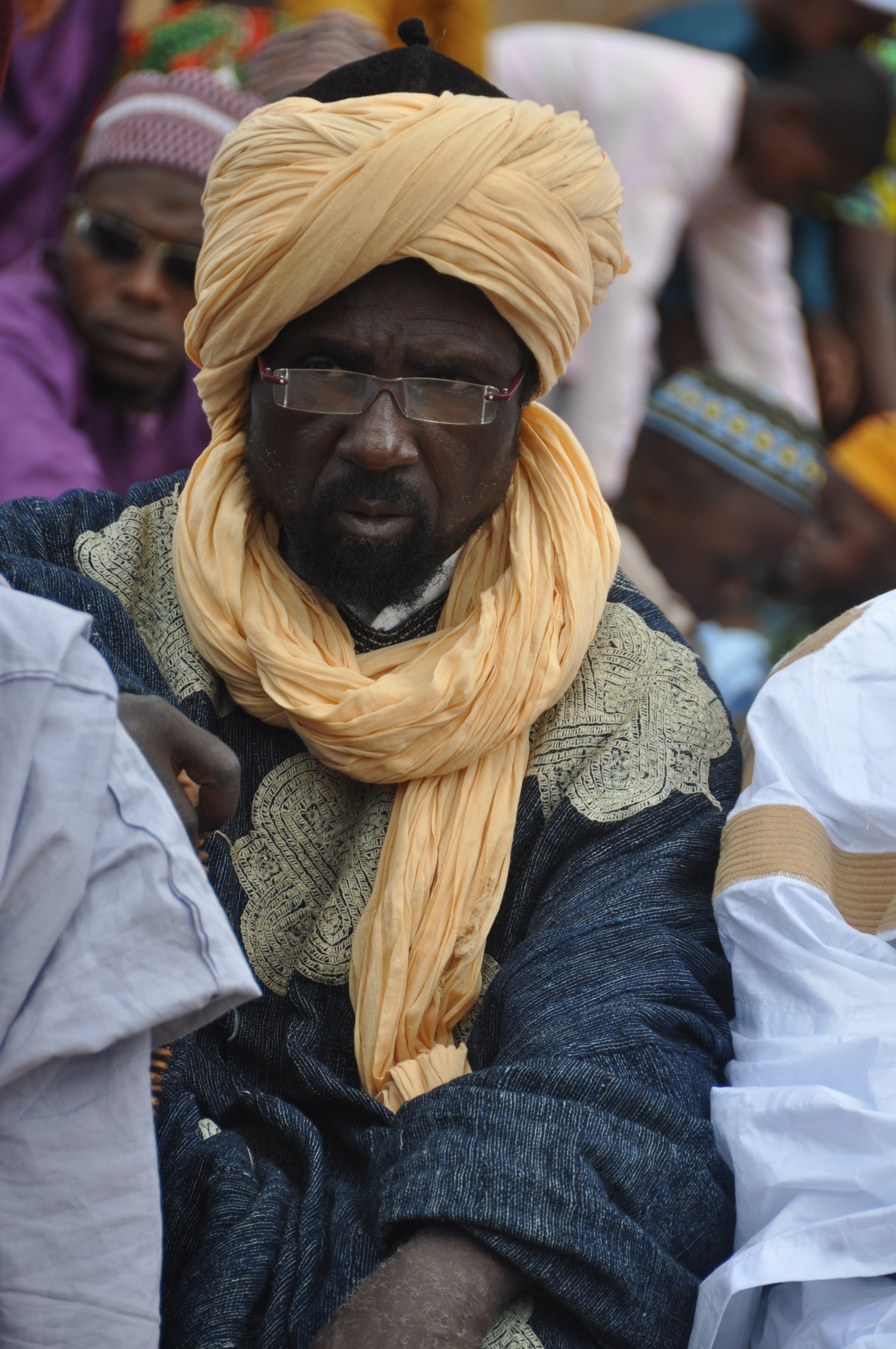

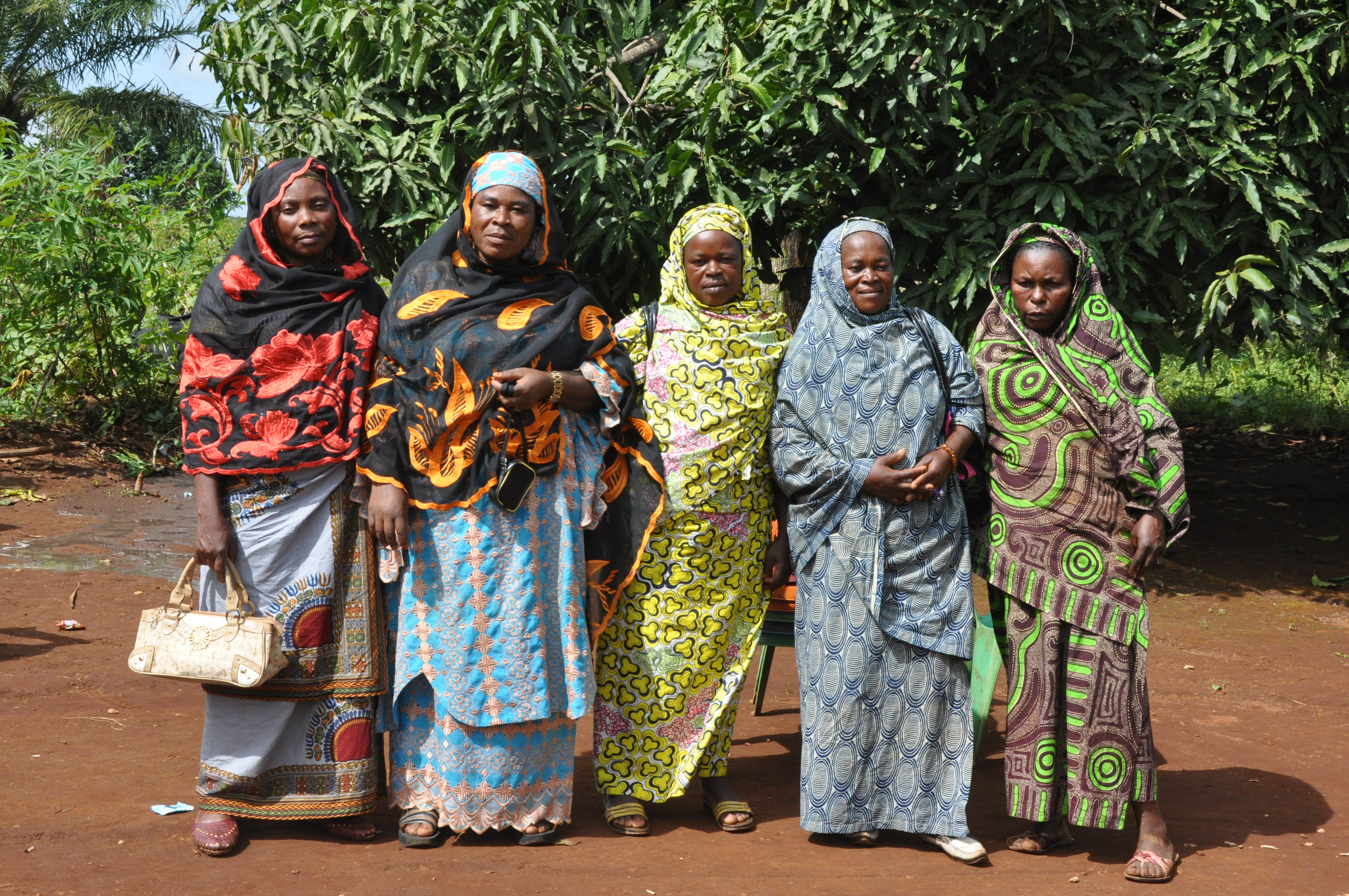

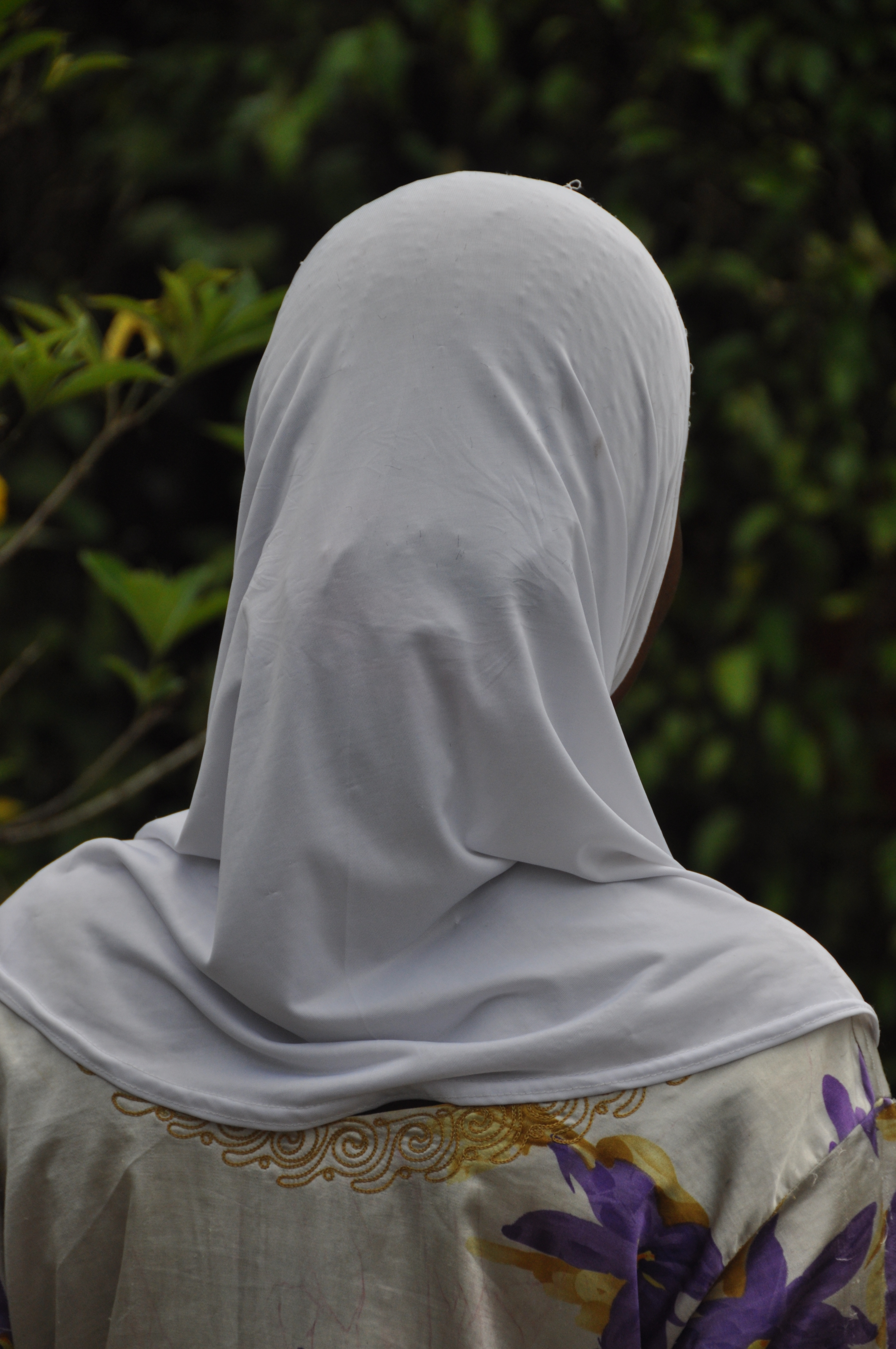

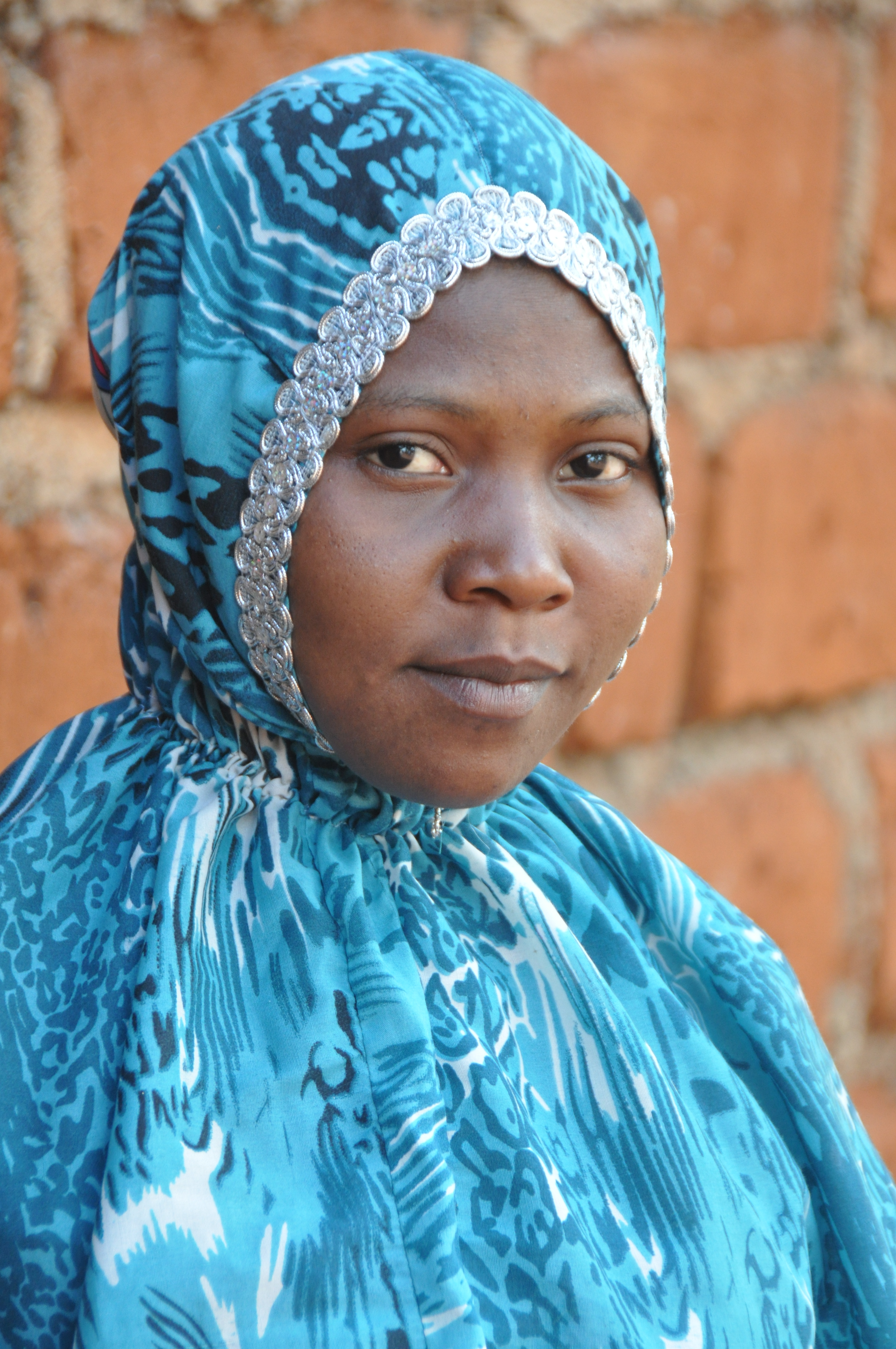

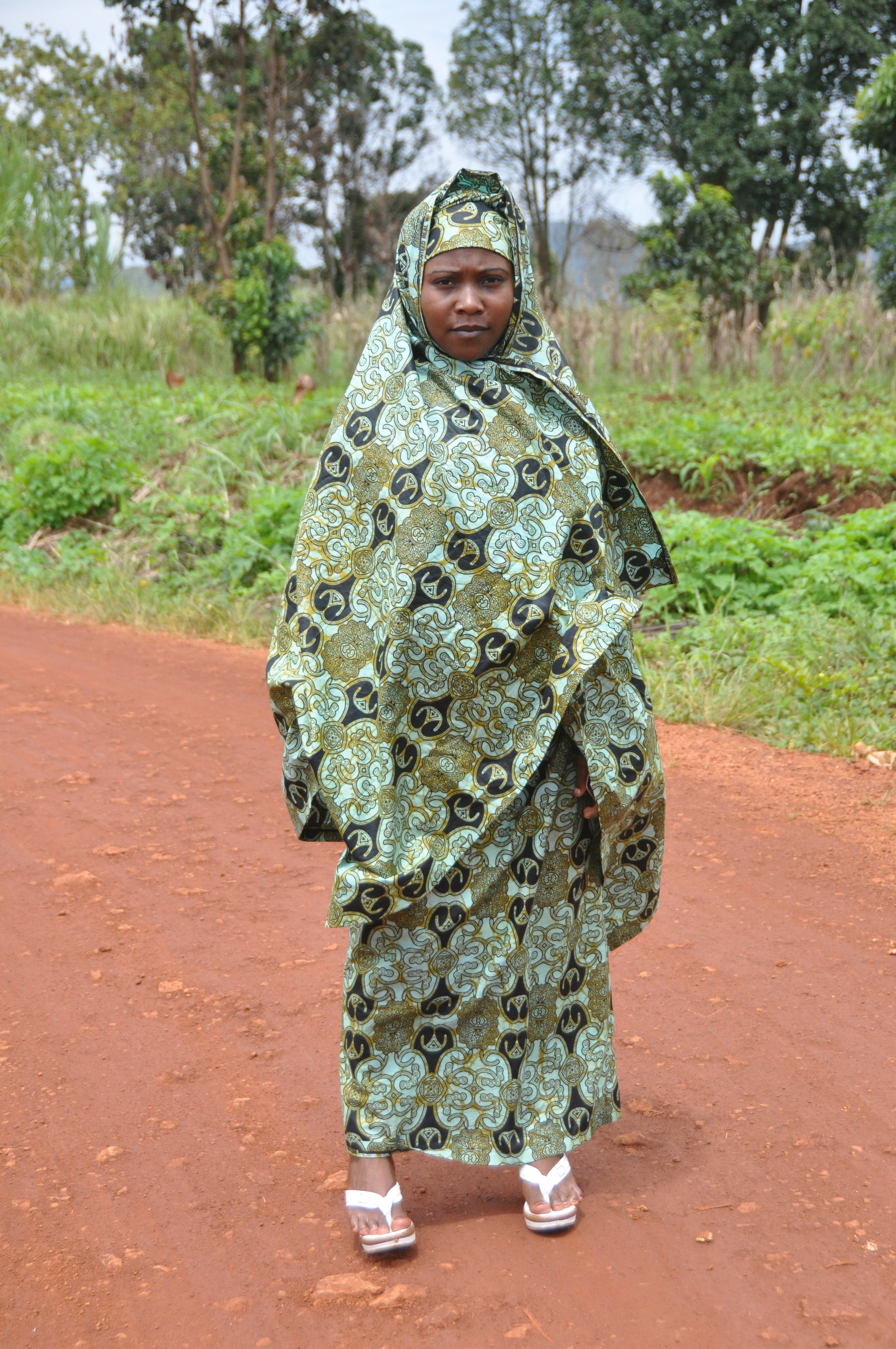

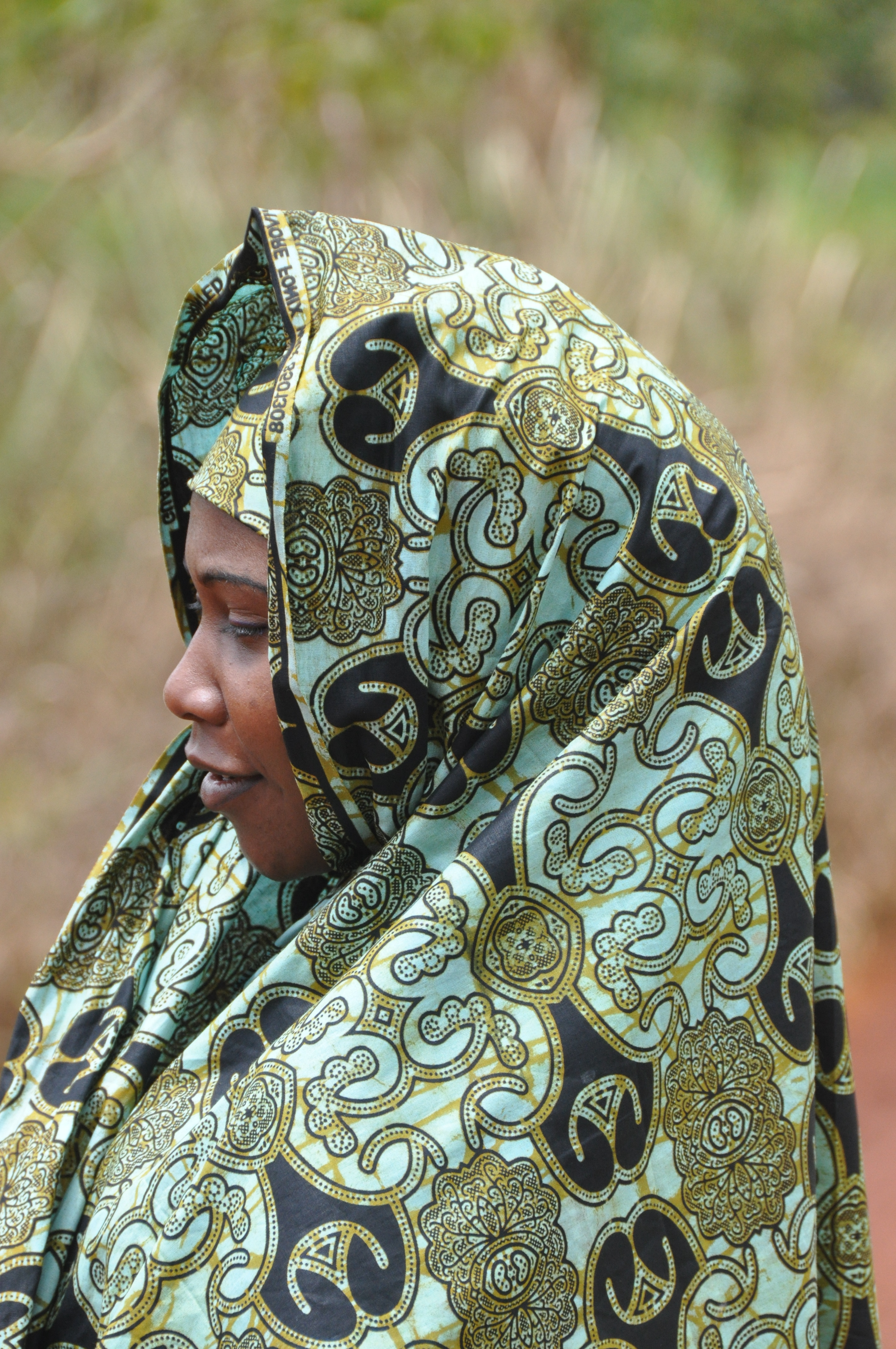

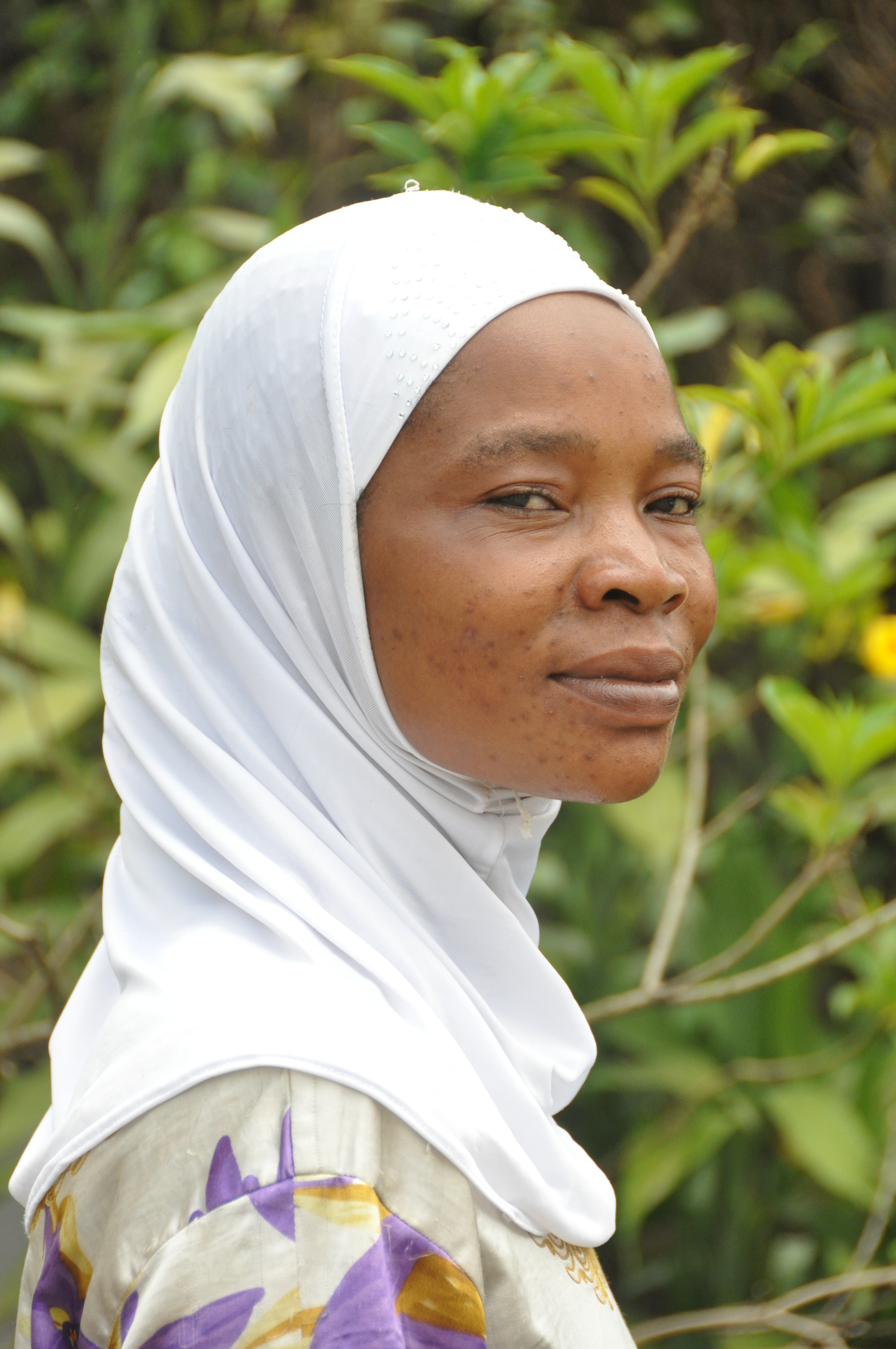

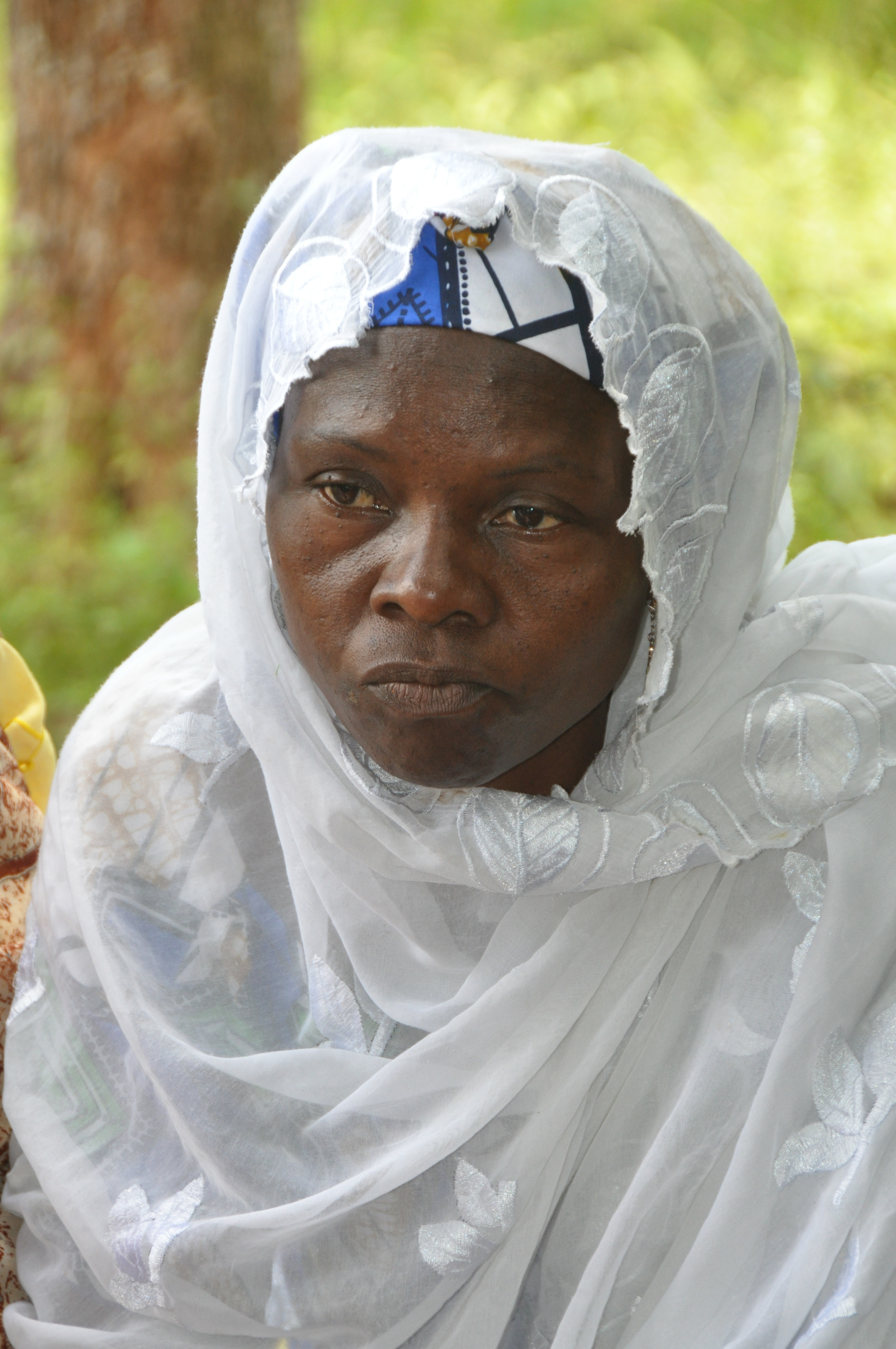

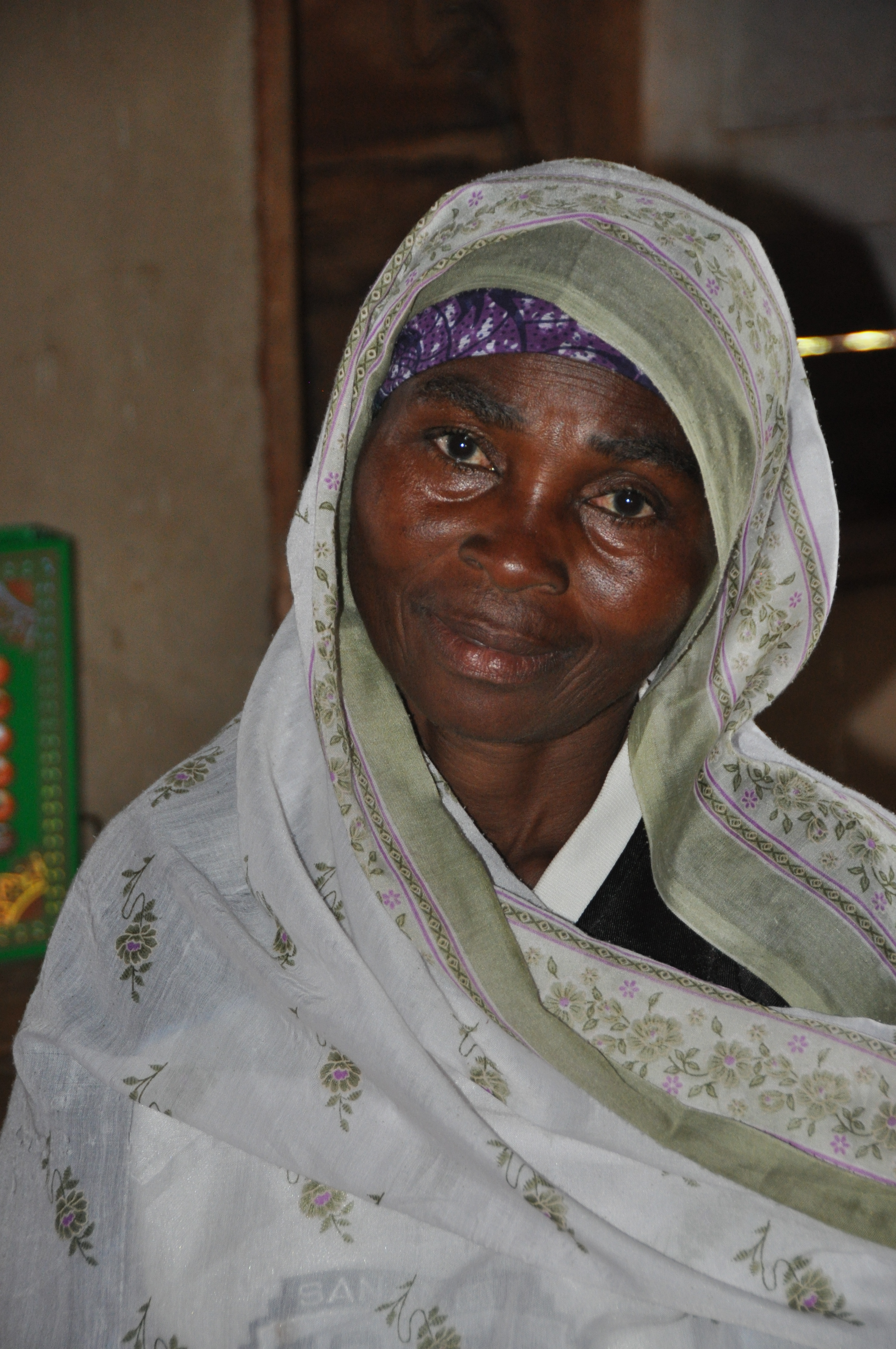

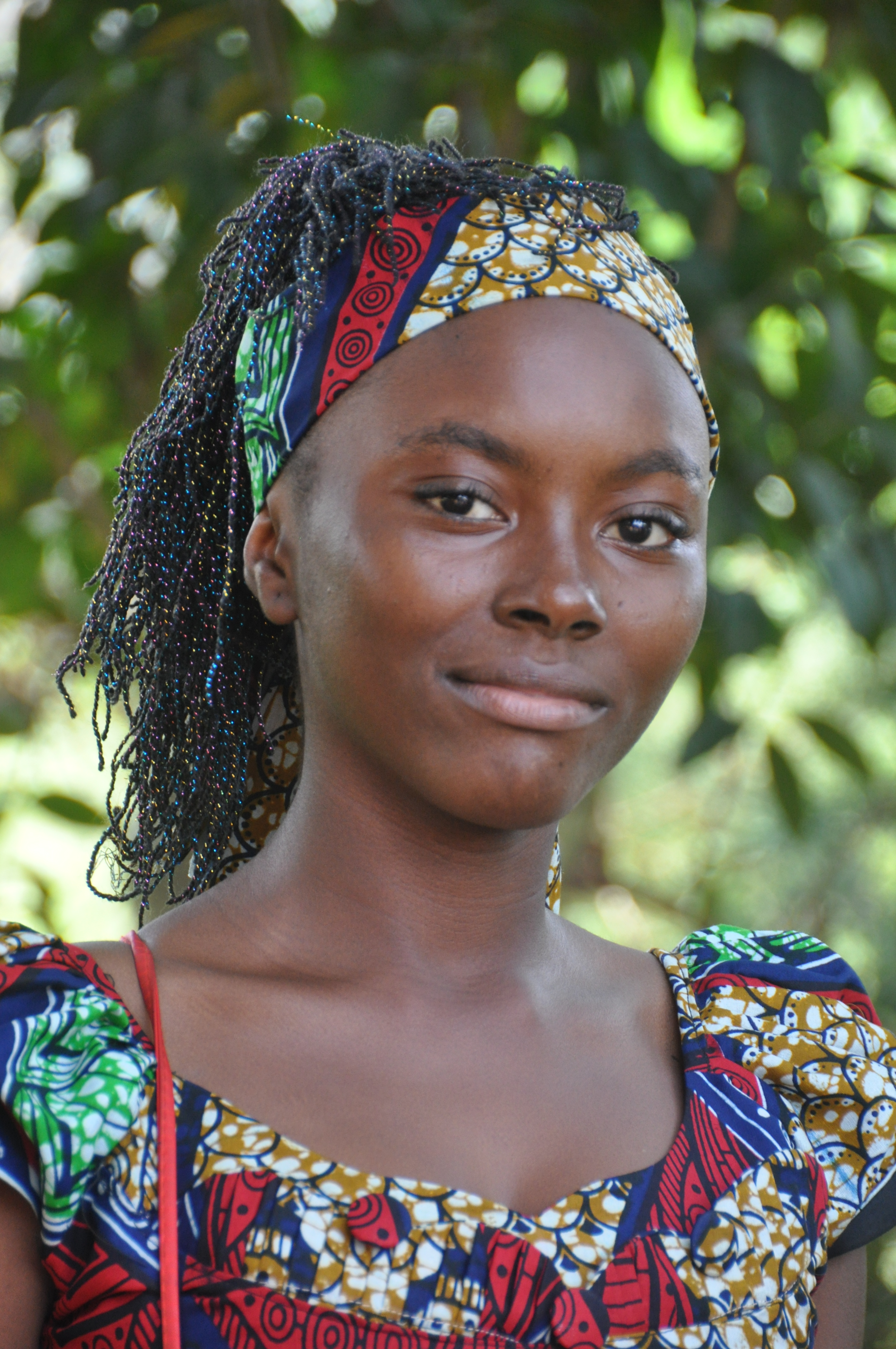

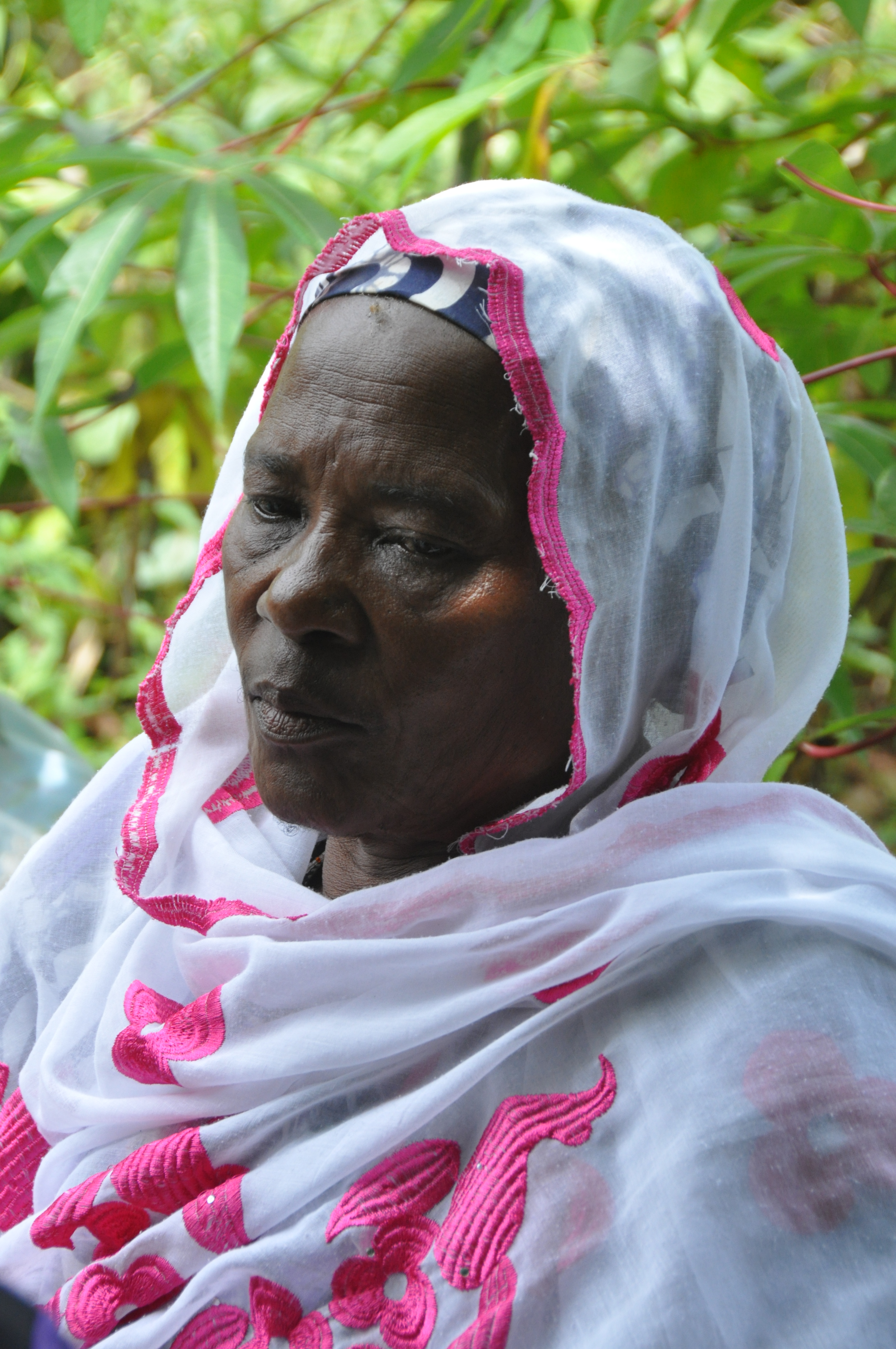

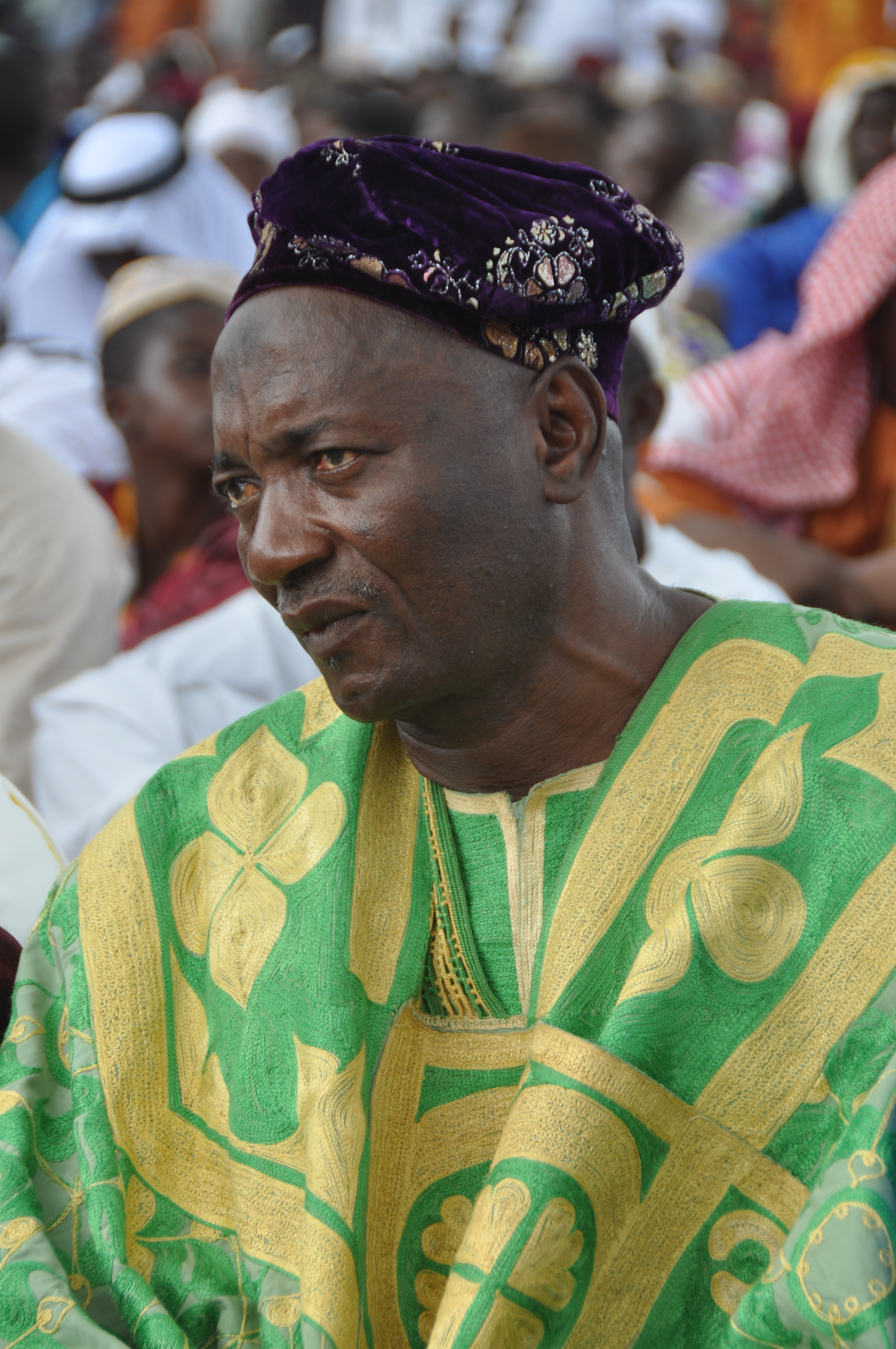

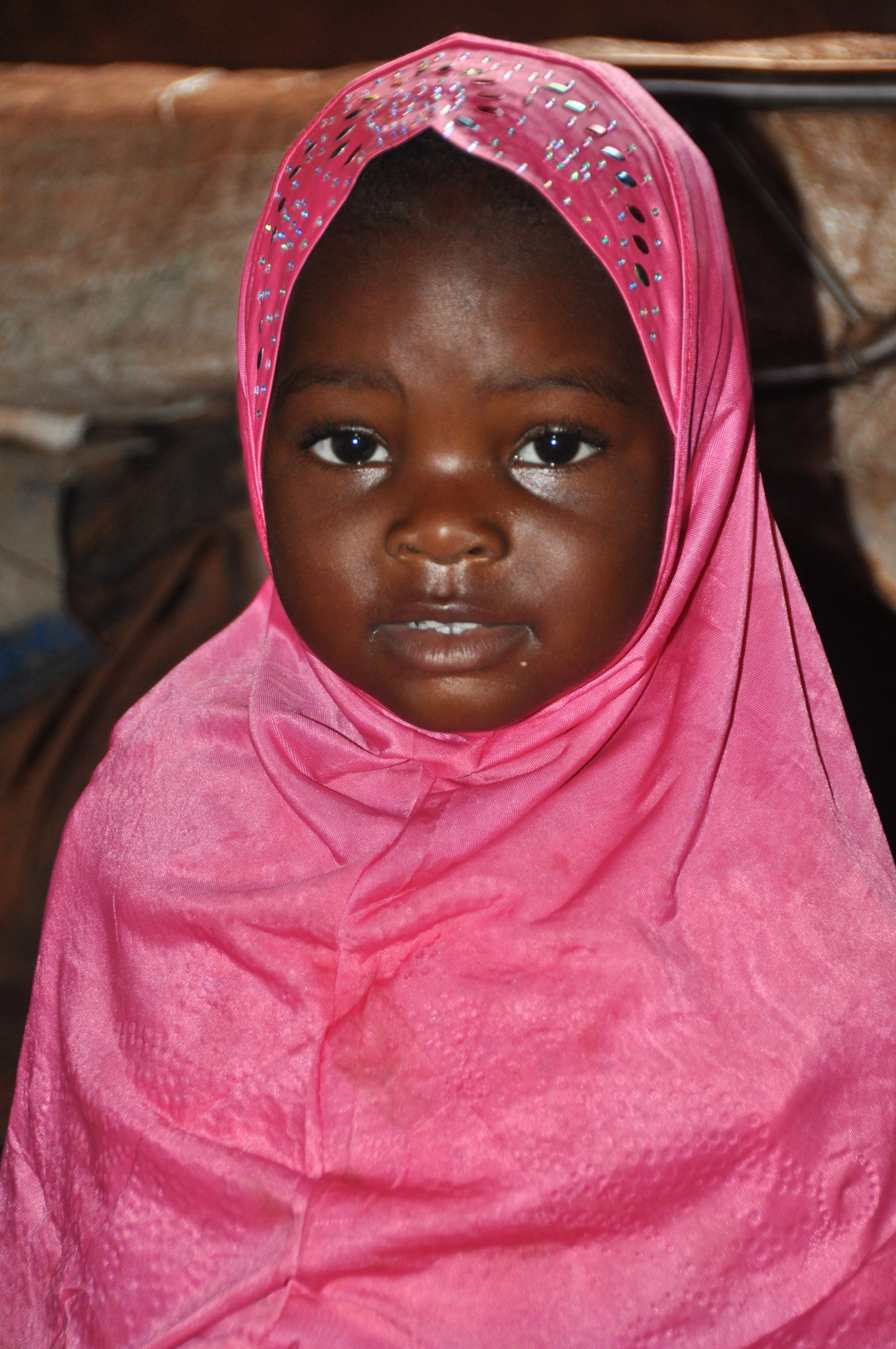

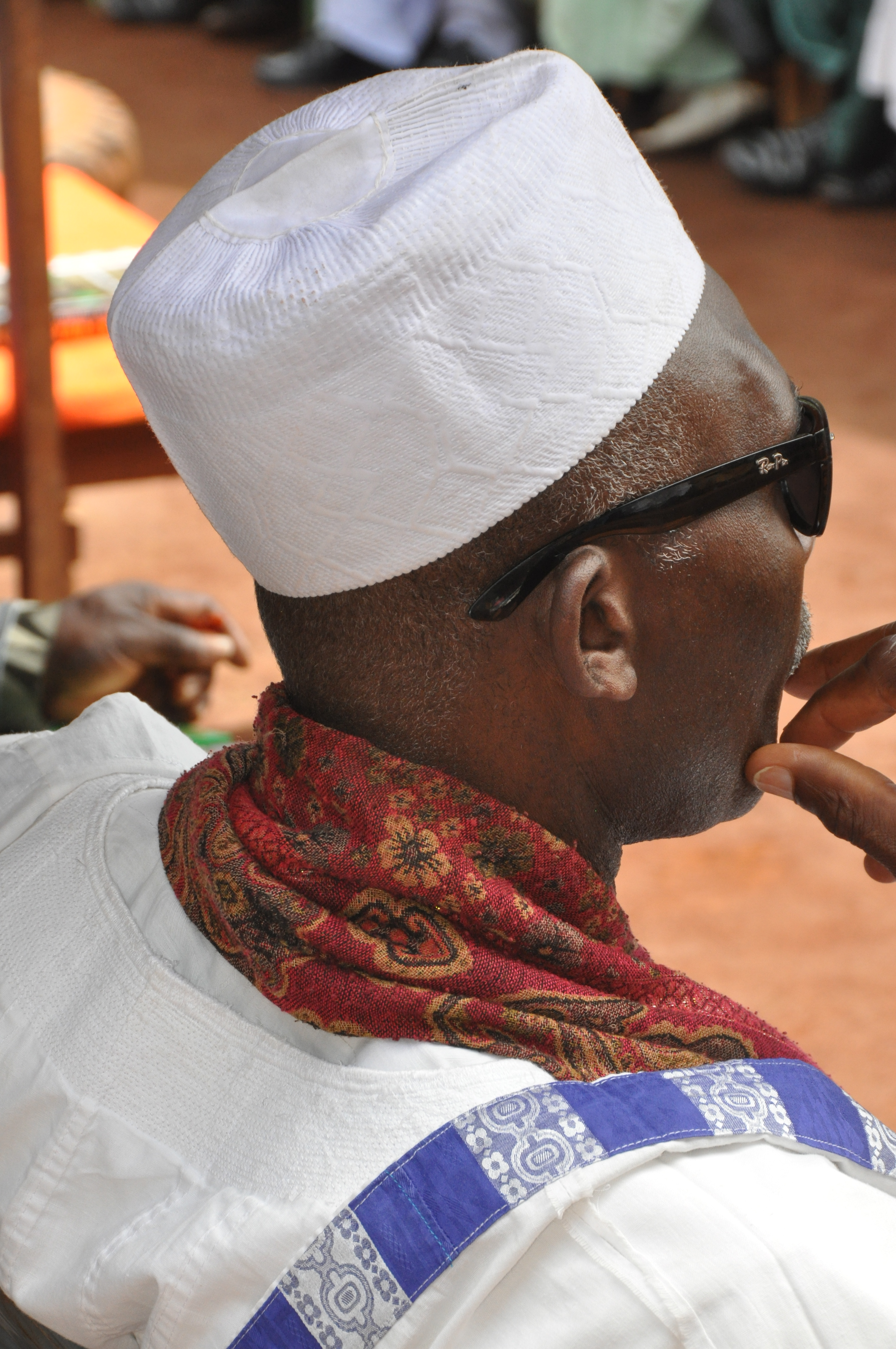
Traditional Activities during Funerals

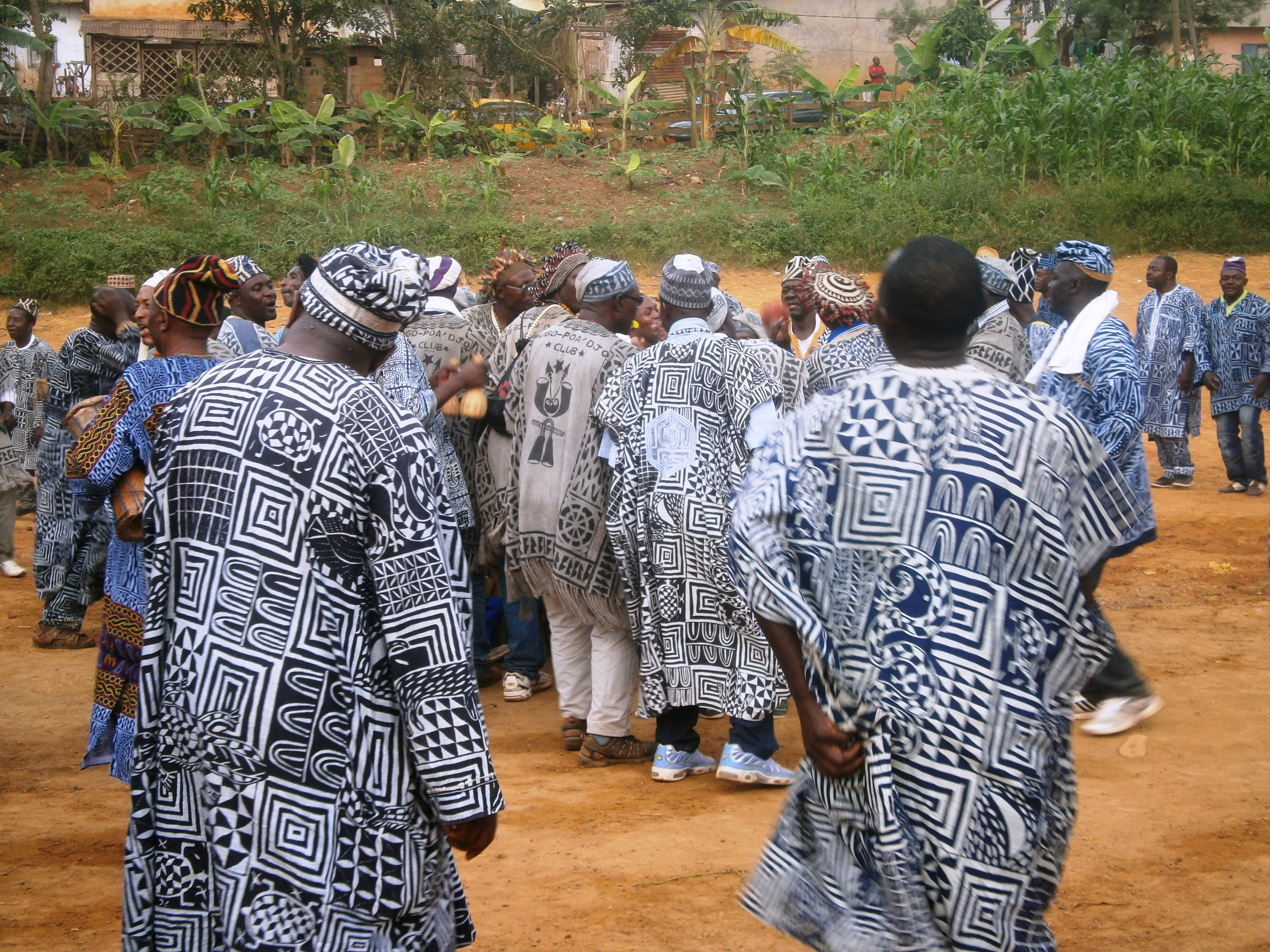

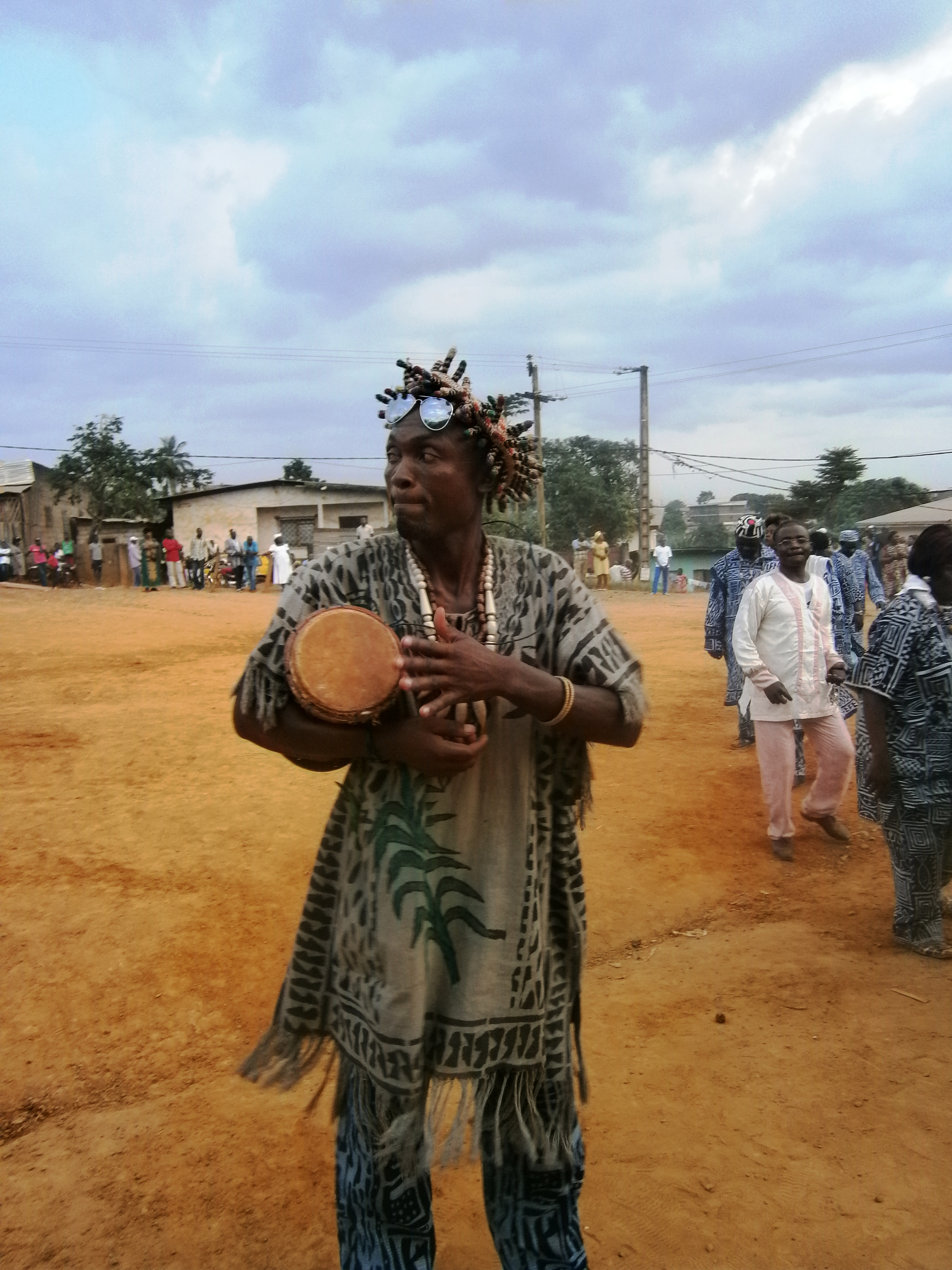

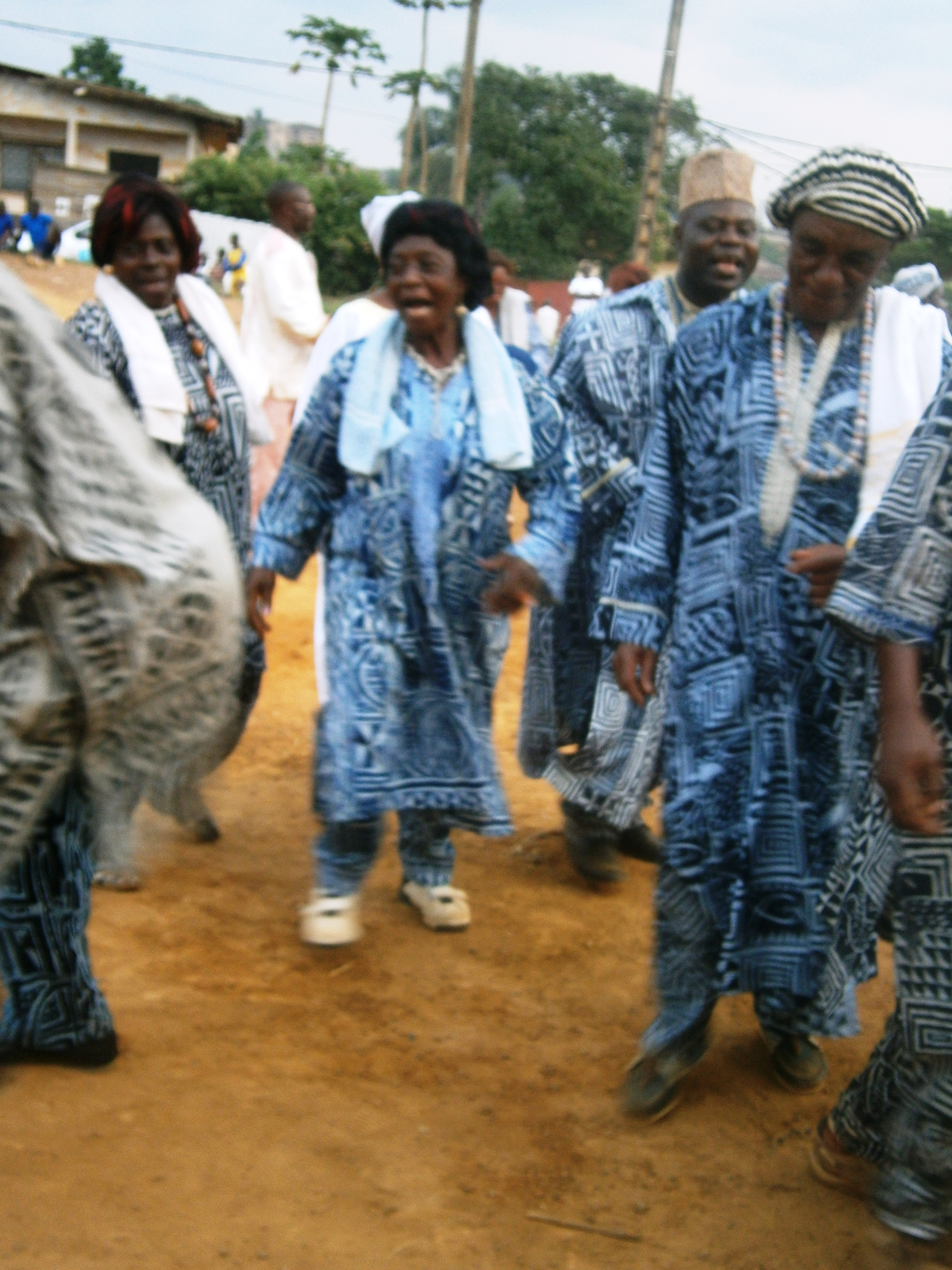

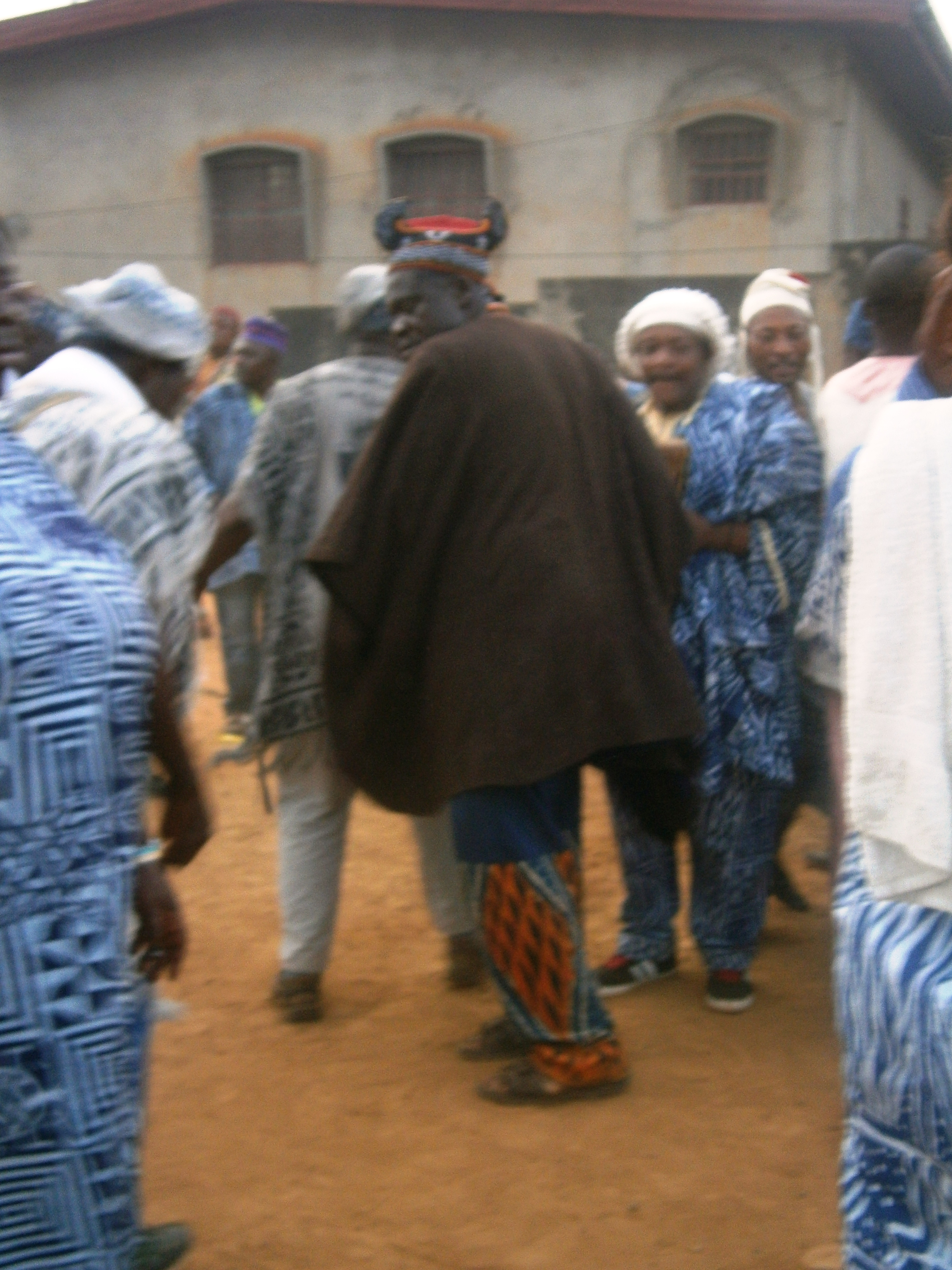

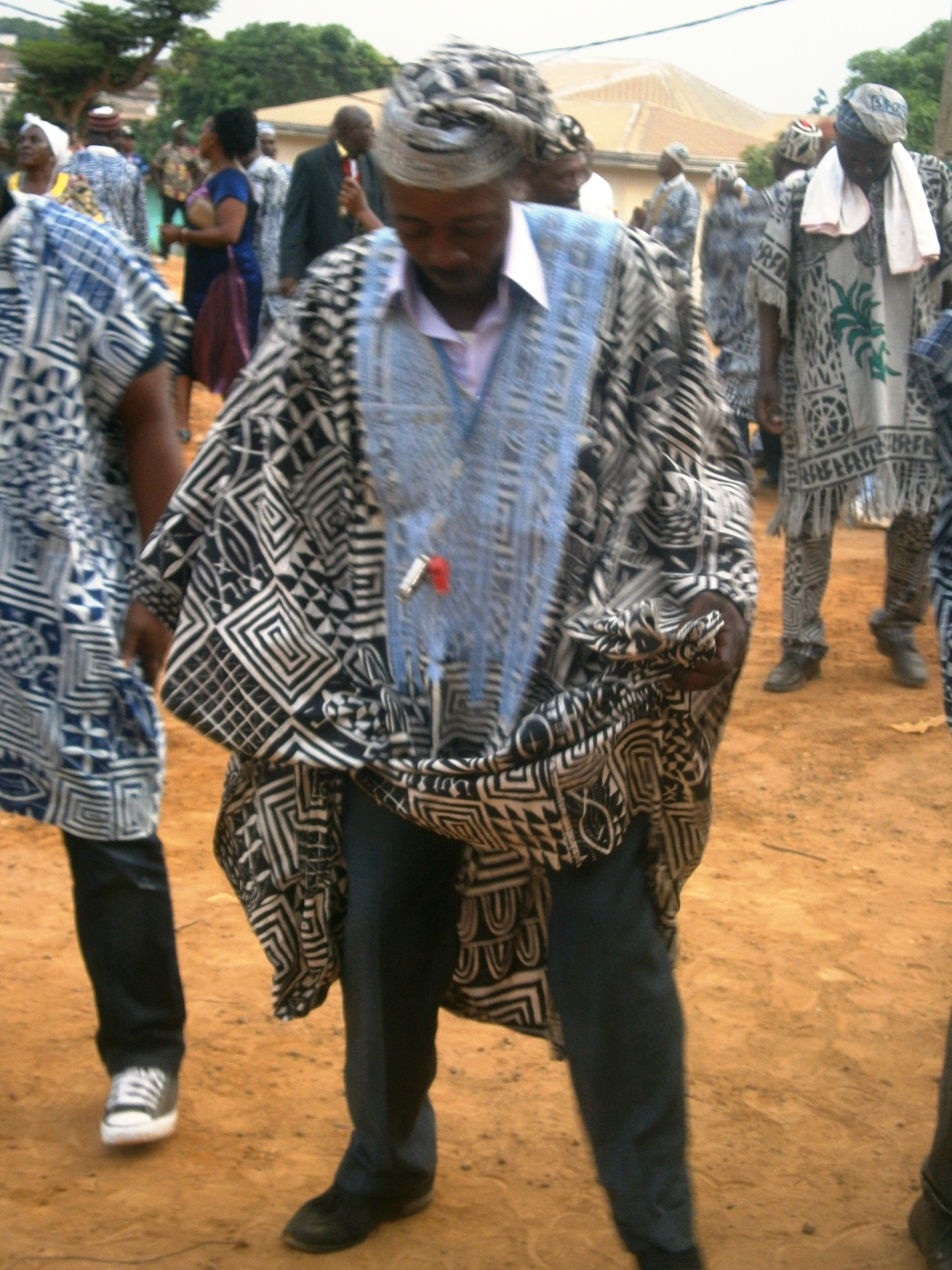

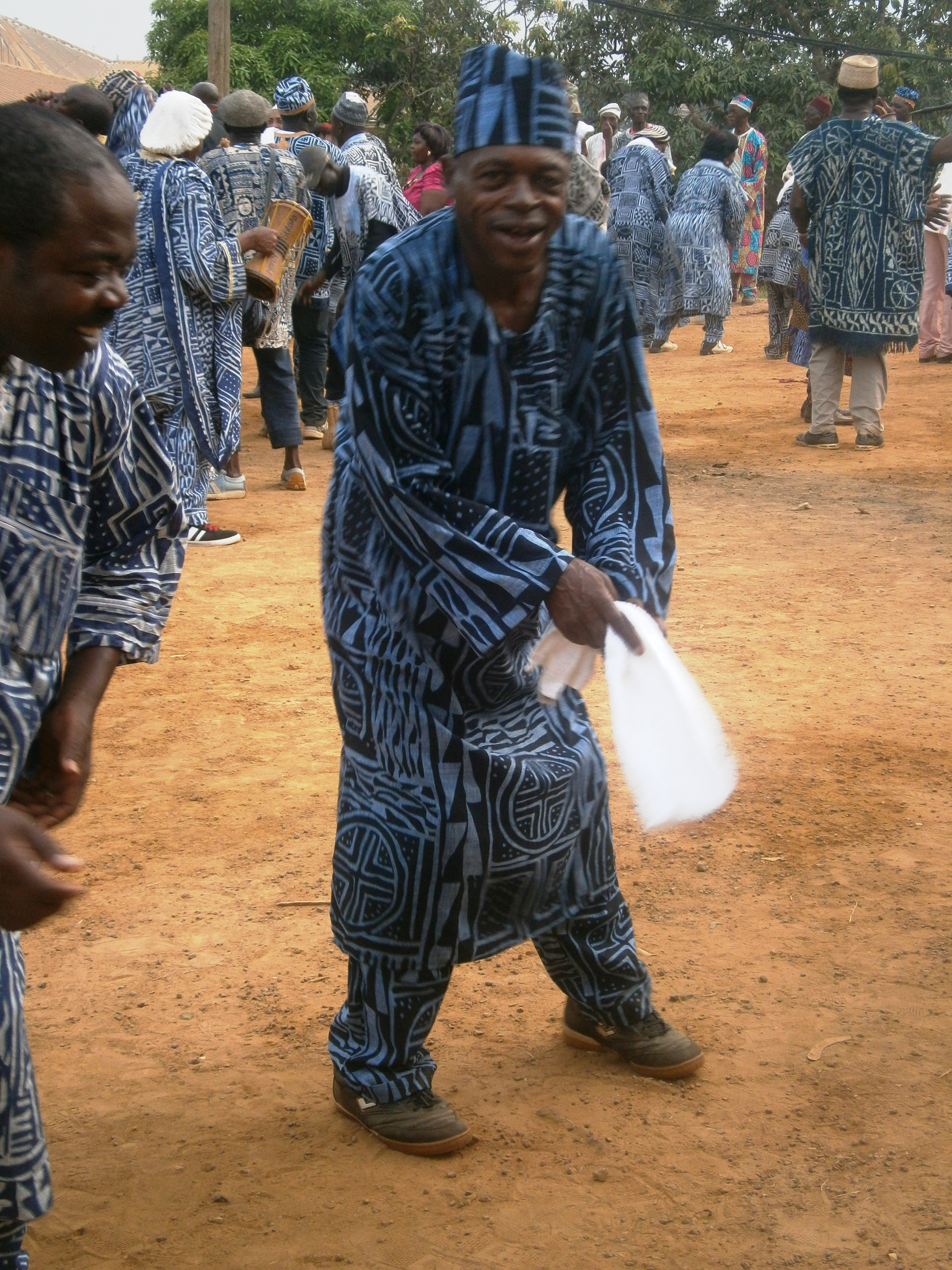

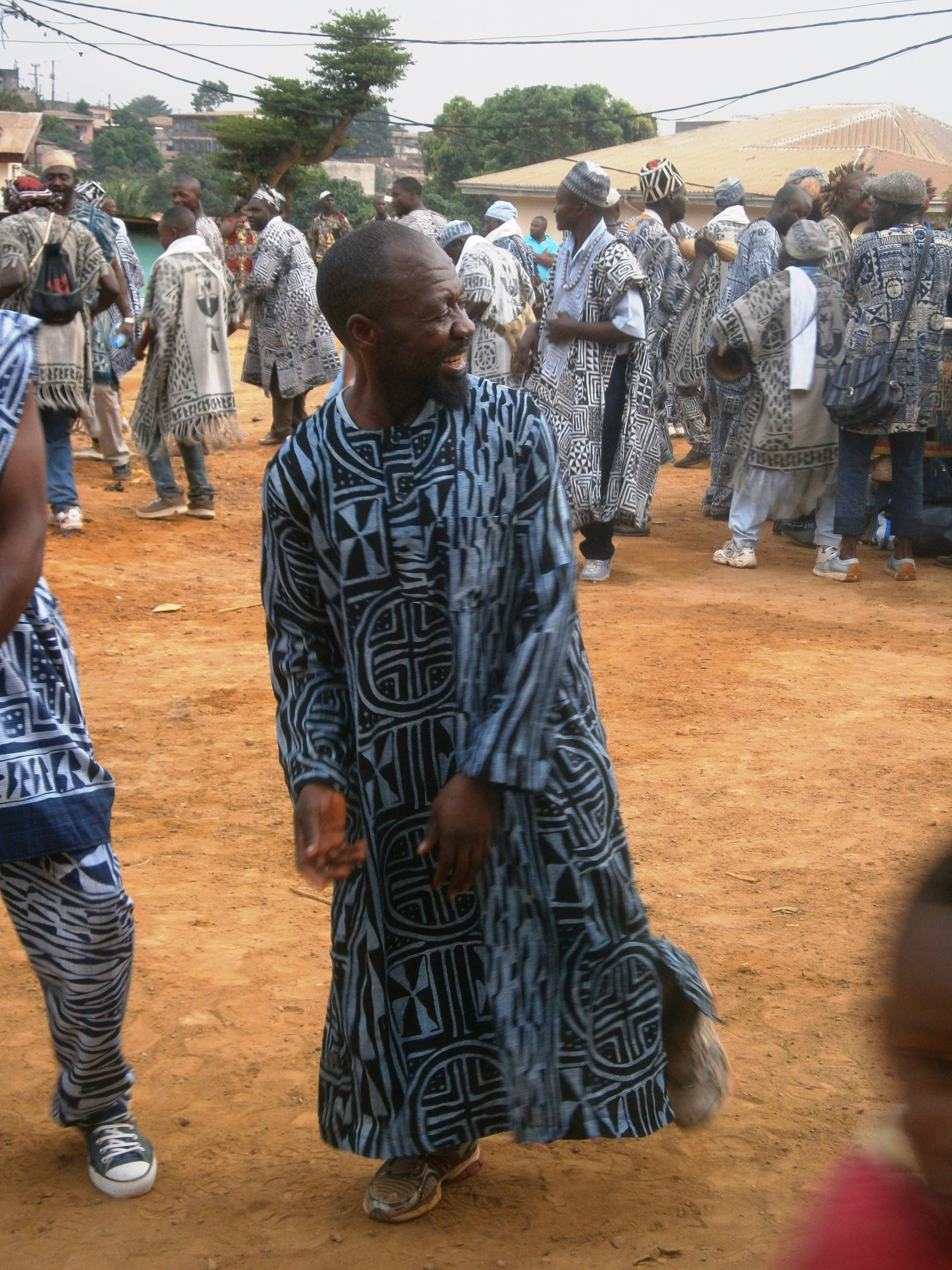

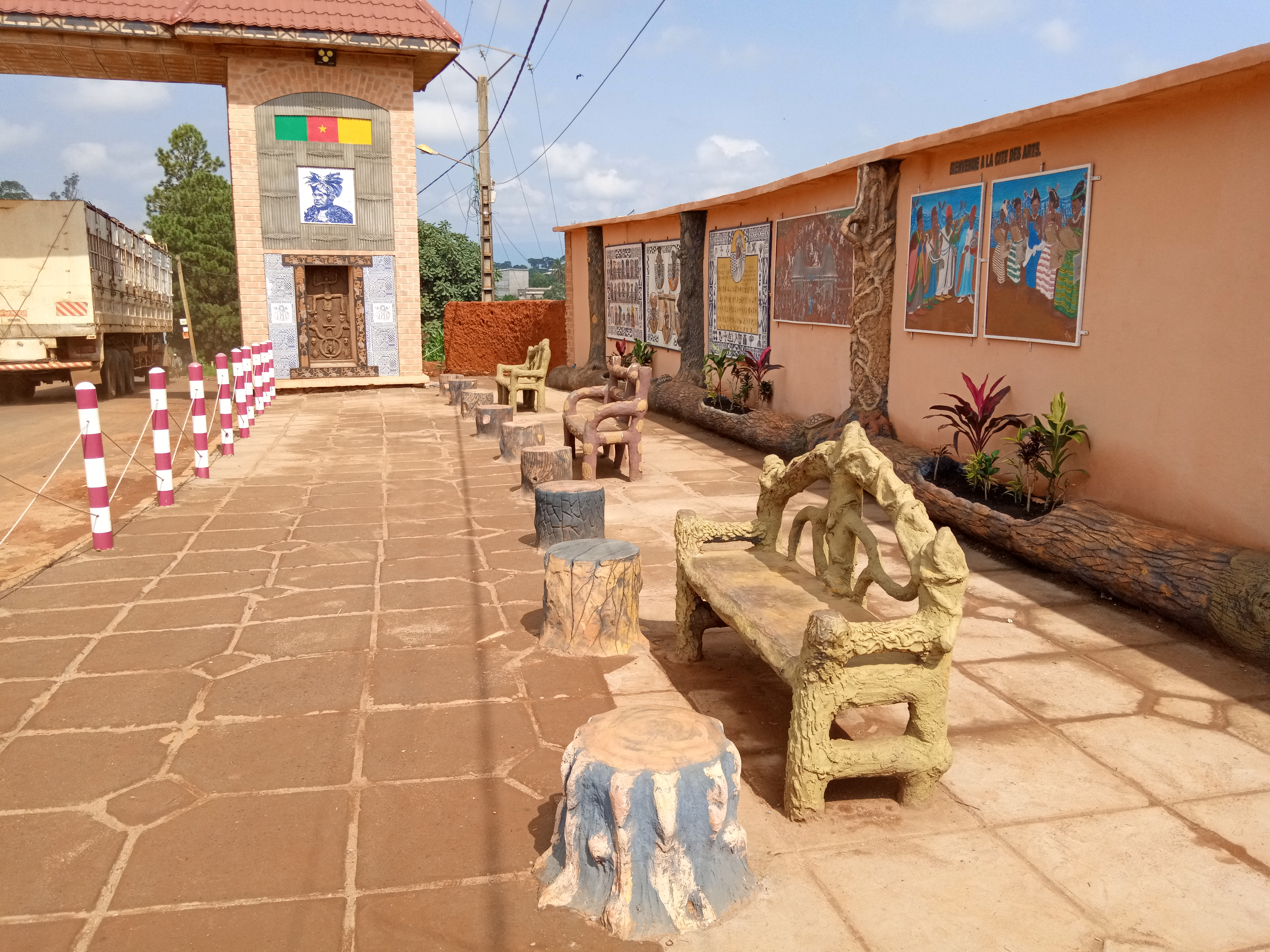
Entree de la ville de Foumban - 03

== Notable people ==
- Arouna N'Joya (1908−1971), politician
- Simon Ngapandouetnbu (2003-), professional footballer who currently plays as a goalkeeper for Marseille

== See also ==
- List of rulers of the Bamum
- History of Cameroon
- Bamum
- Kingdom of Bamum
