= Christopher Nsahlai =

Cameroonian politician and diplomat

Christopher Kiloh Fai Nsahlai (30 December 1943 – 18 April 2008) was a Cameroonian politician and diplomat. A member of the Cameroon People's Democratic Movement (CPDM), he was Cameroon's Ambassador to the Central African Republic from 1985 to 2001, Minister of Transport from 2001 to 2002, and Board Chairman of the Autonomous Port of Douala from 2006 to 2008.

== Political and diplomatic career ==
Nsahlai, a member of the Nso ethnic group, was born in North West Province. After serving as Chargé de mission under Prime Minister Paul Biya from 1975 to 1982, he was First Councillor at the Cameroonian Embassy in West Germany from 1982 to 1984. He was appointed by Biya (who was by this point President) as Assistant Secretary-General of the Presidency of the Republic, with the rank of Minister, in 1984; he was then moved to another diplomatic post in 1985, when he was appointed as Ambassador to the Central African Republic.

Nsahlai wrote a book, Look Up To The Mountain: Beyond Party Politics, while he was Ambassador to the Central African Republic. Although the book stirred controversy among the political establishment for its independent outlook, President Biya took no action against him; some argued that this indicated that dissenting and minority viewpoints were tolerated in the CPDM.

Nsahlai remained Ambassador to the Central African Republic until Biya appointed him to the government as Minister of Transport on 27 April 2001. He remained in the latter post until August 2002, when John Begheni Ndeh was appointed to replace him. Nsahlai helped to create the Bui Common Development Platform, which his supporters credited with improving the CPDM's performance in Bui during the 2002 parliamentary election. He was appointed as the head of a CPDM reforms commission in November 2003. Later, on 24 January 2006, Nsahlai was appointed as Board Chairman of the Douala Port Authority].

Nsahlai worked to persuade the CPDM Central Committee to create a separate Section of the CPDM for Jakiri and campaigned for the party in Jakiri during the July 2007 parliamentary election. After the CPDM won the 2007 election in Jakiri, Social Democratic Front (SDF) Chairman John Fru Ndi alleged on Cameroon Radio and Television's Cameroon Calling that Nsahlai had intimidated voters with gunfire. Nsahlai denied this allegation and said that he did not even know how to use a gun.

Nsahlai, who held various traditional Nso titles, participated in a festival marking Ngonnso, a Nso cultural event, in April 2008, and he hosted a traditional Nso warriors' dance on 12 April. Soon afterwards, suffering from fever and pains, he died at a private clinic in Yaoundé on 18 April 2008, reportedly after injuring his foot. His body was taken from Yaoundé General Hospital on 8 May, and after a wake was held at his home in Yaoundé, the body was moved to Jakiri, where another wake was held. His funeral was held on 10 May. Deputy Prime Minister Jean Nkuete was present at the funeral, representing President Biya, and he posthumously conferred the title of Commander of the Cameroon Order of Valour on Nsahlai.

Nsahlai also served for a time as President of the National Scout Movement.
