= Operation Bui Clean =

- Part of the Anglophone Crisis
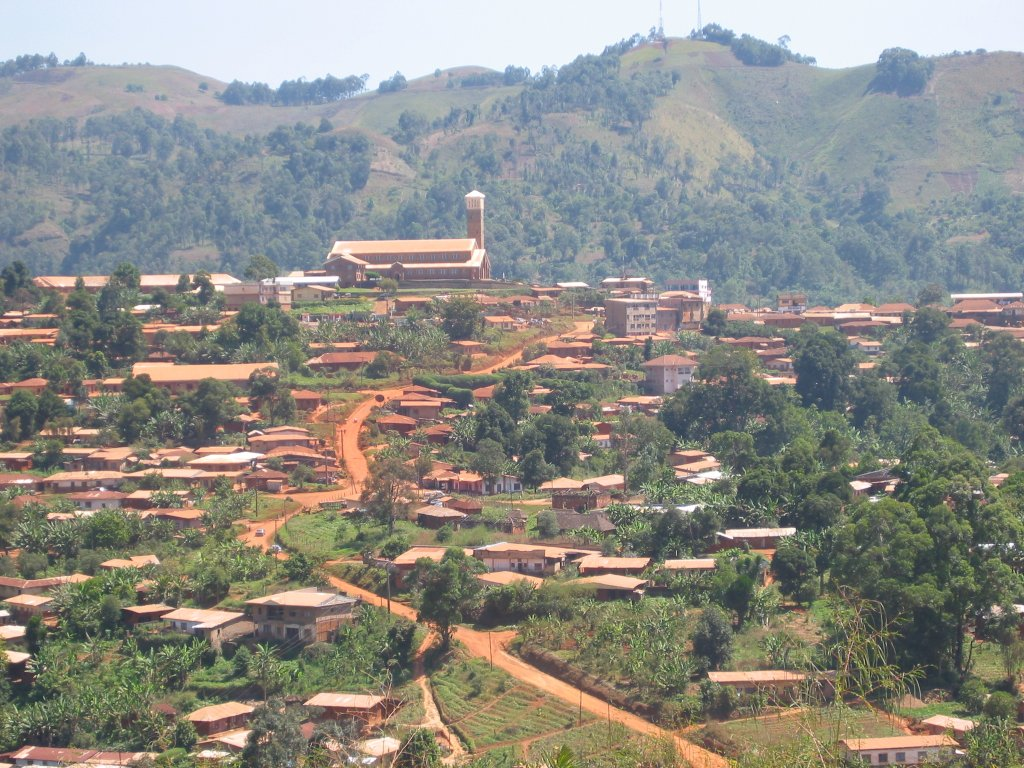
- Kumbo in 2006
Date	May – June 2021
Location	Bui, Northwest Region, Cameroon

Belligerents
Cameroon	Ambazonia

Commanders and leaders
Valere Nka; Matiang Charles Alain	Capo Daniel "General No Pity" (WIA) "General Insobu" "General Thunder" † "General Abakwa" † "General Spider" †

Units involved
5th Joint Military Region: 51st Motorized Infantry Brigade	Ambazonia Defence Forces; Ambazonia Self-Defence Council: Bui Warriors; Bambalang Marine Forces

Strength
400+	Unknown

Casualties and losses
Several killed (Note: On 15 June 2021, commanders Valere Nka and Matiang Charles Alain publicly claimed that only 4 Cameroonian soldiers had been killed in Operation Bui Clean overall. However, Cameroonian military sources previously confirmed that 5 soldiers had been killed in just one of the operation's many clashes. About a dozen soldiers were killed right at the operation's end.)	Several killed

Operation Bui Clean, also called Operation Kumbo Clean or Operation Clean Kumbo, was a military offensive conducted by the Cameroon Armed Forces against Ambazonian separatists in Cameroon's Northwest Region from May to June 2021. The operation took place in the context of the Anglophone Crisis.

== Background ==
After the beginning of the Anglophone Crisis, Ambazonian rebels began to operate in the Northwest Region's department Bui whose center is Kumbo. The separatists enjoyed some advantage in the area as its mountainous terrain and poor infrastructure made it difficult for the security forces to clear them out. The rebel groups in the area included the Ambazonia Defence Forces (ADF), the Ambazonia Intelligence Forces, and the Black Shoes of Oku. Bui's Senior Divisional Officer, Lanyuy Harry, claimed that the rebels disrupted economic activity in the area, and implored the Cameroon Armed Forces to drive them away. However, many locals including members of the elite and clergy were secretly supportive of the insurgents.

In 2020, the Cameroon Armed Forces first attempted to oust the rebels from Bui during "Operation NgokeBui". However, the separatists persisted. In the first half of 2021, rebels inflicted a number of casualties on the Cameroon Armed Forces in the region around Kumbo. In February and March, the Cameroon Armed Forces' 5th Joint Military Region under Brig. Gen. Valere Nka launched another offensive in Bui, termed "Bui 1". Though the military declared this 8-days long operation a success, Nka directly announced his plan for another offensive called "Operation Bui Clean". At this point, rebels still maintained a strong presence in Bui. Meanwhile, one rebel leader, "General No Pity", led his militia, the Bambalang Marine Forces, to increase the rate of attacks on government forces. He consequently became a priority target to the government forces.

== Operation ==
On 15 May 2021, the 5th Joint Military Region under Nka initiated "Operation Bui Clean" (or "Operation Kumbo Clean"). The offensive aimed at destroying separatist forces in the Bui department. The operation was entrusted to 300 soldiers of the 51st Motorized Infantry Brigade, led by Col. Matiang Charles Alain. This time, the military aimed at a thorough security sweep checking Kumbo and all localities around it for rebels. Security forces conducted house-to-house sweeps, tried to clear roads of improvised explosive devices, and sought out rebel bases in the forested mountains.

On 25 May, insurgents attacked an army outpost in Noni, killing five soldiers and seized weapons as well as other equipment.

In course of the offensive, the Cameroonian military overran a number of separatist hideouts including Kikaikom and Muluf. Kikaikom served as the base of "General Insobu" of the Bui Warriors; there, the government forces claimed to have killed "General Thunder". He had served as Insobu's right-hand man, and acted as frontline chief commander of the Ambazonia Self-Defence Council (or "Ambazonia Military Forces"). At Muluf, a site associated with ADF deputy Capo Daniel, the soldiers reportedly killed "General Abakwa". Furthermore, the military claimed to have eliminated "General Spider" and a number of rebel sub-commanders such as "Bui Stars", "Mensah", and "Tanga". The government forces also clashed with the militia of "General No Pity"; the latter was wounded in these clashes, though he survived. The Cameroon Armed Forces advanced up to Verkovi, Mbiame, Ibal, and parts of Nwa in Donga-Mantung. Both sides attacked civilians and burnt houses; locals accused the Cameroonian soldiers of widespread looting and various other abuses. The Fon of Nsem fled his palace in the face of the government offensive, and was subsequently accused by Col. Alain of being a rebel supporter.

On June 13, six civilians were killed by an IED in Kumbo. Daniel claimed that the victims had been inside military vehicles when the attack occurred, and said that they considered military vehicles to be legitimate targets. By mid-June, the military had increased the number of involved soldiers to 400. It subsequently launched the operation's second phase, deploying 300 fresh soldiers to Bui.

The operation was concluded in late June 2021. Right at the offensive's conclusion or shortly after it, rebels ambushed and killed a dozen Cameroonian soldiers in Bui. The Cameroon Armed Forces admitted the death of four soldiers, while declaring that it had successfully reduced the rebel presence and killed at least seven separatists. The military presented some loot to the press, including "ten motorbikes, five AK-47 rifles, dane guns, charms, gallons of contraband fuel, equipment used in manufacturing improvised explosive device". In an interview, Bishop George Nkuo of Kumbo stated that as per his knowledge, many had been killed on both sides in the operation.

== Aftermath ==
Various rebel militias, including the Bui Warriors and Bambalang Marine Forces, continued to operate in Bui despite the government's claim of victory in "Operation Bui Clean". Ultimately, the diverse insurgent groups in Bui began to fight each other, resulting in "General Insobu"'s death at the hands of "General No Pity" in 2022. Bui remained the site of fighting between government forces and rebels in 2023. In April 2024, rebels carried out a substantial attack on Kumbo.
