= Men Own the Fields, Women Own the Crops =

- Author: Miriam Goheen
- Language: English
- Genre: Field Work
- Published: 1996
- Publisher: The University of Wisconsin Press
- Publication date: May 1996
- Publication place: United States
- Media type: Print (hardback and paperback)
- Pages: 252
- ISBN: 029914674X

Men Own the Fields, Women Own the Crops: Gender and Power in the Cameroon Grassfields is a 1996 anthropological book written by Miriam Goheen that collects observations made by Goheen during a sixteen year long stay with the Nso people of Cameroon. During this time, she studied the gender and power dynamics between the elite class and the Nso women.

The book was met with acclaim from members of the academic community and from the Nso’ community as well. Many scholars saw it as a continuation of the work of Phyllis Kaberry, an anthropologist of the early 1900s who conducted similar studies on gender dynamics and female resistance during the 1940s. The book is credited as influencing further writings and discussion in academia on gender dynamics within agriculture, even extending outside of the African continent.

== Background ==
Goheen went to Harvard University earning her PhD in 1984, Goheen published Ideology and Political Symbols In Western African Chiefdom: Commoditization of Land, Labor and Symbolic Capital in Nso, Cameroon, based on the different relationships of commodities such as land, labor, and symbolic capital in Nso, Cameroon. Men Own the Fields, Women Own the Crops is a compilation of observations made by Goheen, an anthropology-sociology professor at Amherst College, during her time studying and living in the Cameroons for a period of sixteen years. Her choice to write and publish the book was inspired by Phyllis Kaberry's report in Nso' chiefdom in highlands of western Cameroon. In addition to Kaberry's report, Goheen traveled to the highlands of western Cameroon to look deeper into Nso's relationship between local and national politics.

== Synopsis ==
In the book, Goheen analyzes the division of power between genders in the Cameroon Grassfields. She lived with the Nso' for over a decade, spending half of her time in Kimbo, the Nso' capital, and the other half in the sub chiefdom of Nsə'. She focused her fieldwork on how the political structure of the chiefdom has changed since the postcolonial state.

The book starts with an introductory to the Nso' chiefdom, covering background information such as its precolonial history and its geographic setting in the west Cameroonian Grassfields. It also describes the social and gender hierarchies that exist within a hegemonic system that has existed for centuries, with the Fon Nso' being at the top of the social and political hierarchies. Only men have a direct influence and presence in politics, even though it has been recognized that women are the backbone of the country. Traditionally, women have been the farmers and ones in charge of domestic duties, but they are not able to sell their own crops or be involved with the market economy. They are also not permitted to land ownership. A longstanding tradition of women farming and men hunting is one of the reasons for this gendered division of labor. However, men no longer need to hunt. While the women can spend 60 hours a week at the farm and doing domestic duties at the compound, men are free to partake in politics. The men did not want the women in charge of trade, because it is said that women reason with their hearts, and so there is a hegemonic system of women being the producers of food and children.

This system has been in place for centuries and was enforced by German colonizers in the early 20th century. While the Germans focused their attention on the Elite and the Fon Nso', they completely ignored the women and their presence in the chiefdom. The Germans were mostly interested in labor, and when the Fon Nso' began supplying it, after he surrendered to them in June 1906, the Germans recognized him as the leader and enforced his rule. During this time, boys were being educated while the girls were not. Men were beginning to grow cash crops, such as coffee, and livestock was introduced to the area. However, the presence of livestock caused women's farmlands to be moved farther from their homes. Women protested, since they feared losing land for their crops and noticed that the livestock was causing damage to the farmland. The women confronted the Fon Nso' about this issue, and he did favor their side of the argument. However, the Fon Nso' did not report this matter to the German officers, solidifying the notion that the women lacked presence in the political structure.

After Goheen describes the pre-colonial and post-colonial state, she writes about her stay with the Nso' and how some of these themes persist and what has changed since then. She also describes how lineage and family ties are more crucial than ever to the Nso', since the practice of privatizing land no longer guarantees women to their lineage land. Women have to work harder than ever, so that they are able to maintain access to land by fulfilling the obligations that she has to her lineage. Some women are now choosing other careers and are waiting longer to get married, since the gender dynamics leave women in charge of most financial burdens in a marriage. There have been mixed reactions to this changing dynamic, with some men vocalizing their opinion in the media, rebuking this behavior and calling it immoral. However, women are also letting their side be heard, with many reiterating the fact that women have always been the backbone of the Cameroonian Grassfields.

== Genre ==
The book Men Own the Fields, Women Own the Crops is an anthropological study based on the in-depth looks of the Nso’ people with their gender-based roles changing the government over time. The book is a scholarly perspective for the Nso’ and their influences that change over time, economically and socially. The authors style of writing was based on observational data, with a perspective that was mainly direct contact of the Nso’ people, and analyzing any kind of change over time. The author didn't have much outside sourcing to influence the style of the book, but when deemed necessary for citing reasons, made sure the writing was not biased.

== Analysis ==
The book has been subject to some academic reviews, with claims that Goheen's work highlights the key role of gender dynamics in politics in pre-colonial and post-colonial times. The book's focus on hegemony and counter-hegemony provides a well-conducted academic approach to analyzing the ways in which the Nso' women navigate power-dynamics, as Goheen sees the Nso women as the promoters of counter-hegemony. Scholars suggest that Goheen's careful analysis of the Nso is a very good expansion of Phillis Kayberry's work, Women in the Grassfields, but also an incredibly friendly read for students and academics alike.

== Publication ==
Men Own the Fields, Women Own the Crops was first published on May 15, 1996, by the University of Wisconsin Press and has been released in both paperback and hardcover. The cover was designed by Gore Studio, and the photograph featured on the front cover was donated by Elizabeth O'Kelly, a rural development officer who oversaw how rural women lived in the British Cameroons. The photograph shows wives of the Fon dancing as drums are played.

== Reception ==
Men Own the Fields, Women Own the Crops caters to a wide audience of people who are looking to educate themselves on the complex, gender dynamics of the west Cameroonian state. The author, Miriam Goheen has received recognition within the Nso' community that she lived with for over a decade and has earned the title "Yaa Nso", which translates to 'Nso' Queen'.
