= Ngondzen Village, Nkum =

Village in Cameroon

Coordinates: 6°20′13″N 10°43′00″E

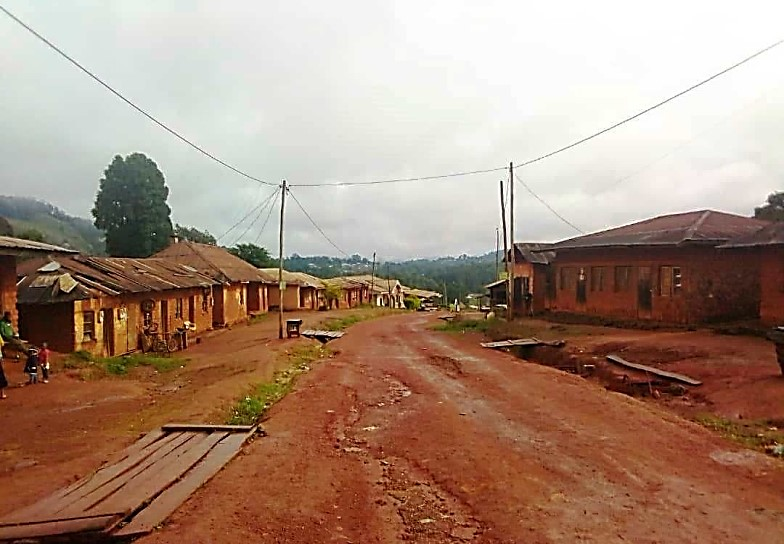
The Ngondzen village square in Nso, Cameroon.

Ngondzen is a village found in Nkum Sub-Division, Bui Division, and North West Region of Cameroon. It lies 15.5 kilometres (9.6 mi) north of Kumbo, the divisional capital of Bui Division. The access road to Ngondzen is the National Road Number 11 – Kumbo-Ndu-Nkambe axis branching at Taakijah village.

== Origins ==
The name Ngondzen was derived from the Wimbum phrase "Ngong Ndip," meaning "the land of water." Historically, the village served as a rest stop for Wimbum traders traveling between Wimbum land and Kumbo market, where they would drink from the numerous streams in the area. These streams were later harnessed in 1972 to give pipe-borne water to the village, as a pioneer project in the region, thanks to external aid and the community development efforts.

== Topography and geography ==
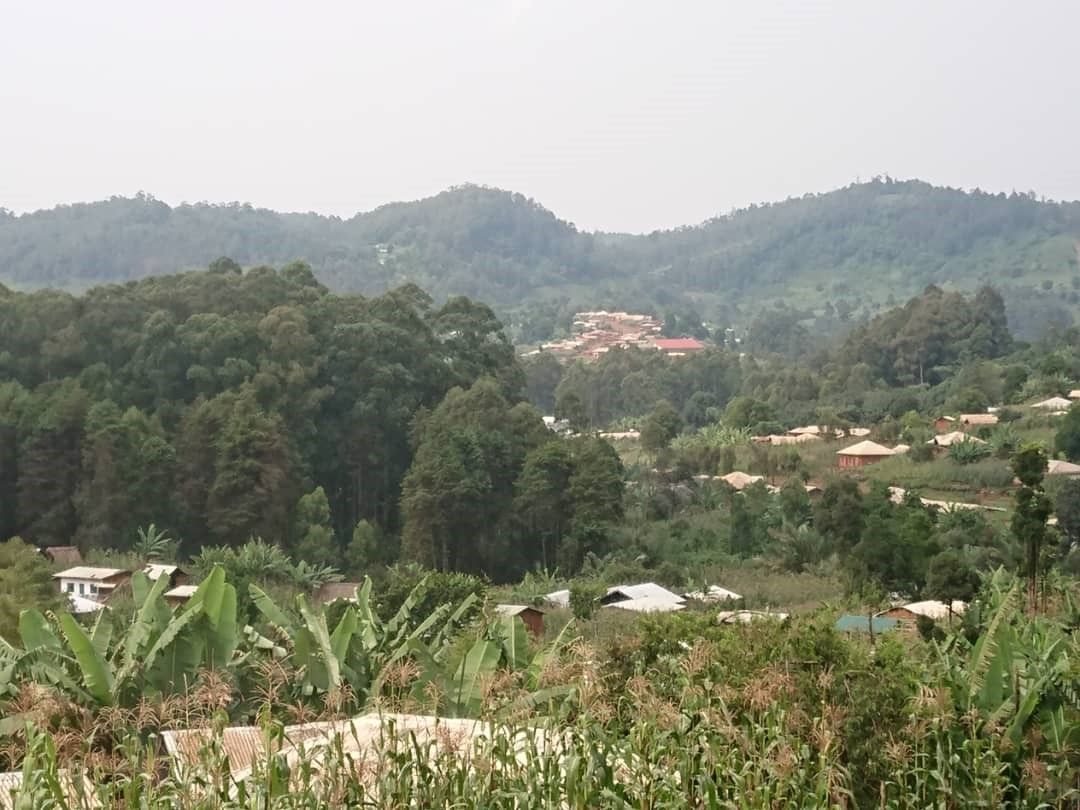
Distant view of Ngondzen village and surroundings.

Ngondzen has three main undulating slopes. The mainland slope lying at the middle of the village is separated from the lateral slopes by river Mah to the east and river Mbim to the west. These rivers converge at a confluence at the base of the village and the name Mbim is maintained. The main road runs through the middle mainland slope which also bears a majority of socio-economic and religious institutions.

== Socio-economic ==
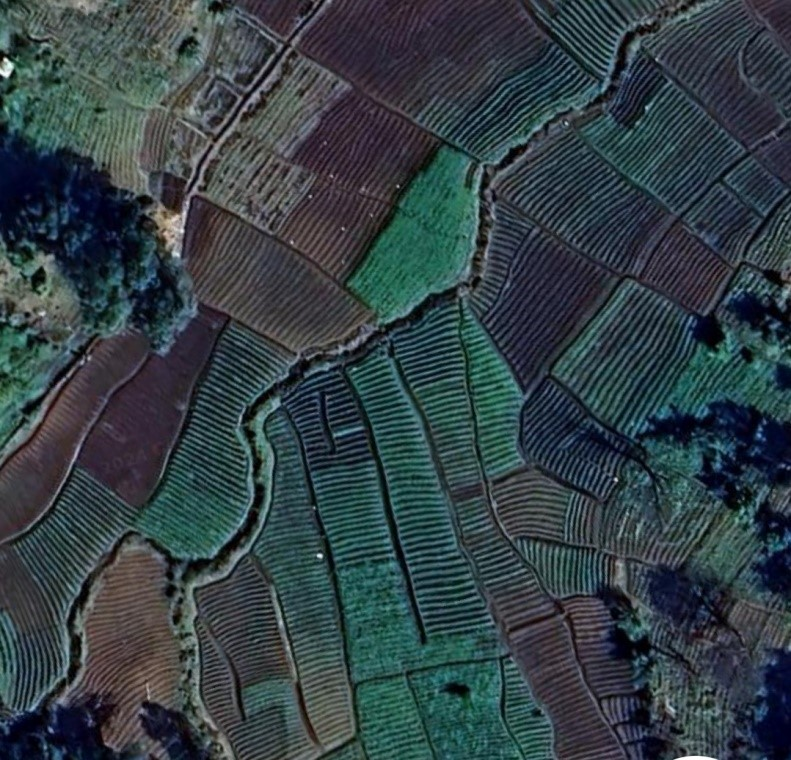
Potato farms along the River Mbim in Cameroon.

Community life in Ngondzen reflects the broader social structure of Nkum communities. During festive, cultural, and recreational occasions, residents commonly consume traditional beverages such as Nkang (corn beer) and palm wine, as well as commercially produced alcoholic drinks. The inhabitants are mostly subsistence farmers, cultivating maize, Irish potatoes, beans, carrots, etc. There is intensive potato farming in the rivers Mbin and Mah marshes during the dry season when these marshes are dry. The excess of these food crops are sold for extra income and transported to cities like Bamenda, Bafoussam, Douala and Yaoundé. In the past, marijuana (locally known as mbanga) was cultivated in the area, benefiting from the village's cool climate. Active crackdown by the government of Cameroon on the cultivation of this plant eventually led to the abandonment of its cultivation. Kola nut trees, particularly red kola, are common around homesteads in the main settlement area. Kola nuts from Ngondzen have long been traded locally and were historically exported by traders to Nigeria (Gwan). The village also produces electricity poles and timber, mainly derived from eucalyptus trees originally planted as a source of domestic fuel.

The inhabitants of Ngondzen run their community development projects through collective labor initiatives. These efforts have supported several local projects, including the establishment of a water supply system, a cooperative credit union, and educational institutions. Under the coordination of the Ngondzen Development and Cultural Association (NDACA), the community constructed a Government Primary School and a Community Secondary School, the latter nearing official approval before the onset of the Anglophone Crisis. The villagers also collectively built a large parish church modeled in cathedral style. Lately, Ngondzen elites have joined in the promotion of development projects in the village, notably through the efforts of Afowiri Fondzenyuy and the Amom Foundation, which traces its origins to the founder's upbringing in Ngondzen and has supported community development initiatives.

== Religious life ==
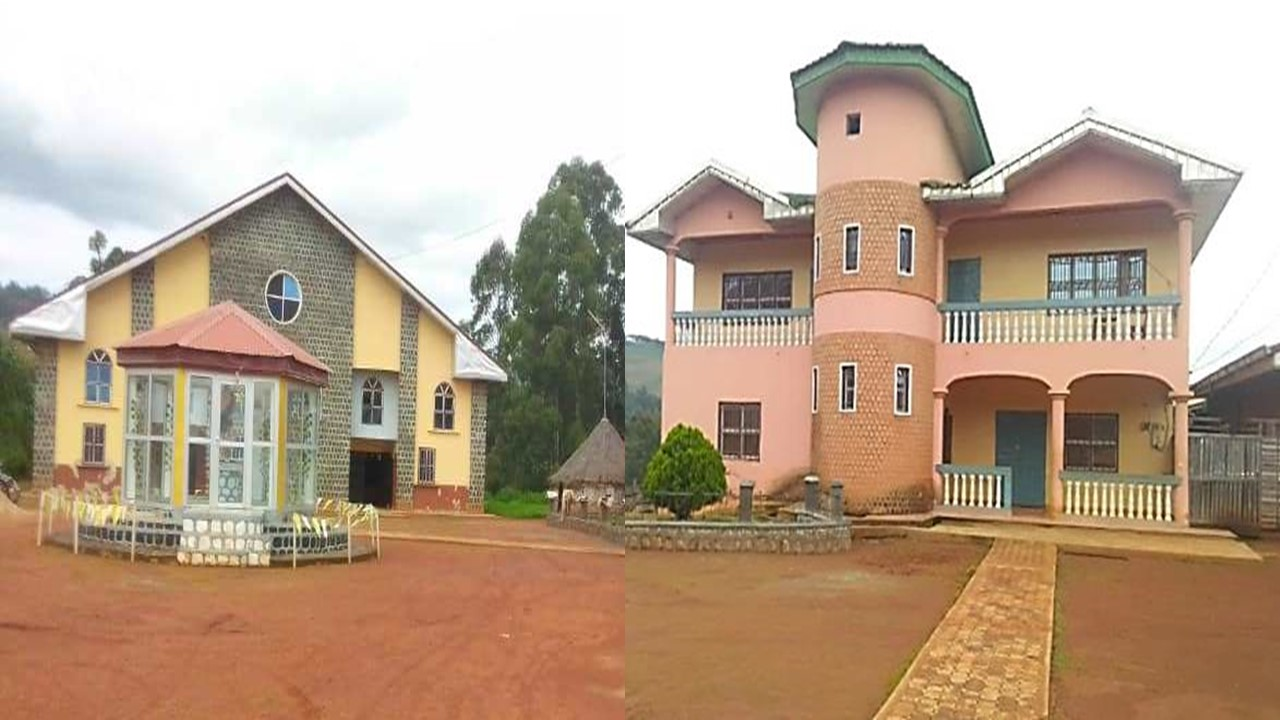
The Ngondzen Catholic Church and presbytery in Nso, Cameroon.

The population of Ngondzen is predominantly Catholic, with only a few families adhering to other faiths such as Islam, the Presbyterian Church, or the Churches of Christ. Agnosticism and non-religious affiliations are rare. The Catholic Church has been the dominant religious institution in the village since its establishment in 1913, and its influence has played a significant role in the community's historical and social development.

== Climate ==
Ngondzen has a cold climate with average annual temperatures of about 20 to 22 °C and an annual rainfall between 1500 and 2000 mm. Ngondzen has no paved roads, and the loose red lateritic soil makes travel challenging; roads become dusty during the dry season and muddy during periods of heavy rainfall. The village experiences consistently low temperatures throughout the year. Cold and dry winds from Ndu, one of the coldest areas in Cameroon, are particularly strong between November and March. The rainy seasons don't warm up either. These conditions lead inhabitants of Ngondzen to keep warm with thick clothing and head coverings.

== Tourism ==
Ngondzen village holds several landmarks and infrastructures including the fluvial landforms, the water catchments, the green potato-covered lowland marshes of the Mbim and Mah rivers among others and the Catholic Mission.
