= Elizabeth O'Kelly =

- Born: 19 May 1915; Didsbury
- Died: 2012 (aged 96–97); St Leonards-on-Sea
- Awards: Member of the Order of the British Empire (1959); Most Exalted Order of the Star of Sarawak (1965)

Elizabeth O'Kelly (19 May 1915 – 2012) MBE was a British Colonial Officer in the British Cameroons, known for her successful promotion of intermediate technology.

Elizabeth O'Kelly was born on 19 May 1915 in Didsbury, the daughter of Alfred Percival O’Kelly and Nina Stevens O’Kelly. She attended Withington Girls' School until poverty and unemployment forced the family to move to Poynton. Determined to enter the Royal Manchester College of Music, she studied on her own to compensate for her unfinished secondary school education and gained admission in 1937. She graduated in 1941 but never taught music, instead joining the Women's Royal Navy Service. She served most of the war in England, but was sent to a naval base in Trincomalee, Sri Lanka in 1945.

After the war, O'Kelly trained as a community development worker. She joined the Cameroons Development Corporation in 1950 and relocated to Buea, where she oversaw literacy classes that taught thousands of native Cameroonians. She became an education officer in the British Colonial Office in 1952, assigned to Nsaw in the remote Northwest Region. She again oversaw literacy classes and forged good relationships with the Fon of the Nso tribe.

Anthropologist Phyllis Kaberry suggested local women would benefit from grinding mills to alleviate the manual toil of corn grinding. O'Kelly arranged for the purchase of hand-powered mills and organized women's cooperatives to operate them called Corn Mill Societies By 1958, sixty-nine Corn Mill Societies were operating successfully. The Societies also improved women's lives in other ways, becoming a vehicle for education including soap making and sewing classes. O'Kelly also arranged to train local blacksmiths to make hand tools that improved productivity and durability. O'Kelly also intervened in difficult social conflicts, between Fulani herdsmen and female farmers and between Kom secret societies and the budding Corn Mill Societies. O'Kelly retired after the 1961 British Cameroons referendum but the Corn Mill Societies continued to thrive.

From 1962 to 1964, O'Kelly organized Women's Institutes in Sarawak on the island of Borneo and introduced paddy hullers to alleviate the work of rice farming. The Institutes continued after she left and had a membership of 12 thousand in 1984. From 1967 to 1969, during the Vietnam War, she worked for the Asian Christian Service in Vietnam, working with relief groups. She served as general secretary of the Associated Country Women of the World from 1969 to 1971. She worked as a consultant for various NGOs, including with UNICEF on a series of pamphlets about labor saving devices for women in Bangladesh.

Elizabeth O'Kelly died in 2012 in St Leonards-on-Sea.

== Awards and honors ==
Elizabeth O'Kelly was awarded the Member of the Order of the British Empire in 1959 and the Most Exalted Order of the Star of Sarawak in 1964. The Fon of the Nso tribe awarded her the title of ya (queen mother).

== Bibliography ==
- Aid and Self-Help. Charles Knight, London, 1973.
- Simple Technologies for Rural Women in Bangladesh. UNICEF Bangladesh Women's Programme, June 1978.
- Rural Women: Their Integration in Development Programs and How Simple Intermediate Technologies Can Help Them. London: IT Publications, 1987.
