= Bui (Cameroon department) =

Coordinates: 6°12′N 10°40′E

- Department
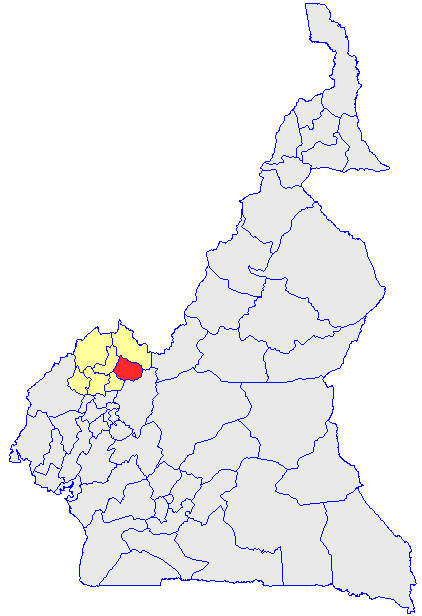
- Department location in Cameroon
- Country: Cameroon
- Province: Northwest Province
- Capital: Kumbo

Area
  - Total: 887 sq mi (2,297 km^{2})

Population (2001)
  - Total: 322,877
- Time zone: UTC+1 (WAT)

Bui (Builand) is a department of Northwest Province in Cameroon. The department covers an area of 2,297 km^{2} and as of 2001 had a total population of 322,877. The capital of the department lies at Kumbo.

== Subdivisions ==
The department is divided administratively into 6 Districts and in turn into villages. Greater Kumbo is further divided into 2 subdistricts, Kumbo Urban and Kumbo Rural

=== Districts ===
- Elak-Oku
- Jakiri
- Kumbo
- Mbiame
- Nkum
- Noni

== See also ==
- Communes of Cameroon
