= Wainamah =

Village in Cameroon

Wainamah is one of 33 villages in the town of Jakiri, Cameroon. It is the second village into Jakiri from Bamenda. It is located along the Ring Road in the North West Region of Cameroon, on a hill. It is bounded by Babessi town in Ngoketuja Division and villages like Sarkong, Ntseimban, Waarin, Limbo, and Kwansoh.

== History ==
The name Wainamah comes from the Nso language (lamnso). Wai Namah is literally translated as "tobacco market". The name stems from the first settlers of the area who were cultivating and selling tobacco. They then became numerous that the area grew into a village. The soil is very fertile with rich Volcanic characteristics. The Settlers are mostly farmers

== Geography and climate ==
Wainamah is located some 78 km from Bamenda and 1802 m above sea level and about 2500m in areas like Ntseimban. This village experiences alternative wet season of about eight(8) months from mid March and dry season of about four (4) months from mid November. The village is characterized by very low temperatures with a continuous gentle breeze as it is located on a hill top. Highest temperatures recorded here ranges between 18 C – 21.80 C around March. Temperatures can go as low as 10.4 C between August and September.

== Education ==
There is a government High school (G H S) at Wainamah and one Government Primary school.

== Economy ==
Agriculture is the backbone of the economy of Wainamah village. Though the name 'Wainamah' means 'tobacco market', it is a bit difficult to find tobacco in the area. This is because of the decline in the price of the tobacco years back, new farms and modern methods of cultivation by the companies that used to buy the local tobacco from these villagers, thus, the new generation here does not find it worthy to cultivate the tobacco since it is mainly for export, consumed by a very few aged people. The abandonment of tobacco cultivation led to peasant agriculture with main crops like maize, beans, cassava, palm wine tapping and cattle rearing. Wainamah has the second largest cattle market in Bui Division with a slaughter slap provided by the state. The villagers of Wainamah take advantage of the long rainy season which ensures continuous availability of grass and legumes for animals to rear a good number of cattle, goats and sheep.

The cold temperatures slow down agricultural activities as crops such as maize which is one of the main crops cultivated here take up to 7–8 months to mature. This forces the villagers to take up farms in the neighboring villages like Kwanso or Babessi town.

There also exist a few shops in the village. Here, bars or drinking spots of either mix of industrially brewed drinks and palm wine or exclusive palm wine spots which outnumber the industrially brewed drinks spots.

== Administration and politics ==
Wainamah, a village in Jakiri is under the control of a Divisional officer for Jakiri Sub Division administratively and The Mayor of Jakiri. The inhabitants of Wainamah actively participate in politics. Though there are numerous political parties in Cameroon, only two – the Social Democratic Front (S.D.F) of Ni John Fru Ndi and the Cameroon People's Democratic Movement (C.P.D.M) as of 2016 It is place under direct supervision of a councilor (Jakiri counsel Agent).

== Health ==
Wainamah has a Health Center that is headed by a chief of center and managed by a doctor based in Jakiri (Mantung Hospital) the hospital serves about 5,276 inhabitants of the village including villagers from other neighboring villages. There are about 12 beds in the Health center and 3 nurses (2016).

== Religion ==
The inhabitants of Wainamah mostly practice Christianity and Islam. This is indicated by the presence of churches like The Cameroon Baptist Convention (CBC), the Apostolic Church, Catholic Church, Presbyterian Church, and a Mosque.
