= Operation Bamenda Clean =

Part of the Anglophone Crisis in Cameroon

- Part of the Anglophone Crisis
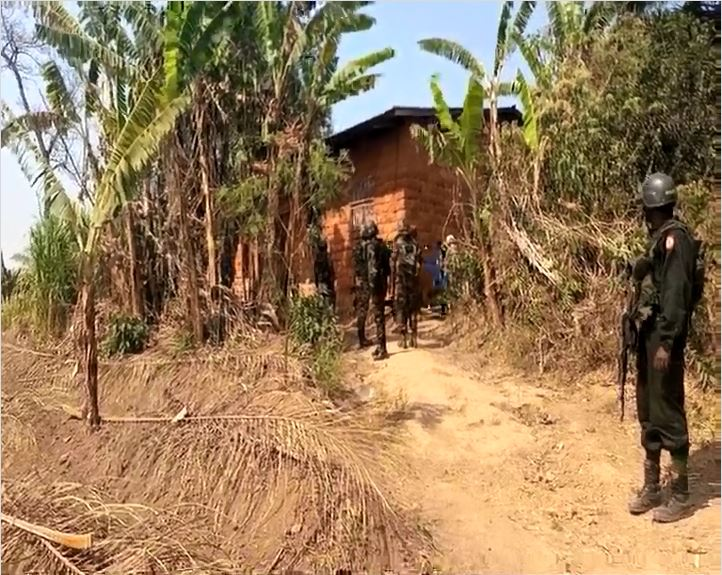
- Cameroonian soldiers in front of a captured rebel hideout at Bamenda in 2021
Date	8 September 2020– c. 2021 or 2022
Location	Bamenda, Northwest Region, Cameroon
Result	Concluded without an official announcement (Note: When Valere Nka was transferred out of the 5th Joint Military Region in 2022, Operation Bamenda Clean was listed as one of the operations he had led. It was not listed as an ongoing operation that was inherited by his successor. Nevertheless, the operation was never given an official end date.)

Belligerents
Cameroon	Ambazonia

Commanders and leaders
Brig. Gen. Valere Nka; Brig. Gen. Ekongwesse Divine Nnoko; Gousmo Emile; Paul Achobang (Mayor of Bamenda)	"General Sweet Tuma" (POW) "General Lion" † "General Cobra" (POW) "General Cross and Die" † "General Trouble" † "General Satan" † "General Weapon" †

Units involved
Rapid Intervention Battalion; 5th Joint Gendarmerie Region; Police units	Ambazonia Defence Forces; Bambalang Marine Forces; Other unspecified armed groups

Casualties and losses
	Over 20 surrendered (according to Cameroon)

Operation Bamenda Clean is an ongoing Cameroonian special counter-insurgency operation in Bamenda, Northwest Region, aimed at preventing armed Ambazonian separatists from operating in the city. By January 2021, Cameroon was gradually achieving what a security analyst at the University of Yaoundé called "relative peace" in Bamenda, and the mayor of the city stated that the operation was succeeding. However, as of March 2021, separatist-imposed ghost towns remained widely respected by the local population, and separatists controlled most roads leading in and out of Bamenda.

== Background ==
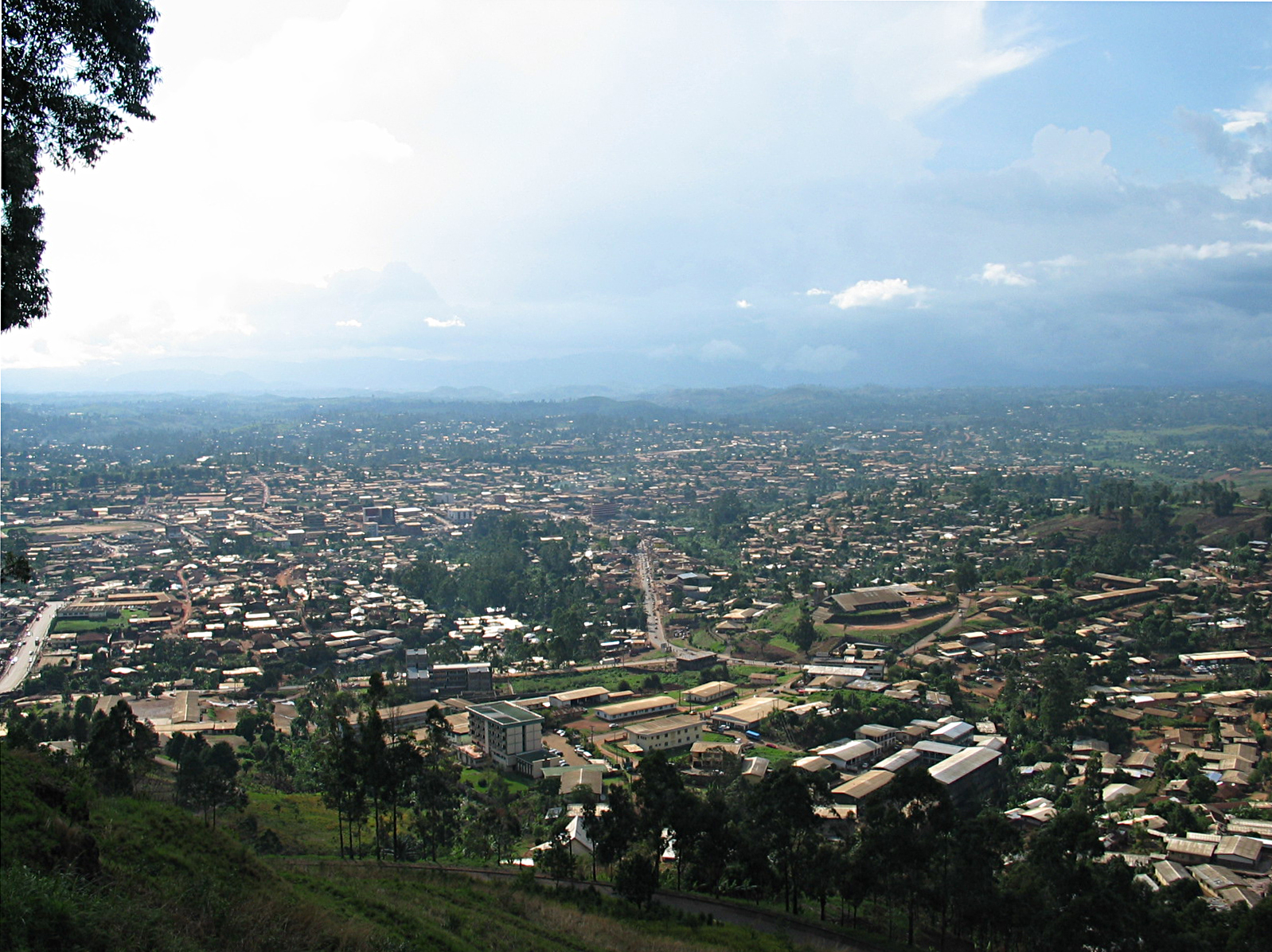
View of Bamenda

Throughout the Anglophone Crisis, armed separatists had used motorcycles to carry out hit-and-run attacks against soldiers and police officers, and the Cameroonian security forces wished to deprive them of bases of operation in the city and its vicinity. On 4 September, the Mayor of Bamenda outlawed motorcycles in the city, to which separatists responded by threatening to bring all traffic to a halt. Three days prior to the official launch of the operations, soldiers from the Rapid Intervention Battalion had killed a prominent Ambazonian general in Bamenda named Luca Fonteh, known as the nom de guerre "General Mad Dog".

The rebels in Bamenda include female fighters.

== The operation ==
=== Aims and rationale ===
The operation was officially announced on the same day as it commenced on 8 September 2020 a day before the three-year anniversary of the start of the war and 23 days before the Ambazonian Independence Day.

The aims were stated to be to protect civilians from "terrorists" and "criminals" and restore public security in the city. The operation was consistent with Cameroon's general military strategy of focusing on retaining control over all major urban areas in the Anglophone regions, while not trying to recapture all rural areas that had come under separatist control. As of September 2020, separatists openly controlled villages not far from Bamenda.

=== Timeline of notable events ===
==== 2020 ====
- On 10 September, a Cameroonian soldier was killed during clashes with separatists. Ambazonia Defence Forces deputy defense chief Capo Daniel (based in exile) responded by imploring local civilians to rise up in opposition to Operation Bamenda Clean.
- On 14 September, two people were summarily executed by soldiers.
- On 21 September, soldiers summarily executed five civilians in Ngongham, outside Bamenda.
- On 6 October, several teachers were abducted by alleged separatists.
- On 16 October, a fire erupted in the building where the command post of the Bamenda Territorial Gendarmerie was located. According to an official statement, the cause had been an accident rather than an act by the separatists, and the fire was put out after two and a half hours.
- On 3 November, Cameroon accused separatists of attacking the Longla Comprehensive College in Bamenda.
- At some point in late-December, there were armed clashes and explosions, and an eight-year-old was killed when he got caught in the crossfire between Cameroonian troops and separatist fighters.

==== 2021 ====
- On 23 January, at least four civilians were killed in Bamenda.
- On 1 February, Cameroonian soldiers "neutralized" two armed separatists in Bamenda, and captured a separatist commander known as "General Sweet Tuma".
- On 3 February, three public employees were abducted by suspected separatists in Bamenda, allegedly for sealing shops whose owners respected separatist-imposed ghost towns.

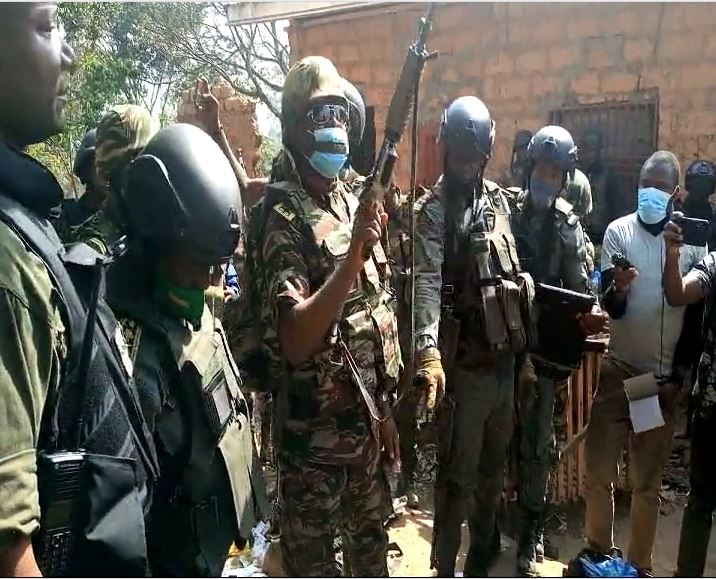
Cameroonian soldiers give interviews after the hostage rescue at Ntanka in February 2021

- On 5 February, Cameroonian soldiers rescued four civilian hostages from a separatist camp at Ntanka, outside Bamenda. The Cameroonian Army reported to have suffered no casualties, and claimed that four separatist fighters were killed and four captured in the fighting. One of the dead insurgents was "General Lion". One civilian was wounded during the raid.
- On 8 February, two Cameroonian soldiers were killed in a separatist ambush.
- On 5 March, heavy fighting was reported in Bamenda.
- On 10 March, at least two Cameroonian soldiers were killed when separatists ambushed a military control post in Bamenda. Clashes were also recorded elsewhere in the city.
- On 4 April, a police officer was killed on the Bamenda-Bali road in a suspected separatist ambush.
- On 7 April, the head of the Disarmament, Demobilization, and Reintegration Centre in Bamenda was abducted from his home.
- On 18 April, following clashes with separatists Mile 90, Bamenda, Cameroonian soldiers entered a local bar and massacred at least five civilians.
- On 19 April, separatist commander "General Cobra" and four of his fighters were captured in Bamenda.
- On 30 April, there were clashes in the neighborhood of Rendezvous.
- On 8–9 May, soldiers freed at least four hostages in a raid on a separatist camp in Tanka, Bamenda. Neither side suffered casualties.
- On 26 May, separatist fighters shot a civilian multiple times, reportedly after he had publicly criticized their activities. He died from his wounds days later.
- On 4 July, Cameroonian soldiers killed a civilian at a police control post in Below Foncha, Bamenda. The killing sparked mass protests, during which civilians destroyed the control post.
- On 6 July, two separatist fighters were killed in Bamenda.
- On 19 July, separatist fighters were recorded dismembering a Cameroonian soldier in Bamenda.
- On 1 August, Cameroonian troops rescued a soldier from an Ambazonian detention facility, hours before his scheduled execution.
- On 7 August, three civilians were killed by suspected separatists in Mile 2 Nkwen, Bamenda.
- On 12 August, separatists abducted a man they accused of selling products that they had banned. The man was later killed in captivity.
- On 11 September, a police officer was killed in Bamenda.
- On 12 September, at least four separatist fighters were killed in Bamenda.
- On 1 October, the Cameroonian Army claimed to have killed a high-ranking soldier of the Bambalang Marine Forces.
- On 29 October, ADF commander "General Cross and Die" was killed in Bamenda.
- On 15 November, two separatists were killed during a shootout with police forces.
- On 19 November, separatists blew up a military vehicle in Bamenda with an IED, causing an unknown number of casualties. The ADF claimed responsibility.
- On 9 December, separatists ambushed a BIR convoy, and the ensuing gunfight saw the deaths of four separatist fighters.
- On 22 December, Cameroonian soldiers killed two civilian teenagers and injured one in Ngongham, Bamenda.

== Alleged abuses ==
In late-September, the Cameroon Bar Association accused the army of extorsion and intimidation of civilians, arbitrary arrests, assault, torture, and denying detained persons access to lawyers. Similar concerns were voiced by locals on the same day as the operation started. Brig. Gen. Valere Nka denied the accusations and said that the army respected human rights.
