= Mus'art Gallery =

- Established: December 1996
- Location: Kumbo, Cameroon
- Type: ethnographic Museum
- Director: Peter Musa
- Website: http://www.musartgallery.org

The Musa Heritage Gallery, is an art museum in Kumbo, Cameroon. It houses a collection of over 400 art objects that were mainly created between 1970 and 2000 and range from bamboo work to wood carvings, from basketry to pottery. The museum is a place for exchanges and education, a place where arts open paths for better understanding of history and traditions from the Grass-fields region of Cameroon.

== History ==
Musa Heritage Gallery in short Mus’Art Gallery, also known as the Grassfields Museum, was established in December 1996 in honour of the Cameroonian artists Daniel Kanjo Musa (1930–1995) and his eldest son John Yuniwo Musa (1956–1996).

The Mus'Art Gallery has been active in propagating the Nso' cultural heritage. The museum has been at the forefront of promoting Nso’ traditional artistry and craftsmanship. Mus’Art Gallery has a collection of over 400 objects most of which were created between 1970 and 2000. These varied and diverse objects range from bamboo work to wood carvings, basketry to pottery.

The museum continues to acquire contemporary Cameroonian arts and crafts while maintaining a major focus on the Western Grass-fields region. This region is internationally renowned for having produced masterpieces of African art.

These objects were appropriated by colonial missionaries and officers and removed from their place of origin to museums in Europe or the United States. Masterpieces of Grass-fields art are today in foreign museums. The statue of Ngonnso’ founder the Nso’ kingdom is kept in a museum in Germany. In Nso’ there is an outcry for this statue to be returned to its people.

Mus’Art Gallery’s mission:

- propagate Nso’ cultural Mus’Art Gallery’s mission: heritage;
- preserve in response to the loss of the precious art objects so the art of the past is not lost to the region;
- support the arts and crafts of the Western Grass-fields of Cameroon;
- highlight the excellence and diversity of regional artists, past and present, so these may become known nationally and internationally;
- make the arts and crafts of this region of Cameroon known publicly in Cameroon and internationally.

== Exhibits ==
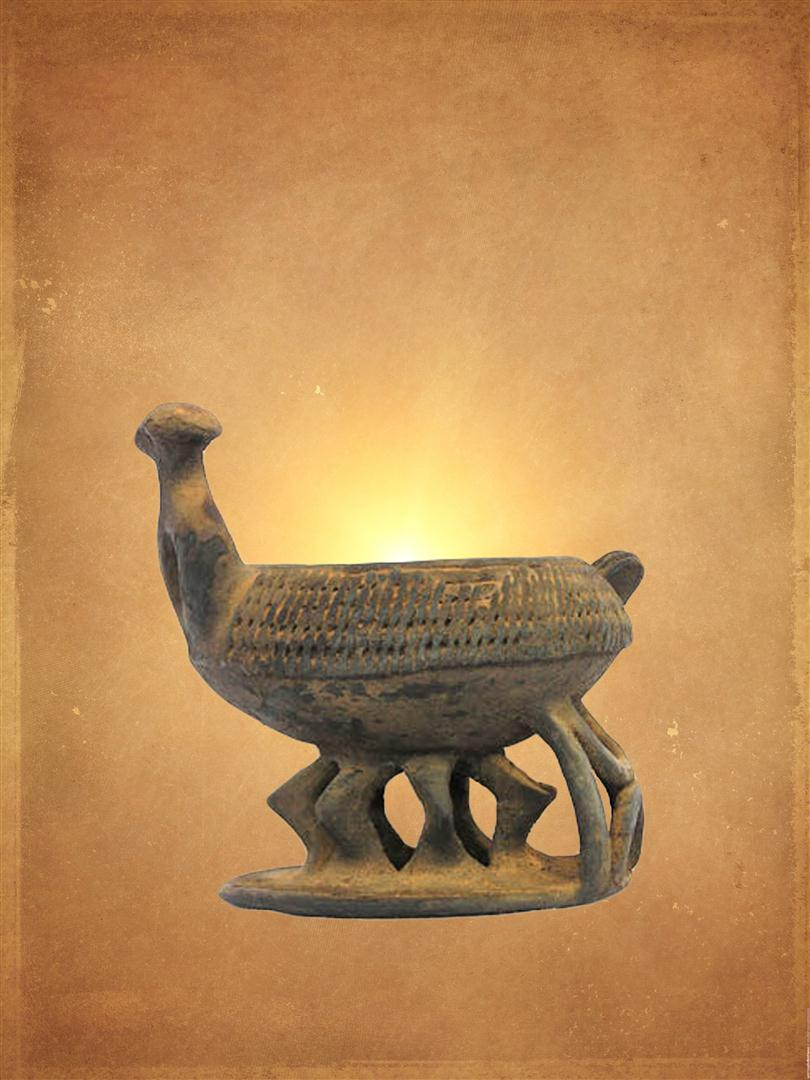
Mus'art Gallery

Among the 400 objects and works of art exhibited, visitors can admire carved masks, wood statues and other objects made by the Musas between 1970 and 2000. There are other objects collected from the grass-fields, such as traditional musical instruments, hunting gadgets, metal works, bamboo objects and pottery. Temporary exhibitions are also sometimes proposed.

== The museum today ==
- Place for exchanges and education
- Place where arts open paths for better understanding of history and traditions from the Grass-fields region of Cameroon
- Aims to evolve in order to become:

- The cultural centre of Kumbo
- a leader in cultural democratization and heritage preservation of arts, music and crafts in Cameroon
- Continues to acquire contemporary Cameroonian arts and crafts while maintaining a major focus on the Western Grass-fields region, internationally renowned for having produced masterpieces of African art

- Focuses on the preservation, education and promotion of the cultural legacy of the Grass-fields of Cameroon
- Is convinced that arts can enable a lot of people, particularly youths, to earn a livelihood engaging in the art sector
- Helps to create income (art sector and museums offer numerous career opportunities)
- Fights poverty and unemployment
- Promotes the creative sector.
- Temporary exhibitions in order to promote contemporary artists who demonstrate how our art and craft has been evolving

Mus'Art Gallery is a place for exchanges and education, a place where arts open paths for better understanding of history and traditions from the Grass-fields region of Cameroon.

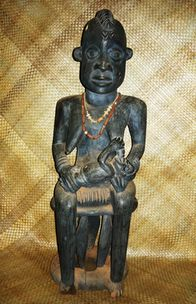
Mother and child (Musa Heritage Gallery, Kumbo, Cameroon)

Mus'Art Gallery aims to evolve in order to become the cultural centre of Kumbo, as well as a leader in cultural democratization and heritage preservation of arts, music and crafts in Cameroon.

Over the years, Mus'Art Gallery has been expanding to diversify its collection, but has focused on the preservation, education and promotion of the cultural legacy of the Grass-fields of Cameroon. The museum is also known as the Grass-fields arts museum.

Mus'Art Gallery is convinced the arts can enable a lot of people, particularly youths, earn a livelihood engaging in the arts. This should help to create income for them and their families, fight poverty and unemployment, and contribute to the creative sector.

The museum continues to acquire contemporary Cameroonian arts and crafts and focuses on Western Grass-fields region. The gallery is also interested in showing what artists could do today.

This should be realized through temporary exhibitions" Musa mentioned. He equally highlighted the place of the arts in promoting the culture of the people of the grass-fields of Cameroon. He told the students that the art world and museums apart from serving as platforms for learning and entertainment, offers numerous career opportunities and should be considered as the students moved into tertiary education in future.

The museum continues to acquire contemporary Cameroonian arts and crafts while maintaining a major focus on the Western Grass-fields region. This region is internationally renowned for having produced masterpieces of African art.

== Heritage Collection ==
=== Grass-Fields Utensils ===
The collection includes utensils made by the Grassfield people,(peoples of North-West and West Cameroon). These utensils include pots, plates, dishes, spoons and knives. They are made using materials such as glass, plastic, enamel, wood, glazed pottery. Most of the utensils used in Cameroon now are imported with Chinaware being popular, as are enamel and plastic utensils.

Traditional artists and craftsmen of the Grass-fields produced a lot of utensils which were used by the people. The utensils included bowls, baskets, trays, knives, spoons, pots etc. These utensils were made using locally available materials such as wood, clay and straw. The utensils were made from environmentally friendly materials. The technology was basic but entailed great skills in order to produce some of the utensils.

Slavery, colonization, trading and the introduction of western education were all factors that contributed to the gradual under-utilisation and elimination of the traditional utensils. Historically the pursuit for western education in colonial schools, plantation workers who went to the coast to work in rubber or banana estates, kola nut traders who went to Northern Nigeria from the Grass-fields came back home with modern utensils. Those who were not fortunate to travel and stayed in the hinterlands and villages used traditional utensils, and were considered poor or primitive by those who acquired the Whiteman’s utensils.

The utensils of the Grass-fields were used by the entire fabric of society from the Kings (Fons) to the commoners. However there were distinctions to what was meant for the Fons and the common man or peasants. It was customary in the Grass-fields for the Fons to have the best in terms of quality, beauty, aesthetics, and symbolism. Twins for instance in the Nso’ and Wimbum tribes had special containers in which palm oil meant for their food was preserved. In Nso’ with a history of polygamous homes, the family head (father) of the household kept the container in which palm oil was stored. With a specially fashioned wooden spoon he dished out palm oil which he sent through his little children who came into his living quarter with small clay pots from their mothers when it was cooking time.

=== Replicas ===
The museum continues to acquire contemporary Cameroonian arts and crafts while maintaining a major focus on the Western Grass-fields region. This region is internationally renowned for having produced masterpieces of African art. Unfortunately these objects were appropriated by colonial missionaries and officers and removed from their place of origin to museums in Europe or the United States of America. Masterpieces of Grass-fields art are today in foreign museums and it is most likely they will never be returned. The statue of Ngonnso’ founder the Nso’ kingdom is kept in a museum in Germany. In Nso’ there is an outcry for this statue to be returned to its people.

== Gallery ==
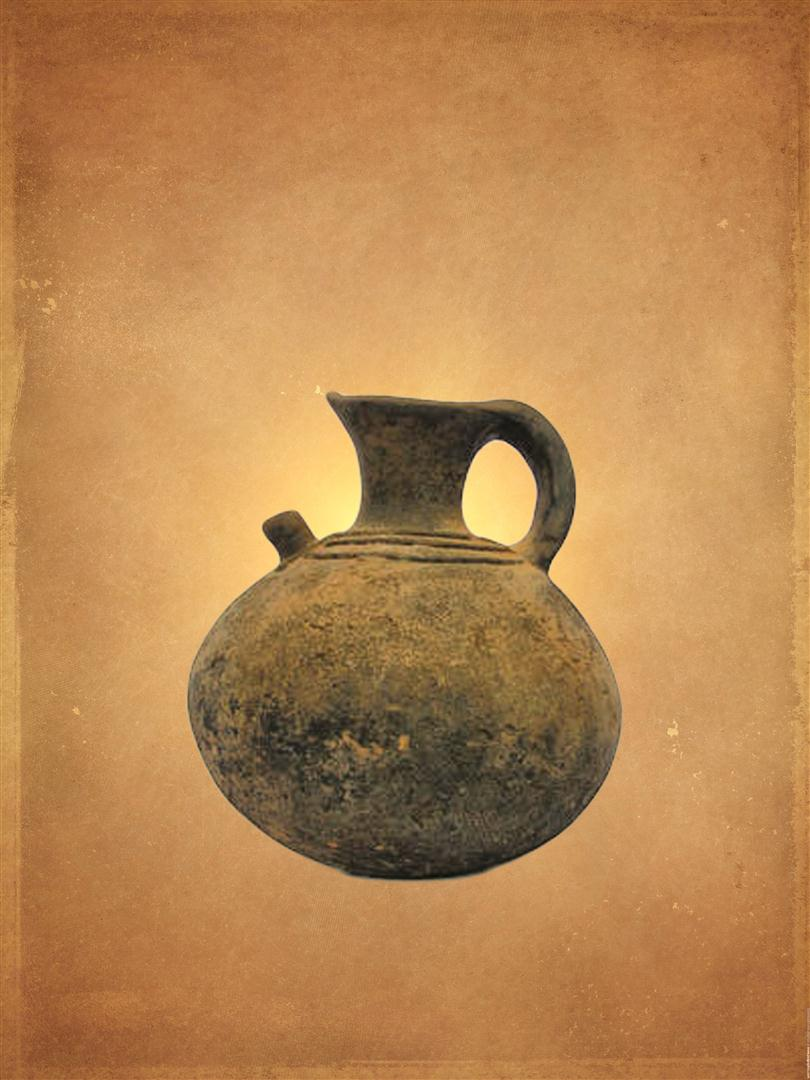
Utensils

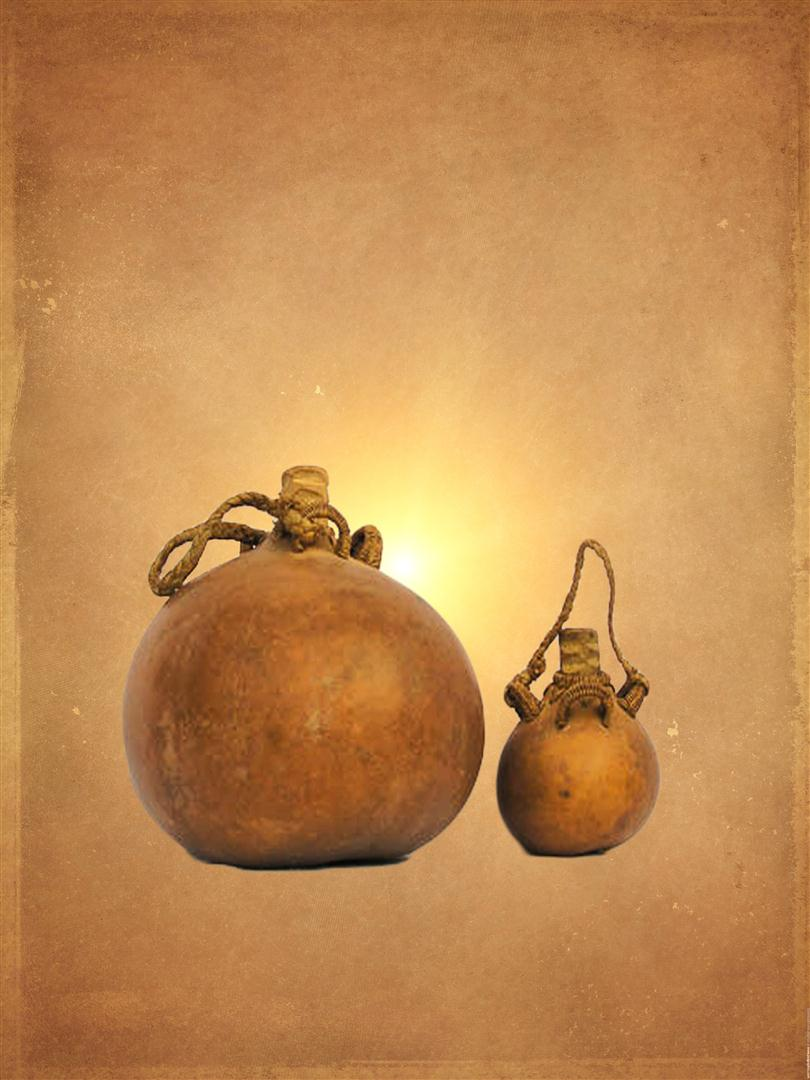
Utensils

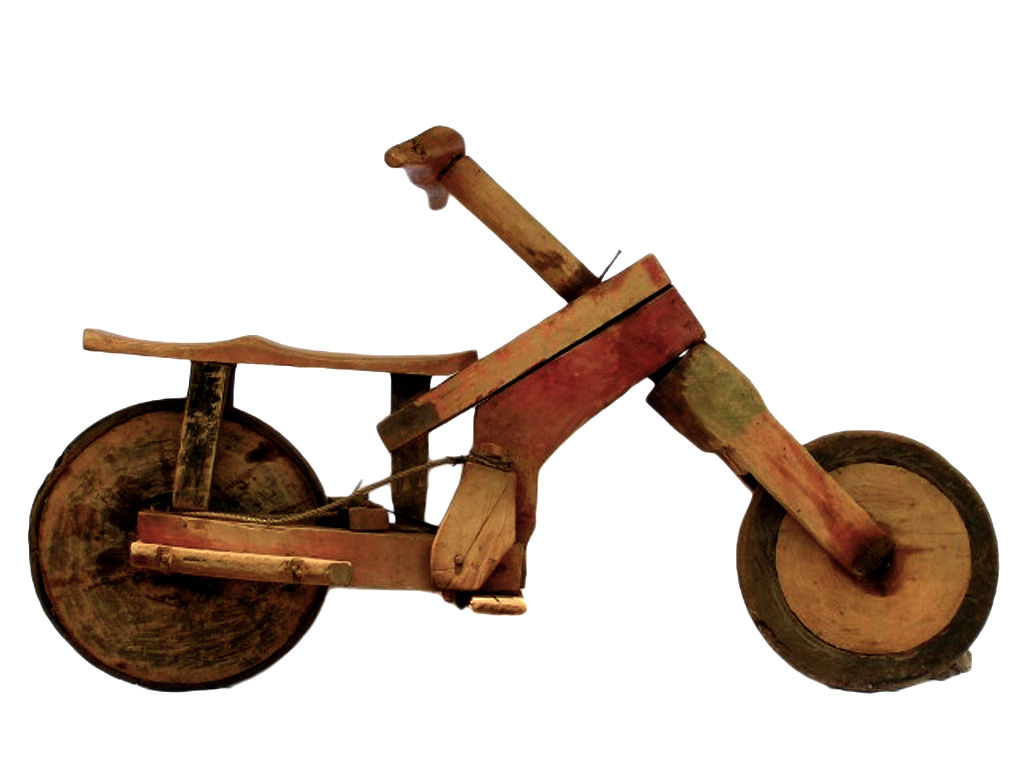
A Boys Scooter 'Kikotoh'

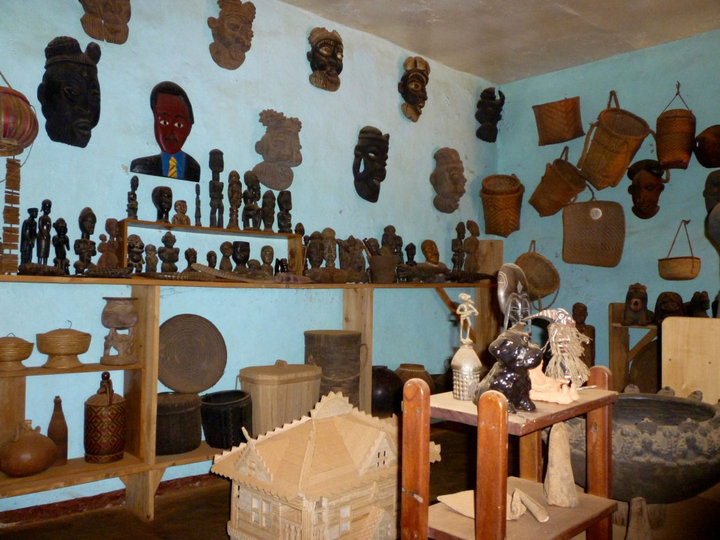
Mus'Art Gallery

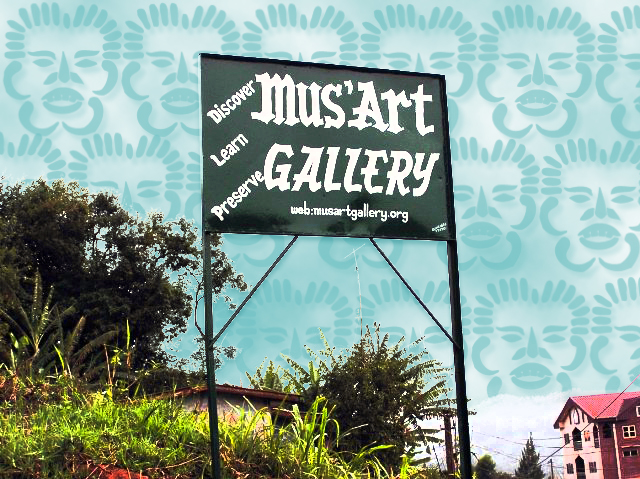
Sign post

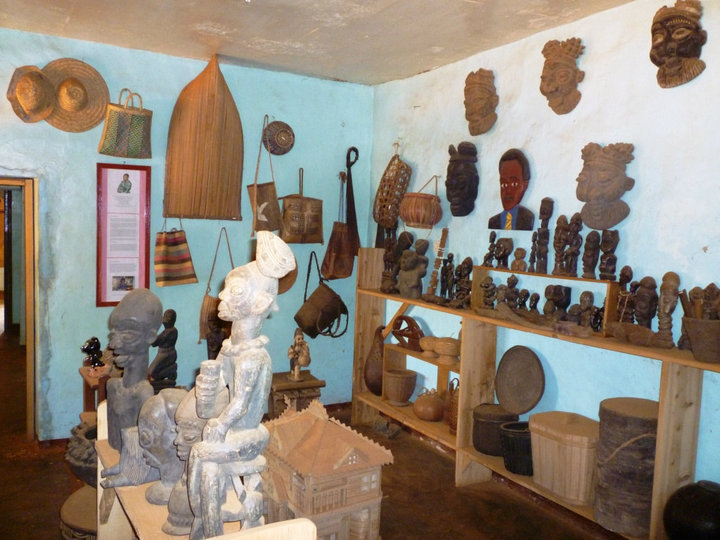
Mus'Art Gallery

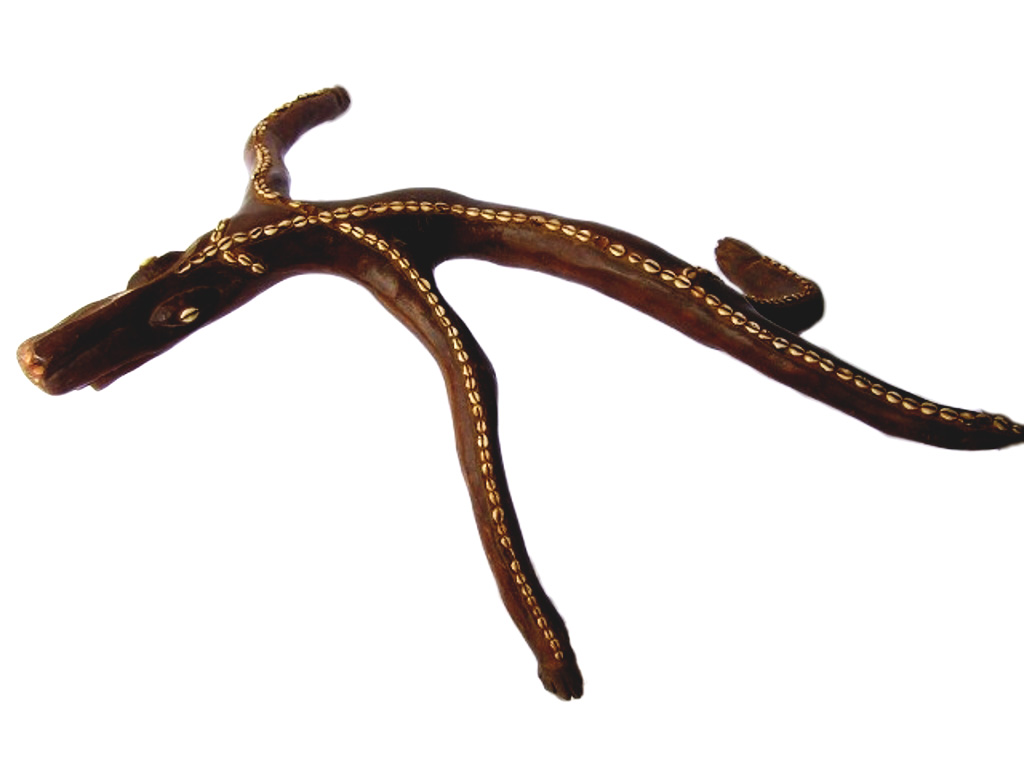
Flying monster by John Yuniwo

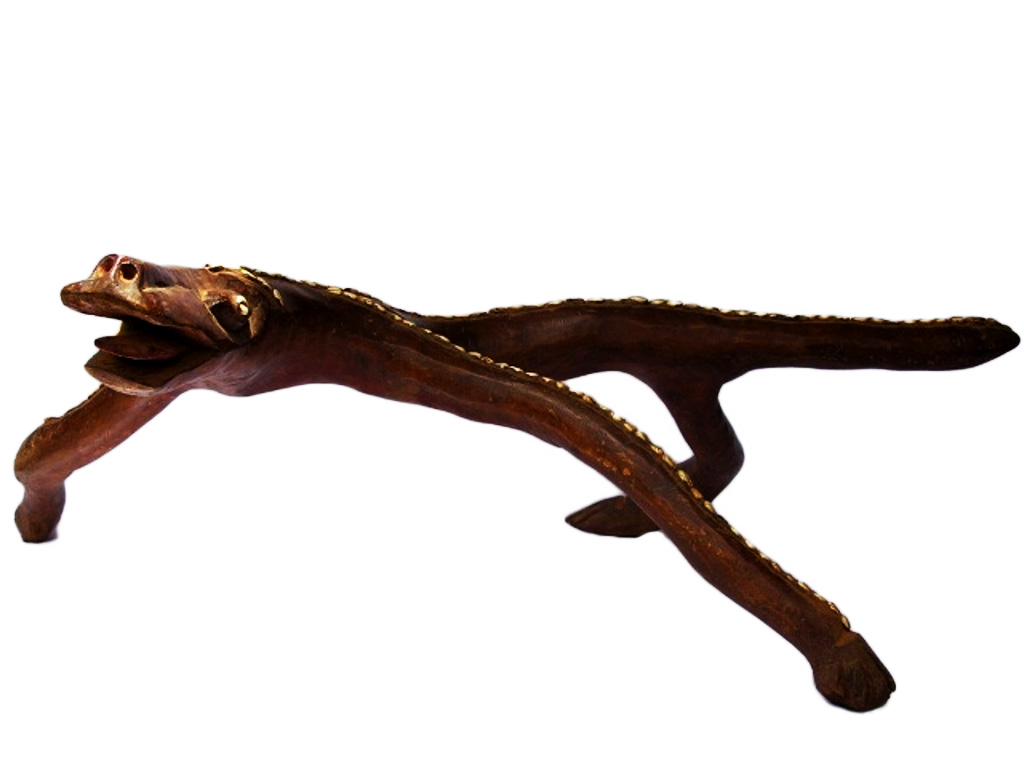
Flying Monster

== See also ==
- Kumbo
