= Battle of Kumbo =

- Part of the Anglophone Crisis
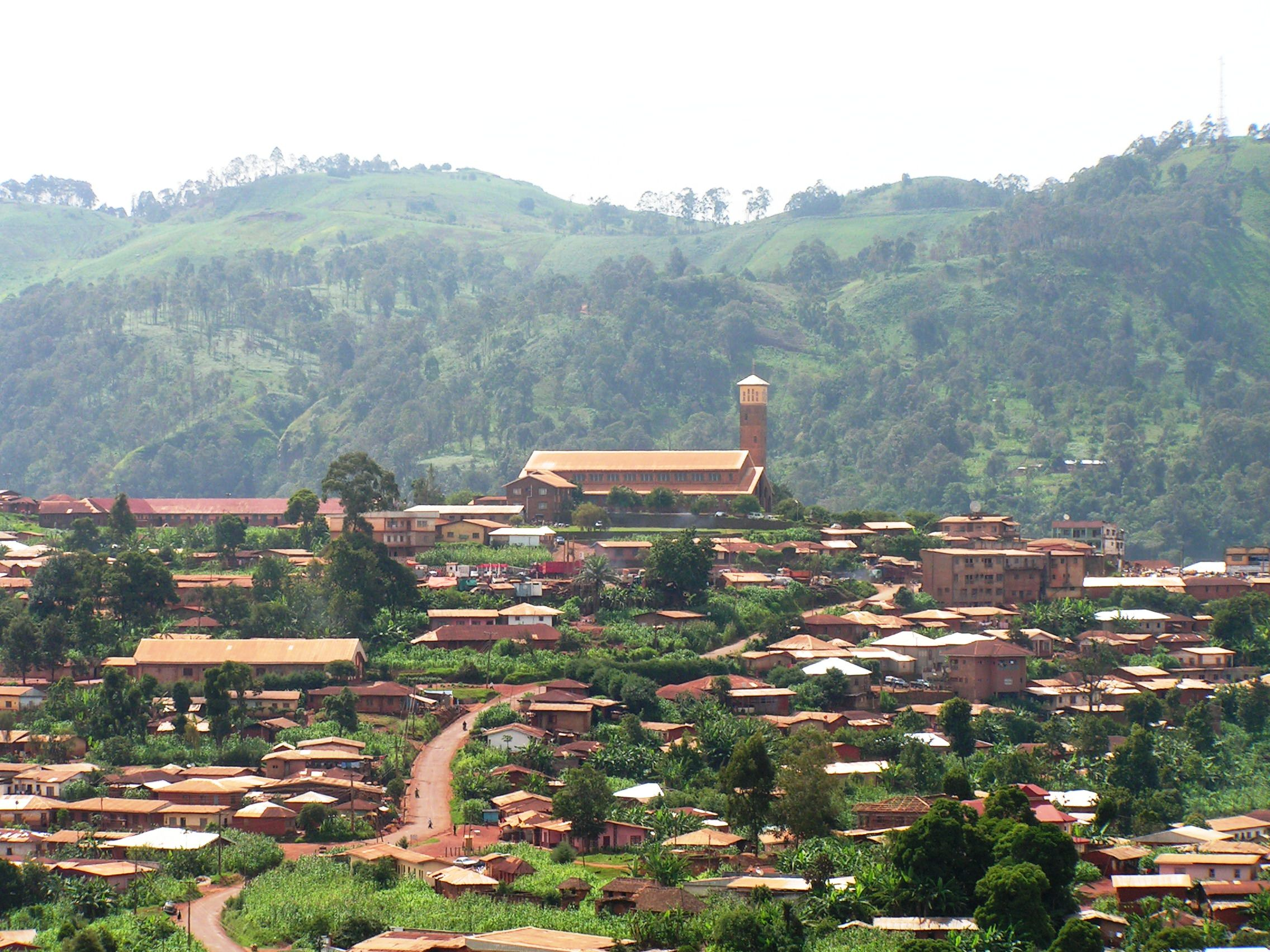
- Photo of Kumbo and surrounding hills in 2012
Date	10 April 2024
Location	Kumbo and surroundings, Bui, Cameroon
Result	Both sides claim victory

Belligerents
Cameroon	Ambazonia

Commanders and leaders
Menyong Gilbert Sunday	Unknown

Units involved
Rapid Intervention Battalion (BIR)	Bui Unity Warriors

Casualties and losses
1–4 killed	Several killed
- 3 civilians killed

On early 10 April 2024, Ambazonian separatist rebels of the Bui Unity Warriors attacked the base of the Cameroonian Rapid Intervention Battalion in Kumbo, resulting a battle that lasted for hours. Several insurgents and at least one Cameroonian soldier were killed. After the rebel main force had retreated from the town, Cameroonian security forces conducted raids and revenge attacks in and around Kumbo in response to the initial attack. News sites reported that civilians were among those killed by the soldiers, though this was denied by the local military leadership.

== Background ==
After the beginning of the Anglophone Crisis, Ambazonian rebels began to operate in the Northwest Region's department Bui whose center is Kumbo. The separatists enjoyed some advantage in the area as its mountainous terrain and poor infrastructure made it difficult for the security forces to clear them out. Several different rebel groups began operating in the area.

In 2021, Cameroonian security forces conducted Operation Bui Clean to destroy the rebel presence in and around Kumbo. Even though government forces claimed victory, armed separatist groups continued to operate in Bui department. In early 2024, separatists attempted to disrupt local Youth Day celebrations.

== Battle ==
Shortly after midnight on 10 April 2024, a group of Ambazonian rebels entered Kumbo and launched an attack on the town's main camp of the Rapid Intervention Battalion (BIR), the government's important counterinsurgency unit. The attackers reportedly belonged to the Bui Unity Warriors. According to eyewitnesses, the two sides engaged in fierce combat at the camp and in the hills around Kumbo. The town itself was damaged by the fighting.

By dawn, the insurgents retreated from the area with some loot which they subsequently showcased on social media, claiming that they had killed four BIR soldiers. A local military source, cited by Cameroon Concord, confirmed the death of one government soldier, while several rebels had also died. In revenge for the demise of their comrade, local security forces subsequently raided several locations in and around Kumbo. According to the Cameroon News Agency, soldiers killed one insurgent and three civilians in a "rampage" at Bamfem, while burning houses in three villages. A handicapped, 90 years-old man was reportedly among the victims. The local senior divisional officer, Menyong Gilbert Sunday, subsequently claimed that his troops had killed four separatist fighters in Kumbo's Ndzengvev neighborhood, denying that any civilians had been harmed. Sunday further stated that the soldiers had seized weaponry and destroyed a shrine of the separatists.

== Aftermath ==
On 30 April 2024, the BIR opened a new military base in Kumbo to better secure the area.
