= Sylvie Vernyuy Njobati =

Cameroonian activist (born 1991)

- Born: 1991 (age 34–35); Cameroon
- Education: University of Bamenda
- Occupations: journalist Activist; Filmmaker
- Website: https://sylvienjobati.com/

Sylvie Vernyuy Njobati (born 1991) is a Cameroonian documentary filmmaker, cultural activist, journalist, and founder of RegArtless. She is known for her efforts in ensuring the return of Cameroon's artifacts back to the home country.

== Early life ==
Born in Banso, Northwest Cameroon, in 1991, she grew up with her mother and grandfather in the Anglophone region of Cameroon.

== Education ==
In 2012, Njobati moved to Yaoundé, where she studied business management and development. She holds a Master's degree in Theatre, Television and Film Studies from the University of Bamenda.

== Career ==
Njobati founded a cultural centre called Sysy House of Fame in 2016. This cultural centre is where she manages theatre plays and showcases cultural projects to the Nso people.

In 2018, she participated in a film workshop of Goethe Institut, Yaoundé named Heritage & Colonial History. Her first short film titled The Twist of Return was screened during festivals in Africa and Europe.

In 2024, she was nominated for the African Rising Activism Awards.
