= Ngonnso =

Effigy of the founder of the Nso dynasty and people

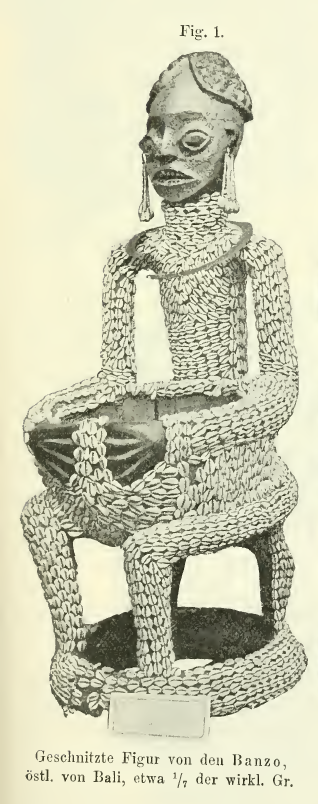
- Medium: Wood with cowrie shells
- Location: Ethnological Museum of Berlin, Berlin

Ngonnso (14th—15th century) is of cultural significance to the Nso people. She is believed to be the founder of Nso kingdom. After her death, a wooden statue nearly a meter tall covered with cowrie shells was created in her honor as a symbol of hope and peace.

In 1902, this statue was taken by Kurt Von Pavel, and donated to the Ethnological Museum of Berlin in Germany in 1903.

== History ==
Ngonnso founded the Nso kingdom following a conflict with her two brothers. After her death, a statue was made in her honour. This statue was stolen by Kurt von Pavel and donated to the Berlin Ethnolgical Museum in 1903.

== Cultural significance ==
Ngonnso is considered mother deity, a symbol of hope and peace. She has an integral connection to the founding history of the Nso kingdom. The statue is named after a princess, who left Rifem in the Adamawa Region of Cameroon during the fight against the choice of a successor to the throne, and later established a new kingdom called Nso. As a deity, rituals are performed around her to ensure the survival and livelihood of the community. In order to ensure passing of historical knowledge and cultural practices form one generation to another, stories and oral history about Ngonnso are told.

== Reparation efforts ==
After the disappearance of the Ngonnso in 1902, the Nso people were left without a cultural reference and suffered a spiritual vacumm. The Nwerong Regulatory Society was charged with finding and returning Ngonnso to the Nso Fondom Palace. In 1974, Bongasu Tanla Kishani, a Nso scholar and student in Germany, discovered a female figure statue in the Ethnologisches Museum in Berlin-Dahlem that he believed represented Ngonnso, whom the Nso community had considered lost. After further research, the female figure statue was confirmed to be Ngonnso in 1988 with the Nso Palace informed of the discovery. The initiation of the statue's return to Cameroon was considered by the Foundation board because of the integral role it plays in the Nso Kingdom. Following the identification of Ngonnso in 1988, efforts to secure the figure's return developed gradually through diplomatic, community and cultural channels. In 1998, a restitution request from Fon Sehm Mbinglo I (paramount ruler of the Nso people) was submitted to the Prussian Cultural Heritage Foundation (SPK) by Professor Godfrey Tangwa, the request did not produce a response. Nso community members subsequently organised through diaspora networks, including a Yahoo! discussion group established in 2005. From 2007, the restitution campaign became increasingly visible through the Ngonnso Cultural Festival, cultural advocacy and diplomatic engagement. In 2008, Fon Seem Mbinglo I submitted an official request to the Cameroonian government to support the return of Ngonnso, there was no response. Professor Godfrey Tangwa presented documentation concerning Ngonnso to German President Horst Köhler, while a replica of the figure, Maandze Ngaiy, was installed at the Nso palace as part of the cultural festival.

In 2016, Nso representatives Dzebam Godlove and Semaiy Gad Shinyuy located Ngonnso in the Ethnological Museum in Berlin, confirming the figure's continued presence in the museum's collection. In 2019, Germany established the Contact Point for Collections from Colonial Contexts to support dialogue and facilitate the handling of restitution claims concerning objects acquired during the colonial period. In December 2021, representatives of the Nso community in Cameroon and Germany, German museum officials and scholars held discussions on the provenance and significance of the statue. The Ethnologisches Museum acknowledged that the presence of colonial officer Kurt von Pavel and his armed entourage represented unequal power relations and structural colonial violence. The museum also recognised Ngonnso's spiritual significance to the Nso as a mother deity. These discussions contributed to the decision to return the statue to Cameroon.

In June 2022, the Board of Trustees of the Prussian Cultural Heritage Foundation authorised its president to conclude an agreement for Ngonnso's return to Cameroon. The decision came after negotiations involving German cultural institutions, Cameroonian authorities and representatives of the Nso community. Subsequently, the Ethnologisches Museum decided that Ngonnso would not be publicly exhibited again before her return. The Government of Cameroon established an inter-ministerial committee to negotiate the restitution of cultural property on behalf of communities. Later that year, the Fon of Nso, Sehm Mbinglo I, visited Germany and reconnected with Ngonnso during a working visit to the Humboldt Forum. The restitution process moved into formal discussions between Cameroonian authorities and the German museums. A Cameroonian restitution delegation held working discussions with German museum representatives in 2023, and in January 2024 Cameroonian delegates and representatives of traditional authorities again visited museums in Berlin, where negotiations concerning Ngonnso and other objects from Cameroon continued.

As of December 2024, the physical return of Ngonnso to Cameroon had not yet taken place, although the Prussian Cultural Heritage Foundation had formally authorised her restitution in 2022. In addition to Ngonnso, negotiations were underway to return 27 other royal and cultural objects of the Nso kingdom, kept at the Linden Museum in Stuttgart.

=== Sylvie Vernyuy Njobati's effort in bringing Ngonnso back home ===
The restitution campaign pursued by members of the Nso diaspora and activists, including Njobati, whose #BringBackNgonnso campaign in 2008 brought wider international attention to the case. In November 2022, the Fon of Nso, Sehm Mbinglo, visited Germany and met with representatives of the Ethnologisches Museum and the Prussian Cultural Heritage Foundation in connection with the restitution process. Discussions also concerned other Nso royal objects held in German collections. The dialogue intensified in 2021 through her Bring Back Ngonnso initiative, made Hermann Parzinger, the president of Prussian Cultural Heritage Foundation (SPK) agreed to the return, and Njobati delivered a signed official restitution request.

The case has been framed within broader debates about reparatory justice. Njobati has argued that the return of Ngonnso should not be understood solely as the recovery of a cultural object, but as part of a wider process of addressing the effects of colonialism. In a 2026 interview with Amnesty International, she linked reparatory justice to the reclamation of historical narratives, access to information, community awareness, and processes of repair and healing. Scholars and institutions involved in restitution debates have likewise situated the Ngonnso case within wider discussions concerning the treatment of African cultural heritage acquired during European colonial rule.

== See also ==
- Benin Bronzes
