= Elak-Oku =

- Commune and town
- Location in Cameroon
- Coordinates: 6°14′48″N 10°30′22″E
- Country: Cameroon
- Time zone: UTC+1 (WAT)

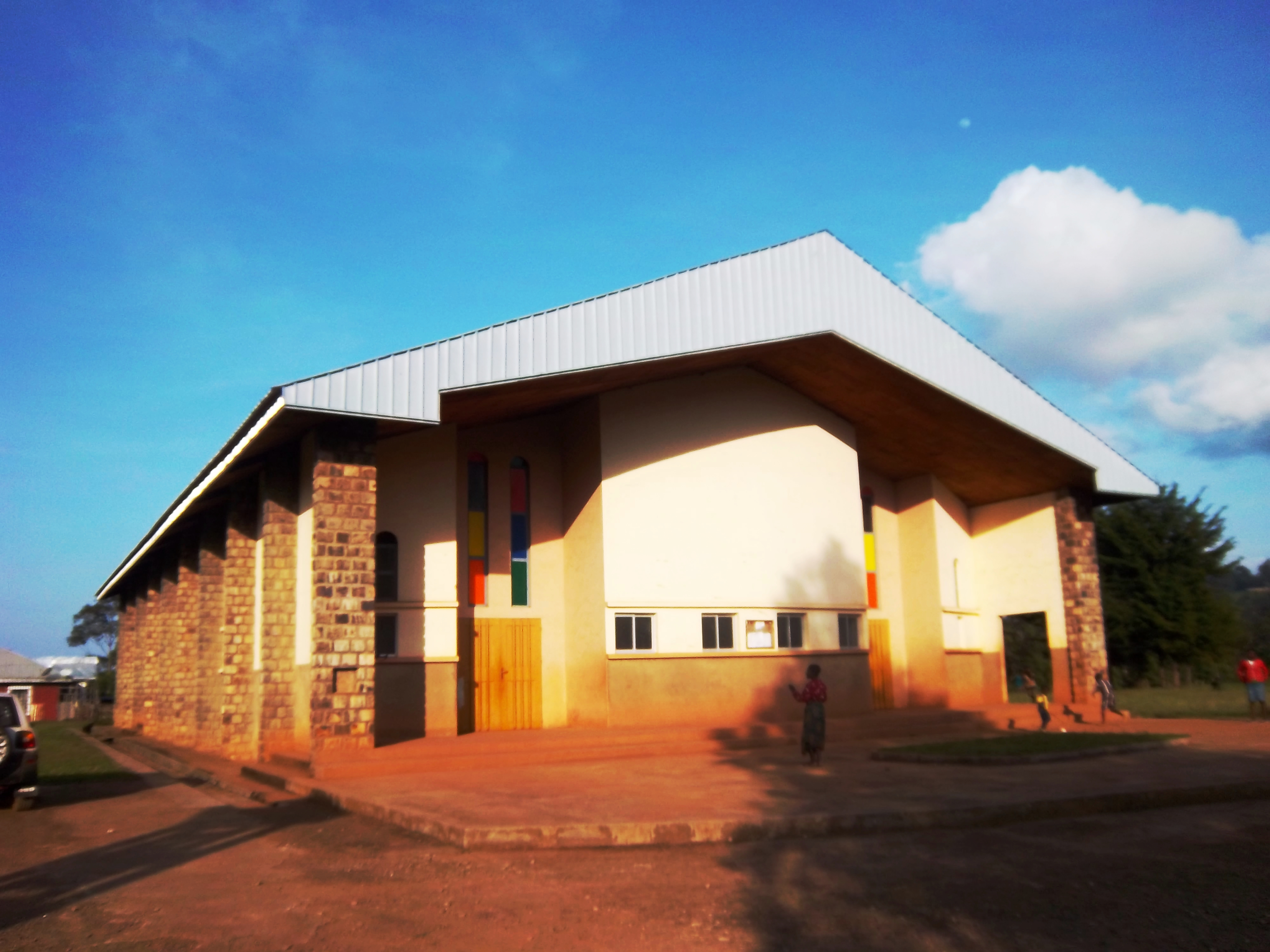
Saint John the Baptist Parish Church, Elak-Oku

Elak-Oku is a town and commune in Cameroon.

== See also ==
- Communes of Cameroon
