= Jakiri =

Town in Northwest Region, Cameroon

Coordinates: 6°06′N 10°39′E

- Commune and town
- Interactive map of Jakiri
- Country: Cameroon
- Region: Northwest
- Department: Bui Division

Population (2005)
  - Total: 47,022
- Time zone: UTC+1 (WAT)

Jakiri is a town and commune in Cameroon. It lies on the Ring Road in the Northwest Region. Its central roundabout is the intersection of roads heading to Foumban, Kumbo, and Bamenda.

== Villages of Jakiri ==
Beside Jakiri town, the subdivision comprises the following villages:

- Dzekwa
- Ber
- Kiluun-Shiy
- Kinsenjam
- Kwanso
- Limbo
- Mbokam
- Mbokija
- Mensai
- Nkar
- Nkarkui
- Nkartsen
- Nooy
- Ntotti
- Ntseimbang
- Ntur
- Roontong
- Sop
- Tan
- Vekovi
- Wainamah
- Wasi
- Wvem
- Yer

== See also ==
- Communes of Cameroon
