= Mbiame =

Coordinates: 6°10′N 10°47′E

- Commune and town
- Interactive map of Mbiame
- Country: Cameroon
- Time zone: UTC+1 (WAT)

Mbiame is a town and commune in Cameroon.

== See also ==
- Communes of Cameroon
