= Valere Nka =

Cameroonian general

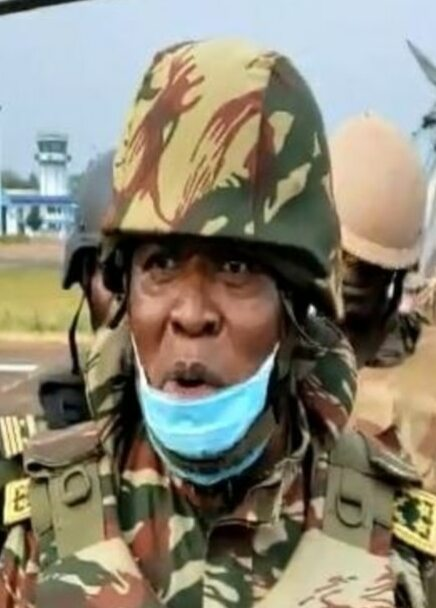
Valere Nka

Brig. Gen. Valere Nka is a Cameroonian general who has commanded Cameroonian soldiers in the Boko Haram insurgency and the Anglophone Crisis. He has also served as Defence Attaché to Nigeria.

In February 2017, Nka was named chief of the 4th Inter-Army Military Region in charge of fighting Boko Haram. The appointment came after the previous chief, General Jacob Kodji, died in a helicopter accident a few days prior. Nka had already been involved in the fight against Boko Haram for some time, and had been second in command for the coalition forces fighting around Lake Chad.

Following his replacement in the north, Nka was deployed to Northwest Region to lead the fight against Ambazonian separatists. In January 2020, he threatened to assassinate several prominent separatist generals if they did not surrender; this ultimatum was followed shortly by the capture and murder of "General Chacha" of the Southern Cameroons Restoration Forces.
