= Kumbo =

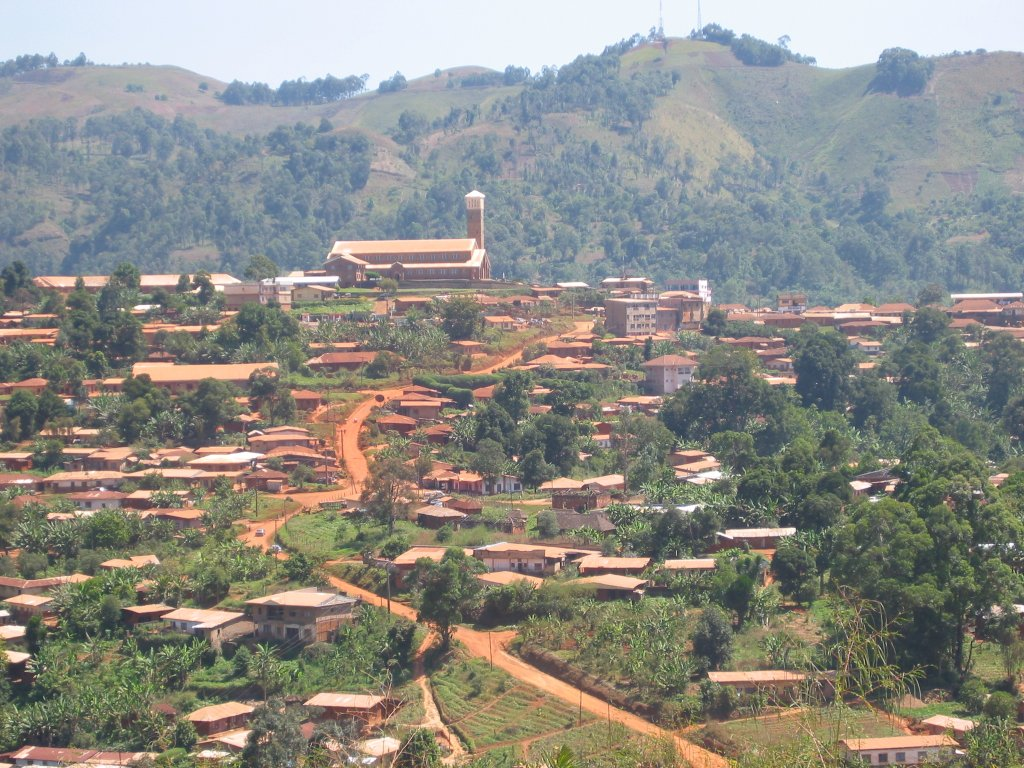
- View from Tobin looking towards Squares and the Catholic Cathedral.
- Nickname: KIMBO
- Location in Cameroon
- Coordinates: 6°12′18″N 10°41′6″E
- Country: Cameroon
- Province: Northwest Region

Government
  - Mayor: Wayne Ngouhouo
  - Deputy Mayor: Donovan Nguendjou
  - City Manager: Alloysius Tchamda
  - Deputy City Manager: Kyle Temgoua
- Elevation: 5,900 ft (1,800 m)

Population (2005)
  - Total: 80,212 (Census)

Kumbo, also known as Kimbo, is the second-largest city in the North West Province of Cameroon and the capital of Bui Division. It lies about 2000m above sea level and is situated approximately 110 km away from Bamenda (the provincial capital of the North West Province), on the Bamenda Highlands Ring Road. Kumbo has a population of 80,212 (at the 2005 Census) and is split into three distinctive hilly settlements of Tobin, Mbveh, and Squares. The town is known for horse racing (Tobin Stadium) and traditional medicine, and also for its palace (Nso Palace), a market and two hospitals (Shisong Hospital & Banso Baptist Hospital). Kumbo is the capital city of the Nso Kingdom of the Nso people. The lingua franca is Lamnso but Pidgin, English, Oku, Djottin, Fulfulde, French and Hausa are spoken.

== History ==
The first German settlers were Missionaries of the Sacred Heart who arrived in 1912 and established their mission in 1913.

In recent years, Kumbo has been a battleground in the ongoing Anglophone Crisis. In May and June 2021, the Cameroonian Army carried out "Operation Bui Clean" to expel Ambazonian separatists from the city and its surroundings. The battles in Kumbo saw both sides suffer heavy casualties.

In April 2024, seaparatist insurgents carried out a substantial attack on Kumbo.

== Places of interest ==
=== Musa Heritage Gallery (or Mus'Art Gallery) ===
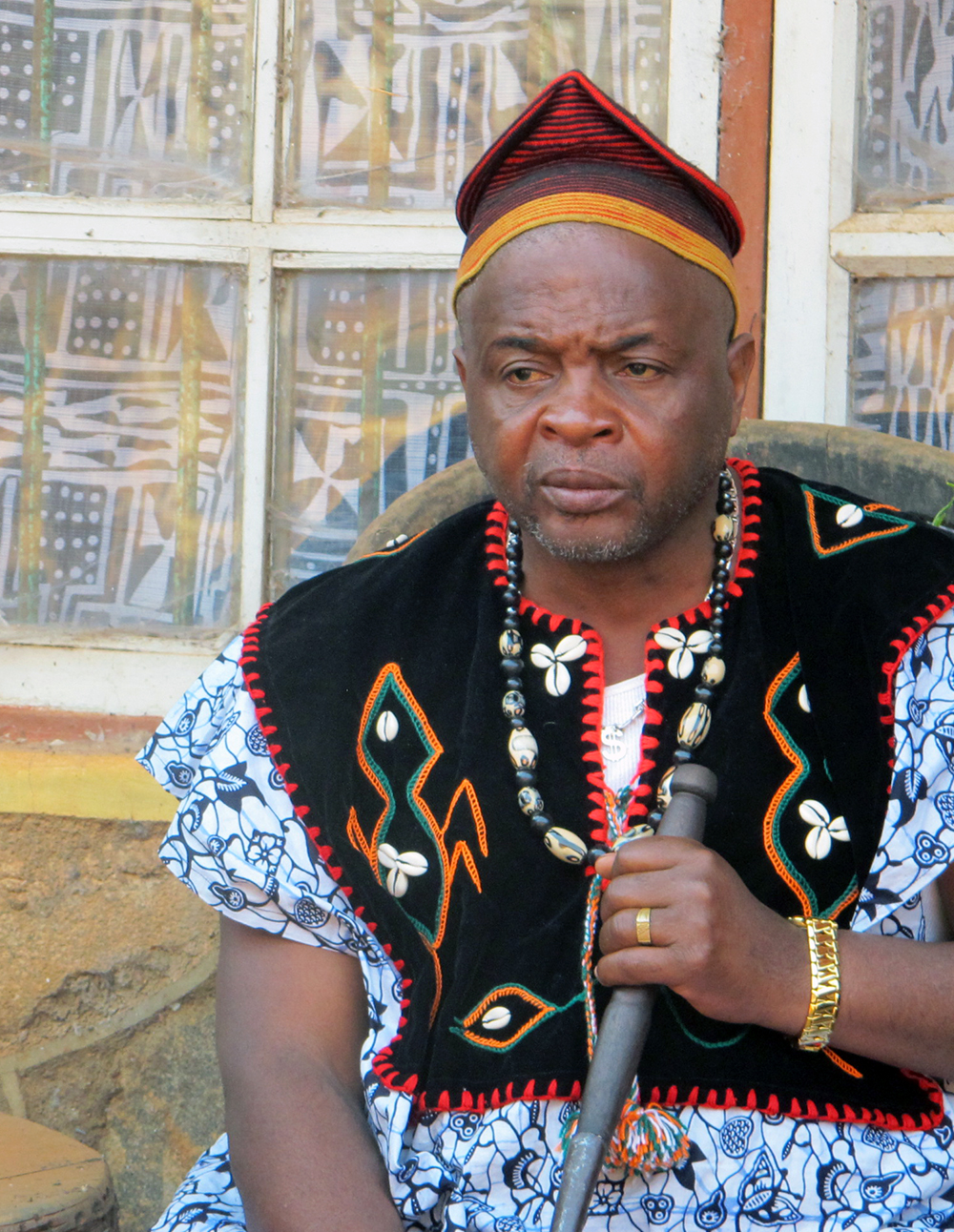
Sehm Mbinglo I

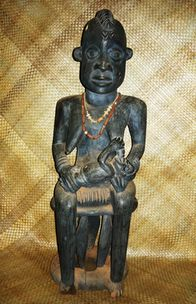
Mother and child (Musa Heritage Gallery, Kumbo, Cameroon)

The Musa Heritage Gallery museum also known as "The Grassfields Museum" was created in 1996, in memory of Cameroonian artists Daniel Kanjo Musa and his elder son, John, to preserve wood sculptures created by these departed artists. Over the years, Mus'Art has been expanding to diversify its collection. Among the 400 objects and works of art exhibited, visitors can admire carved masks, wood statues and other objects made by the Musas between 1970 and 2000. There are other objects collected from the grass-fields, such as traditional musical instruments, hunting gadgets, metal works, bamboo objects and pottery. Temporary exhibitions are also sometimes proposed.

Mus'Art Gallery's motto is "Discover, Learn, Preserve."

Mus’Art Gallery’s mission:
-Propagate Nso’ cultural Mus’Art Gallery’s mission:heritage; -Preserve in response to the loss of the precious art objects so the art of the past is not lost to the region;

-support the arts and crafts of the Western Grass-fields of Cameroon;
-highlight the excellence and diversity of regional artists, past and present, so these may become known nationally and internationally;
-make the arts and crafts of this region of Cameroon known publicly in Cameroon and internationally.

During the past sixteen years the Mus'Art Gallery has been active in propagating the Nso' cultural heritage. The museum has been at the forefront of promoting Nso’ traditional artistry and craftsmanship. Mus’Art Gallery has a collection of over 400 objects most of which were created between 1970 and 2000. These varied and diverse objects range from bamboo work to wood carvings, basketry to pottery.

The museum continues to acquire contemporary Cameroonian arts and crafts while maintaining a major focus on the Western Grass-fields region. This region is internationally renowned for having produced masterpieces of African art.

Unfortunately these objects were appropriated by colonial missionaries and officers and removed from their place of origin to museums in Europe or the United States of America. Masterpieces of Grass-fields art are today in foreign museums and it is most likely they will never be returned. The statue of Ngonnso’ founder the Nso’ kingdom is kept in a museum in Germany. In Nso’ there is an outcry for this statue to be returned to its people.

The museum continues to acquire contemporary Cameroonian arts and crafts while maintaining a major focus on the Western Grass-fields region. This region is internationally renowned for having produced masterpieces of African art.

=== The Fon's Palace ===
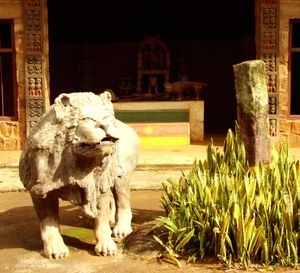
Inner courtyard of the Nso' Fon's Palace in Kumbo

Seat of the paramount chief of the Nso people (Sehm Mbinglo I), this place is the heart of Kumbo social and cultural life. It is composed of several traditional buildings decorated with wood carvings, around two courtyards where the Fon uses to sit and receive his people or his advisers. There is a statue of Ngonso, the legendary first queen of the Nso people. Around the palace, other traditional buildings are also decorated with wood carvings. They are the seats of the sacred societies in charge to help the Fon in his task : the Ngwerong society and the Nggiri society. A mosque was built next to them, although most of Nso people are Christians.

=== The Cathedral ===
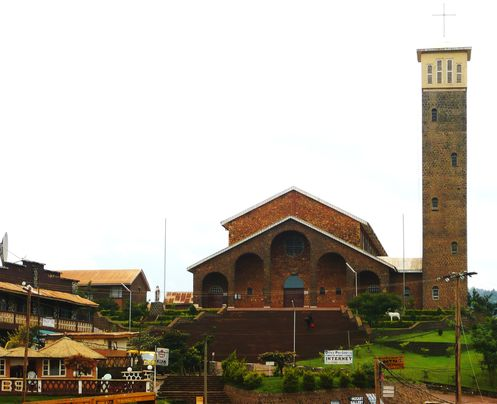
Kumbo Cathedral on the top of Square

Built in the 1950s, Kumbo Cathedral is constructed entirely from stones. The Cathedral is located at the top of the square hill, dominating the town's landscape. The Cathedral is the seat of the Bishop since its creation in 1983. The current bishop of Kumbo is George Nkuo (ordained on 8 July 2006). Prior to that, Bishop Cornelius Fontem Esua served the Diocese of Kumbo from 10 September 1982 to 7 December 2004.

=== Horse riding ===
The origin of horse racing in Kumbo was influenced by The Mbororos, a nomadic tribe of cattle breeders originally from the west and north-west Central African Republic with a settlement in the Bamenda plateau grasslands. An integral part of Mbororos culture is horse racing. Through their influence, there is a famous annual horse race which takes place at the Tobin Municipal Stadium organised by the Ministry of Youths and Sports.

=== The Mbve market ===
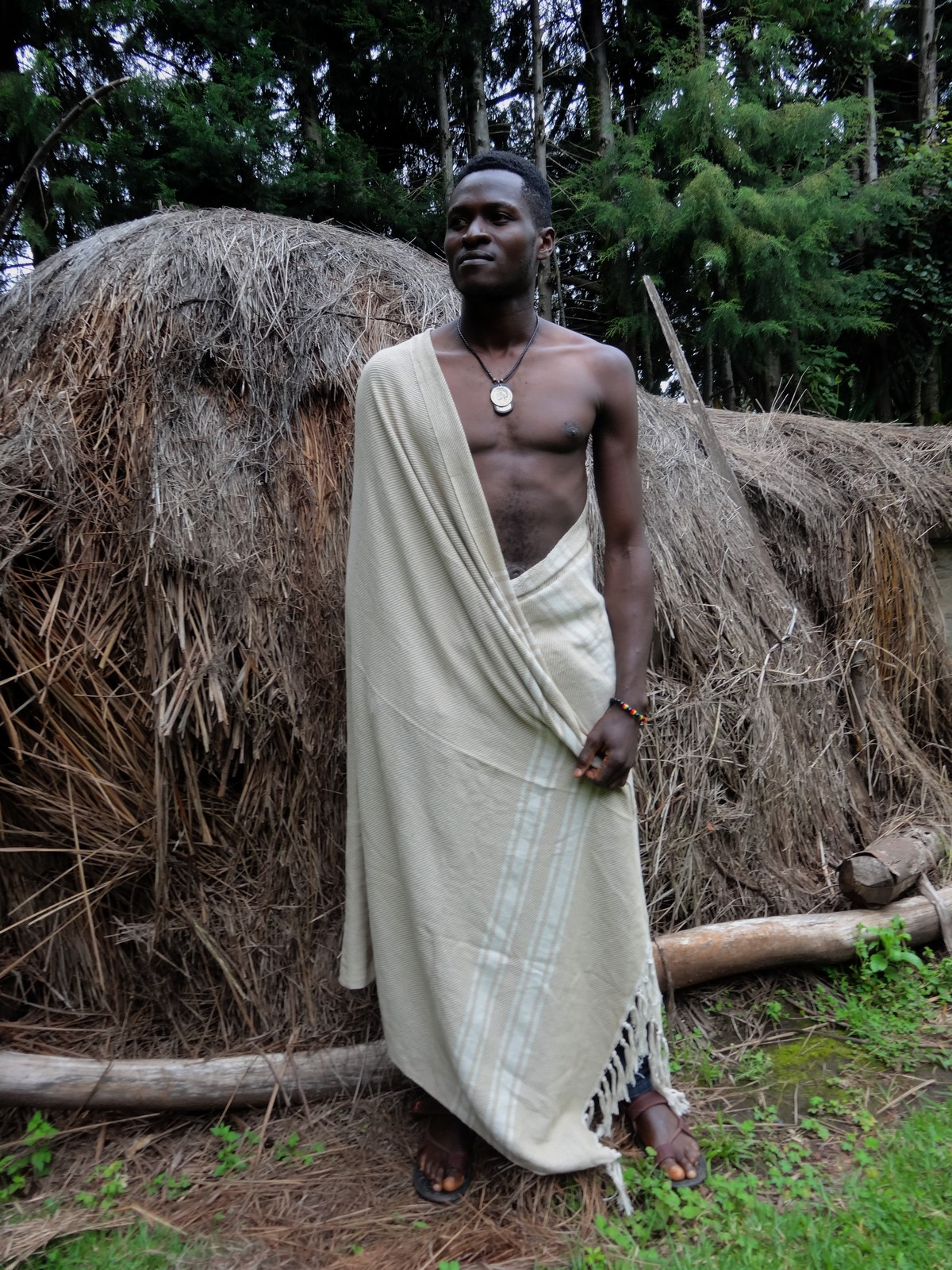
The Ranch man

The Mbve market is the main market in Kumbo selling products from the region, Cameroon, Nigeria and other parts of Africa.
