= Nso language =

Grassfields language of Cameroon

Nsɔ
- Lamnsɔ’
- Native to: Cameroon
- Native speakers: 240,000 in Cameroon (2005)
- Language family: Niger–Congo?: Atlantic–Congo; Benue–Congo; Southern Bantoid; Grassfields; Ring; Nsɔ

Language codes
- ISO 639-3: lns
- Glottolog: lamn1239

Nsọ
- People: Nsọ
- Language: Lam-Nsọ’

Nso (Lamnso, Lamnsɔ’) is the Grassfields language of the Nso people of western Cameroon. A few may remain in Nigeria. It has ten major noun classes. The ISO 639-3 code is lns. Nso is spoken by over 100,000 people.

== Phonology ==
=== Consonants ===
		Labial	Alveolar		Palatal	Velar	Labial- velar	Glottal
		Labial	plain	sibilant	Palatal	Velar	Labial- velar	Glottal
Nasal		m	n		ɲ	ŋ		
Plosive/ Affricate	voiceless	(p)	t	(t͡s)	t͡ʃ	k	k͡p	ʔ
Plosive/ Affricate	voiced	b	d	(d͡z)	d͡ʒ	ɡ	ɡ͡b	
Plosive/ Affricate	prenasal vl.		ⁿt	(ⁿt͡s)	ᶮt͡ʃ	ᵑk	ᵑᵐk͡p	
Plosive/ Affricate	prenasal vd.	ᵐb	ⁿd	(ⁿd͡z)	ᶮd͡ʒ	ᵑɡ	ᵑᵐɡ͡b	
Fricative	voiceless	f		s	ʃ			(h)
Fricative	voiced	v				ɣ		
Fricative	prenasal	ᶬf		ⁿs	ᶮʃ			
Tap			ɾ					
Approximant			l		j		w	

- Stop sounds /b, t, d, k, ɡ/ may have affricated phonetic variants as [b͡v, t͡s, d͡z~ɖ͡ʐ, k͡f, ɡ͡v] when occurring before /ə/. Sounds /ɣ, m/ may have variants as [ɣ͡v, ᶬv] when in the same position.
- Sounds /p/ and /h/ only occur in interjections, ideophones or loanwords.
- /p, t, k/ may also have aspirated allophones [pʰ, tʰ, kʰ] in word-initial positions.
- Prenasal fricative sounds /ᶬf, ⁿs, ᶮʃ/ may also have allophones as prenasal affricate [ᶬp͡f, ⁿt͡s, ᶮt͡ʃ] sounds.
- Sounds /d͡ʒ, ʃ, k, ɡ, m, ŋ/ may be labialized as [d͡ʒʷ, ʃʷ, kʷ, ɡʷ, mʷ, ŋʷ] when before a vowel, and occurring only in the first syllable.

=== Vowels ===
	Front	Central	Back
Close	i		u
Mid	ɛ ~ e	ə	ɔ ~ o
Open		a	

- Vowels are lengthened as /iː, eː, əː, aː, oː, uː/.
- Sounds /ɛ, ɔ/ may also be heard as close-mid [e, o] in free variation.
- Vowels /i, a, u/ are heard as [ɪ, ɜ, ʊ] when before /ʔ/ or nasal sounds.

== Writing System ==
Nso uses an orthography based on the General Alphabet of Cameroon Languages (AGLC). An orthography had initially been created before being modified to follow the recommendations of the AGLC.

Nso alphabet
a	b	c	d	e	ə	f	g	h	i	j	k	l	m	n	ŋ	o	p	r	s	t	u	v	w	y	z	ʼ

Nso uses 23 digraphs ⟨bv, dz, gb, gh, gv, gw, jw, kf, kp, kw, mb, mf, mt, mv, nj, ns, nt, ny, ŋg, ŋk, ŋw, sh, ts⟩ and 7 trigraphs ⟨ghv, mbv, ndz, nsh, ŋgv, ŋgw, shw⟩. Long vowels are indicating by doubling the vowel ⟨aa, ee, əə, ii, oo, uu⟩. Diphthongs are noted ⟨ay, ey, əy, oy, uy, iy⟩.

The high tone is indicated with the acute accent and the low tone with the grave accent on the vowel.

== Phrases ==
- Beri wo. Thank you.
- Wiykijuŋ. You are welcome.
- A sahka? What news? (Greeting).
- Sah ka yo dzə. No news (Reply) or M bo sa. I am fine.
- Yirannia. Good morning.
- A sahka mbuni. How did you sleep?
- Aresi nia. Good afternoon.
- Yi ginia. Good evening.
- Buni kijuŋ. Sleep well.
- A ber ni kibveshi. Good bye until tomorrow.
- Njemse juŋsi. Sweet dreams.
- Wuna wosa. And to you.
- Nyuy sævi wo. God bless you (Greeting).
- Vishi vejuŋvi. Good luck.
- Ghan kijuŋ. Safe journey.
- Fo mo. Give me.
- A du fe? Where are you going?
- Yir yee dzə la? What is your name?
- Yir yem dzə Lukoŋ. My name is Lukong.
- A dzə wan la? Whose child are you?
- M dzə wan Lukoŋ. I am Lukong's child.
- Fon Nso dze la? Who is the traditional ruler of Nso?
- Jiŋ yar mo. I am hungry.
- Ki loŋ ki yum mo. I am thirsty.
- M koŋ wo. I love you.
- Marir mo. Marry me.
- A du fee. Where are you going?
- Laisin jaiy wom. Forgive me
- M ker kibam. I have a bag
- Kinga ki te'e. The grass is growing
- Tsehti du šo. Shift it further away
- Dze la ven. Who is this?
- Kikoŋnin ki boŋ. Loving is good

== Animal names ==
- baa: leopard
- jwi: dog
- kan: monkey
- kitam: elephant
- bvèreh: lion
- shishuiy: duiker
- bvey: goat
- njii: sheep
- nyaar: buffalo
- buhn: squirrel
- yo: serpent
- kinchiiy: cricket
- taa ngam: spider
- ngam: tarantula
- kuurra: hyena
- ngvev: chicken
- kibev: he-goat
- kibar: lizard
- kiliim: bat
- tatakong: Stick insect

== Other nouns ==
- shuy: sun
- mindzev: water
- ngwa: book
- nanar: pineapple
- lav: house
- kitukelav: roof
- nsaalav: floor
- shulav: door
- ntah: chair
- gham: rug
- nton: cooking pot
- bowl: (typically a small bowl)
- bar: cup
- nkaa: basket
- sum: farm
- minkkah: firewood
- shishuur: pepper
- chinyuu: spoon
- mintanin: junction
- la' cu: house of worship (church)
- kitengteng: vehicle
- sang: rice
- kitukelav: roof
- saav: file
- tu': Irish potato
- mbulam: sweet potato
- kiku': cocoyam
- kingom: banana
- nyam: meat
- mbang: walking stick
- yiy: mom (mother)
- tar: dad (father)
- jemir: sister (relative)
- tamir: brother (relative)
- feer: relative (A general sense. Example: * M dze feer wo: I am your relative)

== Adjectives ==
- lum: hot
- rə : cold
- Dzer: Heavy.
- Sen: Dark.
- Fer: White
- Shi'ir: Bitter.
- Nyom: Sweet
- nyaaŋ: Calm

== Bibliography ==
- Banyee, William (25 November 2015). "Spelling and pronunciation in Lamso". The Nso heritage.
- McGarrity, Laura and Botne, Robert (2001). Between Agreement and Case Marking in Lamnso. IUWPL 3: Explorations in African Linguistics: From Lamnso' to Sesotho (2001), edited by Robert Botne and Rose Vondrasek, pp. 53–70. Bloomington, IN: Noun classes and categorization: Proceedings of a symposium on categorization and noun classification, Eugene, Oregon, October 1983. Amsterdam: J. Benjamins.
