= Nso people =

Cameroonian people

The Nso or Nso' are a people from the Bamenda Grassfields in the Northwest Region of Cameroon. Their traditional language is Lamnso. Kumbo is the capital city of the traditional Nso' Kingdom.

== History ==
=== Pre-colonial period ===
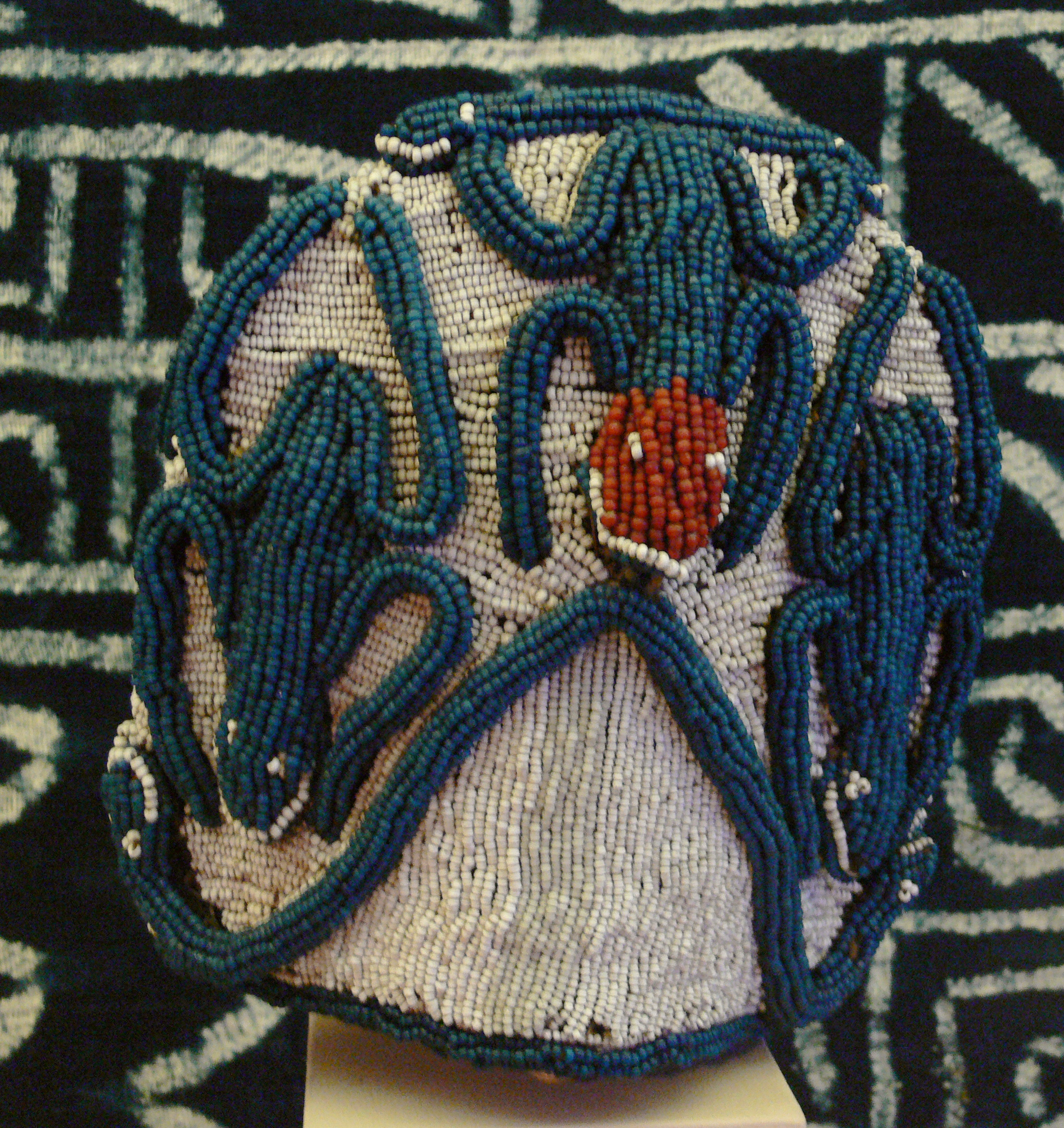
Cap of the Nso people, beadwork on raffia fiber (Linden-Museum, Stuttgart, Germany)

According to Nso' oral tradition, the Nso' dynasty originated from among the Tikar at Kimi (present-day Bankim) in the Adamawa Region of Cameroon. This tradition holds that after the death of the Tikar chief Tinki, a violent succession dispute occurred, resulting in the enthronement of Tinki's successor, Mveing, who drove rival claimants away from Kimi. Among those expelled was Ngonnso', the eventual founder of the Nso' dynasty, who left with her followers, as well as her brother Nchare Yen, the eventual founder of the Bamum kingdom, and her brother Mbombam. Eventually, after parting ways with her brothers, Ngonnso' and her followers settled successively at Mbo'nso', Ndzennso' and Kovifem, then withdrew to Taavisa for security, before returning to Kovifem and finally moving to Kimbo (present-day Kumbo). The Nso' take their name from Ngonnso'.

The traditional ruler of the Nso' is called the Fon. The Fon is both the head of the traditional government and the chief religious authority in charge of keeping the ancestors happy. The Fon is supported in his duties by the seven notables called Vibais. These Vibais are Shufais, whose positions are determined by rather intricate history. These include Shufai Ndzendzev, Tahnkum, Doh, Ruun, Tsenlah, Lun and Yuwar. Over the years, other Shufais have been appointed by the Fon of Nso' without any major political influence, but for the fact that they get a seat at the lower ends of the seating ranks in the palace. His power is kept in check by regulatory groups such as the "Ngwerong" (also "Nwerong") which is in effect the security arm of the government and enforces decisions taken by the Fon. The Nwerong is solely responsible for enthronement of a new Fon. It is also responsible for replacing Fais and Shufais after the death of the incumbent. Members of the royal families (except the Fons) may not become members of the Nwerong. The "Ngiri" resembles the Nwerong, but is only for princes. New Fons are selected from a group of eligible princes by a system kept secret from those eligible, thus eliminating a possible source of corruption.

The princes are called Wontho and regularly meet in the presence of the Fon to discuss family matters. There are other Fons that generally act as advisers to the Fon of Nso'. The existence of these Fons today signifies an evolution in the history of the Nso' people. Most of them were once leaders of independent tribes that through warfare or peaceful negotiations, or through share events of history, came to subordinate the Fon of Nso'. They are the only ones (along with foreign Fons) that are allowed to bring in their own seats (Kavahs) to the Nso' Palace. These, inexhaustively, include the Fons of Oku, Mbiami, Nseh, Nkar, Gwan, Kiluun, Ngashong, Nshokov, Gwarkang, Taabah, etc. The Fons of Oku and Mbiami were once princes of Nso'. All the Fons of Nso' and Shufai Ndzendzev are members of both the Nwerong and the Ngiri.

Nso' society is divided into groups according to lineage. Each lineage group is led by a "Fai". Tradition dictates that the hand of a Fai is not to be shaken. Fais can be recognized by their glass bead necklaces and fancy walking sticks. A Fai is instituted by a Fon. Other leaders are called Sheys, and are a level below the Fais.

=== Colonial period ===
Contact between Europeans and the indigenous peoples of present-day Cameroon began in the 15th century with the arrival of Portuguese explorers to the region, and intensified in the 19th century during the Scramble for Africa. Cameroon became a part of the German Empire in 1884, following the Berlin Conference. Shortly thereafter, German explorers such as Eugen Zintgraff, Karl Ludwig Zeuner, and Franz Thorbecke began exploring and surveying the newly acquired territory. Accounts of the first contact between the Nso' and Zintgraff are distilled from oral retellings by Nso' elders, as well as from German reports currently housed at the National Archives in Yaounde. The first contact involved 8 to 10 Europeans of the expeditionary force of Lt Col Von Pavel from January 1901 to 1902. They marched from Babungo and on January 12 the camped at Sov where they received a gift of a ram from the Fon. It was noted by Lt Von Pavel that the first contact with the Nso' people of Bansso was friendly. According to oral tradition, it was suspected that the reason for later hostilities against the Nso' by German forces was based on fears surrounding the Nso' warrior tradition of collecting and displaying the skulls of defeated enemies. When the Germans were invited to the Nso' manjong (transl. warrior lodge), they saw many skulls hanging on rails and assumed that the Nso' people were cannibals. Hostilities began between October and March with the arrival of a new expedition that was well armed. It was reported that this new group severely beat a man and left him for dead, and also hit an elder with the butt of a gun. These aggressive actions prompted a retaliation by the Nso' who attacked the expedition camp with a force of about 1,200 men. Having been warned of the planned attacked, the explorers burned down the palace and moved the camp.

The early contact between Nso' and the Europeans was marked by a succession of revolts and armed uprisings that were ultimately put down Europeans. Once the Nso' surrendered to the Germans, part of the terms of defeat were to supply indigenous labor for coastal work and to build roads for their new government elites. A new system of taxation, administration, and labor was imposed upon the Nso' people, first by the Germans and then by the British and the French.

The colonial tax system, which entailed indirect rule by the European authorities, undermined the Fon in his sub-chiefdoms. Traditionally, the sub-chiefdoms paid tribute directly to the Fon, but under the new system, the sub-chiefdoms collected taxes in their localities, keeping a portion of the tax revenue as a commission and remitting the balance to the Fon, who was ultimately in charge of tax collection for the colonial administration. The Fon would also retain a commission before remitting the balance of the funds to the colonial authorities, thus making the Fon subordinate to the colonial authorities. In other words, the colonial tax system stripped the Fon of governing authority, and transformed the former kingship headed by the Fon and his council into a figurehead that answered to the Crown.

Colonial authorities depended on the cooperation of regional Fons to rule their colonies. This often resulted in a loss of popular support for collaborationist Fons who enforced colonial policies in order to preserve their standing with colonial officials.

=== Postcolonial period ===
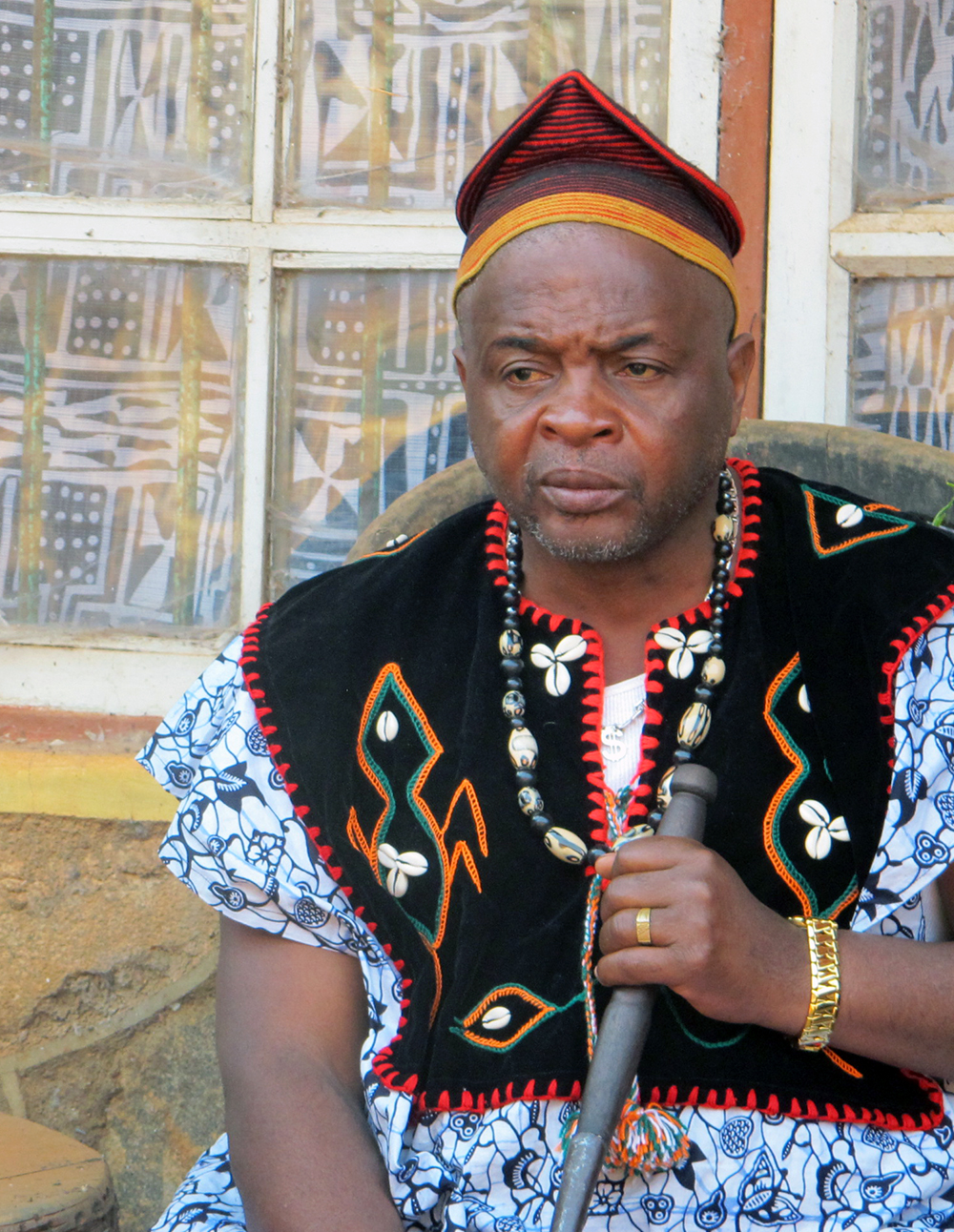
Sehm Mbinglo II, the ruling Fon of the Nso' people, in 2013

Following independence in 1960, the francophone Cameroon joined with anglophone Cameroon to form their current republic. Seeing the fallacies and difficulties of the colonial state, the fledgling post-colonial government aimed to forge a new, self-reliant state centered around using the state itself as the main source of production. On the surface it may appear that the hybrid of parliamentary-style government and the traditional Fon structure was done to pay homage to the foundation upon which the current republic is forged, but it was done to implement a new type of indirect rule. While there are three classifications of chiefs, each class serves as a function of the larger state and turning Fons into clients. This keeps the local people happy by maintaining their traditional systems while at the same time undermining the Fon by not giving him true autonomy. With the changing of legislation, any Fon can be held in contempt or detained for failure to comply.

As of 2013, the Fon of Nso' is Sehm Mbinglo II.

== Gender ==
=== Pre-colonial period ===
The social order of pre-colonial Nso' was hierarchical and patriarchal. Titled men held specific rights and obligations over their dependents, which included regulating access to land and controlling labour input from both men and women. Land ownership, management, and distribution followed customary tenure rules which reflected the prevailing social order. While the Fon held titular ownership, practical land management was vested in lineage heads known as ataanggwen (transl. the men who own the fields). Nso' citizenship guaranteed agricultural land access to all individuals, provided they followed the customary laws of the Fon and lineage heads.

Beyond land management, men consolidated political and social power by exploiting women's reproductive and productive labour. For example, the Fon possessed the right to arrange marriages for his daughters, granddaughters, and the firstborn children of his great- and great-great-granddaughters. Similarly, lineage heads regulated the marriages of nearly all female dependents, and were enriched through receipt of bride-wealth services and gifts provided by husbands. Titled men thus exercised a significant degree of control over traditional Nso' society in ways that served to reinforce and reproduce their authority; they acted as trustees of lineage lands and property, controlled kinship networks, arranged politically strategic marriages, provided wives for young men, led ancestral rituals, and participated in palace societies as members of the Nso' nobility.

Labour was divided along gender and community lines, whereby women were responsible for farming, and men for hunting, warfare, and trade. The men of each village were granted rights to use the lands upon which their families (primarily, their wives) farmed, either by decree of the Fon or by virtue of inheritance. Women's agricultural output subsidized men's participation in trade networks, while their reproductive labour expanded the household's size, status, and workforce. Although women farmed and harvested the land, it was men who retained all surplus value generated agriculturally or otherwise. Regional commerce occasionally involved the exchange of grains for palm oil; however, it was predominantly concentrated on the trade of male-monopolized commodities, such as kola, livestock, handicrafts, iron implements, and palm wine. Furthermore, success in regional trade gave men access to lucrative state-controlled long-distance trade opportunities.

=== Modern gender relations ===
In Men Own the Fields, Women Own the Crops, Miriam Goheen elaborated on the gender inequality in Nso community. This gender inequality is established by the ideology of hegemony among the Nso people. According to Gramsci, "hegemony is the ways in which a governing power wins consent from those it subjugates; it is carried in cultural, political, and economic forms, in non-discursive as well as in theoretical utterances" (Goheen 1996:12). Hegemony is a discourse established in the favor of the government or any given society to control their population. Therefore, the government or the leaders establish laws to back up with this ideology. Hence, it generated inequality among the Nso men and Nso women. This gender inequality is defined by the subjectivity of the women to their men regardless that the women are considered the "backbone of the country" (Goheen 1996: 63). The Nso have an agricultural society and most of their food subsistence comes from farming. Nso women are called the "backbone of the country" because they are the farmers. However, these women do not have any power over what they produce on the farms except to feed their husbands and children with the food crops. In addition, these farmer women do not have any power over their farms because these farms could only be allocated to them by their men. Besides, the Nso women think it is their responsibility to take care of the food supplies of their households and they find great pride and strength in doing it. Therefore, in the Nso community, any woman who is not a farmer is marginalized by the society especially, by the women. Moreover, regardless of the women's power as farmers and the "backbone of the country", they are not allowed into the council of the men. This distinction is made because the Nso men considered their women as inadequate to reason. "Women, say the men, should always listen only to the man. They cannot reason correctly because their hearts get in the way". Only men are required to discuss public matters with the chief or other leaders at the council of men.

== Religion ==
Jujus, masked spirits, are an important part of Nso culture. (The word "Juju" can also refer to some type of magic.) Jujus come out on important occasions. Ngwerong and Ngiri (the prince's society) each have seven jujus, often seen passing by on the way to the death celebration of one of the society members. The passing by of a juju being led by its handlers and followed by children is quite the street performance. Other jujus include groups that dance to drums and xylophones.

Another traditional organization is "Mfu", a warrior society. Each village has its own chapter with its own meeting house where the group gathers every eighth day (the traditional week). It is a place where men in the village can come to hear the latest news and where the village leaders can disseminate information or organize village work. Most Mfu houses are richly decorated with carved posts, both inside and outside. To enter the Mfu house, one must wear a hat and a cutlass, and one must bring a drinking cup to partake in the drinking of "Melu" (raffia palm wine). Each member of Mfu must take their turn supplying the group with palm wine. When a member has done an adequate job of "celebrating" Mfu, the drums will come out for dancing.

== Culture ==
=== Cultural practices and festivals ===
The Nso' people maintain their cultural heritage through traditional institutions, oral traditions, music, dance, masquerades, festivals and other forms of cultural expression. The Ngonnso Cultural Festival is one of the major cultural celebrations of the Nso' people. The festival is named after Ngonnso, whom Nso' oral traditions identify as the founder of the Nso' dynasty. It provides an occasion for Nso' people in Cameroon and the diaspora to gather and showcase aspects of their cultural heritage, including traditional dances, masquerades, music, arts and crafts.

The festival originated as an annual cultural week in the 1950s and was formally recognised in 1976 under Fon Ngah Bifon II. It subsequently became known as the Ngonnso Cultural Festival and was organised as a celebration of Nso' history, cultural identity and heritage. The festival has also served as a means of transmitting cultural knowledge between generations and bringing together Nso' people from within Cameroon and the diaspora.

=== Ngonnso and cultural heritage ===
Ngonnso occupies an important place in Nso' historical and cultural traditions. Nso' oral traditions identify her as the founder of the Nso' dynasty, while historical and anthropological studies have examined traditions concerning the origins and succession of the Nso' ruling dynasty. A wooden figure representing Ngonnso, approximately one metre high and decorated with cowrie shells, is regarded by the Nso' as a spiritually significant representation of their founding figure. The Ethnologisches Museum in Berlin describes Ngonnso as having a central spiritual role for the Nso' and as being regarded as a mother deity.

The figure entered the collection of the Ethnologisches Museum in Berlin in 1903 as part of a donation by the German colonial officer Kurt von Pavel. Its acquisition took place in the context of German colonial rule in the Nso' area. In provenance discussions held in 2021, representatives of the Nso' community, museum officials and scholars examined the circumstances surrounding its removal. The participants concluded that, although the figure had not been removed from Kumbo during an act of warfare, von Pavel's presence with soldiers and armed porters represented unequal power relations and structural colonial violence.

Efforts to secure the return of Ngonnso continued for decades. Members of the Nso' community, traditional authorities and diaspora organisations made approaches to German and Cameroonian authorities concerning the statue. In the 2010s, Nso' diaspora activists in Germany organised protests and other advocacy activities. The campaign gained wider international attention after Nso' activist Sylvie Njobati launched the #BringBackNgonnso campaign, using social media and public advocacy to call for the statue's return.

In December 2021, representatives of the Nso' community in Cameroon and Germany, German museum officials, and scholars held discussions concerning the provenance and significance of Ngonnso. In June 2022, the Board of Trustees of the Stiftung Preußischer Kulturbesitz authorised its president to conclude an agreement with the relevant Cameroonian authorities concerning the statue's return. The decision followed the provenance discussions and recognition of Ngonnso's spiritual importance to the Nso' and the colonial power relations surrounding her acquisition.

In November 2022, Fon Sehm Mbinglo I, the paramount ruler of the Nso' people, visited the Humboldt Forum in Berlin and viewed Ngonnso in person for the first time since becoming Fon. The visit formed part of continuing conciliatory discussions about restitution for the theft of the statue and other Nso' objects held in German collections.
