= Eyoh =

Eyoh is a surname. Notable people with the surname include:

- Effiong Eyoh (born 1996), Nigerian footballer
- Ndumbe Eyoh (1949–2006), Cameroonian theatre director, critic, and playwright

== See also ==
- Eyob
