= Bamu =

Bamu may refer to:

- Mbamu, an island in the Republic of the Congo
- Bamu language, a language of Papua New Guinea
- Bamu Rural LLG, Papua New Guinea
- Bamu River, a river in southwest Papua New Guinea
- Bamu (巴姆), Tibetan-Chinese singer in the Mayu language
- Bamum script, with the ISO 15924 code Bamu, 435

== See also ==
- Bamum (disambiguation)
