= Olezoa =

- Country: Cameroon
- Province: Centre Province
- Division: Mfoundi Division
- Elevation: 710 m (2,330 ft)

Population (2005)
  - Total: 3,996

Olezoa is a neighbourhood of the city of Yaoundé, the capital of Cameroon, located in the district of Yaoundé 3.

== History ==
Olezoa means "Shrub for elephants". Originally it was called Elig Omgba Alima Kie "former stronghold of omgba Alima Kie", a Mvog Atemengue. It was common to Emveng and Mvog Atemengue. For others, it means "the rice of zogo" in reference to the superior chief manguissa who was a rice farmer and was chosen by the colonial administration to experiment with rice cultivation.

== Geography ==
Olezoa is a neighbourhood located in the south of the city of Yaoundé. It is bordered to the north by the Elig Belibi neighbourhood, to the south by Dakar and Mvolyé, and to the east by Mvog Atangana Mbala and Ndamvud. It is also commonly known as "l'ile de France". It is the hydronym of a 5 km long stream that takes its source behind the amphitheater 700 of the University of Yaoundé 1 Ngoa Ekelle, a tributary of the right bank of the Mfundi River.

== Institutions ==
The district is home not only to the French Embassy, but also to the residence of several French diplomatic and military personnel posted in Cameroon, as well as the Ministry of Defense (MINDEF).

== Education ==
- Fustel-de-Coulanges French Primary School
- Olezoa Public School

== Places of worship ==
Olezoa chapel with the name of Saint-Paul parish

== Popular places ==
- Carrefour trois statues
- Mobil Olezoa

== Health ==
- Military hospital
- Veterinary pharmacy
- Pharmacy of Olezoa
