= Valdo =

Male given name and family name

Notable people with the name Valdo include:

== Given name ==
- Valdo Alhinho (born 1988), Angolan footballer
- Valdo (born 1964), Brazilian footballer
- Valdo Randpere (born 1958), Estonian musician, businessman and politician
- Valdo Spini (born 1946), Italian politician
- Valdo H. Viglielmo (1926–2016), American scholar and translator of Japanese literature
- Valdo Williams (1928–2010), American jazz pianist
- Valdo Zeqaj (born 1994), Albanian footballer
- Valdo Calocane, perpetrator of the 2023 Nottingham attacks

== Nickname ==
- Erivaldo Antonio Saraiva (born 1980), also known as Valdo, Brazilian footballer
- Valmiro Lopes Rocha (born 1981), known as Valdo, Cape Verdean footballer
- Valdomiro Soares Eggres (born 1984), known as Valdo, Brazilian footballer
- Andrevaldo de Jesus Santos (born 1992), known as Valdo, Brazilian footballer

== Surname ==
- Muntu Valdo (born 1977), Cameroonian musician
- Peter Valdo (c. 1140 – c. 1218), founder of the Waldensians
