= Tuchscherer =

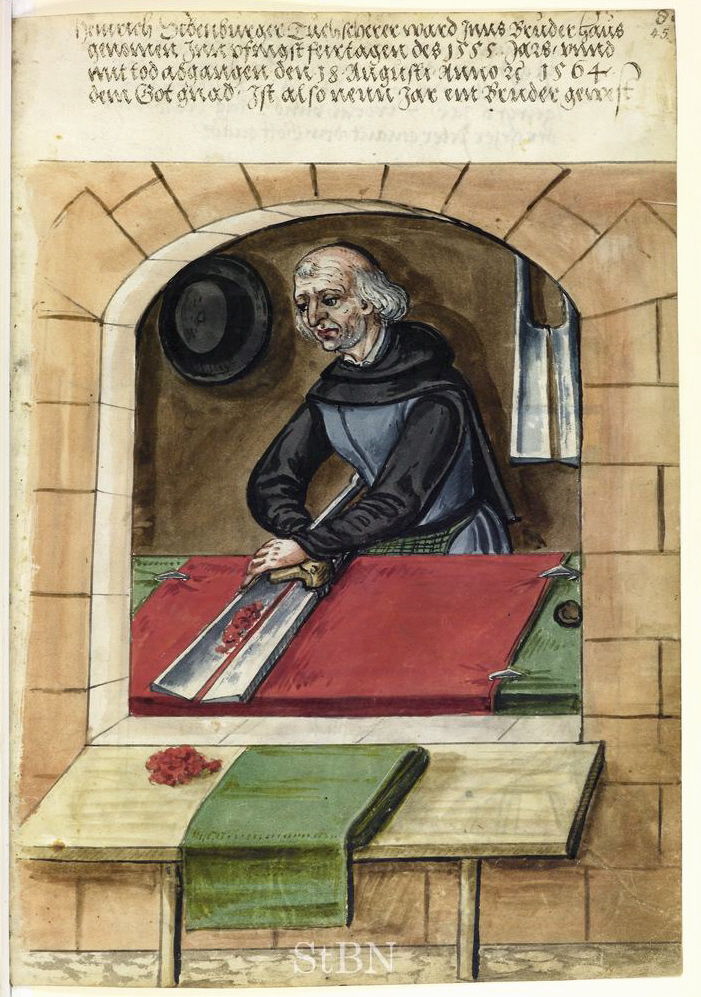
Heinrich Sibenburger: Cloth shearer in Nuremberg (1564)

Tuchscherer (lit. 'cloth shearer') is a German surname. Notable people with the surname include:

- Chris Tuchscherer (born 1975), American mixed martial artist
- Claus Tuchscherer (born 1955), German Nordic combined skier
- Konrad Tuchscherer (born 1970), American educator
- Lennard Tuchscherer (born 1999), German slalom canoeist
