= Bamum =

Bamum, also spelled Bamoum, Bamun, or Bamoun, may refer to:

- The Bamum people
- The Bamum kingdom
- The Bamum language
- The Bamum script
  - Bamum (Unicode block)
- Bamum Scripts and Archives Project
