= Bamum Supplement =

- Range: U+16800..U+16A3F (576 code points)
- Plane: SMP
- Scripts: Bamum
- Assigned: 569 code points
- Unused: 7 reserved code points

Unicode version history
- 6.0 (2010): 569 (+569)

Unicode documentation
- Code chart ∣ Web page

Bamum Supplement is a Unicode block containing the characters of the historic stage A-F of the Bamum script, used for writing the Bamum language of western Cameroon. The modern stage G characters, which include many characters used for stage A-F orthographies, are included in the Bamum block.

== Block ==
Bamum Supplement^{[1]}^{[2]} Official Unicode Consortium code chart (PDF)
	0	1	2	3	4	5	6	7	8	9	A	B	C	D	E	F
U+1680x	𖠀	𖠁	𖠂	𖠃	𖠄	𖠅	𖠆	𖠇	𖠈	𖠉	𖠊	𖠋	𖠌	𖠍	𖠎	𖠏
U+1681x	𖠐	𖠑	𖠒	𖠓	𖠔	𖠕	𖠖	𖠗	𖠘	𖠙	𖠚	𖠛	𖠜	𖠝	𖠞	𖠟
U+1682x	𖠠	𖠡	𖠢	𖠣	𖠤	𖠥	𖠦	𖠧	𖠨	𖠩	𖠪	𖠫	𖠬	𖠭	𖠮	𖠯
U+1683x	𖠰	𖠱	𖠲	𖠳	𖠴	𖠵	𖠶	𖠷	𖠸	𖠹	𖠺	𖠻	𖠼	𖠽	𖠾	𖠿
U+1684x	𖡀	𖡁	𖡂	𖡃	𖡄	𖡅	𖡆	𖡇	𖡈	𖡉	𖡊	𖡋	𖡌	𖡍	𖡎	𖡏
U+1685x	𖡐	𖡑	𖡒	𖡓	𖡔	𖡕	𖡖	𖡗	𖡘	𖡙	𖡚	𖡛	𖡜	𖡝	𖡞	𖡟
U+1686x	𖡠	𖡡	𖡢	𖡣	𖡤	𖡥	𖡦	𖡧	𖡨	𖡩	𖡪	𖡫	𖡬	𖡭	𖡮	𖡯
U+1687x	𖡰	𖡱	𖡲	𖡳	𖡴	𖡵	𖡶	𖡷	𖡸	𖡹	𖡺	𖡻	𖡼	𖡽	𖡾	𖡿
U+1688x	𖢀	𖢁	𖢂	𖢃	𖢄	𖢅	𖢆	𖢇	𖢈	𖢉	𖢊	𖢋	𖢌	𖢍	𖢎	𖢏
U+1689x	𖢐	𖢑	𖢒	𖢓	𖢔	𖢕	𖢖	𖢗	𖢘	𖢙	𖢚	𖢛	𖢜	𖢝	𖢞	𖢟
U+168Ax	𖢠	𖢡	𖢢	𖢣	𖢤	𖢥	𖢦	𖢧	𖢨	𖢩	𖢪	𖢫	𖢬	𖢭	𖢮	𖢯
U+168Bx	𖢰	𖢱	𖢲	𖢳	𖢴	𖢵	𖢶	𖢷	𖢸	𖢹	𖢺	𖢻	𖢼	𖢽	𖢾	𖢿
U+168Cx	𖣀	𖣁	𖣂	𖣃	𖣄	𖣅	𖣆	𖣇	𖣈	𖣉	𖣊	𖣋	𖣌	𖣍	𖣎	𖣏
U+168Dx	𖣐	𖣑	𖣒	𖣓	𖣔	𖣕	𖣖	𖣗	𖣘	𖣙	𖣚	𖣛	𖣜	𖣝	𖣞	𖣟
U+168Ex	𖣠	𖣡	𖣢	𖣣	𖣤	𖣥	𖣦	𖣧	𖣨	𖣩	𖣪	𖣫	𖣬	𖣭	𖣮	𖣯
U+168Fx	𖣰	𖣱	𖣲	𖣳	𖣴	𖣵	𖣶	𖣷	𖣸	𖣹	𖣺	𖣻	𖣼	𖣽	𖣾	𖣿
U+1690x	𖤀	𖤁	𖤂	𖤃	𖤄	𖤅	𖤆	𖤇	𖤈	𖤉	𖤊	𖤋	𖤌	𖤍	𖤎	𖤏
U+1691x	𖤐	𖤑	𖤒	𖤓	𖤔	𖤕	𖤖	𖤗	𖤘	𖤙	𖤚	𖤛	𖤜	𖤝	𖤞	𖤟
U+1692x	𖤠	𖤡	𖤢	𖤣	𖤤	𖤥	𖤦	𖤧	𖤨	𖤩	𖤪	𖤫	𖤬	𖤭	𖤮	𖤯
U+1693x	𖤰	𖤱	𖤲	𖤳	𖤴	𖤵	𖤶	𖤷	𖤸	𖤹	𖤺	𖤻	𖤼	𖤽	𖤾	𖤿
U+1694x	𖥀	𖥁	𖥂	𖥃	𖥄	𖥅	𖥆	𖥇	𖥈	𖥉	𖥊	𖥋	𖥌	𖥍	𖥎	𖥏
U+1695x	𖥐	𖥑	𖥒	𖥓	𖥔	𖥕	𖥖	𖥗	𖥘	𖥙	𖥚	𖥛	𖥜	𖥝	𖥞	𖥟
U+1696x	𖥠	𖥡	𖥢	𖥣	𖥤	𖥥	𖥦	𖥧	𖥨	𖥩	𖥪	𖥫	𖥬	𖥭	𖥮	𖥯
U+1697x	𖥰	𖥱	𖥲	𖥳	𖥴	𖥵	𖥶	𖥷	𖥸	𖥹	𖥺	𖥻	𖥼	𖥽	𖥾	𖥿
U+1698x	𖦀	𖦁	𖦂	𖦃	𖦄	𖦅	𖦆	𖦇	𖦈	𖦉	𖦊	𖦋	𖦌	𖦍	𖦎	𖦏
U+1699x	𖦐	𖦑	𖦒	𖦓	𖦔	𖦕	𖦖	𖦗	𖦘	𖦙	𖦚	𖦛	𖦜	𖦝	𖦞	𖦟
U+169Ax	𖦠	𖦡	𖦢	𖦣	𖦤	𖦥	𖦦	𖦧	𖦨	𖦩	𖦪	𖦫	𖦬	𖦭	𖦮	𖦯
U+169Bx	𖦰	𖦱	𖦲	𖦳	𖦴	𖦵	𖦶	𖦷	𖦸	𖦹	𖦺	𖦻	𖦼	𖦽	𖦾	𖦿
U+169Cx	𖧀	𖧁	𖧂	𖧃	𖧄	𖧅	𖧆	𖧇	𖧈	𖧉	𖧊	𖧋	𖧌	𖧍	𖧎	𖧏
U+169Dx	𖧐	𖧑	𖧒	𖧓	𖧔	𖧕	𖧖	𖧗	𖧘	𖧙	𖧚	𖧛	𖧜	𖧝	𖧞	𖧟
U+169Ex	𖧠	𖧡	𖧢	𖧣	𖧤	𖧥	𖧦	𖧧	𖧨	𖧩	𖧪	𖧫	𖧬	𖧭	𖧮	𖧯
U+169Fx	𖧰	𖧱	𖧲	𖧳	𖧴	𖧵	𖧶	𖧷	𖧸	𖧹	𖧺	𖧻	𖧼	𖧽	𖧾	𖧿
U+16A0x	𖨀	𖨁	𖨂	𖨃	𖨄	𖨅	𖨆	𖨇	𖨈	𖨉	𖨊	𖨋	𖨌	𖨍	𖨎	𖨏
U+16A1x	𖨐	𖨑	𖨒	𖨓	𖨔	𖨕	𖨖	𖨗	𖨘	𖨙	𖨚	𖨛	𖨜	𖨝	𖨞	𖨟
U+16A2x	𖨠	𖨡	𖨢	𖨣	𖨤	𖨥	𖨦	𖨧	𖨨	𖨩	𖨪	𖨫	𖨬	𖨭	𖨮	𖨯
U+16A3x	𖨰	𖨱	𖨲	𖨳	𖨴	𖨵	𖨶	𖨷	𖨸							
Notes: 1. As of Unicode version 17.0; 2. Grey areas indicate non-assigned code points

== History ==
The following Unicode-related documents record the purpose and process of defining specific characters in the Bamum Supplement block:

Version	Final code points (Note: Proposed code points and characters names may differ from final code points and names)	Count	L2 ID	WG2 ID	Document
6.0	U+16800..16A38	569	L2/06-313		Riley, Charles (2006-09-21), Report on work with the Bamum script in Cameroon
6.0	U+16800..16A38	569	L2/07-023		Riley, Charles (2007-01-19), Towards the Encoding of the Bamum Script in the UCS
6.0	U+16800..16A38	569	L2/08-231	N3472	Everson, Michael; Riley, Chuck; Tuchscherer, Konrad (2008-06-01), Preliminary Proposal to encode the Old Bamum script in the SMP of the UCS
6.0	U+16800..16A38	569	L2/09-019	N3564	Everson, Michael; Riley, Charles; Tuchscherer, Konrad (2009-01-27), Proposal for encoding the Old Bamum script in the SMP of the UCS
6.0	U+16800..16A38	569	L2/09-102	N3597	Everson, Michael; Riley, Charles; Tuchscherer, Konrad (2009-03-28), Proposal for encoding additional Bamum characters
6.0	U+16800..16A38	569	L2/09-106	N3523	Everson, Michael (2009-03-28), Sources for the encoding of historical Bamum characters
6.0	U+16800..16A38	569	L2/09-234	N3603 (pdf, doc)	Umamaheswaran, V. S. (2009-07-08), "M54.09", Unconfirmed minutes of WG 2 meeting 54
6.0	U+16800..16A38	569	L2/09-104		Moore, Lisa (2009-05-20), "Consensus 119-C26", UTC #119 / L2 #216 Minutes
6.0	U+16800..16A38	569	L2/24-009R		Scherer, Markus; et al. (2024-01-19), "2.5 misspelled name of U+1680B: BAMUM LETTER PHASE-A MAEMBGBIEE", UTC #178 properties feedback & recommendations
6.0	U+16800..16A38	569	L2/24-006		Constable, Peter (2024-01-31), "Consensus 178-C7", UTC #178 Minutes, "Create a formal alias BAMUM LETTER PHASE-A MAEMGBIEE of type "correction" for U+1680B BAMUM LETTER PHASE-A MAEMBGBIEE"
6.0	U+16800..16A38	569	L2/25-091R		Kučera, Jan; et al. (2025-04-22), "3.9 Bamum Name Corrections (16.0 Beta Feedback) [Affects U+16881, 1688E, 168DC, and 1697D]", Recommendations to UTC #183 (April 2025) on Script Proposals
6.0	U+16800..16A38	569	L2/25-085		Leroy, Robin (2025-04-28), "Consensus 183-C23", UTC #183 Minutes, "Create [...] formal aliases of type "correction" [Affects U+16881, 1688E, 168DC, and 1697D]"
