= Nji Oumarou Nchare =

- Born: December 25, 1964 (age 61); Foumban, Cameroon
- Occupations: Director of Cultural Affairs, Bamum Palace and Co-Director, Bamum Scripts and Archives Project
- Writing career
- Genres: Language, Culture, History and Religion
- Subjects: Bamum language and Shümom language

Nji Oumarou Nchare (born December 25, 1964, in Foumban, Cameroon) is Co-Director of the Bamum Scripts and Archives Project in Foumban, Cameroon and Director of Cultural Affairs and Archivist at the Bamum Palace, Foumban. He is the founder (1978) of "Club Shümom" in Foumban, Director of the A-ka-u-ku and Shümom School Initiative, and hosts a regionally broadcast program on Radio Communautaire du Noun.

== Education ==
Nji Oumarou Nchare was raised in Cameroon, Africa, the son of Mbouombouo Moussa and Lipainpouo Amina. He attended Government Primary School, Njintout in Foumban, from 1970 until 1976, and earned his advanced studies degree from the Government High School in Foumban. It was during his primary studies in 1976 at Njintout when Oumarou first learned about the Bamum script and Sultan Ibrahim Njoya. Nchare was in Class 6 in primary school and the story of Sultan Ibrahim Njoya's inventions were told to him. He instantly became intrigued by the story of Njoya's inventions but his primary school instructor had no knowledge of the writing itself. Eventually Nchare studied the Bamum script under the tutelage of Emmanuel Ndayou Njoya, Nji Yerema Jean and André Njififen Kouendap and became involved in the Bamum Scripts and Archives Project.

Nchare continued to earn his advanced studies degrees from the University of Yaoundé, the Summer Institute of Linguistics at Yaoundé and the Regional School of Documentation in Brazzaville, Republic of Congo. He holds the first school leaving certificate, G.C.E ordinary level certificate, G.C.E advanced level certificate, the certificate of linguistic studies and the certificate of documentalist.

== Career and Life ==
Nchare is the Co-Director of the Bamum Scripts and Archives Project at the Archives du Palais des Rois Bamoun, Foumban. With the project's Co-Director, Konrad Tuchscherer, he has traveled the Bamum Kingdom collecting and photographing threatened documents, created a modern archives for the storage of documents, and helped to create a functional computer font for the Bamum script. He is involved with the translation and inventory of documents with a team of translators and has commenced an initiative to spread literacy among Bamum youth in schools. In 2006 the King of the Bamum people, El Hadj Sultan Ibrahim Mbombo Njoya, recognized Nchare for his efforts by awarding him the Bamum title “Nji” (“Master”). This recognition is among the highest titles in Bamum society, and once bestowed is passed down from generation to generation.

Today Nchare lives happily with his wife and five children in Cameroon.
