= Luc Sindjoun =

Luc Sindjoun (born 31 March 1964) is a professor of Political Science at University of Yaoundé, Cameroon and head of the Political Sciences Department since 2005.

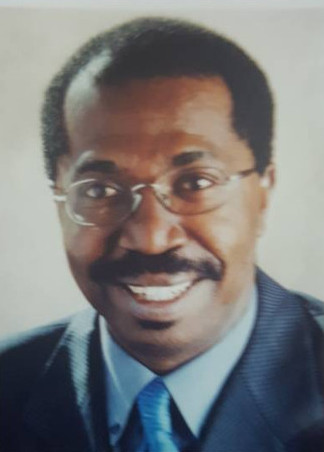
Sindjoun luc

== Biography ==
He is the first African scholar trained in African universities to be successful at the French competition for the promotion to the title of Agrégé de Science Politique (Professor tenured). Sindjoun has authored ten books and more than fifty articles in peer-reviewed political science journals. His fields of interests are comparative politics, international relations and epistemology of social sciences.

He was granted the golden medal of French-speaking universities in social sciences 2003/2004. He served as the President of the 2007 Jury of the pan-African competition for the promotion to the title of "Professeur Agrégé de Droit Public et de Science Politique" of African French-speaking universities (CAMES). In January 2008, he was elected as a member of the French Académie des Sciences d'Outre-Mer. Sindjoun has been a member of the Executive Committee of International Political Science Association (IPSA) since 2003, and he was the President of African Association of Political Science from 2001 to 2003. He was appointed as a special adviser to the President of Cameroon in July 2009.
