= Georgette D. Kanmogne =

Cameroonian American geneticist

- Born: Cameroon
- Education: University of Yaoundé; University of Bristol; University of Cambridge
- Known for: Mechanisms of blood brain barrier HIV infiltration
- Awards: 2012 Distinguished Scientist Award - University of Nebraska Medical Center, 2006 Nicolas Badami Fellowship Award for Excellence in HIV/AIDS Research, 2005 American Lung Association Career Investigator Award
- Scientific career
- Fields: Virology, genetics, neuroimmunology
- Workplaces: University of Nebraska Medical Center

Georgette D. Kanmogne is a Cameroonian American geneticist and molecular virologist and a full professor and vice chair for resource allocation and faculty development within the Department of Pharmacology and Experimental Neurosciences at the University of Nebraska Medical Center in Omaha, Nebraska. Kanmogne's research program focuses on exploring the pathogenesis of neuroAIDS by deciphering the mechanisms underlying blood brain barrier dysfunction and viral entry into the central nervous system. Her research also addresses the lack of HIV therapies that cross the blood brain barrier (BBB) and has played a critical role in the development of nanoparticles encapsulating HIV-drugs that can cross the BBB to prevent viral-mediated neuron death in the brain. Kanmogne collaborates with clinical and basic researchers across America, Cameroon, and West Africa, spanning disciplines from hematology to psychiatry, to explore how viral genetic diversity is correlated with the neurological impact of HIV.

== Early life and education ==
Kanmogne was born and raised in Cameroon. She was one of six children in her family and was the first of all of them to attend high school or college. In her adolescent years, Kanmogne was an altar server and sang in the youth choir at her parish. She contemplated becoming a nun throughout high school, though by the time she graduated, she had recognized her passion for science and had committed to pursuing an undergraduate degree at the University of Yaoundé in Cameroon.

Kanmogne completed her Bachelor of Science in Zoology in 1987, and then pursued her Master's of Science in biochemistry at the University of Yaoundé, completing her degree in 1989. For two years following her Master's, from 1990 to 1992, Kanmogne worked as a Laboratory Instructor in the Department of Biochemistry at the University of Yaoundé.

In 1992, Kanmogne moved to the United Kingdom to pursue her graduate training at the University of Bristol. She studied Molecular Parasitology under the mentorship of Wendy C. Gibson, exploring the biology of Trypanosoma brucei. Kanmogne used a novel genetic technique at the time, random amplification of polymorphic DNA (RAPD), to characterize the genetic heterogeneity of T. brucei gambiense isolates from endemic areas in Africa. Her work was the first to show that the RAPD method is as accurate as the RFLP method at characterizing genetic variation, while also achieving a more detailed genetic analysis. Kanmogne also explored more effective ways to diagnose sleeping sickness caused by T. brucei since its levels are very low. She developed a novel PCR method that was highly sensitive and could be used to effectively diagnose sleeping sickness at levels of 25 trypanosomes/ml of blood.

Kanmogne completed her graduate training in 1996, and stayed in the United Kingdom for her postdoctoral work at the University of Cambridge in the Department of Haematology. She began studying HIV during her postdoc, specifically exploring the CD4+ T-lymphocyte levels in patients with AIDS as well as the specific biology of human T-cell leukaemia virus type I infection in West African patients with AIDS.

In 1998, Kanmogne moved to the United States to pursue further postdoctoral training in the Department of Pathology at the University of Oklahoma Health Sciences Center. While continuing to study HIV, Kanmogne pursued a Master of Public Health in Biostatistics and Epidemiology at the University of Oklahoma Health Sciences Center from 2000 to 2002.

Under the mentorship of Ronald C. Kennedy, Kanmogne continued to study HIV, but now with an emphasis on the infiltration of HIV into the central nervous system and the lungs. Since the exact mechanisms of HIV invasion into the brain as well as subsequent neuronal cell death were unknown, Kanmogne's work explored the susceptibility of brain endothelial cells and cortical neurons to HIV-1 infection. She discovered that neither cell type expressed the known HIV receptors, CXCR4 and CCR5, and thus other cell types or mechanisms just mediate CNS-HIV infection. Kanmogne then explored using non-human primate (NHP) microglia to study HIV pathogenesis in the brain. She found that NHP microglia express HIV-1 receptors and can be used to study HIV pathogenesis.

In addition to studying HIV infection in the CNS, Kanmogne also explored HIV infection in the lung since the onset of AIDS is associated with severe pulmonary complications. She found that human lung microvascular endothelial cells are not a major reservoir of HIV in the lungs, but they do represent a target for the lethal effects of HIV viral proteins.

== Career and research ==
In 2002, Kanmogne was hired as a research assistant professor in the Department of Pathology at the University of Oklahoma Health Science Center. She continued to study the vascular biology of HIV infection and the effects of HIV infection on the central nervous system.

Kanmogne was then recruited to the University of Nebraska Medical Center in 2005 where she became an assistant professor in the Department of Pharmacology and Experimental Neuroscience, as well as a senior scientist in the Center for Neurovirology and Neurodegenerative Disorders. In 2008, she was promoted to associate professor and became the vice chair for resource allocation and faculty development within the Department of Pharmacology and Experimental Neuroscience. In 2012, Kanmogne received tenure and in 2015, she was promoted to full professor within the department. Kanmogne is a member of the American Society for Virology and the International Society for NeuroVirology.

At the University of Nebraska Medical Center, Kanmogne is also the principal investigator of a lab that explores the mechanisms of HIV-1 brain invasion and the vascular biology of HIV infection. Her work has led to critical discoveries about the role of blood brain barrier (BBB) interactions with HIV as well as how these interactions influence the immune response in the brain leading to neuroAIDS, including neurodegeneration and AIDS associated dementia. She has found that HIV affects the biology of the brain endothelium and that proximity of HIV-infected peripheral macrophages to the brain can lead to increased immune signalling, BBB facilitated infiltration of peripheral leukocytes into the brain. Kanmogne is also deeply committed to extensive collaboration and diversity in academia. She currently collaborates with several departments within the University of Yaoundé in Cameroon and the University of California San Diego, and her international research project explores the viral genetic diversity of HIV infections in Cameroon and West Africa. She hopes that her projects will enhance the ability of healthcare workers in Cameroon and West Africa to better diagnose and treat HIV. Further, since Cameroon has some of the highest diversity of HIV strains and subtypes, her work exploring the genetic variants of HIV in relation to neurological symptoms will help to highlight potential disease trajectories associated with each subtype as well as open up possibilities for novel therapeutic development.

=== HIV infected monocytes and blood brain barrier dysfunction ===
Kanmogne and her colleagues discovered that the HIV-1 envelope glycoprotein, gp120, activates the CCR5 and CXCR4 receptors on the surface of human brain microvasculature endothelial cells (HBMECs) leading to toxicity and BBB leakage. They further showed that blocking gp120 or its associated receptors actually prevents monocyte migration and permeability of the BBB via the PKC pathway. Kanmogne and her colleagues later found that HIV-1 causes STAT-1 activation in HBMECs leading to IL-6 expression which mediates the recruitment of monocytes across the BBB. To further delineate the mechanisms of HIV-infection leading to neuroinflammation, Kanmogne and her colleagues found that the CCR5 chemokine receptor mediated HIV-1 binding to HBMECs and that cross talk between STAT1 and PI3K pathways were mediating the BBB dysfunction after HIV infection.

=== Cognitive impairments due to HIV ===
Kanmogne and her colleagues also hoped to explore the cognitive impairments due to HIV infection in Sub-Saharan Africa, so developed novel methods to do so. The team reported the first normative data for executive function and verbal fluency in Cameroonians and this established the ability to use this method for future assessments of cognitive function in patients with and without HIV infection. They further conducted a cross-sectional study of the HIV-associated neurocognitive disorders (HAND) using the International HIV Dementia Scale among a population in Cameroon. They found that the risk factors for HAND are similar to those described in other studies, underscoring the need to start to assess risk factors as a means of HANDS prevention in Cameroon.

=== Nanomedicines for HIV ===
In order to treat the neurocognitive symptoms of HIV, therapeutics must enter the brain so Kanmogne and her team are developing novel nanomedicines to achieve this. The first developed a nanoformulated crystalline antiretroviral therapy in 2012 which allows for drugs to be passed through the BBB through cell-to-cell contact between monocytes and HBMECs. They found that the therapy in mice led to decreased activation of glial cells and decreased viral load in the spleen. Next, they developed a method in 2018 that uses polyanhydride nanoparticles containing antioxidants that are internalized and then transferred from monocytes to HBMECs in order to protect neurons from oxidative stress associated with infection and inflammation. This therapy showed positive results in its potential to be used as a method to enhance drug transport across the BBB.

== Awards and honors ==
- 2012 Distinguished Scientist Award - University of Nebraska Medical Center
- 2006 Nicolas Badami Fellowship Award for Excellence in HIV/AIDS Research
- 2005 American Lung Association Career Investigator Award
- 2003 Pfizer Atorvastatin Research Awards
- 2000 Oklahoma Center for Neuroscience Travel Award
- 1995 Travel Award - British Society of Parasitology
- 1995 Travel Grant - University of Bristol Alumni Foundation
- 1992-1996 World Health Organization (WHO) Research Training Grant
