= Bamum (Unicode block) =

- Range: U+A6A0..U+A6FF (96 code points)
- Plane: BMP
- Scripts: Bamum
- Major alphabets: Bamum
- Assigned: 88 code points
- Unused: 8 reserved code points

Unicode version history
- 5.2 (2009): 88 (+88)

Unicode documentation
- Code chart ∣ Web page

Bamum is a Unicode block containing the characters of stage-G Bamum script, used for modern writing of the Bamum language of western Cameroon. Characters for writing earlier orthographies (stages A–F) are contained in a Bamum Supplement block.

Bamum^{[1]}^{[2]} Official Unicode Consortium code chart (PDF)
	0	1	2	3	4	5	6	7	8	9	A	B	C	D	E	F
U+A6Ax	ꚠ	ꚡ	ꚢ	ꚣ	ꚤ	ꚥ	ꚦ	ꚧ	ꚨ	ꚩ	ꚪ	ꚫ	ꚬ	ꚭ	ꚮ	ꚯ
U+A6Bx	ꚰ	ꚱ	ꚲ	ꚳ	ꚴ	ꚵ	ꚶ	ꚷ	ꚸ	ꚹ	ꚺ	ꚻ	ꚼ	ꚽ	ꚾ	ꚿ
U+A6Cx	ꛀ	ꛁ	ꛂ	ꛃ	ꛄ	ꛅ	ꛆ	ꛇ	ꛈ	ꛉ	ꛊ	ꛋ	ꛌ	ꛍ	ꛎ	ꛏ
U+A6Dx	ꛐ	ꛑ	ꛒ	ꛓ	ꛔ	ꛕ	ꛖ	ꛗ	ꛘ	ꛙ	ꛚ	ꛛ	ꛜ	ꛝ	ꛞ	ꛟ
U+A6Ex	ꛠ	ꛡ	ꛢ	ꛣ	ꛤ	ꛥ	ꛦ	ꛧ	ꛨ	ꛩ	ꛪ	ꛫ	ꛬ	ꛭ	ꛮ	ꛯ
U+A6Fx	꛰	꛱	꛲	꛳	꛴	꛵	꛶	꛷								
Notes: 1. As of Unicode version 16.0; 2. Grey areas indicate non-assigned code points

== History ==
The following Unicode-related documents record the purpose and process of defining specific characters in the Bamum block:

Version	Final code points (Note: Proposed code points and characters names may differ from final code points and names)	Count	L2 ID	WG2 ID	Document
5.2	U+A6A0..A6F7	88	L2/06-313		Riley, Charles (2006-09-21), Report on work with the Bamum script in Cameroon
5.2	U+A6A0..A6F7	88	L2/07-023		Riley, Charles (2007-01-19), Towards the Encoding of the Bamum Script in the UCS
5.2	U+A6A0..A6F7	88	L2/07-015		Moore, Lisa (2007-02-08), "Bamum (C.8)", UTC #110 Minutes
5.2	U+A6A0..A6F7	88	L2/07-105	N3213	Freytag, Asmus (2007-02-23), Proposed block allocation Cyrillic / Bamum
5.2	U+A6A0..A6F7	88	L2/07-024R	N3209R	Everson, Michael; Riley, Charles (2007-03-21), Preliminary proposal for encoding the Bamum script in the BMP
5.2	U+A6A0..A6F7	88		N3353 (pdf, doc)	Umamaheswaran, V. S. (2007-10-10), "M51.5", Unconfirmed minutes of WG 2 meeting 51 Hanzhou, China; 2007-04-24/27
5.2	U+A6A0..A6F7	88	L2/07-118R2		Moore, Lisa (2007-05-23), "111-C17", UTC #111 Minutes
5.2	U+A6A0..A6F7	88	L2/07-268	N3253 (pdf, doc)	Umamaheswaran, V. S. (2007-07-26), "M50.32", Unconfirmed minutes of WG 2 meeting 50, Frankfurt-am-Main, Germany; 2007-04-24/27
5.2	U+A6A0..A6F7	88	L2/07-239	N3298	Anderson, Deborah (2007-07-30), Request to Remove Bamum from Amendment 5
5.2	U+A6A0..A6F7	88	L2/07-225		Moore, Lisa (2007-08-21), "C.18", UTC #112 Minutes
5.2	U+A6A0..A6F7	88	L2/08-350	N3522	Everson, Michael; Riley, Charles; Tuchscherer, Konrad (2008-10-14), Proposal to encode modern Bamum in the BMP
5.2	U+A6A0..A6F7	88	L2/08-412	N3553 (pdf, doc)	Umamaheswaran, V. S. (2008-11-05), "M53.15", Unconfirmed minutes of WG 2 meeting 53
