= Mahamat Paba Salé =

Cameroonian diplomat (born 1950)

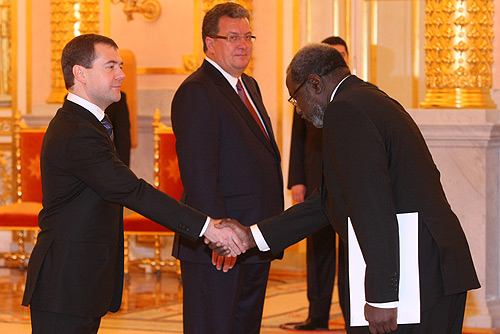
Mahamat Paba Salé (right) presents his credentials as Ambassador to Russian President Dmitry Medvedev, 16 January 2009.

Mahamat Paba Salé (born 1950) is a Cameroonian diplomat who has been Cameroon's Ambassador to Russia since January 2009.

== Background and education ==
Born in Kousséri, Paba Salé received his primary education there from 1956 to 1963 before attending secondary school in Garoua from June 1963 to March 1970. Subsequently, he attended the University of Yaoundé, where he studied geography, from October 1970 to October 1974.

== Administrative and diplomatic career ==
In November 1981, Paba Salé was appointed as a Research Officer (Chargé d'études) at the Delegation-General for Scientific and Technical Research, while he also taught at the University of Yaoundé. Later, he briefly worked as a Technical Adviser at the Ministry of Higher Education and Scientific Research from May 1984 until he was appointed to the government as Minister-Delegate to the Minister of Foreign Affairs on 7 July 1984.

Paba Salé served for about two years in the government. Subsequently, he was Ambassador to Morocco, eventually becoming the longest-serving African ambassador to Morocco. He remained at his post in Morocco until 2008.

Following the death of André Ngongang Ouandji, Cameroon's Ambassador to Russia, on 27 June 2007, President Paul Biya appointed Paba Salé to replace him on 19 February 2008. He presented his credentials to Russian President Dmitry Medvedev almost a year later, on 16 January 2009.
