= Muntu Valdo =

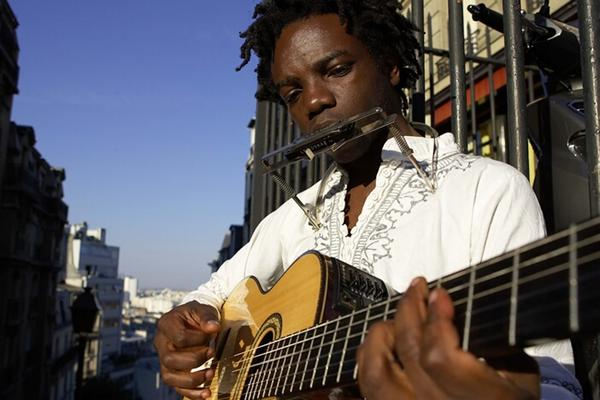

Background information
- Born: 1972 (age 53–54); Douala, Cameroon
- Genres: blues, world, jazz, soul, folk, acoustic
- Occupation: Musician
- Instruments: Guitar, harmonica, vocals, percussions
- Years active: 1995
- Labels: Sawablues, Warner Jazz
- Website: muntuvaldo.co.uk

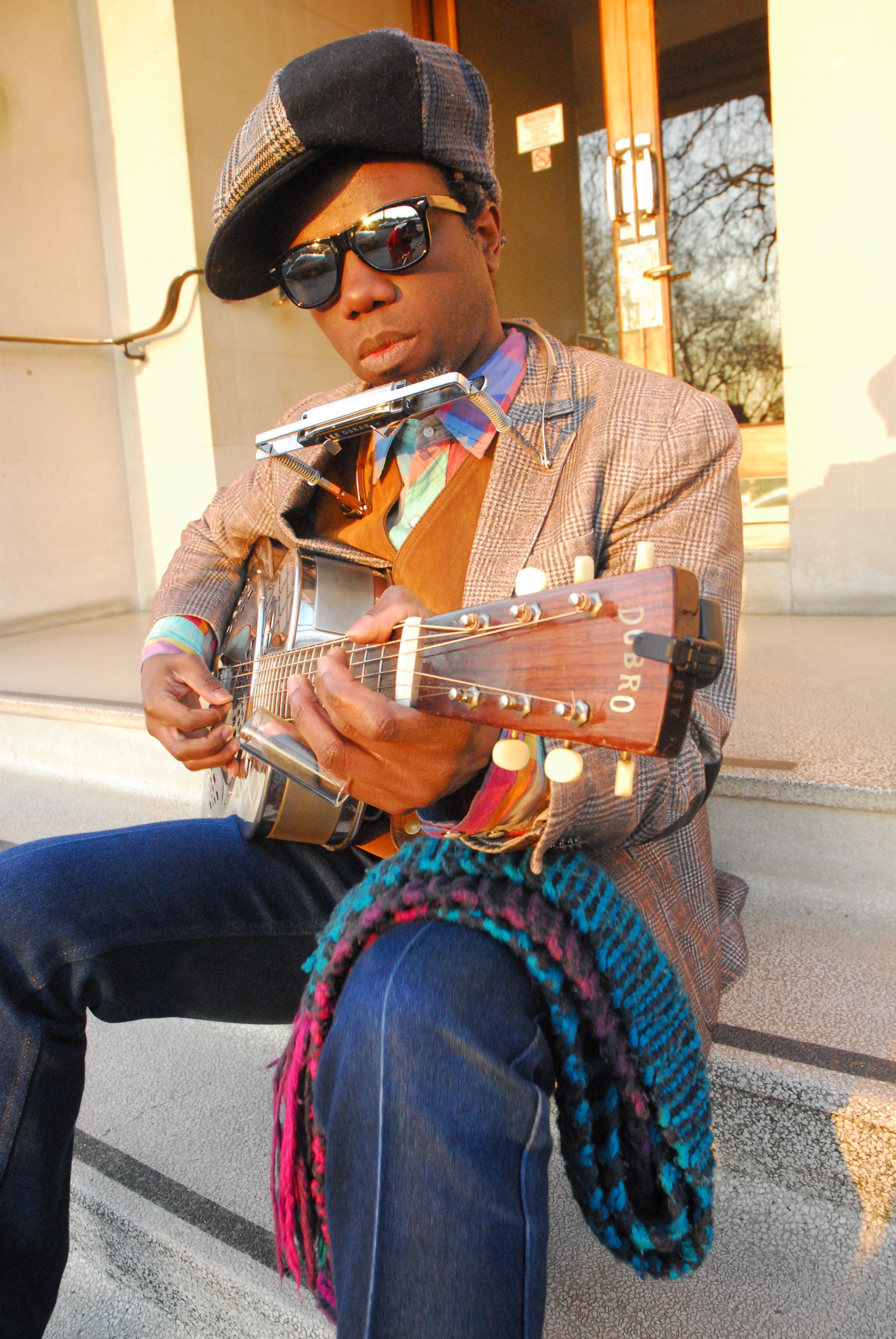

Muntu Valdo (born 1972) is an [acoustic blues] guitarist, harmonica player, and singer from Douala, Cameroon. He has performed with Ali Farka Toure, Manu Dibango, Richard Bona, Lokua Kanza, Eko Roosevelt, Lionel & Stephane Belmondo, Keziah Jones, and Alpha Blondy, and has played at Womad music festivals.

== Childhood and education ==
Valdo, the eldest of four brothers, is from the Sawa community of Cameroon on the Gulf of Guinea coast; his father from the small village of Dibombari near Douala, and his mother from the Malimba Islands. When 8 years old he began playing on a guitar made from plasterboard and fishing wire, and at 15, started writing music, developing a particular musical style called Sawa Blues.

In the early 1990s, Valdo studied Law at the University of Yaoundé. While at university, he was injured and bed-ridden during student demonstrations; part of a political upheaval in Cameroon. On leaving hospital he returned to his parents in Douala, where he occasionally offered tuition to children. His parents had forbidden him to return to Yaoundé, so he began university studies at Douala in Linguistics and History, particularly that of Africa and Ancient Egypt. These studies influenced his decision to pursue a musical career, as did the musician Eko Roosevelt who, with Valdo, performed with the university's orchestra. He later joined Roosevelt's band as a guitarist; this was Valdo's first experience as a professional musician.

== Career ==
After three years Eko Roosevelt's band, Valdo formed Muntu Band, later renamed Mulema ("the heart"), and began recording and performing. In 2000, he performed in ten Cameroon cities. The same year, sound engineer Gilbert Moodio played a recording of a Valdo concert to a French producer; after an audition, Valdo was encouraged to move to France. He lived in Belleville, associated with young musicians, and played in jam sessions and concerts in the bars of Rue Oberkampf and Place Chatelet, either solo or with his band. He also played with Manu Dibango, Alpha Blondy, Ali Farka Touré, Lokua Kanza, Cheick Tidianne Seck, Tony Allen, Rido Bayonne, Etienne Mbappe, Stephane & Lionel Belmondo, and Richard Bona.

Muntu released his first album Gods and Devils – Moiye Na Muititi in 2005. He toured Africa, Europe and Asia, playing festivals and concert halls including the Queen Elizabeth Hall (London), New Morning (Paris), Womad (Carceres, Charlton Park and Singapore), the Théâtre de la Petite Reine (Tbilisi), The Sage (Newcastle), Festival Plein Sud & Festival Africolor (France), and Fespam (Republic of the Congo).

In January 2008, prince of SawaBlues, change country again and chose London. He was attracted by the city’s dynamic cultural scene which he found perfect for cultivating fresh ideas and new material.

In London, Muntu soon started working with live music producers Serious Ltd. Performances followed at some of the UKs largest festivals (Womad, London Jazz Festival, Africa Express, Musicport, Belfast International Festival, Africa Oye, to name a few) and venues (Royal Opera House, Barbican, The Sage Gateshead, Bridgewater Hall, Birmingham Symphony Hall, to name a few) playing alongside a huge variety of musicians including Richard Bona, Chucho Valdez, Naturally 7, Raul Midon, Staff Benda Bilili, Lionel Loueke, Ben L’oncle Soul, Nneka, Lucinda Williams, Manu Dibango, Denis Rollings and Alasdair Roberts.

In 2011 Warner Jazz released his second album, The One The Many. During the release period he toured extensively across the UK including supporting Lady Smith Black Mambazo on their 30-date UK tour and embarking on my own tour supported by Arts Council’s Black Routes programme.

In 2012 he was commissioned to produce a live performance bringing together musicians from across Central and West Africa to be presented during Festival 2012’s BT River of Music for the Olympic games. The concert was a huge success and saw musicians from 12 different countries performing for the very first time in the UK. The likes of Annie-Flore Batchielilis, Mounira Mitchala, Lulendo, Acimo, Corry Denguemo and Amen Viana all proudly came together to perform alongside the Maria Fidelis Choir in a one-off extravaganza that also resulted in the release of thesingle ‘5 circles of Humanity’.

In 2013 he had the privilege and the honour to close the London African Festival with his 5-piece band. In November of the same year he supported Manu Dibango at the Barbican in London to celebrate his 50 years musical career, before heading to Cameroon as the headline act of Quartier Sud Festival.

From 2013 to 2015 I worked on various projects including studio sessions as instrumentalist and producer for different artists like Bumi Thomas, Sherry Davis, writing for a musical as well as performing on stages all over the Uk and countries in the world.

In 2016 he was invited by 2seas Session and the Heir to the Bahrain Kingdom, Prince Abdellah to perform in the Kingdom Compound and in the studio once owned by Michael Jackson near the capital city of Manama.

In 2017 he toured six cities across Europe with Google for Enterprise during the Pitch-Drive fund raising campaign.

From 2018 he started working on the production of a new Album entitled Sawablues as well as starting the writing a book about the so called Bantu People; a book that took him almost 10 years of research.

In 2019 he founded Cultural Laboratoire, a weekly gathering of artists from different fields of activities including dance, painting, poetry and music, at Katakata in Brixton, one of the most ethnically diverse areas of London in UK.

In 2022, he went on road again, performing at nearly 60 concerts including a week of concerts and workshops at Dakar Music Expo in Senegal and supporting act for Ladysmith Black Mambazo on their 2022 UK tour.

== Discography ==
- 2005: Gods and Devils
- 2011: The One and The Many
