= University of Yaoundé =

University in Cameroon

- Université de Yaoundé
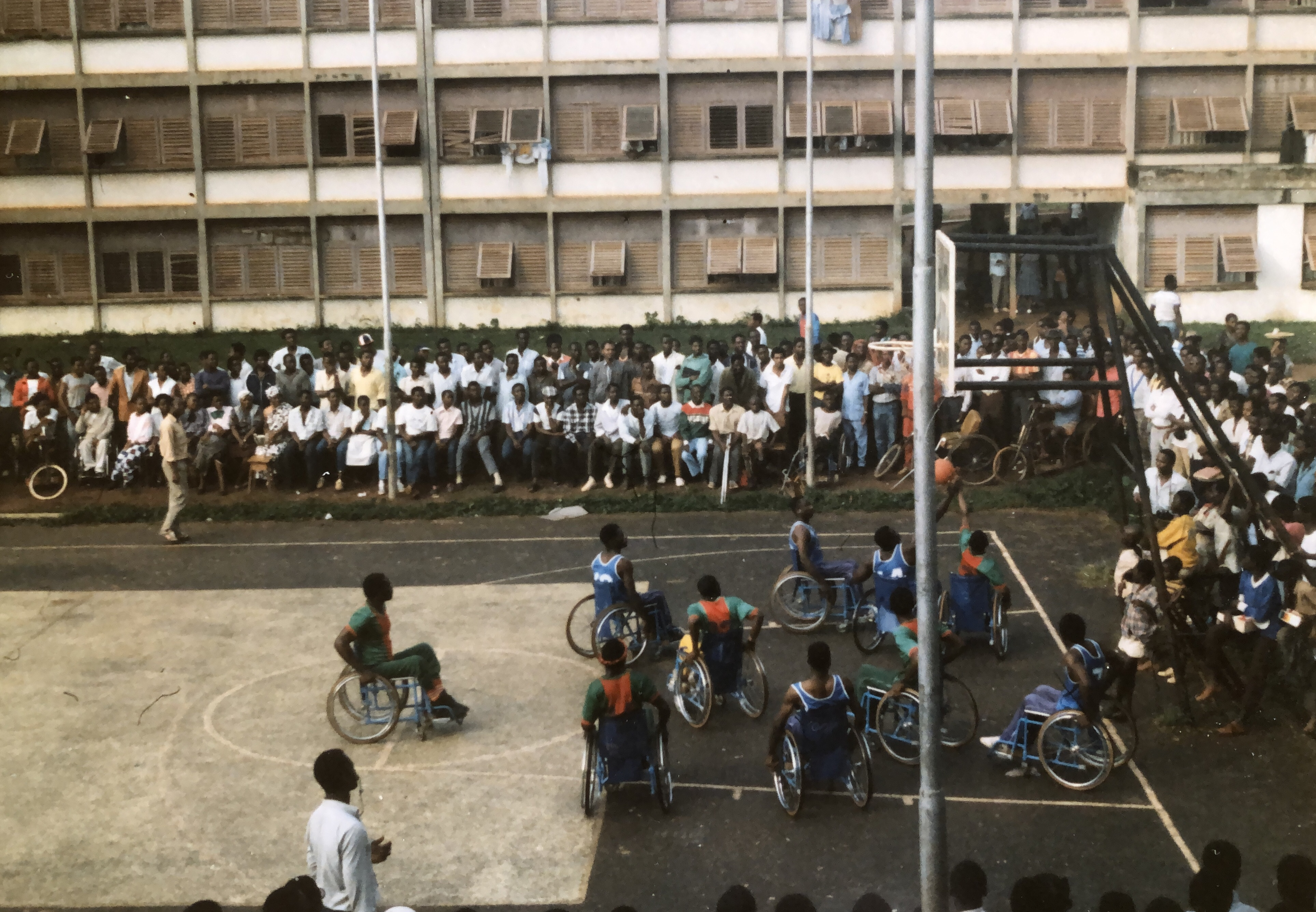
- University of Yaoundé, 1988
- Former name: Federal University of Yaoundé (1962–1973)
- Type: Public
- Active: 26 July 1962–1993
- Location: Yaounde, Centre, Cameroon
- Campus: Ngoa-Ekelle, Soa and others
- Language: French, English

The University of Yaoundé (French: Université de Yaoundé) was a university in Cameroon, located in Yaoundé, the country's capital. In 1993, following a university reform, it was split into two universities: University of Yaoundé I and University of Yaoundé II.

== History ==
It was built with the help of France and opened in 1962 as the Federal University of Yaoundé, dropping the "Federal" in 1972 when the country was reorganized.

In 1993 following a university reform the University of Yaounde was split into two (University of Yaoundé I and University of Yaoundé II) following the university branch-model pioneered by the University of Paris.

== Notable alumni ==
- Simon Achidi Achu
- Henri Eyebe Ayissi
- Jean-Marc Ela
- Ndumbe Eyoh
- Christopher Fomunyoh
- Georgette D. Kanmogne
- Joseph Mfonyam
- Michel Tommo Monthé
- Nji Oumarou Nchare
- Kristo Numpuby
- Mahamat Paba Salé
- Faustin-Archange Touadéra
- Muntu Valdo
- Philémon Yang
- Norbert Zongo
- Missy BK

== Notable faculty ==
- Marie-Thérèse Assiga Ahanda
- Laurent Esso
- Pierre Hélé
- Elie Mbonda
- Elvis Ngolle Ngolle
- Adamou Ndam Njoya
- Henri Hogbe Nlend
- Luc Sindjoun
- Maurice Tadadjeu
