= Eyob =

Eyob is a personal name of Ethiopian and Eritrean origin. It is the Geʽez (an ancient Ethiopic language) translation of Job from the Bible. Notable people with the name include:

- Eyob Faniel (born 1992), Eritrean-born Italian long-distance runner
- Eyob Mekonnen (1975–2013), Ethiopian reggae singer
- Eyob Zambataro (born 1998), Italian football player of Ethiopian origin
