= Ndumbe Eyoh =

Cameroonian theatre director

- Born: November 11, 1949
- Died: September 7, 2006 (aged 56)
- Occupations: Theatrical director; Playwright; Theatre critic; University teacher

Hansel Ndumbe Eyoh (November 11, 1949 – September 7, 2006) was a Cameroonian theatre director, critic, and playwright, and professor of Theatre Arts at the University of Yaoundé I.

== Biography ==
Ndumbe Eyoh was born in Kurume, Southwest Province. He attended primary school in Kumba and continued to St Joseph's College Sasse in 1963 as part of the jubilee class. He obtained his G.C.E. Ordinary Level there. Two years of homeschooling later, he received his G.C.E. Advanced Level. In 1970, he enrolled in the University of Yaoundé, where he studied English at the undergraduate level. From 1973, he spent a couple of years at the School of Drama at Leeds University in England, and graduated with a PhD. in 1979. He died in Yaoundé leaving behind a Widow and 5 children. Dibo Bedie Ndumbe-Eyoh, Fese Munyenge Ndumbe-Eyoh, Sume Ndumbe-Eyoh, Mulango Ndumbe-Eyoh, Makia Ndumbe-Eyoh.

== Published works ==
- World Encyclopedia of Contemporary Theatre: Africa (1997) by Ousmane Diakhate (Editor), Hansel Ndumbe Eyoh (Editor)
- Munyenge (1989). Children's Play. Performed at the First World Festival of Children's Theatre in Lingen, Germany
- The Magic Fruit (1991)
- From Hammock to Bridges
