= Konrad Tuchscherer =

American academic

- Born: February 16, 1970 (age 56); Neenah, Wisconsin, United States
- Occupation: Professor
- Writing career
- Genres: African Studies, African History, African Languages
- Subject: Writing systems of Africa

Konrad Tuchscherer (born February 16, 1970, in Neenah, Wisconsin) is an educator, scholar, writer, and public intellectual. He specializes in the history and the languages of Africa. Tuchscherer currently serves as the co-director of the Bamum Scripts and Archives Project in Cameroon and is associate professor of history and director of Africana studies at St. John's University (New York City).

== Education and career ==
Tuchscherer is associate professor of history and director of Africana studies at St. John's University (New York City). He received his Ph.D. from the School of Oriental and African Studies at the University of London, where he was a Marshall Scholar and Fulbright Scholar, and wrote a thesis on West African scripts. He attended the University of Wisconsin–Madison.

Tuchscherer is the co-director of the Bamum Scripts and Archives Project at the Archives du Palais des Rois Bamoun, Foumban. He has traveled the Bamum Kingdom collecting and photographing threatened documents, created a modern archives for the storage of documents, and helped to create a functional computer font for the Bamum script. He continues to translate and inventory documents with a team of translators and has commenced an initiative to spread literacy among Bamum youth in schools. In 2006 the king of the Bamum, El Hadj Sultan Ibrahim Mbombo Njoya, recognized him for his efforts by awarding him the Bamum title "Nji" ("Master"). His work on Bamum began as a Fulbright Scholar in 2004. In 2006, Tuchscherer lived and conducted research in Foumban for the year.

Tuchscherer's interests include nineteenth- and twentieth-century West Africa, colonialism in Africa, and Gullah history in South Carolina and Georgia. His important research on the origin, development and spread of writing in Africa has appeared in several leading journals: the Bagam script of Cameroon in African Affairs, the Vai script of Liberia in History in Africa, the Mende script of Sierra Leone in African Languages and Cultures and Journal of African Cultural Studies and Egyptian hieroglyphs in Africana Bulletin. As of 2007, Tuchscherer was writing a book entitled Black Scribes that explores the history of the written word in Africa from ancient Egyptian hieroglyphs to modern West African alphabets.
