= Bamum script =

Set of scripts for the Bamum language of Cameroon

Bamum
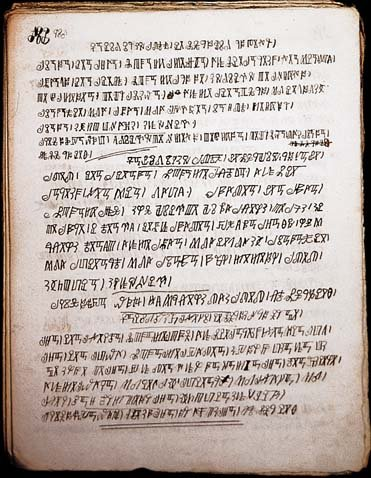
- A book in the sixth Bamum script, c. 1910
- Script type: Pictographic (historically), syllabary
- Period: c. 1896, moribund c. 1931, revived c. 2007
- Direction: Left-to-right
- Languages: Bamum

Related scripts
- Child systems: Bagam?

ISO 15924
- ISO 15924: Bamu (435), Bamum

Unicode
- Unicode alias: Bamum
- Unicode range: U+A6A0–U+A6FF Bamum; U+16800–U+16A3F Bamum Supplement

The Bamum scripts are an evolutionary series of six scripts created for the Bamum language by Ibrahim Njoya, King of Bamum (now western Cameroon). They are notable for evolving from a pictographic system to a semi-syllabary in the space of fourteen years, from 1896 to 1910. Bamum type was cast in 1918, but the script fell into disuse around 1931. A project began around 2007 to revive the Bamum script.

The Bamum script is also used to write the Shümom language, also invented by Njoya.

== History ==
In its initial form, Bamum script was a pictographic mnemonic aid (proto-writing) of 500 to 600 characters. As Njoya revised the script, he introduced logograms (word symbols). The sixth version, completed by 1910, is a syllabary with 80 characters. It is also called a-ka-u-ku after its first four characters. The version in use by 1906 was called mbima.

The script was further refined in 1918, when Njoya had copper sorts cast for printing. The script fell into disuse in 1931 with the exile of Njoya to Yaoundé, Cameroon.

At present, Bamum script is not in any significant use. However, the Bamum Scripts and Archives Project is attempting to modernize and revive the script. The project is based in the old Bamum capital of Foumban.

=== Phase A ===
The initial form of Bamum script, called Lewa ("book"), was developed in 1896–1897. It consisted of 465 pictograms (511 according to some sources) and 10 characters for the digits 1–10. The writing direction could be top-to-bottom, left-to-right, or bottom-to-top. (Right-to-left was avoided because that was the direction of the Arabic script used by the neighboring Hausa people.)

=== Phase B ===
The second system, called Mbima ("mixed"), was developed in 1899–1900. It was a simplification of the first; Njoya omitted 72 characters but added 45 new ones. The writing direction was left-to-right in this and all subsequent phases.

=== Phase C ===
The third system, called Nyi Nyi Nfa' after its first three characters, was developed around 1902. This simplification omitted 56 characters, leaving 371 and 10 digits. Njoya used this system to write his History of the Bamun People and in correspondence with his mother.

=== Phase D ===
The fourth system, called Rii Nyi Nsha Mfw' after its first four characters, was developed around 1907–1908. It has 285 characters and 10 digits and is a further simplification of the previous version.

=== Phase E ===
The fifth system, called Rii Nyi Mfw' Men, was also developed around 1907–1908. It has 195 characters and 10 digits and was used for a Bible translation. These first five systems are closely related: All were progressively simplified pictographic protowriting with logographic elements.

=== Phase F ===
The sixth system, called A Ka U Ku after its first four characters, was developed around 1910. It has 82 characters and 10 digits. This phase marks a shift to a full syllabic writing system able to distinguish 160 syllables. It was used to record births, marriages, deaths, and court rulings.

=== Phase G ===
The seventh and final system, called Mfemfe ("new") or A Ka U Ku Mfemfe, was developed around 1918. It has only 80 characters, ten of which double as both syllables and digits. Like the previous system, missing syllables are written using combinations of similar syllables plus the desired vowel, or with a diacritic.

== Description ==
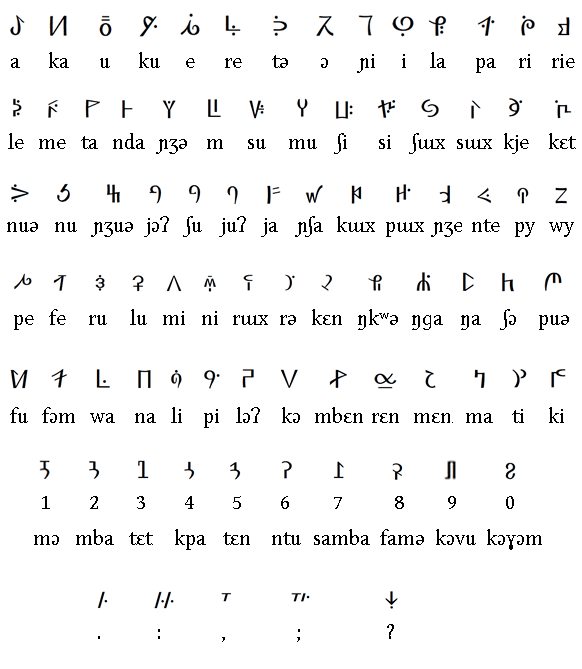
The Bamum syllabary, less diacritics, digraphs, and the nʒɛmli

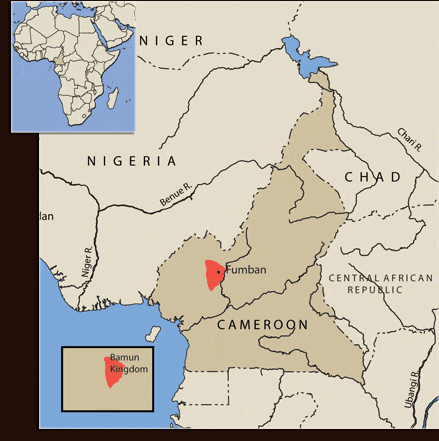
Map of the Kingdom of Bamun in present-day Cameroon

The 80 glyphs of modern Bamum are not enough to represent all of the consonant-vowel syllables (C V syllables) of the language. This deficiency is made up for with a diacritic or by combining glyphs having CV_{1} and V_{2} values, for CV_{2}. This makes the script alphabetic for syllables not directly covered by the syllabary. Adding the inherent vowel of the syllable voices a consonant: tu + u = /du/, fu + u = /vu/, ju + u = /ʒu/, ja + a = /ʒa/, ʃi + i = /ʒi/, puə + u = /bu/.

The two diacritics are a circumflex (ko'ndon) that may be added to any of the 80 glyphs, and a macron (tukwentis) that is restricted to a dozen. The circumflex generally has the effect of adding a glottal stop to the syllable, for instance kâ is read /kaʔ/, though the vowel is shortened and any final consonant is dropped in the process, as in pûə /puʔ/ and kɛ̂t /kɛʔ/. Prenasalization is also lost: ɲʃâ /ʃaʔ/, ntê /teʔ/, ntûu /tuʔ/. Sometimes, however, the circumflex nasalizes the vowel: nî /nɛn/, pî /pin/, rê /rɛn/, jûʔ /jun/, mɔ̂ /mɔn/, ɲʒûə /jun/ (loss of NC as with glottal stop). Others are idiosyncratic: ɲʒə̂m /jəm/ (simple loss of NC), tə̂ /tɔʔ/ (vowel change), ɲî /ɲe/, riê /z/, m̂ /n/, ʃɯ̂x /jɯx/, nûə /ŋuə/, kɯ̂x /ɣɯ/, rə̂ /rɔ/, ŋkwə̂n /ŋuət/, fɔ̂m /mvɔp/, mbɛ̂n /pɛn/, tî /tɯ/, kpâ /ŋma/, vŷ /fy/, ɣɔ̂m /ŋɡɔm/.

The macron is a 'killer stroke' that deletes the vowel from a syllable and so forms consonants and NC clusters (/nd, ŋɡ/) that can be used for syllable codas. Consonantal /n/ is used both as a coda and to prenasalize an initial consonant. The two irregularities with the macron are ɲʒūə, read as /j/, and ɔ̄, read as /ə/.

The script has distinctive punctuation, including a 'capitalization' mark (nʒɛmli), visually similar to an inverted question mark, for proper names, and a decimal system of ten digits; the old glyph for ten has been refashioned as a zero.

== Modern syllabary (phase G) ==
Bamum syllabary (diacritics in gray)
ꚠ	ꚡ	ꚢ	ꚣ	ꚤ	ꚥ	ꚦ	ꚧ	ꚨ	ꚩ	ꚪ	ꚫ	ꚬ	ꚭ	ꚮ	ꚯ
a	ka	u	ku	e	re	tə	ɔ	nyi	i	la	pa	rii	rie	lee	mee
ꚠ꛰	ꚡ꛰	ꚢ꛰	ꚣ꛰	ꚤ꛰	ꚥ꛰	ꚦ꛰	ꚧ꛰	ꚨ꛰	ꚩ꛰	ꚪ꛰	ꚫ꛰	ꚬ꛰	ꚭ꛰	ꚮ꛰	ꚯ꛰
aʔ	kaʔ	wuʔ	kuʔ	eʔ	rɛn	tɔʔ	ɔʔ	nye	iʔ	laʔ	paʔ	riʔ	z	leʔ	meʔ
							ꚧ꛱								
ə
ꚰ	ꚱ	ꚲ	ꚳ	ꚴ	ꚵ	ꚶ	ꚷ	ꚸ	ꚹ	ꚺ	ꚻ	ꚼ	ꚽ	ꚾ	ꚿ
taa	ndaa	nʒəm	m	suu	mu	ʃii	si	ʃɯx	sɯx	kye	kɛt	nuə	nu	nʒuə	yɔʔ
ꚰ꛰	ꚱ꛰	ꚲ꛰	ꚳ꛰	ꚴ꛰	ꚵ꛰	ꚶ꛰	ꚷ꛰	ꚸ꛰	ꚹ꛰	ꚺ꛰	ꚻ꛰	ꚼ꛰	ꚽ꛰	ꚾ꛰	ꚿ꛰
taʔ	ndaʔ	yəm	n	suʔ	muʔ	ʃiʔ	siʔ	yɯx	sɯʔ	kyeʔ	keʔ	ŋuə	nuʔ	yuən	yɔʔ
	ꚱ꛱					ꚶ꛱	ꚷ꛱							ꚾ꛱	
	nd					ʃ	s							y	
ꛀ	ꛁ	ꛂ	ꛃ	ꛄ	ꛅ	ꛆ	ꛇ	ꛈ	ꛉ	ꛊ	ꛋ	ꛌ	ꛍ	ꛎ	ꛏ
ʃu	yu	ya	nʃa	kɯx	pɯx	nʒe	nte	pü	wü	pe	fe	ru	lu	mi	ni
ꛀ꛰	ꛁ꛰	ꛂ꛰	ꛃ꛰	ꛄ꛰	ꛅ꛰	ꛆ꛰	ꛇ꛰	ꛈ꛰	ꛉ꛰	ꛊ꛰	ꛋ꛰	ꛌ꛰	ꛍ꛰	ꛎ꛰	ꛏ꛰
ʃuʔ	yun	yaʔ	ʃaʔ	ɣɯ	pɯʔ	nʒeʔ	teʔ	püʔ	üʔ	peʔ	feʔ	ruʔ	luʔ	miʔ	nɛn
ꛐ	ꛑ	ꛒ	ꛓ	ꛔ	ꛕ	ꛖ	ꛗ	ꛘ	ꛙ	ꛚ	ꛛ	ꛜ	ꛝ	ꛞ	ꛟ
rɯx	rə	kɛn	ŋkwən	ŋga	ŋa	ʃɔ	puə	fu	fɔm	wa	na	li	pi	lɔʔ	kɔ
ꛐ꛰	ꛑ꛰	ꛒ꛰	ꛓ꛰	ꛔ꛰	ꛕ꛰	ꛖ꛰	ꛗ꛰	ꛘ꛰	ꛙ꛰	ꛚ꛰	ꛛ꛰	ꛜ꛰	ꛝ꛰	ꛞ꛰	ꛟ꛰
rɯʔ	rɔ	kɛn	ŋuət	ŋgaʔ	ŋaʔ	ʃɔʔ	puʔ	fuʔ	mvɔp	waʔ	naʔ	liʔ	pin	lɔʔ	kɔʔ
				ꛔ꛱		ꛖ꛱		ꛘ꛱			ꛛ꛱	ꛜ꛱			ꛟ꛱
				ŋg		ʃ		f			n	l			k
ꛠ	ꛡ	ꛢ	ꛣ	ꛤ	ꛥ	ꛦ	ꛧ	ꛨ	ꛩ	ꛪ	ꛫ	ꛬ	ꛭ	ꛮ	ꛯ
mbɛn	rɛn	mɛn	ma	ti	ki	mɔ 1	mbaa 2	tɛt 3	kpa 4	tɛn 5	ntuu 6	sa 7	faa 8	vü 9	ɣɔm 0
ꛠ꛰	ꛡ꛰	ꛢ꛰	ꛣ꛰	ꛤ꛰	ꛥ꛰	ꛦ꛰	ꛧ꛰	ꛨ꛰	ꛩ꛰	ꛪ꛰	ꛫ꛰	ꛬ꛰	ꛭ꛰	ꛮ꛰	ꛯ꛰
pɛn	rɛn	mɛn	maʔ	tɯ	kiʔ	mɔn	mbaʔ	tɛt	ŋma	tɛn	tuʔ	saʔ	faʔ	fü	ŋgɔm
				ꛤ꛱		ꛦ꛱									
				t		m									

=== Punctuation ===
Bamum punctuation
꛲	꛳	꛴	꛵	꛶	꛷
nʒɛmli: introduces proper names or changes the meaning of a word	. period	: colon	, comma	; semicolon	? question mark

== Numerals ==
The last ten base characters in the syllabary are used for both letters and numerals:

Bamum digits
ꛯ	ꛦ	ꛧ	ꛨ	ꛩ	ꛪ	ꛫ	ꛬ	ꛭ	ꛮ
ɣɔm 0	mɔ 1	mbaa 2	tɛt 3	kpa 4	tɛn 5	ntuu 6	sa 7	faa 8	vü 9

Historically, ꛯ was used for ten but was changed to zero when the numeral system became a decimal one.

== All versions (phases A–G) ==
Bamum characters found through Phase A
Phase A	Interpretation	Phase A	Interpretation	Phase A	Interpretation	Phase A	Interpretation
𖠀	ŋkü mfɔn	𖠒	ntɔʔpɛn	𖠤	mgbasa	𖠶	mɔɔmɯt
𖠁	gbie fɔn	𖠓	kɯkɯtnda	𖠥	mɯnʒɔmndɯʔ	𖠷	ʃum
𖠂	pɔn mfɔn pipəmgbie	𖠔	nkindi	𖠦	mɔɔmpuʔ	𖠸	lɔmmə
𖠃	pɔn mfɔn pipəmba	𖠕	suu	𖠧	kafa	𖠹	fir'i
𖠄	naa mfɔn	𖠖	ŋkünzɯm	𖠨	pa lerəwa	𖠺	rɔm
𖠅	ʃünʃüt	𖠗	lapaʔ	𖠩	nda lerəwa	𖠻	kpɔʔ
𖠆	tita mfɔn	𖠘	lɛt kut	𖠪	pɛt	𖠼	sɔʔ
𖠇	nza mfɔn	𖠙	ntap mfaa	𖠫	məmkpɛn	𖠽	map piet
𖠈	ʃinda pa nʒi	𖠚	məkɯp	𖠬	nika	𖠾	ʃirə
𖠉	pɔn pa nʒi pipəmgbie	𖠛	paʃə	𖠭	pup	𖠿	ntap
𖠊	pɔn pa nʒi pipəmba	𖠜	ɣɯərə	𖠮	tuəp	𖡀	ʃɔʔ nʃut yum
𖠋	məmgbie	𖠝	pamʃə	𖠯	luəp	𖡁	nyit mɔŋkɯəʔ
𖠌	tu məmba	𖠞	mɔn ŋgɯət	𖠰	sɔnʒam	𖡂	paarə
𖠍	ŋaŋu	𖠟	nzun mɯt	𖠱	tɯtɯwɛn	𖡃	nkaarə
𖠎	məmvɯx	𖠠	u yuʔ nə	𖠲	mənyi	𖡄	(unknown)
𖠏	mansuə	𖠡	ɣɯəɣɯə	𖠳	kɛt		
𖠐	mvɯəŋam	𖠢	ntap ntaa	𖠴	ndaaŋgɯət		
𖠑	sɯnyam	𖠣	sisa	𖠵	kuɔʔ		
A	Interpretation	A	Interpretation	A	Interpretation	A	Interpretation

Bamum characters found through Phase B
Phase		Interpretation	Phase		Interpretation	Phase		Interpretation
A	B	Interpretation	A	B	Interpretation	A	B	Interpretation
𖡗	𖡗	nʃüt	𖡨	𖡨	tu nsie	𖡹	𖡹	mɯʔ
𖡘	𖡘	tu məmgbie	𖡩	𖡩	ʃɛt nʒaʔ	𖡺	𖡺	ŋguɔʔ ("small termite")
𖡙	𖡙	sie	𖡪	𖡪	ʃɯəʔtu	𖡻	𖡻	ŋguɔʔ ("large termite")
𖡚	𖡚	sɛt tu	𖡫	𖡫	mfɔn tɯəʔ		𖡼	mfiyaʔ
𖡛	𖡛	lɔm ntɯm		𖡬	mbit mbaakɛt	𖡽	𖡽	sü
𖡜	𖡜	mba məle	𖡭	𖡭	nyi ntɯm	𖡾	𖡾	mbɯri
𖡝	𖡝	kiem		𖡮	kɯpuʔ	𖡿	𖡿	mɔntien
𖡞	𖡞	yɯrə	𖡯	𖡯	ɣɯɣɛn	𖢀	𖢀	nyəmə
𖡟	𖡟	mbaarə	𖡰	𖡰	kɯyɯx	𖢁	𖢁	puŋaam
𖡠	𖡠	kam	𖡱	𖡱	laanə	𖢂	𖢂	mɯt ŋget
𖡡	𖡡	peʃi	𖡲	𖡲	parum	𖢃	𖢃	fɯx
𖡢	𖡢	yafu lerəwa	𖡳	𖡳	vɯm	𖢄	𖢄	mbuɔʔ
𖡣	𖡣	lam nʃut nyam	𖡴	𖡴	ŋkindi mvɔp	𖢅	𖢅	fe
𖡤	𖡤	ntie ʃɯɔʔ	𖡵	𖡵	ŋgɯ mbu		𖢆	kɯəm
𖡥	𖡥	ndu nʒaa	𖡶	𖡶	wuət	𖢇	𖢇	ma nʒɯəna
𖡦	𖡦	ɣɯɣɯəm	𖢈	𖢈	ma nʒuʔa	𖡷	𖡷	sakɯə
𖡧	𖡧	pit	𖡸	𖡸	taam			
A	B	Interpretation	A	B	Interpretation	A	B	Interpretation

Bamum characters found through Phase C
Phase			Interpretation	Phase			Interpretation	Phase			Interpretation
A	B	C	Interpretation	A	B	C	Interpretation	A	B	C	Interpretation
𖢏	𖢏	𖢏	ŋkü məmba	𖢫	𖢫	𖢫	ndida	𖣇	𖣇	𖣇	nsuɔt ŋɔm
𖢐	𖢐	𖢐	nza	𖢬	𖢬	𖢬	taaʃə	𖣈	𖣈	𖣈	nʒee
𖢑	𖢑	𖢑	yum	𖢭	𖢭	𖢭	nʒüʔ	𖣉	𖣉	𖣉	kɛt
𖢒	𖢒	𖢒	waŋkuɔʔ	𖢮	𖢮	𖢮	tita yü	𖣊	𖣊	𖣊	ŋgu
𖡅	𖢓	𖢓	ŋgɛn	𖢯	𖢯	𖢯	suət	𖡆	𖣋	𖣋	məsi
𖢔	𖢔	𖢔	ndɯəre	𖢰	𖢰	𖢰	ŋguən nyam		𖣌	𖣌	mbuəm
𖢕	𖢕	𖢕	ŋkaʔ	𖢱	𖢱	𖢱	vɯx	𖣍	𖣍	𖣍	lu
𖢖	𖢖	𖢖	ɣarə	𖢲	𖢲	𖢲	nansanaʔ	𖣎	𖣎	𖣎	kut
𖢗	𖢗	𖢗	mbeket	𖢳	𖢳	𖢳	ma kɯəri	𖡇	𖣏	𖣏	nʒam
𖢘	𖢘	𖢘	gbayi	𖢴	𖢴	𖢴	ntaa	𖣐	𖣐	𖣐	ŋɔm
𖢙	𖢙	𖢙	nyir mkparaʔ mɯn	𖢵	𖢵	𖢵	ŋguɔn	𖣑	𖣑	𖣑	wup
𖢚	𖢚	𖢚	ntu mbit	𖢶	𖢶	𖢶	lap	𖣒	𖣒	𖣒	ŋguet
𖢛	𖢛	𖢛	mbɯm	𖢷	𖢷	𖢷	mbirien	𖣓	𖣓	𖣓	nsɔm
𖢜	𖢜	𖢜	pirien	𖢸	𖢸	𖢸	mgbasaʔ	𖣔	𖣔	𖣔	ntɛn
𖢝	𖢝	𖢝	ndɔmbu	𖢹	𖢹	𖢹	ntɯngba	𖣕	𖣕	𖣕	kuɔp nkaarə
𖢞	𖢞	𖢞	mbaa	𖢺	𖢺	𖢺	tɯtɯx	𖣖	𖣖	𖣖	nsun
𖢟	𖢟	𖢟	kɯʃɯəp	𖢻	𖢻	𖢻	ŋgum	𖣗	𖣗	𖣗	ndam
𖢠	𖢠	𖢠	ɣap	𖢼	𖢼	𖢼	fü	𖣘	𖣘	𖣘	ma nsie
𖢡	𖢡	𖢡	kɯkaʔ	𖢽	𖢽	𖢽	ndɯt	𖣙	𖣙	𖣙	yaa
𖢢	𖢢	𖢢	yu muɔmə	𖢾	𖢾	𖢾	nsa		𖣚	𖣚	ndap
𖢣	𖢣	𖢣	nzɯm	𖢿	𖢿	𖢿	nʃaʔ	𖣛	𖣛	𖣛	ʃüʔ
𖢤	𖢤	𖢤	mbü	𖣀	𖣀	𖣀	buŋ	𖣜	𖣜	𖣜	ʃɛtfɔn
𖢥	𖢥	𖢥	nsɯən	𖣁	𖣁	𖣁	vɯəpɛn		𖣝	𖣝	mbi
𖢦	𖢦	𖢦	mbit	𖣂	𖣂	𖣂	mbɛrə	𖣞	𖣞	𖣞	məmba
𖢧	𖢧	𖢧	yɯʔ	𖣃	𖣃	𖣃	ru	𖡈	𖣟	𖣟	mbanyi
𖢨	𖢨	𖢨	kparaʔ	𖣄	𖣄	𖣄	nʒəm	𖣠	𖣠	𖣠	kɯsɯx
𖢩	𖢩	𖢩	kaa	𖣅	𖣅	𖣅	lam		𖣡	𖣡	mbɯx
𖢪	𖢪	𖢪	sɯx	𖣆	𖣆	𖣆	tituəp		𖣢	𖣢	kɯm
A	B	C	Interpretation	A	B	C	Interpretation	A	B	C	Interpretation

Bamum characters found through Phase D
Phase				Interpretation	Phase				Interpretation
A	B	C	D	Interpretation	A	B	C	D	Interpretation
𖣱	𖣱	𖣱	𖣱	mbuɔ	𖤝	𖤝	𖤝	𖤝	mfo
𖣲	𖣲	𖣲	𖣲	wap		𖤞	𖤞	𖤞	lum
𖣳	𖣳	𖣳	𖣳	nʒi	𖤟	𖤟	𖤟	𖤟	nsiep
𖣴	𖣴	𖣴	𖣴	mfɔn	𖣣	𖣣	𖣣	𖤠	mbaa
𖣵	𖣵	𖣵	𖣵	nʒie	𖤡	𖤡	𖤡	𖤡	kwət
𖣶	𖣶	𖣶	𖣶	lie	𖡉	𖤢	𖤢	𖤢	nyɛt
	𖣷	𖣷	𖣷	nʒɯt	𖡊			𖤣	tɯən
	𖣸	𖣸	𖣸	nʃe	𖡋	𖤤	𖤤	𖤤	sɔt
𖣹	𖣹	𖣹	𖣹	ŋgaamə	𖣤	𖣤	𖣤	𖤥	yuwɔʔ
𖣺	𖣺	𖣺	𖣺	nyam	𖤦	𖤦	𖤦	𖤦	kɯm
𖣻	𖣻	𖣻	𖣻	wuən	𖤧	𖤧	𖤧	𖤧	rəm
𖣼	𖣼	𖣼	𖣼	ŋkun	𖤨	𖤨	𖤨	𖤨	tee
𖣽	𖣽	𖣽	𖣽	ʃe	𖤩	𖤩	𖤩	𖤩	ŋkɯəʔ
𖣾	𖣾	𖣾	𖣾	ŋkap	𖤪	𖤪	𖤪	𖤪	mfɯə
𖣿	𖣿	𖣿	𖣿	kɯətmɯn	𖤫	𖤫	𖤫	𖤫	nsiet
	𖤀	𖤀	𖤀	tɯt	𖤬	𖤬	𖤬	𖤬	kɯp
𖤁	𖤁	𖤁	𖤁	ʃɯə	𖤭	𖤭	𖤭	𖤭	pip
𖤂	𖤂	𖤂	𖤂	nʒap	𖤮	𖤮	𖤮	𖤮	pɯtə
𖤃	𖤃	𖤃	𖤃	sü	𖤯	𖤯	𖤯	𖤯	nyü
𖤄	𖤄	𖤄	𖤄	kɛt	𖢉	𖢉	𖤰	𖤰	lɛt
	𖤅	𖤅	𖤅	yəmmə		𖢊	𖤱	𖤱	ŋgaam
	𖤆	𖤆	𖤆	kuɔm	𖤲	𖤲	𖤲	𖤲	mfie
𖤇	𖤇	𖤇	𖤇	sap		𖤳	𖤳	𖤳	ŋgwən
𖤈	𖤈	𖤈	𖤈	mfɯt		𖤴	𖤴	𖤴	yuɔm
𖤉	𖤉	𖤉	𖤉	ndɯx		𖤵	𖤵	𖤵	pap
𖤊	𖤊	𖤊	𖤊	maleri	𖤶	𖤶	𖤶	𖤶	yuɔp
𖤋	𖤋	𖤋	𖤋	mɯt	𖤷	𖤷	𖤷	𖤷	ndam
𖤌	𖤌	𖤌	𖤌	sɯəʔ	𖤸	𖤸	𖤸	𖤸	ntɯm
𖤍	𖤍	𖤍	𖤍	yɛn	𖤹	𖤹	𖤹	𖤹	suə
𖤎	𖤎	𖤎	𖤎	nʒɯəm	𖤺	𖤺	𖤺	𖤺	kun
𖤏	𖤏	𖤏	𖤏	kɯɔt mbuə	𖤻	𖤻	𖤻	𖤻	ŋgɯx
𖤐	𖤐	𖤐	𖤐	ŋkɯri	𖤼	𖤼	𖤼	𖤼	ŋkie
	𖤑	𖤑	𖤑	tu	𖤽	𖤽	𖤽	𖤽	tuɔt
𖤒	𖤒	𖤒	𖤒	ɣaa	𖤾	𖤾	𖤾	𖤾	mɯn
𖤓	𖤓	𖤓	𖤓	ŋkye		𖤿	𖤿	𖤿	kuʔ
𖤔	𖤔	𖤔	𖤔	fɯfɯət		𖥀	𖥀	𖥀	nsum
𖤕	𖤕	𖤕	𖤕	nde	𖥁	𖥁	𖥁	𖥁	tɯn
𖤖	𖤖	𖤖	𖤖	mgbɔfum	𖥂	𖥂	𖥂	𖥂	mənʒɛt
	𖤗	𖤗	𖤗	lɯəp	𖥃	𖥃	𖥃	𖥃	ŋgap
𖤘	𖤘	𖤘	𖤘	ndɔn		𖥄	𖥄	𖥄	lɯm
𖤙	𖤙	𖤙	𖤙	mɔni	𖥅	𖥅	𖥅	𖥅	ŋguɔm
𖤚	𖤚		𖤚	mgbɯn	𖥆	𖥆	𖥆	𖥆	nʃut
𖤛	𖤛	𖤛	𖤛	puut	𖥇	𖥇	𖥇	𖥇	nʒüʔ
𖤜	𖤜	𖤜	𖤜	mgbie					
A	B	C	D	Interpretation	A	B	C	D	Interpretation

Bamum characters found through Phase E
Phase					Interpretation	Phase					Interpretation
A	B	C	D	E	Interpretation	A	B	C	D	E	Interpretation
𖥦	𖥦	𖥦	𖥦	𖥦	ndap	𖦝	𖦝	𖦝	𖦝	𖦝	vɯə
𖥧	𖥧	𖥧	𖥧	𖥧	tɔɔn	𖦞	𖦞	𖦞	𖦞	𖦞	wɯx
𖥨	𖥨	𖥨	𖥨	𖥨	mbɯm	𖦟	𖦟	𖦟	𖦟	𖦟	laam
𖥩	𖥩	𖥩	𖥩	𖥩	lap	𖦠	𖦠	𖦠	𖦠	𖦠	pu
𖥪	𖥪	𖥪	𖥪	𖥪	vɔm	𖦡	𖦡	𖦡	𖦡	𖦡	taaʔ
𖥫	𖥫	𖥫	𖥫	𖥫	lɔn	𖦢	𖦢	𖦢	𖦢	𖦢	ɣaamə
𖥬	𖥬	𖥬	𖥬	𖥬	paa		𖦣	𖦣	𖦣	𖦣	ŋɯrɯt
𖥭	𖥭	𖥭	𖥭	𖥭	sɔm	𖦤	𖦤	𖦤	𖦤	𖦤	ʃɯəʔ
𖥮	𖥮	𖥮	𖥮	𖥮	raʔ	𖦥	𖦥	𖦥	𖦥	𖦥	mgbɛn
𖥯	𖥯	𖥯	𖥯	𖥯	nʃuɔp		𖦦	𖦦	𖦦	𖦦	mbe
𖥰	𖥰	𖥰	𖥰	𖥰	ndun	𖦧	𖦧	𖦧	𖦧	𖦧	nzaʔ
𖥱	𖥱	𖥱	𖥱	𖥱	puə	𖦨	𖦨	𖦨	𖦨	𖦨	nkɔm
𖥲	𖥲	𖥲	𖥲	𖥲	tam	𖦩	𖦩	𖦩	𖦩	𖦩	gbɛt
𖥳	𖥳	𖥳	𖥳	𖥳	ŋka	𖦪	𖦪	𖦪	𖦪	𖦪	tum
𖥴	𖥴	𖥴	𖥴	𖥴	kpɯx	𖦫	𖦫	𖦫	𖦫	𖦫	küt
𖥵	𖥵	𖥵	𖥵	𖥵	wuɔ		𖦬	𖦬	𖦬	𖦬	yap
	𖥶	𖥶	𖥶	𖥶	se	𖡏	𖦭	𖦭	𖦭	𖦭	nyi
𖥷	𖥷	𖥷	𖥷	𖥷	ŋgɯət	𖦮	𖦮	𖦮	𖦮	𖦮	yit
𖡌	𖥸	𖥸	𖥸	𖥸	paam		𖦯	𖦯	𖦯	𖦯	mfɯʔ
𖥹	𖥹	𖥹	𖥹	𖥹	tɔɔ	𖦰	𖦰	𖦰	𖦰	𖦰	ndiaʔ
𖥺	𖥺	𖥺	𖥺	𖥺	kuɔp	𖦱	𖦱	𖦱	𖦱	𖦱	pieʔ
𖥻	𖥻	𖥻	𖥻	𖥻	lɔm	𖦲	𖦲	𖦲	𖦲	𖦲	yüʔ
𖡍	𖥼	𖥼	𖥼	𖥼	nʃie	𖦳	𖦳	𖦳	𖦳	𖦳	lɯəm
𖥽	𖥽	𖥽	𖥽	𖥽	ŋgɔp	𖦴	𖦴	𖦴	𖦴	𖦴	fü
𖡎	𖥾	𖥾	𖥾	𖥾	məm	𖦵	𖦵	𖦵	𖦵	𖦵	gbɯx
𖥿	𖥿	𖥿	𖥿	𖥿	ŋkɯx	𖦶	𖦶	𖦶	𖦶	𖦶	ŋkup
𖦀	𖦀	𖦀	𖦀	𖦀	ŋɔʔ	𖦷	𖦷	𖦷	𖦷	𖦷	kɛt
𖦁	𖦁	𖦁	𖦁	𖦁	nʃü	𖦸	𖦸	𖦸	𖦸	𖦸	mə
𖦂	𖦂	𖦂	𖦂	𖦂	rimgba		𖦹	𖦹	𖦹	𖦹	ŋkaami
𖣥	𖣥	𖣥	𖦃	𖦃	nʒɯx	𖦺	𖦺	𖦺	𖦺	𖦺	ɣɛt
𖢋	𖢋	𖡲	𖡲	𖡲	nsɛn	𖦻	𖦻	𖦻	𖦻	𖦻	fa
𖦄	𖦄	𖦄	𖦄	𖦄	pem	𖦼	𖦼	𖦼	𖦼	𖦼	ntum
𖦅	𖦅	𖦅	𖦅	𖦅	saa	𖦽	𖦽	𖦽	𖦽	𖦽	pɯt
𖦆	𖦆	𖦆	𖦆	𖦆	ŋgurə	𖦾	𖦾	𖦾	𖦾	𖦾	yɯm
𖦇	𖦇	𖦇	𖦇	𖦇	mgba	𖦿	𖦿	𖦿	𖦿	𖦿	ŋgɯə
𖦈	𖦈	𖦈	𖦈	𖦈	ɣɯx	𖧀	𖧀	𖧀	𖧀	𖧀	nyi
𖦉	𖦉	𖦉	𖦉	𖦉	ŋkɯəm	𖧁	𖧁	𖧁	𖧁	𖧁	nzuʔ
𖦊	𖦊	𖦊	𖦊	𖦊	nʒəmli	𖧂	𖧂	𖧂	𖧂	𖧂	pɔɔn
𖦋	𖦋	𖦋	𖦋	𖦋	map	𖣦	𖣦	𖣦	𖧃	𖧃	mie
𖦌	𖦌	𖦌	𖦌	𖦌	lɔɔt	𖧄	𖧄	𖧄	𖧄	𖧄	füt
	𖦍	𖦍			ŋgee	𖧅	𖧅	𖧅	𖧅	𖧅	nə
𖦎	𖦎	𖦎	𖦎	𖦎	ndiʔ	𖣧	𖣧	𖣧	𖧆	𖧆	muə
𖦏	𖦏	𖦏	𖦏	𖦏	tən ntɯm	𖥈	𖥈	𖥈	𖥈	𖧇	ɣɯə
𖦐	𖦐	𖦐	𖦐	𖦐	sɛt	𖧈	𖧈	𖧈	𖧈	𖧈	fu i
𖦑	𖦑	𖦑	𖦑	𖦑	pum	𖧉	𖧉	𖧉	𖧉	𖧉	mvi
	𖦒	𖦒			ndaa	𖧊	𖧊	𖧊	𖧊	𖧊	puaʔ
𖦓	𖦓	𖦓	𖦓	𖦓	ŋguəʃə nyam		𖧋	𖧋		𖧋	ŋkum
𖦔	𖦔	𖦔	𖦔	𖦔	yie		𖧌	𖧌	𖧌	𖧌	kut
𖦕	𖦕	𖦕	𖦕	𖦕	ɣɯn	𖧍	𖧍	𖧍	𖧍	𖧍	piɛt
𖦖	𖦖	𖦖	𖦖	𖦖	tuə	𖧎	𖧎	𖧎	𖧎	𖧎	ntap
𖦗	𖦗	𖦗	𖦗	𖦗	yɯə	𖧏	𖧏	𖧏	𖧏	𖧏	yɯət
𖦘	𖦘	𖦘	𖦘	𖦘	pɔ	𖧐	𖧐	𖧐	𖧐	𖧐	ŋgup
𖦙	𖦙	𖦙	𖦙	𖦙	tumə	𖧑	𖧑	𖧑	𖧑	𖧑	pa
𖦚	𖦚	𖦚	𖦚	𖦚	kɯə			𖧒			fu
	𖦛	𖦛	𖦛	𖦛	suən		𖧓	𖧓	𖧓	𖧓	fɔm
𖦜	𖦜	𖦜	𖦜	𖦜	tɯəʔ			𖧔			nʒe
A	B	C	D	E	Interpretation	A	B	C	D	E	Interpretation

Bamum characters found through Phase G (phases C–E are often graphically simplified from the forms displayed here)
Phase							Interpretation	Phase							Interpretation
A	B	C	D	E	F	G	Interpretation	A	B	C	D	E	F	G	Interpretation
𖧕	𖧕	𖧕	𖧕	𖧕	𖧇	ꚠ	a	𖧪	𖧪	𖧪	𖧪	𖧪	𖨡	ꛉ	wü
					ꚠ꛰	ꚠ꛰	a						𖨡꛰	ꛉ꛰	üʔ
𖨃	𖨃	𖨃	𖨃	𖨃	𖨃	ꚡ	ka	𖥚	𖥚	𖥚	𖥚	𖨢	𖨢	ꛊ	pe
𖡐					𖨃꛰	ꚡ꛰	kaʔ						𖨢꛰	ꛊ꛰	peʔ
𖨄	𖨄	𖨄	𖨄	𖨄	𖨄	ꚢ	u	𖧫	𖧫	𖧫	𖧫	𖧫	𖦓	ꛋ	fe
					𖨄꛰	ꚢ꛰	wuʔ	𖡒	𖧬	𖧬	𖧬	𖧬			ve
𖥉	𖥉	𖥉	𖥉	𖨅	𖨅	ꚣ	ku						𖦓꛰	ꛋ꛰	feʔ
					𖨅꛰	ꚣ꛰	kuʔ								
𖨆	𖨆	𖨆	𖨆	𖨆	𖨆	ꚤ	e	𖨣	𖨣	𖨣	𖨣	𖨣	𖨣	ꛌ	ru
					𖨆꛰	ꚤ꛰	eʔ						𖨣꛰	ꛌ꛰	ruʔ
	𖨇	𖨇	𖨇	𖨇	𖨇	ꚥ	re	𖡓	𖧭	𖧭	𖧭	𖧭	𖧂?	ꛍ	lu
𖥊	𖥊	𖥊	𖥊		𖨇꛰	ꚥ꛰	rɛn						ꛍ꛰	ꛍ꛰	luʔ
𖥋	𖥋	𖥋	𖥋		𖨈	ꚦ	tə	𖧮	𖧮	𖧮	𖧮	𖧮	ꛎ	ꛎ	mi
𖥌	𖥌	𖥌	𖥌	𖧖	𖨈꛰	ꚦ꛰	tɔʔ						ꛎ꛰	ꛎ꛰	miʔ
𖧗	𖧗	𖧗	𖧗	𖧗	𖦑	ꚧ	ɔ	𖥛	𖥛	𖥛	𖥛	𖨤	𖨤	ꛏ	n'i
					𖦑꛰	ꚧ꛰	ɔʔ	𖡔					𖨤꛰	ꛏ꛰	nɛn
𖥍	𖥍	𖥍	𖥍	𖧀	𖨉	ꚨ	nyi	𖧯	𖧯	𖧯	𖧯	𖧯	𖨥	ꛐ	rɯx
					𖨉꛰	ꚨ꛰	nye						𖨥꛰	ꛐ꛰	rɯʔ
𖧘	𖧘	𖧘	𖧘	𖧘	𖥦	ꚩ	i	𖧰	𖧰	𖧰	𖧰	𖧰	𖥱	ꛑ	rə
					𖥦꛰	ꚩ꛰	iʔ						𖥱꛰	ꛑ꛰	rɔ
					𖨊	ꚪ	la	𖣩	𖣩	𖣩	𖨦	𖨦	𖨦	ꛒ	kɛn
𖧙	𖧙	𖧙	𖧙	𖧙	𖨊꛰	ꚪ꛰	laʔ	𖣪	𖣪	𖣪			𖨦꛰	ꛒ꛰	kɛn (with high tone)
𖧚	𖧚	𖧚	𖧚	𖧚	𖥯	ꚫ	pa		𖨧		𖨧	𖨧	𖨧	ꛓ	ŋkwən
					𖥯꛰	ꚫ꛰	paʔ	𖧱	𖧱	𖧱	𖧱	𖧱	𖨧꛰	ꛓ꛰	ŋuət
𖥎	𖥎	𖥎	𖥎	𖨋	𖨋	ꚬ	rii	𖨨	𖨨	𖨨	𖨨	𖨨	𖨨	ꛔ	ŋga
					𖨋꛰	ꚬ꛰	riʔ						𖨨꛰	ꛔ꛰	ŋgaʔ
𖨌	𖨌	𖨌	𖨌	𖨌	𖨌	ꚭ	rie	𖧲	𖧲	𖧲	𖧲	𖧲	𖥮	ꛕ	ŋa
					𖨌꛰	ꚭ꛰	z	𖣫	𖣫	𖣫			𖥮꛰	ꛕ꛰	ŋaʔ
𖥏	𖥏	𖥏	𖥏	𖤰	𖤰	ꚮ	lee		𖧳	𖧳		𖧳	𖨩	ꛖ	ʃɔ
					𖤰꛰	ꚮ꛰	leʔ	𖥜	𖥜	𖥜	𖥜	𖧴	𖨩꛰	ꛖ꛰	ʃɔʔ
𖥐	𖥐	𖥐	𖥐	𖨍	𖨍	ꚯ	mee	𖨪	𖨪	𖨪	𖨪	𖨪	𖨪	ꛗ	puə
				𖥐	𖨍꛰	ꚯ꛰	meʔ	𖥝	𖥝	𖥝	𖥝	𖦠	𖨪꛰	ꛗ꛰	puʔ
𖧛	𖧛	𖧛	𖧛	𖧛	𖨎	ꚰ	taa	𖧵	𖧵	𖧵	𖧵	𖧵	𖧒	ꛘ	fu
𖧜	𖧜	𖧜	𖧜	𖧜	𖨎꛰	ꚰ꛰	taʔ						𖧒꛰	ꛘ꛰	fuʔ
𖧝	𖧝	𖧝	𖧝	𖧝	𖨏	ꚱ	ndaa					𖨫	𖨫	ꛙ	fɔm
					𖨏꛰	ꚱ꛰	ndaʔ	𖥞	𖥞	𖥞	𖥞		𖨫꛰	ꛙ꛰	mvɔp
𖨐	𖨐	𖨐	𖨐	𖨐	𖨐	ꚲ	nʒəm	𖨬		𖨬	𖨬	𖨬	𖨬	ꛚ	wa
					𖨐꛰	ꚲ꛰	yəm						𖨬꛰	ꛚ꛰	waʔ
𖥑	𖥑	𖥑	𖥑	𖨑	𖨑	ꚳ	m	𖧶	𖧶	𖧶	𖧶	𖧶	𖥭	ꛛ	na
					𖨑	ꚳ꛰	n	𖡕	𖣬	𖣬			ꛛ꛰	ꛛ꛰	naʔ
𖥒	𖥒	𖥒	𖥒	𖨒	𖨒	ꚴ	suu	𖨭	𖨭	𖨭	𖨭	𖨭	𖨭	ꛜ	li
					𖨒꛰	ꚴ꛰	suʔ	𖣭	𖣭	𖣭			𖨭꛰	ꛜ꛰	liʔ
𖥓	𖥓	𖥓	𖥓	𖤱	𖤱	ꚵ	mu	𖧷	𖧷	𖧷	𖧷	𖧷	𖧡	ꛝ	pi
					𖤱꛰	ꚵ꛰	muʔ	𖣮	𖣮	𖣮			𖧡꛰	ꛝ꛰	pin
𖥔	𖥔	𖥔	𖥔	𖨓	𖨓	ꚶ	ʃii	𖥟	𖥟	𖥟	𖥟	𖨮	𖨮	ꛞ	lɔʔ
𖣨	𖣨	𖣨	𖧞	𖧞	𖨓꛰	ꚶ꛰	ʃiʔ	𖧸	𖧸	𖧸	𖧸	𖧸	𖨮꛰	ꛞ꛰	lɔʔ
𖨔	𖨔	𖨔	𖨔	𖨔	𖨔	ꚷ	si		𖧹	𖧹	𖧹	𖧹	𖨯	ꛟ	kɔ
					𖨔꛰	ꚷ꛰	siʔ						𖨯꛰	ꛟ꛰	kɔʔ
𖥕	𖥕	𖥕	𖥕		𖧁	ꚸ	ʃɯx	𖨰	𖨰	𖨰	𖨰	𖨰	𖨰	ꛠ	mbɛn
𖧟	𖧟	𖧟	𖧟	𖧟	ꚸ꛰	ꚸ꛰	yɯx		𖣯	𖣯	𖣗		𖨰꛰	ꛠ꛰	pɛn
𖨕	𖨕	𖨕	𖨕	𖨕	𖨕	ꚹ	sɯx	𖥠	𖥠	𖥠	𖥠	𖨱	𖨱	ꛡ	rɛn
					𖨕꛰	ꚹ꛰	sɯʔ						𖨱꛰	ꛡ꛰	rɛn
𖥖	𖥖	𖥖	𖥖	𖨖	𖨖	ꚺ	kye	𖧺	𖧺	𖧺	𖧺	𖧺	𖥩	ꛢ	mɛn
					𖨖꛰	ꚺ꛰	kyeʔ						𖥩꛰	ꛢ꛰	mɛn
𖨗	𖨗	𖨗	𖨗	𖨗	𖨗	ꚻ	kɛt		𖢌	𖧻	𖧻	𖧻	𖨲	ꛣ	ma
					𖨗꛰	ꚻ꛰	keʔ	𖧼	𖧼	𖧼	𖧼	𖧼	𖨲꛰	ꛣ꛰	maʔ
𖨘	𖨘	𖨘	𖨘	𖨘	𖨘	ꚼ	nuə	𖥡	𖥡	𖥡	𖥡	𖣻	𖣻	ꛤ	ti
𖧠	𖧠	𖧠	𖧠	𖧠	𖨘꛰	ꚼ꛰	ŋuə	𖧽	𖧽	𖧽	𖧽	𖧽	𖣻꛰	ꛤ꛰	tɯ
	𖥗	𖥗	𖥗	𖨙	𖨙	ꚽ	nu	𖧾	𖧾	𖧾	𖧾	𖧾	ꛥ	ꛥ	ki
					𖨙	ꚽ꛰	nuʔ	𖢍	𖢍				ꛥ꛰	ꛥ꛰	kiʔ
𖨚	𖨚	𖨚	𖨚	𖨚	𖨚	ꚾ	nʒuə	𖨳	𖨳	𖨳	𖨳	𖨳	𖨳	ꛦ	mɔ
𖧡	𖧡	𖧡	𖧡	𖧡	𖨚꛰	ꚾ꛰	yuən		𖧿	𖧿		𖧿	𖨳꛰	ꛦ꛰	mɔn
	𖧢	𖧢	𖧢	𖧢	𖨛	ꚿ	yɔʔ ("swimming")	𖨴	𖨴	𖨴	𖨴	𖨴	𖨴	ꛧ	mbaa
𖧣	𖧣	𖧣	𖧣	𖧣	𖨛꛰	ꚿ꛰	yɔʔ ("cover")	𖡖					𖨴꛰	ꛧ꛰	mbaʔ
𖥘	𖥘	𖥘	𖥘	𖨜	𖨜	ꛀ	ʃu	𖨵	𖨵	𖨵	𖨵	𖨵	𖨵	ꛨ	tɛt
					𖨜꛰	ꛀ꛰	ʃuʔ		𖣰	𖣰			𖨵꛰	ꛨ꛰	tɛt (with high tone)
𖧤	𖧤	𖧤	𖧤	𖧤	ꛁ	ꛁ	yuʔ	𖨶	𖨶	𖨶	𖨶	𖨶	𖨶	ꛩ	kpa
𖧥	𖧥	𖧥	𖧥	𖧥	ꛁ꛰	ꛁ꛰	yun						𖨶꛰	ꛩ꛰	ŋma
𖨝	𖨝	𖨝	𖨝	𖨝	𖨝	ꛂ	ya	𖨀	𖨀	𖨀	𖨀	𖨀	𖦨	ꛪ	tɛn
					𖨝꛰	ꛂ꛰	yaʔ						𖦨꛰	ꛪ꛰	tɛn
𖡑	𖨞	𖨞	𖨞	𖨞	𖨞	ꛃ	nʃa	𖥢	𖥢	𖥢	𖥢	𖥣	𖥣	ꛫ	ntuu
					𖨞꛰	ꛃ꛰	ʃaʔ						𖥣꛰	ꛫ꛰	tuʔ
	𖧦	𖧦	𖧦	𖧦	𖧳	ꛄ	kɯx	𖦅𖥣	𖦅𖥣	𖦅𖥣	𖦅𖥣	𖨷	𖨷	ꛬ	samba
					𖧳꛰	ꛄ꛰	ɣɯ	𖥤	𖥤	𖥤	𖥤		𖨷꛰	ꛬ꛰	saʔ
𖧧	𖧧	𖧧	𖧧	𖧧	𖨟	ꛅ	pɯx	𖥥𖦸	𖥥𖦸	𖥥𖦸	𖥥𖦸	ꛭ	𖤩	ꛭ	faamə
					𖨟꛰	ꛅ꛰	pɯʔ	𖨁	𖨁	𖨁	𖨁	𖨁	𖤩꛰	ꛭ꛰	faʔ
𖧨	𖧨	𖧨	𖧨	𖧨	𖧔	ꛆ	nʒe	𖧹𖨸	𖧹𖨸	𖧹𖨸	𖧹𖨸	𖨸	𖨸	ꛮ	kɔvü
					𖧔꛰	ꛆ꛰	nʒeʔ						𖨸꛰	ꛮ꛰	fü
𖥙	𖥙	𖥙	𖥙	𖨠	𖨠	ꛇ	nte	𖧹𖨂	𖧹𖨂	𖧹𖨂	𖧹𖨂	𖨂	𖧾	ꛯ	ɣɔm
					𖨠꛰	ꛇ꛰	teʔ	𖢎	𖢎				𖧾꛰	ꛯ꛰	ŋgɔm
𖧩	𖧩	𖧩	𖧩	𖧩	𖥰	ꛈ	pü								
					𖥰꛰	ꛈ꛰	püʔ								
A	B	C	D	E	F	G	Interpretation	A	B	C	D	E	F	G	Interpretation

== Unicode ==
Bamum's 88 characters were added to the Unicode standard in October, 2009 with the release of version 5.2. Bamum Unicode character names are based on the International Phonetic Alphabet forms given in L’écriture des Bamum (1950) by Idelette Dugast and M.D.W. Jeffreys:

Usage	Letters															
Dugast & Jeffreys	a	b	d	ɛ	e	ǝ	f	ɣ	g	i	k	l	m	n	ŋ	ɔ
Unicode name	A	B	D	EE	EA	E	F	GH	G	I	K	L	M	N	NG	O
French	a	b	d	è	é	e	f	gh	g	i	k	l	m	n	ng	o
Dugast & Jeffreys	p	r	s	ʃ	t	u	ü	ɯ	v	w	x	y	z	ʒ	ʔ	
Unicode name	P	R	S	SH	T	U	UE	EU	V	W	X	Y	Z	J	Q	
French	p	r	s	sh	t	u	ü	ù	v	w	x	y	z	j	’	

The Unicode block for Bamum is U+A6A0–U+A6FF:

Bamum^{[1]}^{[2]} Official Unicode Consortium code chart (PDF)
	0	1	2	3	4	5	6	7	8	9	A	B	C	D	E	F
U+A6Ax	ꚠ	ꚡ	ꚢ	ꚣ	ꚤ	ꚥ	ꚦ	ꚧ	ꚨ	ꚩ	ꚪ	ꚫ	ꚬ	ꚭ	ꚮ	ꚯ
U+A6Bx	ꚰ	ꚱ	ꚲ	ꚳ	ꚴ	ꚵ	ꚶ	ꚷ	ꚸ	ꚹ	ꚺ	ꚻ	ꚼ	ꚽ	ꚾ	ꚿ
U+A6Cx	ꛀ	ꛁ	ꛂ	ꛃ	ꛄ	ꛅ	ꛆ	ꛇ	ꛈ	ꛉ	ꛊ	ꛋ	ꛌ	ꛍ	ꛎ	ꛏ
U+A6Dx	ꛐ	ꛑ	ꛒ	ꛓ	ꛔ	ꛕ	ꛖ	ꛗ	ꛘ	ꛙ	ꛚ	ꛛ	ꛜ	ꛝ	ꛞ	ꛟ
U+A6Ex	ꛠ	ꛡ	ꛢ	ꛣ	ꛤ	ꛥ	ꛦ	ꛧ	ꛨ	ꛩ	ꛪ	ꛫ	ꛬ	ꛭ	ꛮ	ꛯ
U+A6Fx	꛰	꛱	꛲	꛳	꛴	꛵	꛶	꛷								
Notes 1.As of Unicode version 18.0 2.Grey areas indicate non-assigned code points

Historical stages of Bamum script were added to Unicode in October, 2010 with the release of version 6.0. These are encoded in the Bamum Supplement block as U+16800–U+16A3F. The various stages of script development are dubbed "Phase-A" to "Phase-E". The character names note the last phase in which they appear. For example, U+168EE 𖣮 BAMUM LETTER PHASE-C PIN is attested through Phase C but not in Phase D.

Bamum Supplement^{[1]}^{[2]} Official Unicode Consortium code chart (PDF)
	0	1	2	3	4	5	6	7	8	9	A	B	C	D	E	F
U+1680x	𖠀	𖠁	𖠂	𖠃	𖠄	𖠅	𖠆	𖠇	𖠈	𖠉	𖠊	𖠋	𖠌	𖠍	𖠎	𖠏
U+1681x	𖠐	𖠑	𖠒	𖠓	𖠔	𖠕	𖠖	𖠗	𖠘	𖠙	𖠚	𖠛	𖠜	𖠝	𖠞	𖠟
U+1682x	𖠠	𖠡	𖠢	𖠣	𖠤	𖠥	𖠦	𖠧	𖠨	𖠩	𖠪	𖠫	𖠬	𖠭	𖠮	𖠯
U+1683x	𖠰	𖠱	𖠲	𖠳	𖠴	𖠵	𖠶	𖠷	𖠸	𖠹	𖠺	𖠻	𖠼	𖠽	𖠾	𖠿
U+1684x	𖡀	𖡁	𖡂	𖡃	𖡄	𖡅	𖡆	𖡇	𖡈	𖡉	𖡊	𖡋	𖡌	𖡍	𖡎	𖡏
U+1685x	𖡐	𖡑	𖡒	𖡓	𖡔	𖡕	𖡖	𖡗	𖡘	𖡙	𖡚	𖡛	𖡜	𖡝	𖡞	𖡟
U+1686x	𖡠	𖡡	𖡢	𖡣	𖡤	𖡥	𖡦	𖡧	𖡨	𖡩	𖡪	𖡫	𖡬	𖡭	𖡮	𖡯
U+1687x	𖡰	𖡱	𖡲	𖡳	𖡴	𖡵	𖡶	𖡷	𖡸	𖡹	𖡺	𖡻	𖡼	𖡽	𖡾	𖡿
U+1688x	𖢀	𖢁	𖢂	𖢃	𖢄	𖢅	𖢆	𖢇	𖢈	𖢉	𖢊	𖢋	𖢌	𖢍	𖢎	𖢏
U+1689x	𖢐	𖢑	𖢒	𖢓	𖢔	𖢕	𖢖	𖢗	𖢘	𖢙	𖢚	𖢛	𖢜	𖢝	𖢞	𖢟
U+168Ax	𖢠	𖢡	𖢢	𖢣	𖢤	𖢥	𖢦	𖢧	𖢨	𖢩	𖢪	𖢫	𖢬	𖢭	𖢮	𖢯
U+168Bx	𖢰	𖢱	𖢲	𖢳	𖢴	𖢵	𖢶	𖢷	𖢸	𖢹	𖢺	𖢻	𖢼	𖢽	𖢾	𖢿
U+168Cx	𖣀	𖣁	𖣂	𖣃	𖣄	𖣅	𖣆	𖣇	𖣈	𖣉	𖣊	𖣋	𖣌	𖣍	𖣎	𖣏
U+168Dx	𖣐	𖣑	𖣒	𖣓	𖣔	𖣕	𖣖	𖣗	𖣘	𖣙	𖣚	𖣛	𖣜	𖣝	𖣞	𖣟
U+168Ex	𖣠	𖣡	𖣢	𖣣	𖣤	𖣥	𖣦	𖣧	𖣨	𖣩	𖣪	𖣫	𖣬	𖣭	𖣮	𖣯
U+168Fx	𖣰	𖣱	𖣲	𖣳	𖣴	𖣵	𖣶	𖣷	𖣸	𖣹	𖣺	𖣻	𖣼	𖣽	𖣾	𖣿
U+1690x	𖤀	𖤁	𖤂	𖤃	𖤄	𖤅	𖤆	𖤇	𖤈	𖤉	𖤊	𖤋	𖤌	𖤍	𖤎	𖤏
U+1691x	𖤐	𖤑	𖤒	𖤓	𖤔	𖤕	𖤖	𖤗	𖤘	𖤙	𖤚	𖤛	𖤜	𖤝	𖤞	𖤟
U+1692x	𖤠	𖤡	𖤢	𖤣	𖤤	𖤥	𖤦	𖤧	𖤨	𖤩	𖤪	𖤫	𖤬	𖤭	𖤮	𖤯
U+1693x	𖤰	𖤱	𖤲	𖤳	𖤴	𖤵	𖤶	𖤷	𖤸	𖤹	𖤺	𖤻	𖤼	𖤽	𖤾	𖤿
U+1694x	𖥀	𖥁	𖥂	𖥃	𖥄	𖥅	𖥆	𖥇	𖥈	𖥉	𖥊	𖥋	𖥌	𖥍	𖥎	𖥏
U+1695x	𖥐	𖥑	𖥒	𖥓	𖥔	𖥕	𖥖	𖥗	𖥘	𖥙	𖥚	𖥛	𖥜	𖥝	𖥞	𖥟
U+1696x	𖥠	𖥡	𖥢	𖥣	𖥤	𖥥	𖥦	𖥧	𖥨	𖥩	𖥪	𖥫	𖥬	𖥭	𖥮	𖥯
U+1697x	𖥰	𖥱	𖥲	𖥳	𖥴	𖥵	𖥶	𖥷	𖥸	𖥹	𖥺	𖥻	𖥼	𖥽	𖥾	𖥿
U+1698x	𖦀	𖦁	𖦂	𖦃	𖦄	𖦅	𖦆	𖦇	𖦈	𖦉	𖦊	𖦋	𖦌	𖦍	𖦎	𖦏
U+1699x	𖦐	𖦑	𖦒	𖦓	𖦔	𖦕	𖦖	𖦗	𖦘	𖦙	𖦚	𖦛	𖦜	𖦝	𖦞	𖦟
U+169Ax	𖦠	𖦡	𖦢	𖦣	𖦤	𖦥	𖦦	𖦧	𖦨	𖦩	𖦪	𖦫	𖦬	𖦭	𖦮	𖦯
U+169Bx	𖦰	𖦱	𖦲	𖦳	𖦴	𖦵	𖦶	𖦷	𖦸	𖦹	𖦺	𖦻	𖦼	𖦽	𖦾	𖦿
U+169Cx	𖧀	𖧁	𖧂	𖧃	𖧄	𖧅	𖧆	𖧇	𖧈	𖧉	𖧊	𖧋	𖧌	𖧍	𖧎	𖧏
U+169Dx	𖧐	𖧑	𖧒	𖧓	𖧔	𖧕	𖧖	𖧗	𖧘	𖧙	𖧚	𖧛	𖧜	𖧝	𖧞	𖧟
U+169Ex	𖧠	𖧡	𖧢	𖧣	𖧤	𖧥	𖧦	𖧧	𖧨	𖧩	𖧪	𖧫	𖧬	𖧭	𖧮	𖧯
U+169Fx	𖧰	𖧱	𖧲	𖧳	𖧴	𖧵	𖧶	𖧷	𖧸	𖧹	𖧺	𖧻	𖧼	𖧽	𖧾	𖧿
U+16A0x	𖨀	𖨁	𖨂	𖨃	𖨄	𖨅	𖨆	𖨇	𖨈	𖨉	𖨊	𖨋	𖨌	𖨍	𖨎	𖨏
U+16A1x	𖨐	𖨑	𖨒	𖨓	𖨔	𖨕	𖨖	𖨗	𖨘	𖨙	𖨚	𖨛	𖨜	𖨝	𖨞	𖨟
U+16A2x	𖨠	𖨡	𖨢	𖨣	𖨤	𖨥	𖨦	𖨧	𖨨	𖨩	𖨪	𖨫	𖨬	𖨭	𖨮	𖨯
U+16A3x	𖨰	𖨱	𖨲	𖨳	𖨴	𖨵	𖨶	𖨷	𖨸							
Notes 1.As of Unicode version 18.0 2.Grey areas indicate non-assigned code points

== Bamum Scripts and Archives Project ==
The Bamum Scripts and Archives Project at the Bamum Palace is engaged in a variety of initiatives concerning the Bamum script, including collecting and photographing threatened documents, translating and in some cases hand-copying documents, creating a fully usable Bamum computer font for the inventory of documents, and creating a safe environment for the preservation and storage of documents.

In 2006, the Bamum Scripts and Archives Project embarked on a project to create the first usable Bamum computer font. In order to do this, the Project examined hundreds of important documents transcribed in the current and most widely employed variant of the Bamum script: A-ka-u-ku (after its first four characters). The goal of the project team was to identify the most prominent forms of the various Bamum characters, as there have been many different styles employed by literates over the years. In particular, the Project examined documents in the script known to have been written by the three most famous Bamum script literates: King Njoya and his colleagues, Nji Mama and Njoya Ibrahimou (younger brother of Nji Mama, also a well known Bamum artist).

== See also ==
- Nji Oumarou Nchare
- Writing systems of Africa
- Africa Alphabet
- African reference alphabet
