= Rabiatou Njoya =

Cameroonian princess and writer (1945–2021)

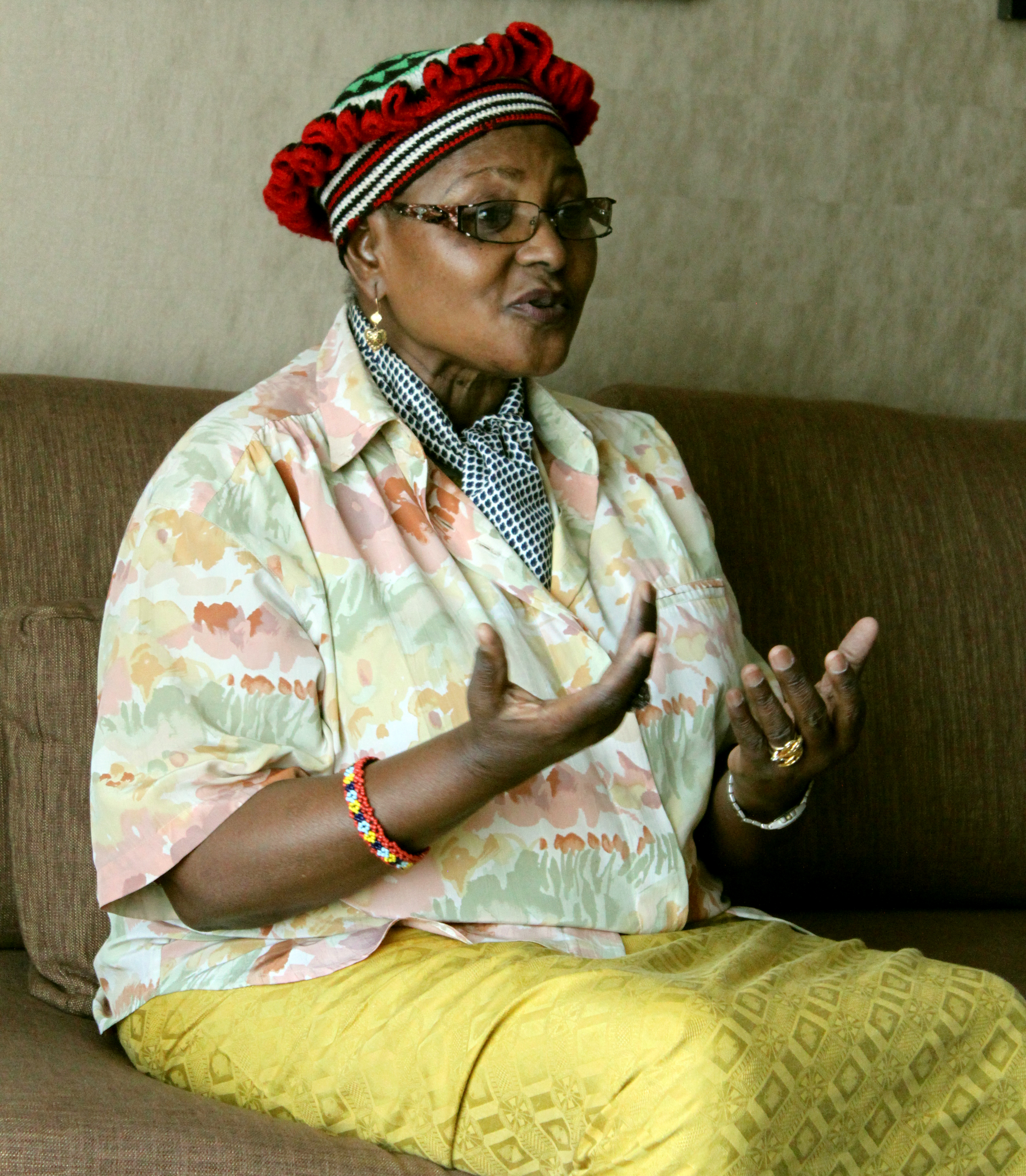
Njoya in 2013

Rabiatou Njoya (15 October 1945 – 9 April 2021) was a Cameroonian princess and writer.

== Early life and education ==
Rabiatou Njoya was born on 15 October 1945, and was the daughter of Seidou Njimoluh Njoya (1902-1992), the Mfon or Sultan of the Kingdom of Bamum from 1933 to 1992. Her brother Ibrahim Mbombo Njoya (1937-2021) succeeded to the throne in 1992 on the death of their father and appointed her as Momafon, an advisor and co-heir of the monarch.

In 1966 she became the first girl from the department of Noun to obtain her Baccalauréat, having studied at the lycée général Leclerc in Yaoundé. She then studied in England and the United States.

== Career ==
From 1981 to 2007 she was director of communications at the Conseil supérieur du sport en Afrique (CSSA).

== Recognition ==
In 1994 she was appointed to the Order of Merit of Cameroon, and in 2006 she was honoured as a knight of the Order of Valour.

== Personal life and death ==
Njoya married Nsangou Mama in 1985.

Rabiatou Njoya died in Foumban on 9 April 2021, after an illness.
