= Njoya =

Njoya may refer to:

- Ibrahim Njoya (1870–1933), ruled the Bamum people of Cameroon from 1885 until 1931, an intellectual, builder and inventor
- Seidou Njimoluh Njoya (1902–1992), ruled the Bamum people of Cameroon from 1933 to 1992
- Adamou Ndam Njoya (1942–2020), Cameroonian lawyer, author, professor, politician, and former presidential candidate
- Rabiatou Njoya (1945-2021), Cameroonian princess and writer
