= Foumban Royal Palace =

Historic building in Foumban, Cameroon

Coordinates: 5.733044°N 10.901154°E

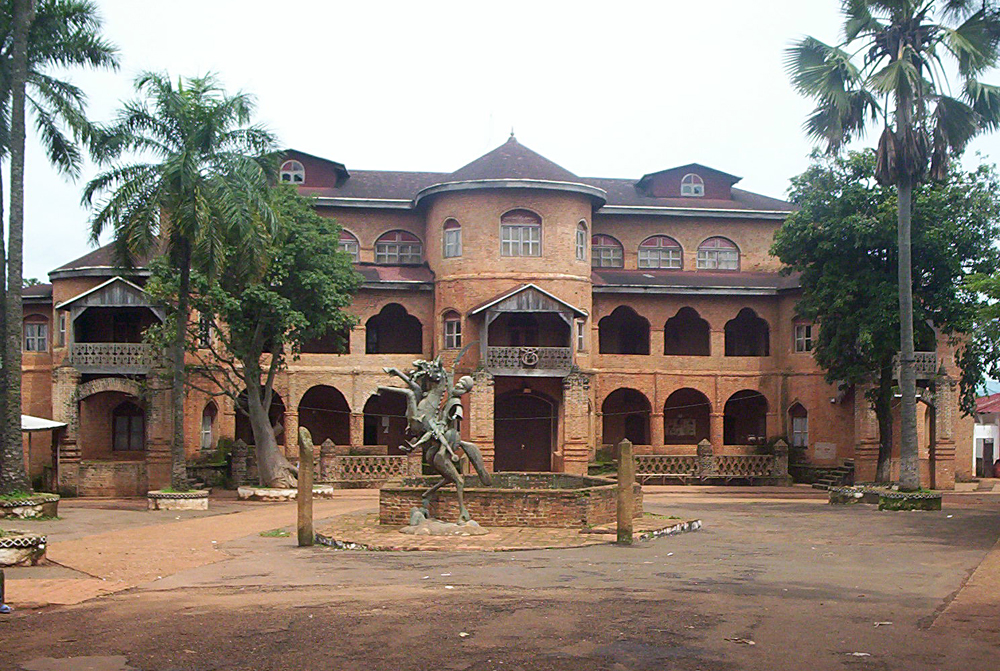
Foumban Royal Palace built by King Ibrahim Njoya in 1917

The Foumban Royal Palace is a historical building in the city of Foumban, capital of Noun. It is the seat of the Kingdom of Bamum, where the Chief-Superior of the peoples of the valley of the East bank of the Noun resides.

The royal palace of Foumban, where the king of the Bamum still resides today, was built in 1917. The Palace Museum tells the history of the dynasty of the Bamum kings from 1394 to the present day, with information on the most famous of the Bamum kings, Ibrahim Njoya, who died in 1933 and who created a writing system at the end of the 19th century called Bamum script.

== Bibliography ==
- Christraud M. Geary, The Things of the Palace: Catalog of the Bamoum Palace Museum in Foumban, Franz Steiner Verlag, Wiesbaden, 1984
- Adamou Ndam Njoya, The palace of Foumban: a masterpiece of art and architecture, Editions Ndam and Raynier, Yaounde, Foumban, 1975, 48 p.

== See also ==
- Kingdom of Bamum
- Foumban
- Bamum people
- Ibrahim Njoya
- Bamum language
