= Nchare Yen =

Founder of the Kingdom of Bamum

King Nchare Yen
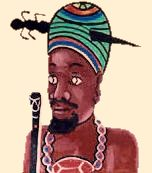
- A painting of Nchare Yen

Mfon of the Bamun
- In office 1394–1418
- Preceded by: Position established
- Succeeded by: Ngouopou

Personal details
- Born: c. 1370
- Died: 1418

Military service
- Allegiance: Kingdom of Bamum

Nchare Yen (Note: Pronounced /nʃɑːʔrə jən/), also referred to simply as Nchare, or by the English styling of the name as Nshare Yen, or just Nshare (Note: The different spelling in the name revolves around the transcription of the sound /ʃ/, which is written in French as ⟨ch⟩ and in English as ⟨sh⟩) (c. 1370 - 1418), was the founder of the Kingdom of Bamum, and one of the four kings who are mainly worshiped in the traditional Bamum religion due to their achievements in the Bamum society and culture. Nchare Yen is the brother of Ngon Nso, the founder of the Kingdom of Nso. Nchare Yen was the son of an unknown Tikar chief, who he and his sister broke away from to establish their own kingdoms. According to the book Rock of God, which discusses Nso's history,

Nso and Bamoun had been constantly quibbling, and to many, this seemed to be mostly sibling rivalry than any unavoidable conflict. Since Nso was founded by the sister (Ngon Nso), the brother (Nchare-Yen, founder of Bamoum) always saw himself as the successor to the throne of Nso, according to the Tikar tradition that they both knew and respected.

According to one of the former leaders of the Bamum, Seidou Njimoluh Njoya, in a 1977 interview, described Nchare Yen as being a "short man with a protuberant stomach", who was "dark in complexion, had short limbs, but was very courageous", and also "loved dancing and drinking palm wine [but was] said to have been very charitable." Most of what is known about Nchare Yen has been passed down from both historical, religious, and cultural sources in Bamum society, and due to the obscurity of the subject matter, there is very little in the way of evidence to verify the claims given about the events of Nchare Yen's life.

== Notes ==
Preceded by Position established	Sultan of Fumban; Mfon of the Bamun; 1394-1418	Succeeded by Ngouopou
