= Ibrahim Njoya =

Mfon of the Bamum (r. 1886/7–1933)

Ibrahim Njoya ꚩꚫꛑꚩꚳ ꚳ꛰ꛀꚧꚩꛂ 𖦊𖧏𖣙
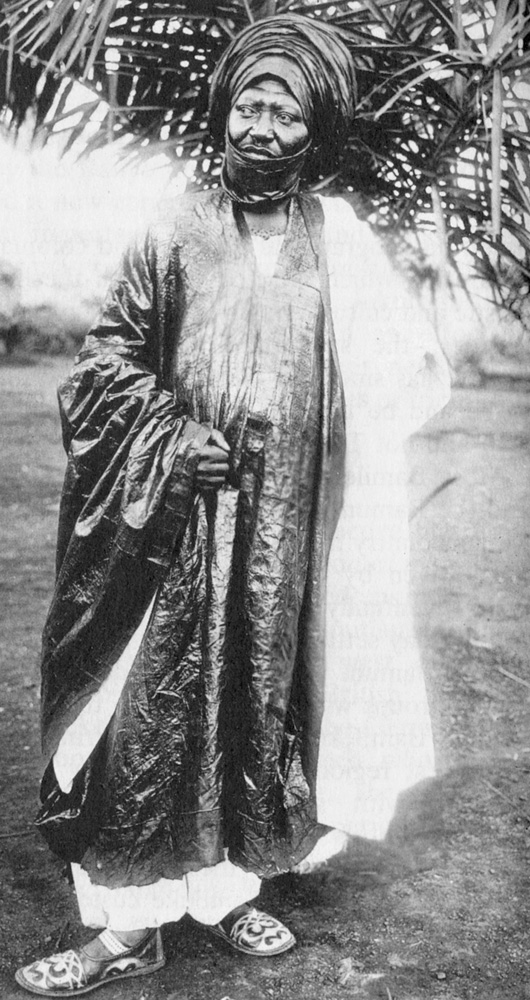

Mfon of the Bamum
- Reign: c. 1886 or 1887–1933
- Predecessor: Nsangou
- Successor: Seidou Njimoluh Njoya
- Born: c. 1860
- Died: c. 1933 (aged 72–73); Yaoundé, French Cameroon
- Spouse: ~1,200 concurrent wives
- Issue: ~350 children

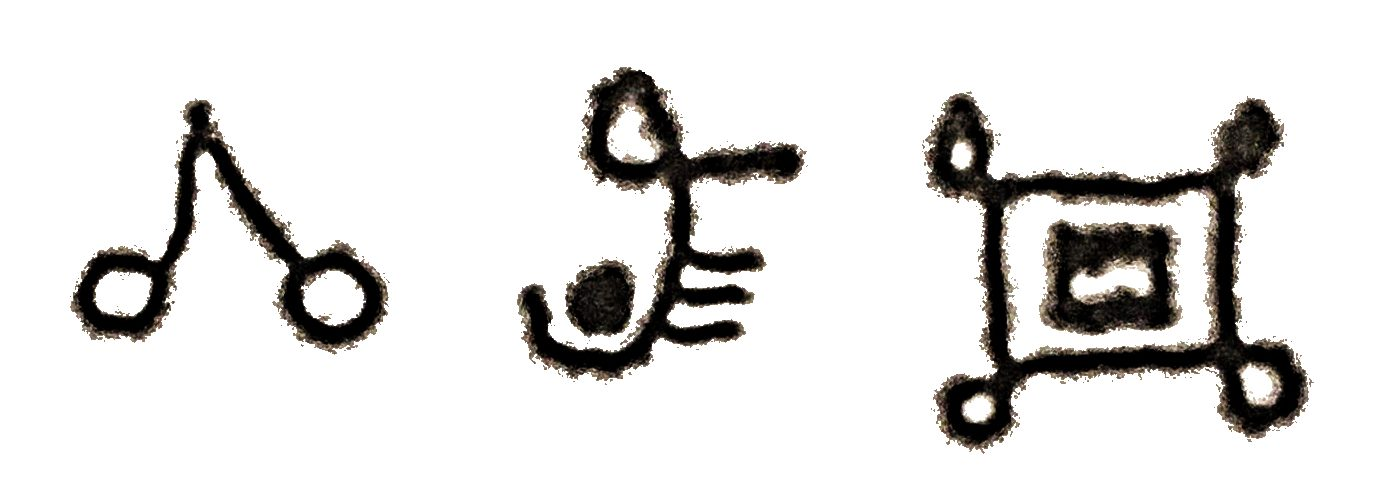
Ibrahim Njoya (Note: Bamun: ꚩꚫꛑꚩꚳ ꚳ꛰ꛀꚧꚩꛂ, romanized: Iparəim Nʃuɔiya, formerly written as 𖦊𖧏𖣙. Also Germanicised as Njoja.) (c. 1860–1933) was the seventeenth sultan of the Kingdom of Bamum, a monarchy in western Cameroon dating back to the fourteenth century. He succeeded his father Nsangu, and ruled from 1886 or 1887 until his death in 1933, when he was succeeded by his son, Seidou Njimoluh Njoya. He ruled from the ancient walled city of Fumban.

Njoya was a neographer, having invented the Bamum syllabary and Shümom language.

== Person and life ==
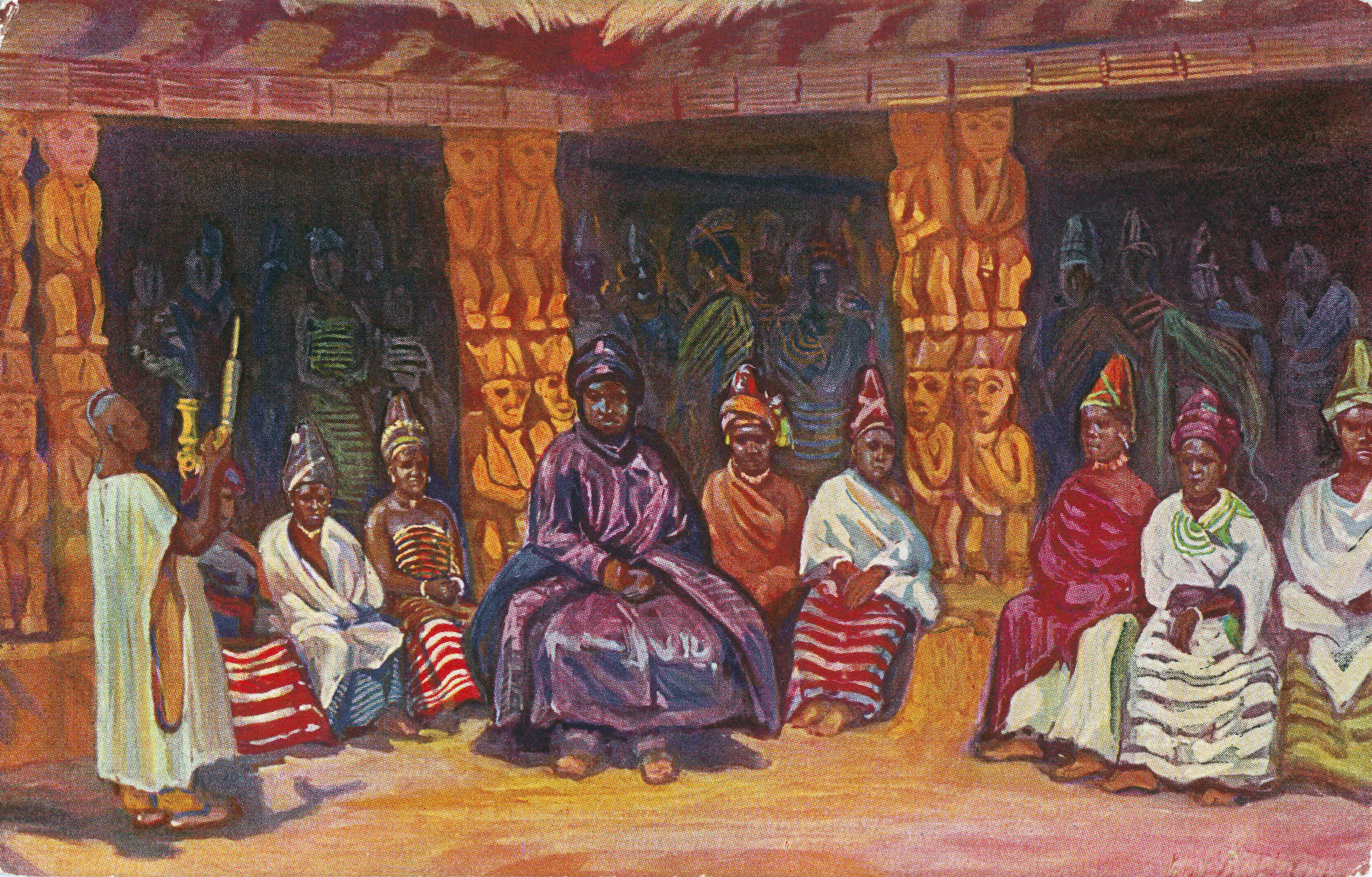
A painting of King Njoya and his wives

When Njoya was born, the Kingdom of Bamum was in external conflict with the Fulani and internal division amongst the royal family. His father, King Nsangu, was known in the region as a warrior and ultimately died in a battle against the Nso in 1888. Njoya's mother acted as regent and ruled the kingdom until he came of age and could ascend the throne in 1895.

Njoya descended from a dynastic line going back to Mfon Ncharé, who founded Bamum in the year 1394. Ncharé was the son of the Tikar royals princess Yen and Mforifum (also called Mvétam). Yen was a direct descendant of Prince Mbum of Ngan Ha as well as Essedi, a merchant who, according to Njoya's historical written testimony, was an Egyptian. Genealogical analysis shows that Essedi, the patriarch of Bamum, was the great grandson of Ajara, the founder of the Mandara lineage. Numerous scholars have interpreted this literary narrative as a historical inference speaking to the roots of the Bamum and Tikar along the Nile River in what is now Sudan.

Njoya also detailed a long history of political skirmishes between the Bamileke and Bamum. As a result of the military expeditions of Njoya's ancestor Ncharé, the founder of the Bamum, the majority of modern Bamiléké people have Bamum paternal ancestors. A study by Bird et al. shows that the Bamum and the Bamileke have the lowest inferred within-group IBD sharing. This indicates a lack of endogamy. The Kingdom of Bamum was reported to be the largest in the Grassfields, and known for both fighting and trading with neighboring groups. These interactions may have acted to reduce genetic isolation in the Bamum.

Colonel Gorges of the British Army, who met Njoya in 1914, described him as "a fine upstanding man." He practised polygamy; Gorges reported that he had 600 wives and 149 children by 1915. It is thought that he had 177 children in all. Two other sources, including Images from Bamum. German Colonial Photography at the Court of King Njoya, Cameroon, West Africa, 1902-1915 by Christraud M. Geary and a text by Kristian Kristiansen and Michael Rowlands, claim that he had 1,200 wives and concubines and 350 children in total.

Under the influence of a German missionary, Njoya converted to Christianity. He later created a new syncretistic religion based on Christianity and traditional Bamum religion before converting to Islam along with much of his court in 1916. He accepted the authority of the Sokoto Caliph, requesting the caliph to send him an emir's flag and Muslim teachers.

== Rule ==
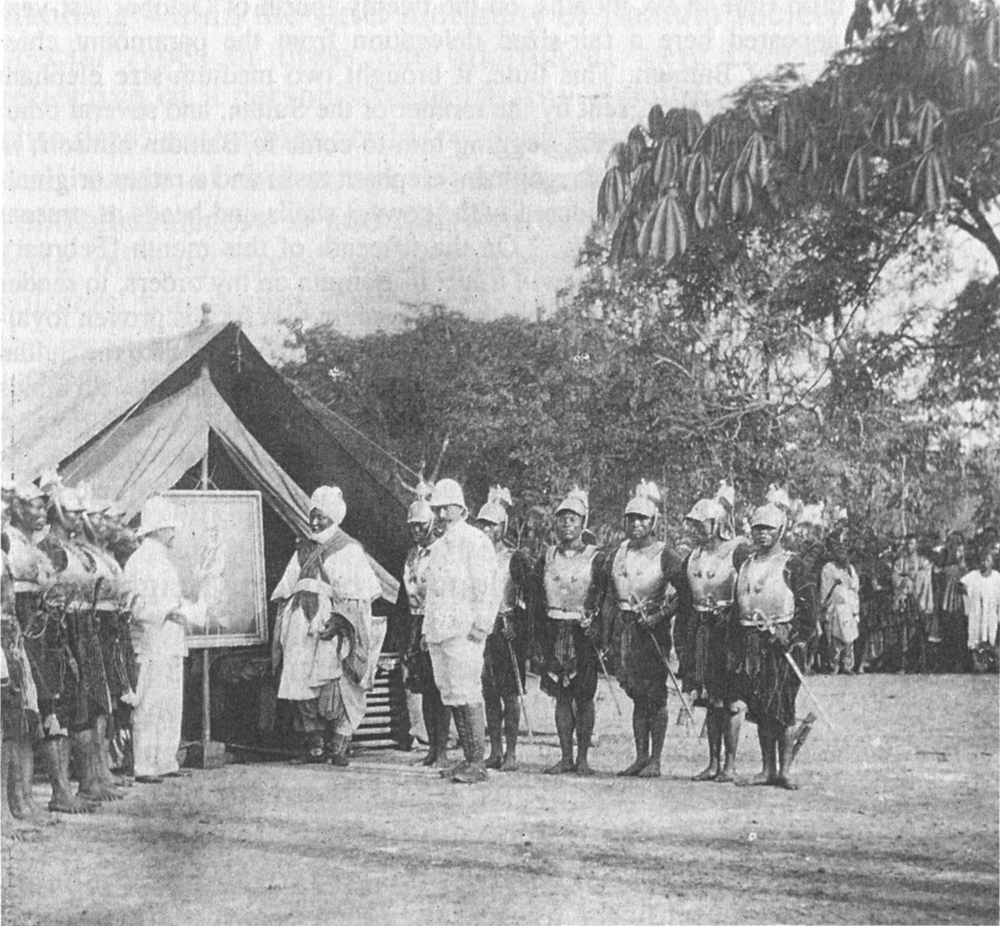
King Njoya of Bamum receiving an oil painting of Emperor Wilhelm II. The gift was in return for his support in the German campaign against the Nso'.

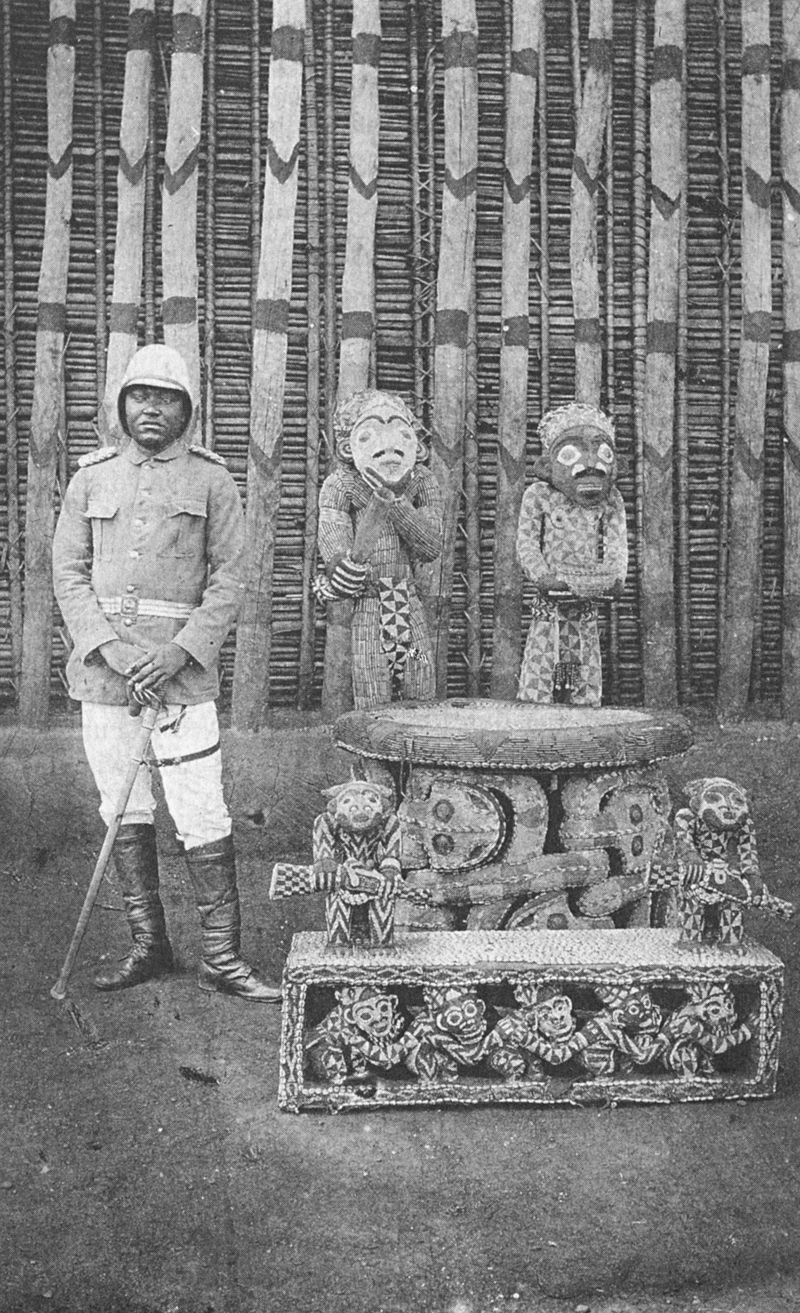
The throne of King Njoya, Mandu Yenu

Njoya's mother, Njapdunke, acted as regent until he reached majority. His official rule was further delayed because his father's head was held by an old adversary, the Nso people (the head or skull of an ancestor is of ceremonial importance to the Bamum.) The Germans helped him in recovering the head and this, along with his relative independence under German rule, caused him to have generally good relations with them.

German legal scholar Christian Bommarius has refuted the claim that Mfon Njoya betrayed Rudolph Manga Bell's resistance proposal against the Germans. This claim originated from German colonial officials who sought to incriminate Manga Bell for resisting their attempts to seize Duala land.

He greeted the Germans with great celebrations in his residence in Foumban, which soon brought him the title of an official figure-holder of the German colonial government. King Njoya tried to maintain a good relationship with the German Empire during his lifetime. On the birthday of Emperor Wilhelm II, Njoya gave him the physical throne of Buea. This put Njoya in the Kaiser's favor, and enabled Felix von Luschan, director of the Berlin Museum of Ethnology, to exhibit the throne, which had been imprinted with dyed pearls in great skill. To this day the throne can still be seen in the Berlin Ethnological Museum. In return Wilhelm II sent for his "royal brother" a cuirassier uniform of the German Imperial Guard. Along with an oil painting of Wilhelm II, the uniform is now exhibited in the Palace Museum at Foumban.

Njoya set up schools that taught Bamum as a literary language via the new script introduced by Njoya, as well as basic German.

Col. Gorges noted in 1914 that he held court or durbar daily outside the gatehouse for the dispensing of justice and receipt of tribute, and that all his people had access to him. There was a well-defined code of court etiquette observed:

"Any courtier wishing to speak to him assumes a cringing attitude, removes his skull-cap, clasps his hands and, taking a chukker round behind the presence, finally arrives at the royal elbow. Here he averts his head and makes his request in a hoarse whisper. When the king coughs or clears his throat everyone present softly claps his hands."

According to historian Stephanie Michel the relationship between the Bamum and the Germans was complex and did not fit neatly into a simplistic Africa-Europe, metropolis-periphery dichotomy. Njoya was not a subordinate in his dealings with the Germans. According to History and Customs of the Bamum:

"The Germans did good for Njoya. They left him the power to govern all the country of Bamum. As long as he governed the country, there was no disorder either among the whites or among the Bamum."

Njoya maintained practical independence by using poses, symbols, and styles that he had learned in the contact zone applied to his Bamum regalia. Here all of the highest symbols reserved by whites were taken over by Africans. This represented an insecurity in the colonial objectives of the Germans. The usage of military uniforms by Africans was a common practice that can also be seen among the Herero of Namibia and the Beni Ngoma of Tanzania.

Though the Germans were at the center of Njoya's diplomatic and political efforts from 1904-1909, he nonetheless also oriented himself towards the Fulbe and Islam. Njoya abandoned the German style abruptly in 1909 due to some disappointing political results of engagement with them. By 1912 the Bamum turned away from the Germans and aligned themselves with the Fulbe.

In 1916, the French had taken control of German Cameroon, and the Kingdom of Bamum lost its partial autonomy. Since Njoya resided in Foumban until 1931, despite his formal abolition by France, he had, de facto, retained the role of king. In 1931, he was sent to Yaoundé, where he died two years later in 1933 at the age of 66. His successor was Seidou Njimoluh Njoya.

== Architecture ==
After the original Foumban palace was burned down in 1913, Njoya embarked on the design and construction of the current one.

The architectural systems of the Bamun feature many of the prominent elements of African architecture in their vaulted roofs with ventilation, framed opening molding, projecting sills, adobe bricks, bioenvironmental mimicry, and fractal proxemics.

Njoya was exposed to a variety of architectural and building traditions during his childhood and early years of reign from his own travels, encounters with external merchants as well as his reading of Ajami texts. He encountered Hausa traditional homes, the Mousgoum teleuk in Northern Cameroon, as well as the Ssola Somolo and Batammaliba Tata Somba building systems of northern Togo and Burkina Faso. A combination of these unique structural forms contributed to the development of the new Foumban Palace. Many of the German ethnographers were quite impressed with the new Palace and thought that Njoya must have copied the building style of the europeans. The problem with this assumption is that prominent indigenous elements are identified in the new structure such as encircling verandahs, deep eaves, carved wood posts, raffia palm formwork, and laterite clay bricks.

According to Marie Thorbecke:

"The way in which the brown wood walls of the upper floor rise out of the white plaster of the stone wall bellow attests to a natural instinct that the negro could never ever learn form whites, an instinct that lies in his blood through the inheritance of generations."

Mfon Njoya affirmed that the design of the Foumban Palace had been the result of his own ingenuity and structural engineering expertise. According to Njoya:

"Long ago, King Njoya built behind the palace a more beautiful dwelling than any that existed. It looked like a white house; however the king had not yet seen any of their houses when he built them. He himself had imagined the way to build it. The terracing was high. It was built with bricks, the ceiling was covered with earth and on this ceiling another room was built. The roof was of mats. This dwelling was named Nkue-yam. The ladder that allowed access to the upper room was so well made that you didn't feel like you were climbing a ladder when going to the upper floor. An outside staircase gave access to the first room and from this one went to the upper floor. The floor on the ground floor was so well done that you would have thought it was not made of earth. It was in the upper room that the king spent the night. It was beautifully decorated. The walls were covered with fabrics, the floor was covered with mats; the hearth was coated with a kind of varnish, the veranda which surrounded this room was also covered with mats. Two metal pipes connected the first floor and the ground floor, one was for the water, the other for the wine; a long string ran from top to bottom. Every morning water was poured into one of these pipes and the servants who spent the night on the ground floor came there to take the water necessary for their toilet. When the king wanted to give wine to the servants, he had it poured into the other pipe, and they came to fill their ndut (drinking vessel) without seeing the one doing the service."

== Writing system ==
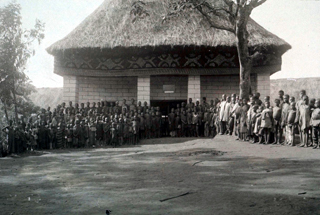
The Bamum School of King Njoya in a photograph taken in Foumban in 1910

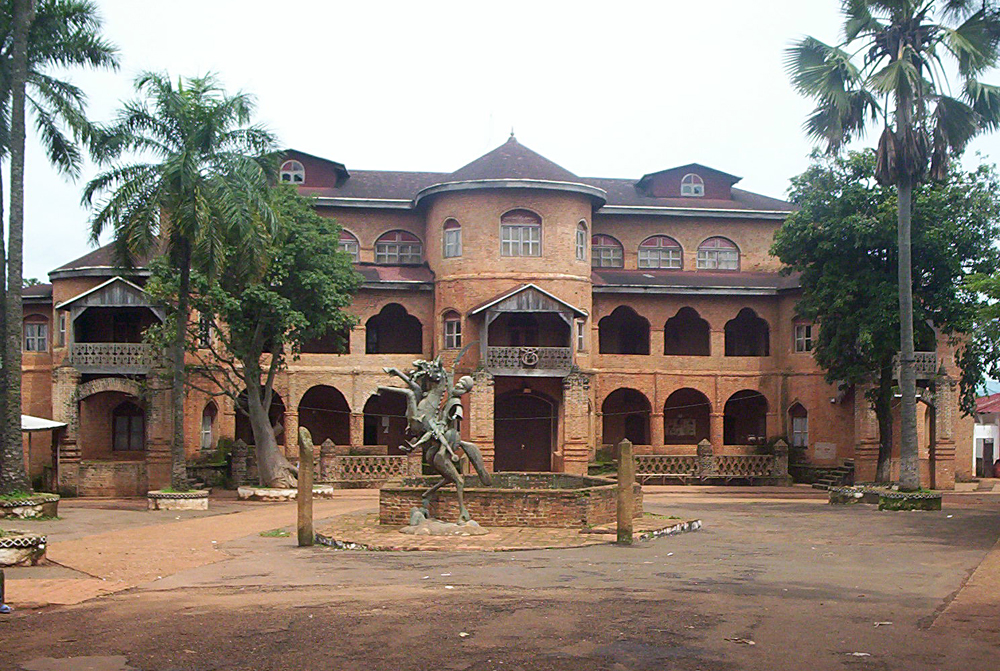
Palace built by King Ibrahim Njoya in 1917

Njoya came to power in a tumultuous time. His father Mfon Nsangu had recently been assassinated in a war with the Nso and his mother Njapdunke served as a regent until he was prepared for the position of mfon. During his early days as a ruler he had encountered many neighboring African peoples and witnessed the effects of colonization and illegal human trafficking in Africa. Understanding this existential threat, at the turn of the 20th century he embarked on a mission to modernize the Lerewa picto phonographic glyphs into a syllabary to preserve the history of the Bamum.

The evolution of the glyphs went from 700 signs to 510 signs with 10 arithmetic digits and punctuation. This stage was called Lerewa. Lerewa is a logographic system of which 80% is composed pictograms representing everyday objects in nature, plants and parts of the human body and the other 20% composed of ideograms and phonograms, representing abstract ideas and sounds respectively. This early form of writing was written from left to right, right to left, top to bottom and bottom to top on clay and wooden tabs as well as animal skins using charcoal. Both hieroglyphs and Lerewa contain two basic elements picto ideograms and phonograms. Most words feature a combination of the two signs.

The next phase of writing developed between 1899 and 1901 was called mbima which means mixture in Bamum. It included 439 characters including 10 arithmetic one punctuation, elimination of 116 signs that didn't satisfy Njoya and the introduction of 45 characters to overcome phonetic short comings. Like Lerewa, Mbima is a logographic system where pictograms dominate over ideograms.

In the beginning of 1902 the third iteration of the Bamum script Nyi Nyi Fa Fu (which means God has given grace) was created. Nyi Nyi Fa Fu is reduced by 56 characters down to 381, including 10 arithmetic digits and two punctuation marks. Here Ideograms are made primary over pictograms and Left to right writing was mandated, resulting in an expansion of literary activity, numerous correspondences and property transactions.

In 1903 Njoya built schools to teach the writing and also began translating scriptural texts.

The fourth phase of the Bamum script came in 1907 with Ri Nyi Fa Fu. This script had only 286 characters, 10 numbers and 2 punctuations with the logograms simplified.

The fifth iteration of the script Ri Nyi Fu Fen began a year after the development of the last stage and represents the last logographic step of the alphabet. It contains 81 characters less with 205 symbols. This stage totally eliminated pictograms in favor of ideograms and syllables.

In February 1910 Njoya completed the process of going from a picto-syllabic system to the syllabo-graphemic system in the development of Akauku. Akauku has 83 characters, 70 graphemes, 10 arithmetic digits and three diacritics. Akauku Mfemfe has 91 characters, 70 syllabo graphemic characters, 10 arithmetic figures, three diacritics, three punctuation marks, and five arithmetic marks.

In about 15 years through and five successive stages, the end result was Akauku Mfemfe and this allowed the Bamum to produce maps, birth certificates, construction blue prints, administration documents, court acts, accountings and historical archives.

Njoya may have also invented a hand-powered mill for grinding corn and other cereals.

After launching the project in the 1980s, his grandson, who served as the traditional King of the Bamum until 2021, Ibrahim Mbombo Njoya continued transforming the palace into a museum, where schoolchildren learn the Bamum script developed by Ibrahim Njoya.

== See also ==
- Bamum people
- Bamum kingdom
- List of Cameroonian artists

== Notes ==
Preceded by Nsangou	Sultan of Fumban; Mfon of the Bamun; 1886-1933	Succeeded by Seidou Njimoluh Njoya
