= Bamum language =

Benue–Congo language spoken in Cameroon

Bamum
- Shüpamom
- ꚶꛉ꛰꛲ꚫꛦꚳ
- Region: Cameroon, Nigeria
- Ethnicity: Bamum people
- Native speakers: 600,000 (2022)
- Language family: Niger–Congo?: Atlantic–Congo; Volta-Congo; Benue–Congo; Bantoid; Southern Bantoid; Grassfields; Eastern Grassfields; Mbam-Nkam; Nun; Bamum
- Dialects: Bapi
- Writing system: Latin script, Bamum syllabary (being revived)

Language codes
- ISO 639-3: bax
- Glottolog: bamu1253
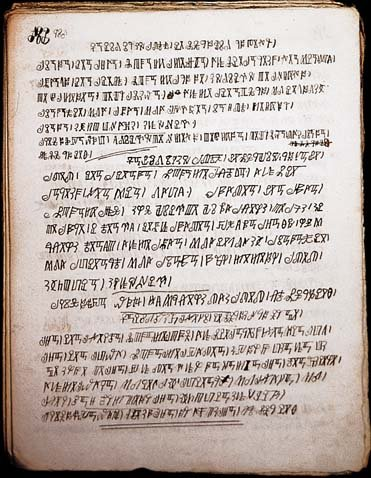
- Page from a manuscript in the Bamum script

Bamum (Shü Pamom [ʃŷpǎˑmə̀m] 'language of the Bamum', or Shümom 'Mum language'), also known as Shupamem, Bamun, or Bamoun, is an Eastern Grassfields language of Cameroon, with approximately 600,000-700,000 speakers in 2025. The language is well known for its original script developed by King Njoya and his palace circle in the Kingdom of Bamum around 1895. Cameroonian musician Claude Ndam was a native speaker of the language and sang it in his music.

== Phonology ==
Bamum has tone, vowel length, diphthongs and coda consonants.

=== Vowels ===
Nchare claims ten monophthongs, only eight of which (excluding /ɔ/ and /o/) have a length distinction. Matateyou shows short and long examples of all ten vowel qualities. The orthography in angle brackets is based on the General Alphabet of Cameroon Languages as used by Matateyou.

	Front		Central	Back	
	Unrounded	Rounded	Unrounded	Unrounded	Rounded
Close	i ⟨i⟩ iː ⟨ii⟩	y ⟨ü⟩ yː ⟨üü⟩		ɯ ⟨ʉ⟩ ɯː ⟨ʉʉ⟩	u ⟨u⟩ uː ⟨uu⟩
Mid	e ⟨e⟩ eː ⟨ee⟩		ə ⟨ə⟩ əː ⟨əə⟩		o ⟨o⟩ oː ⟨oo⟩
Open-mid	ɛ ⟨ɛ⟩ ɛː ⟨ɛɛ⟩				ɔ ⟨ɔ⟩ ɔː ⟨ɔɔ⟩
Open			a ⟨a⟩ a ⟨aa⟩		

=== Consonants ===
The consonants are displayed as following:

			Labial		Alveolar	Palatal	Velar	Labial- velar	Glottal
Plosive	Plain	Voiceless	p ⟨p⟩		t ⟨t⟩		k ⟨k⟩	k͡p ⟨kp⟩	ʔ ⟨ʼ⟩ (Note: allophone of /k/ in coda)
Plosive	Plain	Voiced	b ⟨b⟩ (Note: allophone of /p/)		d ⟨d⟩ (Note: allophone of /l/)		ɡ ⟨g⟩ (Note: allophone of /ɣ/)	g͡b ⟨gb⟩	
Plosive	Prenasal	Voiceless	ᵐp ⟨mp⟩		ⁿt ⟨nt⟩		ᵑk ⟨ŋk⟩	ᵑ͡ᵐk͡p ⟨ŋkp⟩	
Plosive	Prenasal	Voiced	ᵐb ⟨mb⟩		ⁿd ⟨nd⟩		ᵑɡ ⟨ŋg⟩	ᵑ͡ᵐg͡b ⟨ŋgb⟩	
Fricative	Plain	Voiceless	f ⟨f⟩		s ⟨s⟩	ʃ ⟨sh⟩			
Fricative	Plain	Voiced	β ⟨ɓ⟩ (Note: Matateyou uses the letter for implosive /ɓ/)	v ⟨v⟩	z ⟨z⟩ (Note: allophone of /r/)	ʒ ⟨j⟩ (Note: allophone of /j/)	ɣ ⟨gh⟩		
Fricative	Prenasal	Voiceless	ᶬf ⟨mf⟩		ⁿs ⟨ns⟩	ᶮʃ ⟨nsh⟩			
Fricative	Prenasal	Voiced	ᶬv ⟨mv⟩		ⁿz ⟨nz⟩	ᶮʒ ⟨nzh⟩			
Nasal			m ⟨m⟩		n ⟨n⟩	ɲ ⟨ny⟩	ŋ ⟨ŋ⟩	ŋ͡m ⟨ŋm⟩	
Rhotic					r ⟨r⟩				
Approximant	Plain				l ⟨l⟩	j ⟨y⟩		w ⟨w⟩	
Approximant	Prenasal					ⁿj ⟨nj⟩		ⁿw ⟨nw⟩	

=== Tones ===
Bamum has four or five tones. Mateteyou's analysis includes a mid tone, while Nchare's analysis includes downstep. Bamum distinguishes between lexical and grammatical tone.

Diacritic	Nchare	Matateyou
à	low	low
á	high	high
ā	―	mid
ǎ	rising	rising
â	falling	falling
ꜜ	downstep	―

== Bibliography ==
- Matateyou, Emmanuel (2002). Parlons Bamoun. Paris: L'Harmattan. p. 38.
- Nchare, Abdoulaye Laziz (2012). The Grammar of Shupamem (PhD dissertation). New York University. ProQuest 996252918.
- Pawou Molu, Solange (2018). Problèmes de morphophonologie nominale en Bamun-Shüpamom (PhD dissertation). Paris Cité University.
