= Seidou Njimoluh Njoya =

Cameroonian traditional ruler (1902–1992)

Seidou Njimoluh Njoya 𖡚 ꛆꛦꚮ꛰ ꛆꚧꛂ
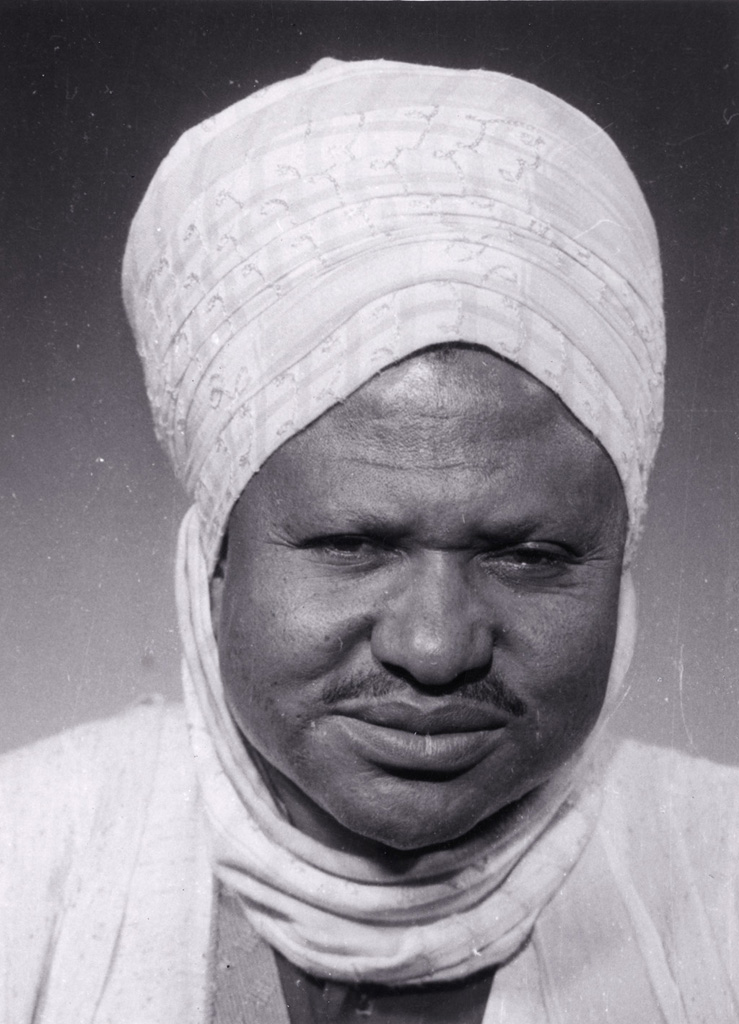
- Njoya c. 1940

Mfon of the Bamum
- Reign: June 1933 – 28 July 1992
- Predecessor: Ibrahim Njoya
- Successor: Ibrahim Mbombo Njoya
- Born: c. 1902
- Died: 28 July 1992 (aged 89–90)

Seidou Njimoluh Njoya (Bamun: 𖡚 ꛆꛦꚮ꛰ ꛆꚧꛂ, romanized: Sɛt-tu Nʒemɔleʔ Nʒeɔya; 1902 – 28 July 1992) was a Cameroonian traditional ruler who served as Mfon of the Bamum from 1933 to 1992. Njimoluh was the son of Ibrahim Njoya, and he was educated in French, English, and the Bamum script developed by his father. In 1931, in order to break the power of the Bamun, French administrators had exiled Ibrahim Njoya to Yaoundé. The Bamum nobles had been scattered due to French rule, but they eventually chose Njimoluh from among Ibrahim Njoya's 177 children and reached an agreement with the French authorities. Seidou Njimoluh Njoya became the 18th mfon of the Bamum in June 1933 after the death of his father.

Njoya later served in the and Cameroonian assembly, both during the colonial and post-colonial periods. Njimoluh was a patron of the arts and worked to preserve Bamun culture. After the French left in 1960, he restored the sacred Bamun idols to the Royal Palace, establishing a museum. He was a devout Muslim and was married to Noh Lantana. Njimoluh was succeeded by his son Ibrahim Mbombo Njoya.

Preceded by Ibrahim Njoya	Sultan of Fumban; Mfon of the Bamun; 1933–1992	Succeeded by Ibrahim Mbombo Njoya
