= Shümom language =

Artificial language created by Sultan Ibrahim Njoya

Shümom
- Created by: Sultan Ibrahim Njoya
- Purpose: Constructed language: Shümom

Language codes
- ISO 639-3: –

The Shümom language is an artificial language created by Sultan Ibrahim Njoya. It was developed as a secret language for the use of palace officials, employing a random mix of words from French, English, and German. Each word was assigned a new meaning to create a secret code.

Shümom can be written in the Bamum or Shüpamom script.
