= Bamum people =

Grassfields ethnic group of Cameroon

Bamum ꚫꛣꚧꚳ
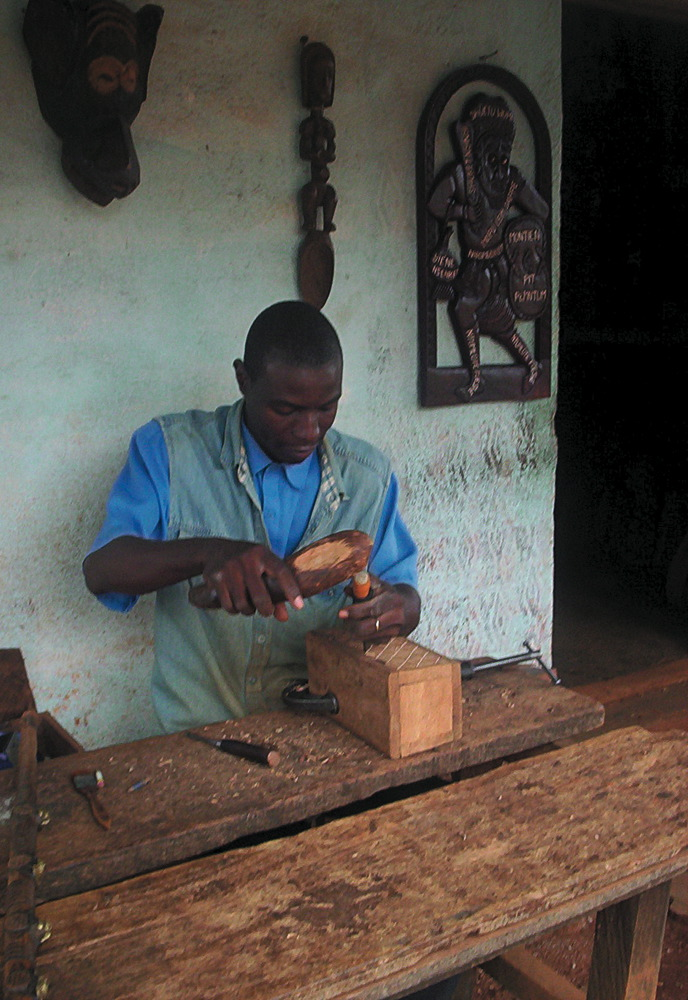
- Bamum artisan at work in Foumban

Total population
- 420,000

Regions with significant populations
- Cameroon

Languages
- Bamum

Religion
- Islam

Related ethnic groups
- Tikar people, Nso people, Bamileke people, Bafia people, Grassfields peoples

The Bamum, sometimes called Bamoum, Bamun, Bamoun, or Mum, are a Grassfields ethnic group located in Cameroon. In 2018, the Bamum and Bamileke peoples accounted for about 24% of the country's population. The Kingdom of Bamum covers approximately 7,300 km. The Kingdom of Bamum was surrounded to the north by the territory of Cameroon, from the west and south-west the kingdom's boundary touches the River Nun while the Rivers Mape and the Mbam surround it to the east.

Climate in the Kingdom consists of two seasons: a long rainy season, and a short dry season. This is mainly due to its location between a forest zone in the south and a tropical savannah grassland in the north. The length of the two seasons last for irregular time lengths.

== Demography ==
Most Bamum live in western Cameroon. As of 2018, the Bamum and Bamileke peoples accounted for about 24% of the country's population. The total population of the Bamum was nearly 500,000 according to a 2013 estimate.

== Political structure ==
The Bamum political activities centered around the king and the king's palace. The palace was structured around the officers of the king and the people that wished to visit the king. This led to the capital of the Bamum Kingdom forming, Foumban. The surrounding villages then worshiped and followed the king as their leader.

As the kingdom developed slowly over the years, a main factor of society was the agricultural farms near the villages. This created an environment of cooperative ideology, through teamwork when it came to handling the work on the farms. Slaves and war captives were used to supply a labor force for farms of kingdom officials and other title holders.

== Culture ==
=== Religion ===
The Bamum traditional religion placed great emphasis on ancestral spirits which were embodied in the skulls of the deceased ancestors. The eldest males of each lineage had possession of the skulls of deceased males. When moving a diviner must find an appropriate place to hold the skull. Despite these efforts some men's skulls remained unclaimed and their spirits are deemed restless. Ceremonies are thus done to placate these spirits. There is also respect for female skulls, but the details are less documented.

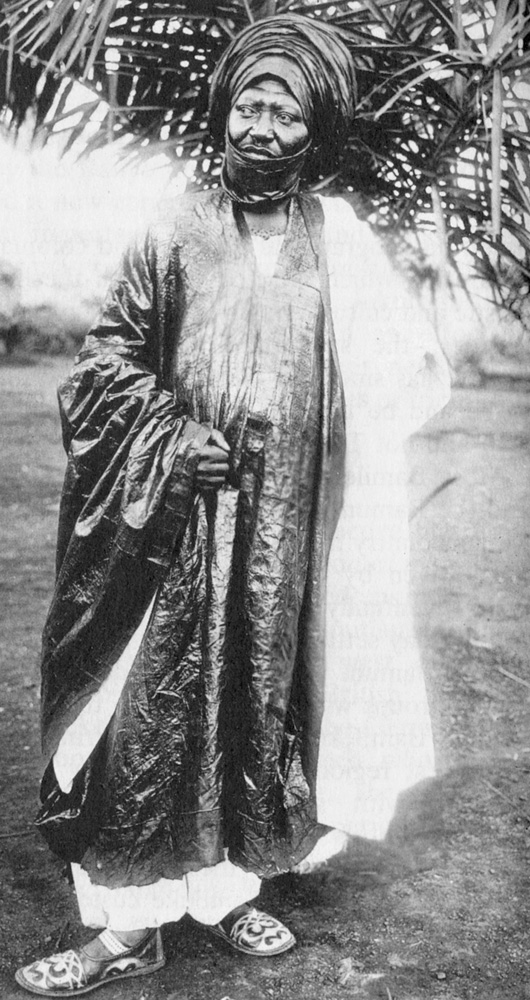
Sultan Ibrahim Njoya.

They also believed women made the soil fruitful, thus women did the planting and harvesting. Masks and representations of the head also had importance. In modern times, most Bamum are Muslim. King Ibrahim Njoya himself converted to Islam then to Christianity and then back to Islam after the Treaty of Versailles. He is said to have disliked abstaining from polygamy when Christian, and from alcohol when Muslim, so ultimately split the difference toward the end.

=== Economy ===
Most Bamum are farmers and some engage in metalworking, woodworking, leather crafting, embroidery or ivory carving.

== Written script, "A-ku-u-ku" ==
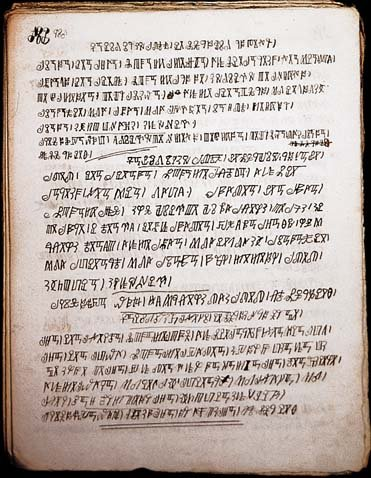
Bamoun text from 1910

Bamum language (Shüpamom, [ʃypaˑmɔm], "language Bamum"; in the French tradition spelled Bamoun) is one of the Benue–Congo languages of Cameroon, with approximately 215,000 speakers. The language is particularly well known for its original phonetic script, developed by Sultan Njoya and his palace circle around 1895. The development of the script spanned ideographic to syllabic systems, with the script's final and most prominent form known as "A-ka-u-ku."

According to oral history, Sultan Ibrahim Njoya had a dream during the 1890s that inspired him to create a written language. In this dream, he was told to draw an image of a hand on a rock slate then wash it off and drink the water. Taking this dream, he gathered his officers and instructed them to draw symbols for any objects they noticed over some time. This resulted in the earliest form of written language in the Bamum community. Njoya spent the next few decades perfecting the script and teaching his officials. His teachings, allowed over 1,000 subjects at that time to become literate.

During the time of reforming his script, there was political concern with surrounding villages and colonial conquests in the area. Njoya believed creating secure and sustainable communication between him and his officials was important. At first, alongside the creation of his script, he sent officials to a neighboring state, Hausa, to learn Arabic. However, due to the increase of powerful Hausa influence in his land, Njoya decided that Arabic was not the right language to learn for his people, as Hausa and outside colonial forces could read it as well. He needed to focus on creating and reforming the script he, and his officials, created. The following decades were spent simplifying the number and complexity of the design of the characters.

The script was finalized in 1910, where the “A-ka-u-ku” script was shortened into 80 symbols with more simple graphics that were easier to write and reproduce. Njoya used this script to put together a book that composed of roughly twelve hundred pages. In these pages, Njoya detailed the history and customs of the Bamum people.

This is not to be confused with another of Njoya's inventions, an artificial spoken language known as Shümom, which was devised after the script. Outsider observers in recent years have tended to confuse the script with the invented language. The French colonials destroyed Njoya's schools and forbade the teaching of the script, which fell into rapid decline and today hovers on the brink of extinction (the Bamum Scripts and Archives Project, in Foumban, is teaching the script to young people to spread literacy), but the Shümom language is spoken as a second language by many people and is taught on the radio throughout the Bamum kingdom. Cameroonian musicians Claude Ndam and Gerryland are native speakers of Bamum and use it in their music.

== Nguon ==
As the first king of Bamum was crowned, he and seven officers, called Koms, wanted to find a way to maintain and ensure the laws of the state would be followed by the king. The Koms were independent of the state and not controlled under the authority of the king, allowing them to censor any royal actions that went against the common law. To ensure this process is followed, they created a ceremonial ritual called Nguon.

In this celebration, the king is formally dethroned, this gives the kom the right to criticize and condemn the now-former king. Afterward, the king is reinstalled to his throne and formally addresses his nation with a speech. The ceremonial speech is followed by gifts and goods sent to the palace by chiefs, locally and from surrounding villages. Nguon was held every two years and was a major part of the Bamum calendar. For an almost 70-year period, the celebrational ritual was suspended by colonial forces in 1923. The colonial power was attempting to diminish the power and control within the area and the power of the sultan Ibrahim Njoya. It wasn’t until 1992, that the sultan's son, Ibrahim Mbombo Njoya, reestablished the celebration. It now continues to be held every two years once more. To this day, it continues to be a significant holiday for the Bamum people.

== Power in art ==
The Bamum territory covered major trade routes, allowing them to gain access to multiple mediums. Those include brass and glass beads, which are a major component in Bamum art. The visual domain is where the Bamum were able to showcase their power and dominance within their state. The art is used as a reminder of the historical development and supremacy of the Bamum people.

To do this, the Bamum artists appropriated the regalia and symbols of defeated leaders from surrounding states. They also take other objects from the leader’s treasures, and they keep the appropriated replica in the Bamum palace. They also created brand new symbols of power for the rulers and male descendants of the court. This symbol is to be a visual representation of their connection to the court and the king. They are commonly displayed as an embellishment to their apparel.

Artists were also known for their work covering wooden sculptures as bead embroiderers. Many works are a part of thrones and statues, often kept within the village palace. These works intended to focus on the expansion of the Bamum land and the warfare used in the expansion, showcasing the strengthened ties in the groups that make up Bamum. Two motifs were common when trying to display the power of the Bamum in warfare. One is a single head, which one can assume it belongs to an enemy. Usually, the head is paired with a spear held in the other hand. This is shown in brass statues that were created showing a Bamum male holding the head of an enemy. Another motif is an equestrian figure made from wood and then covered in beadwork.

== Palace art ==
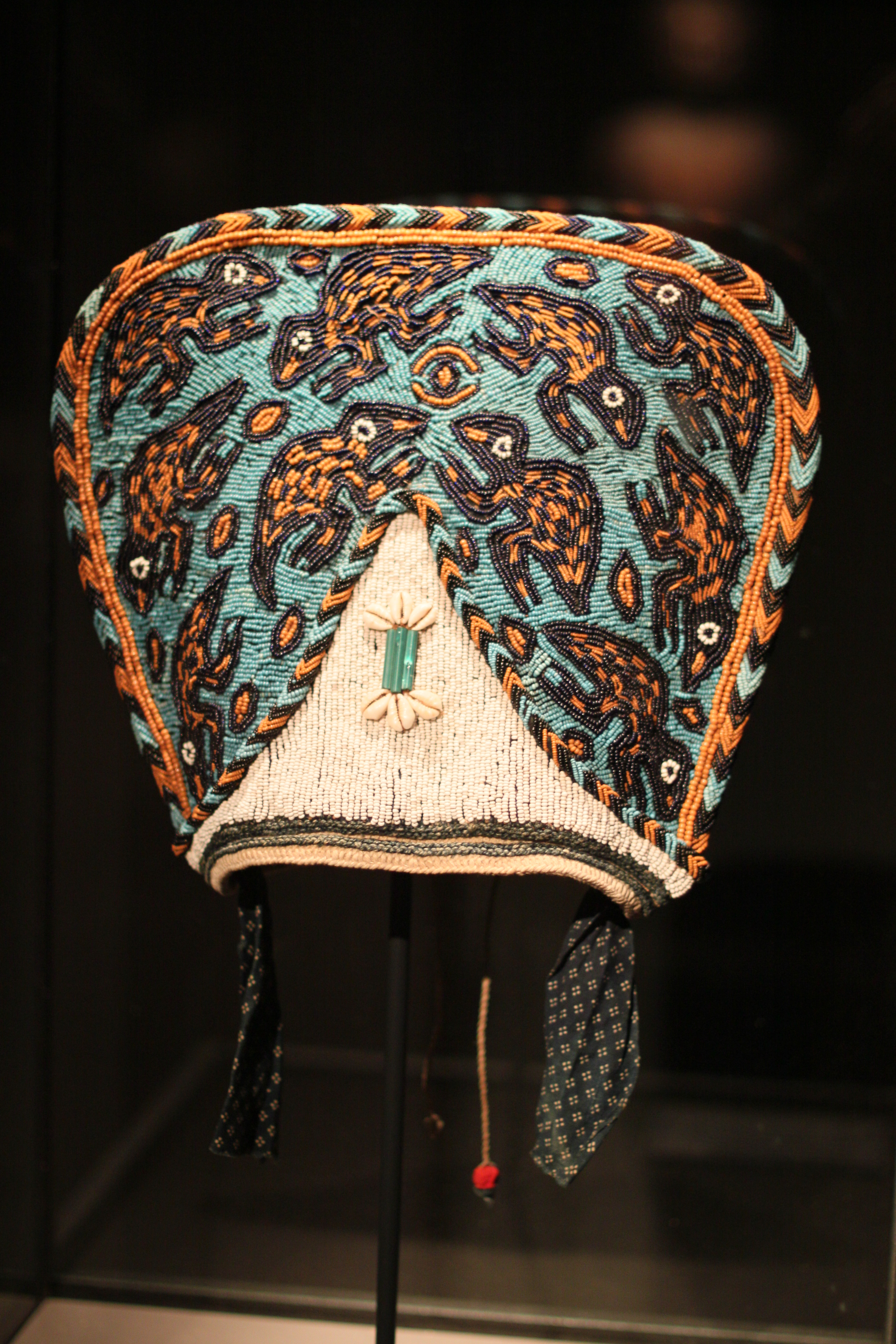
Royal headdress (mpelet), ca. 1900 Ethnological Museum of Berlin

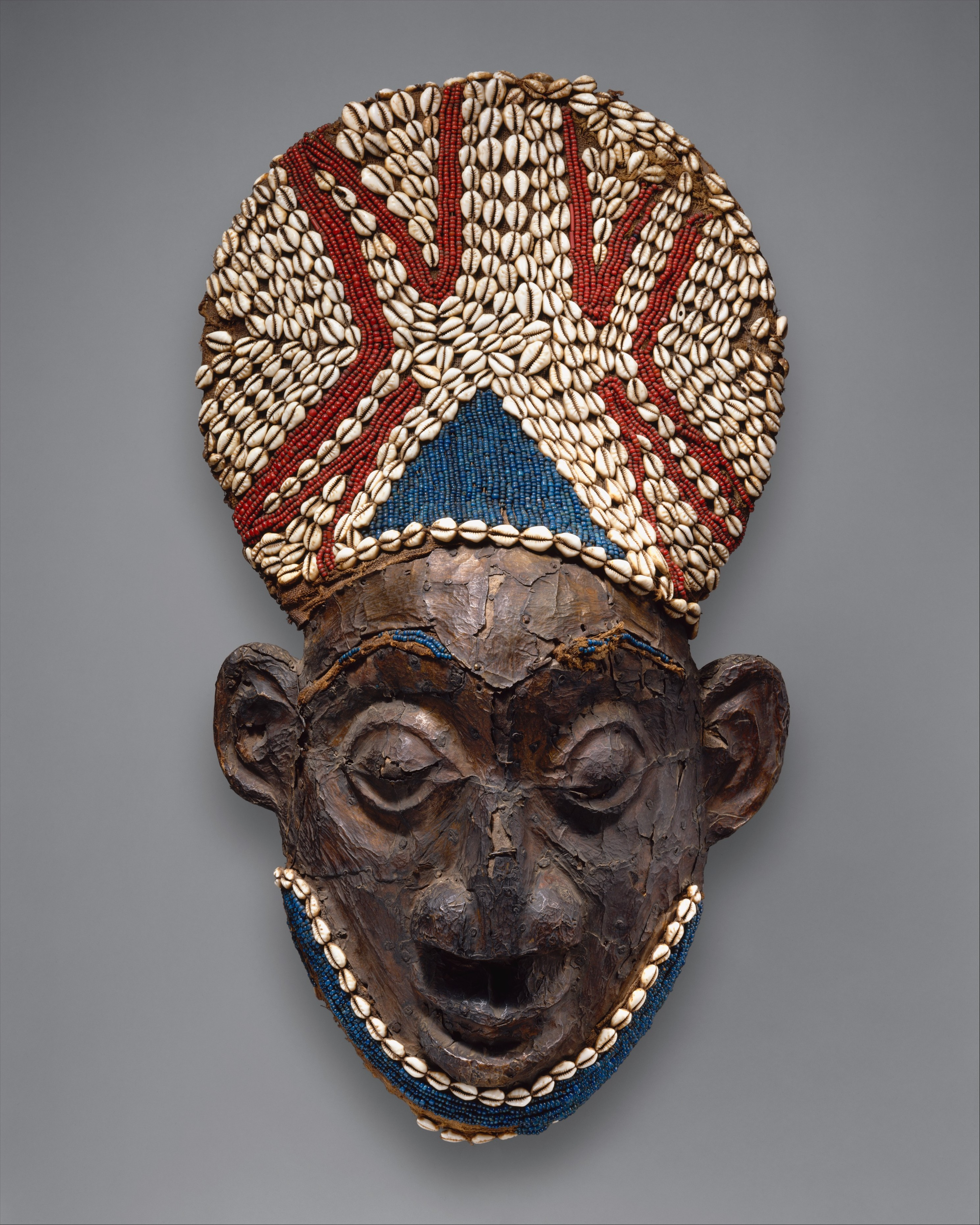
Helmet Mask - Metropolitan Museum of Art

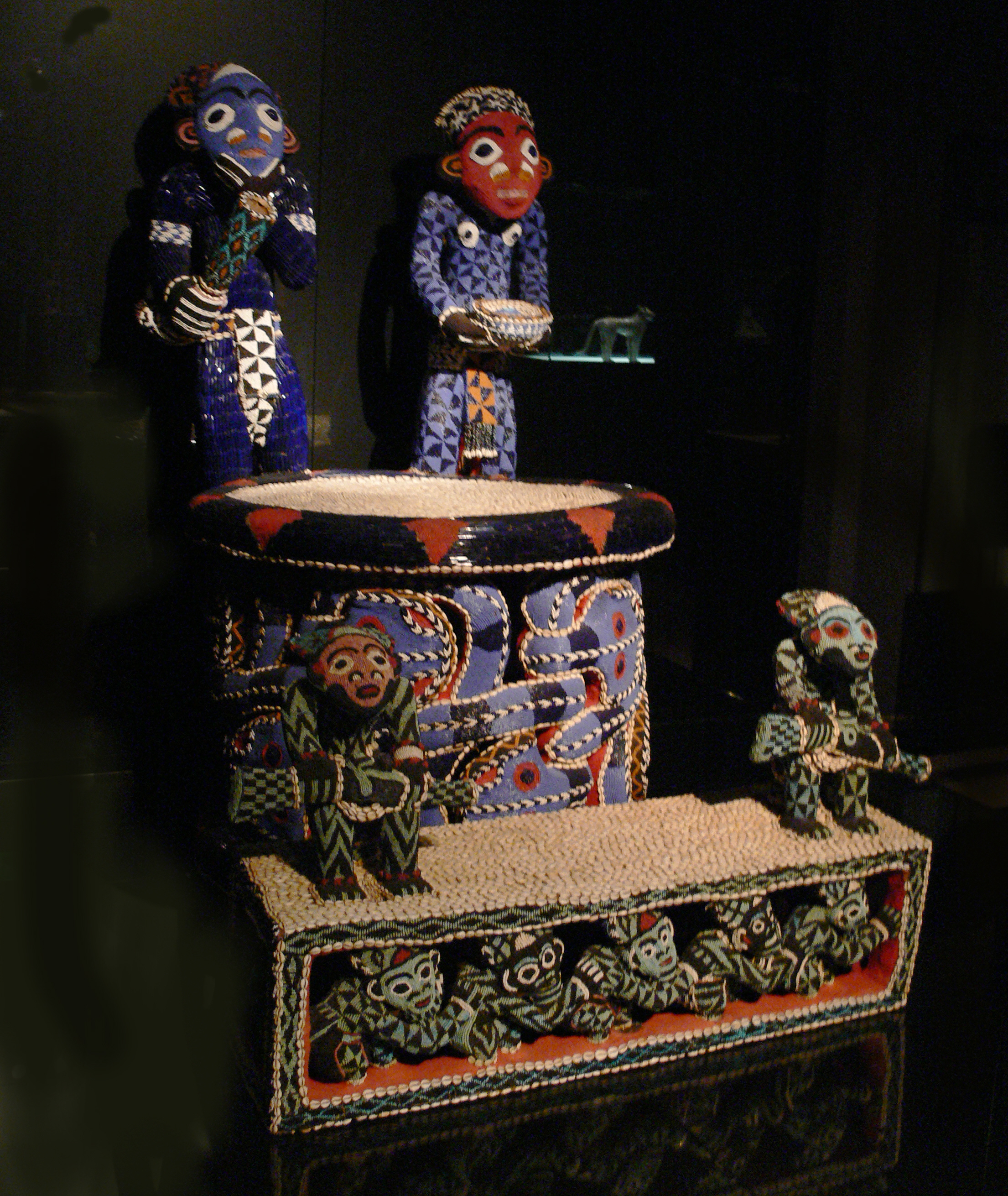
Throne of King Nsangu, ca. 1880 Ethnological Museum of Berlin

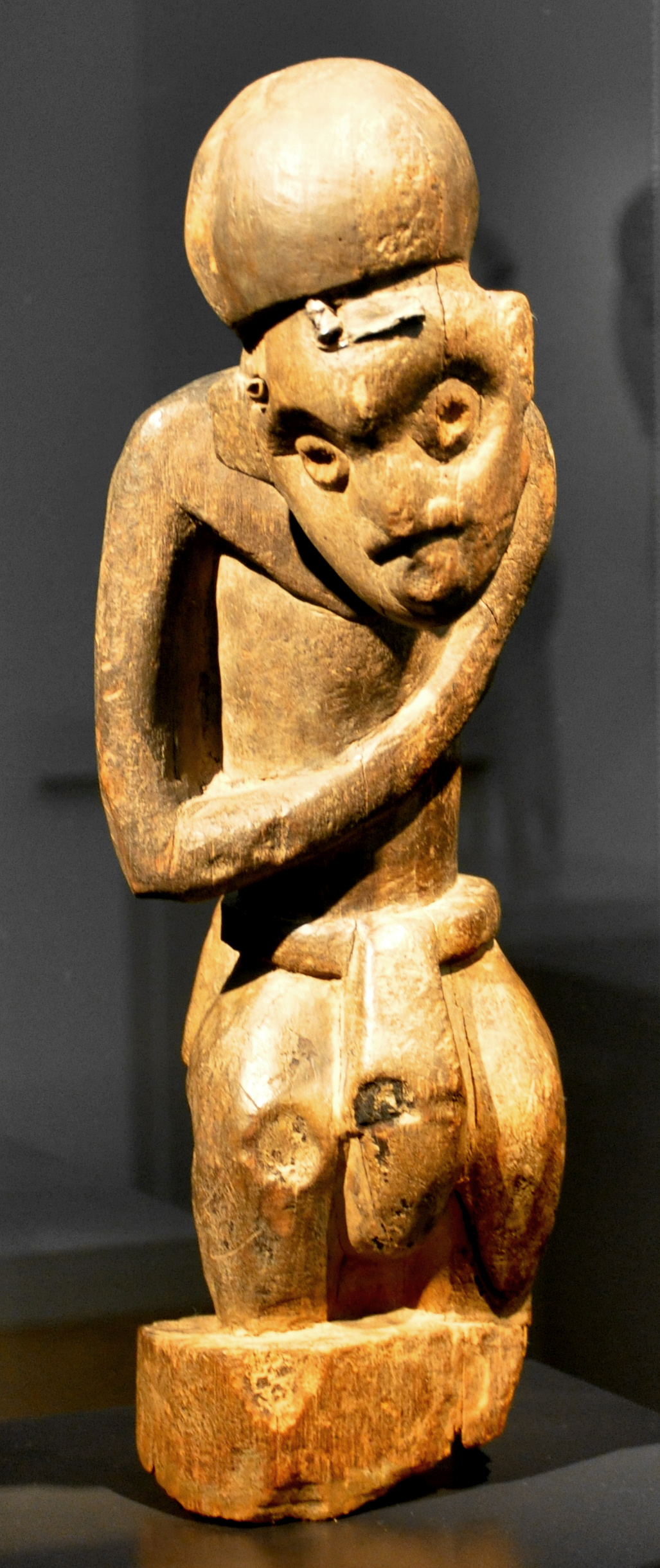
Figural sculpture, 19th century Museum Rietberg

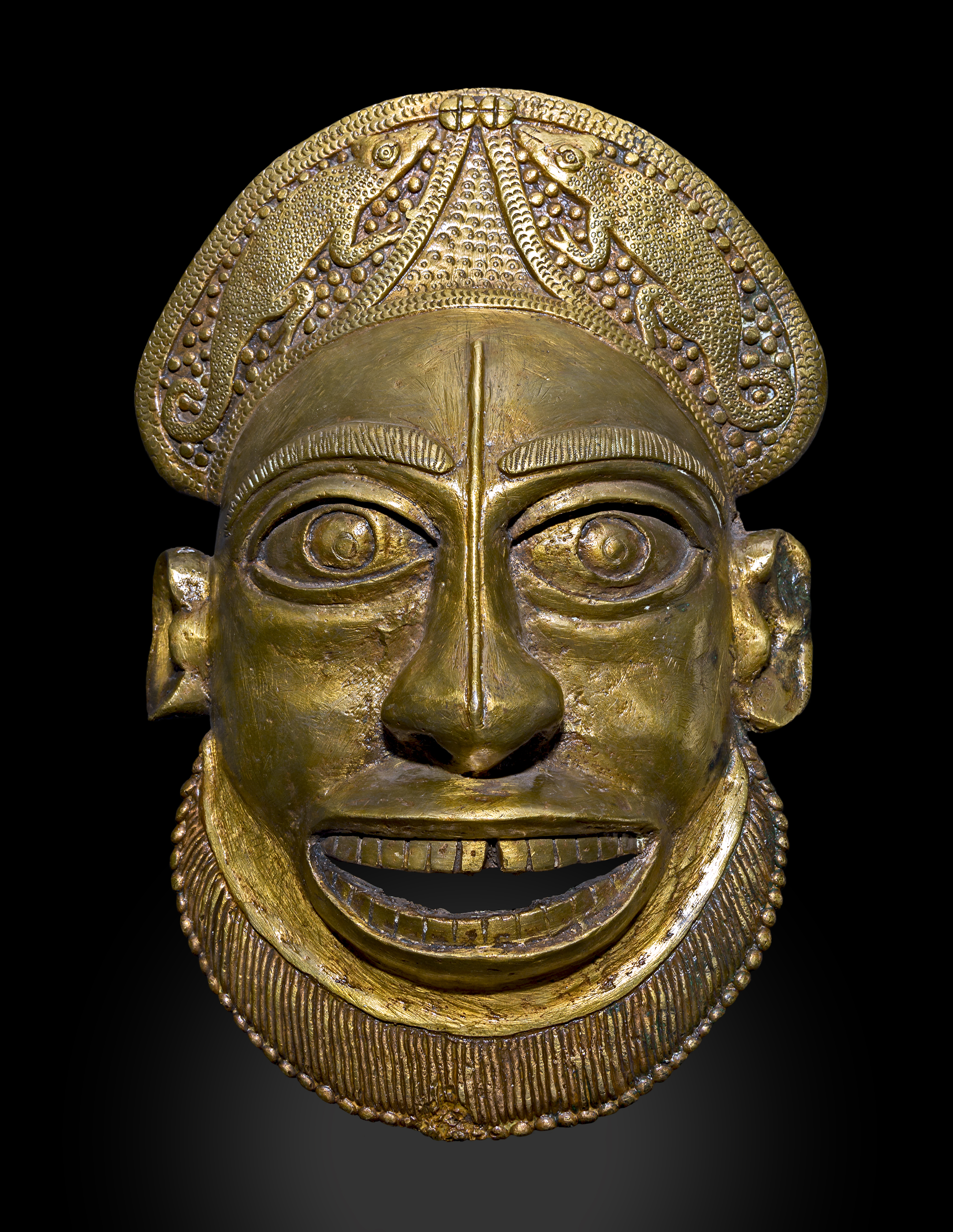
Facial mask in bronze 1935 MHNT

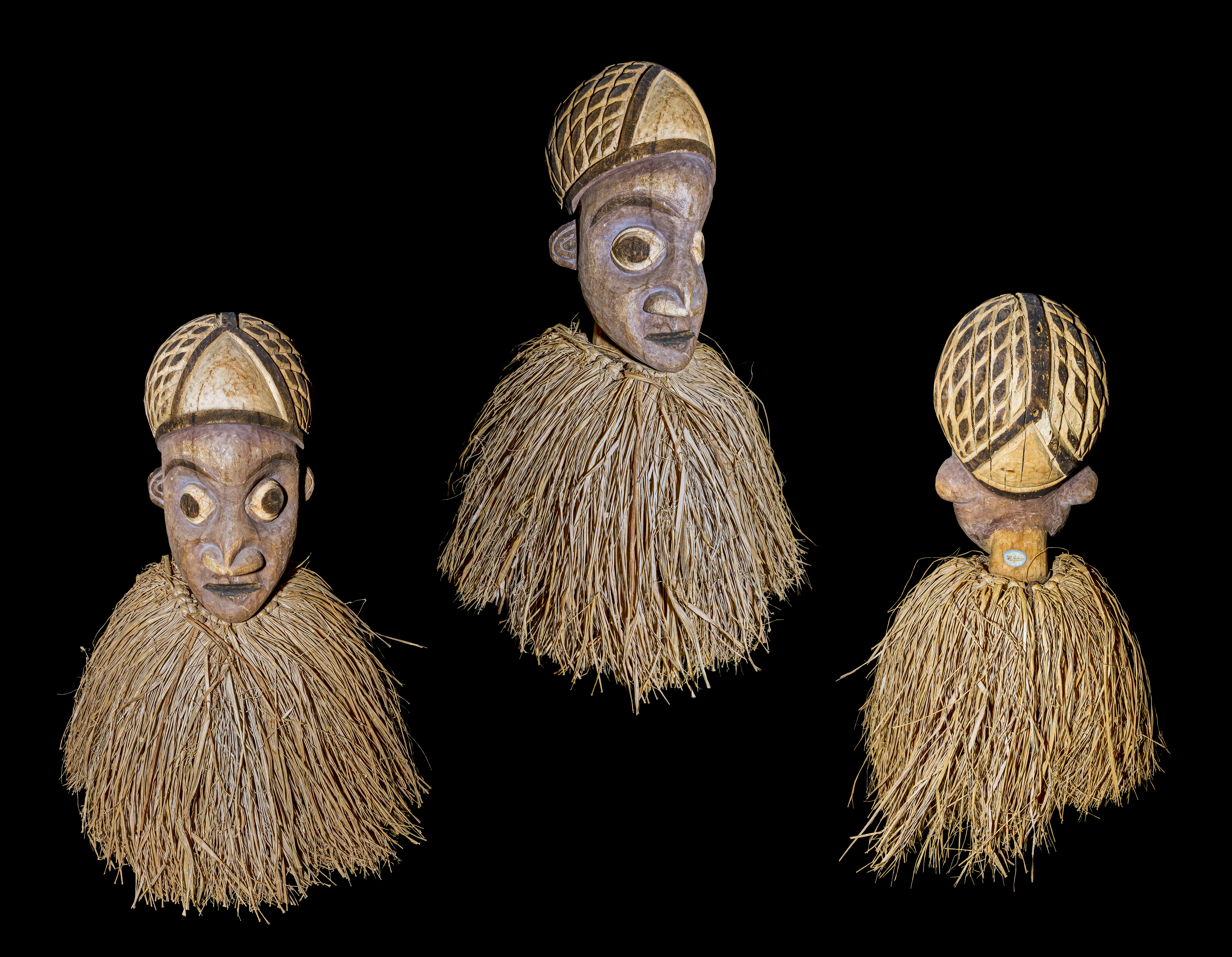
Crest mask - 1935 MHNT

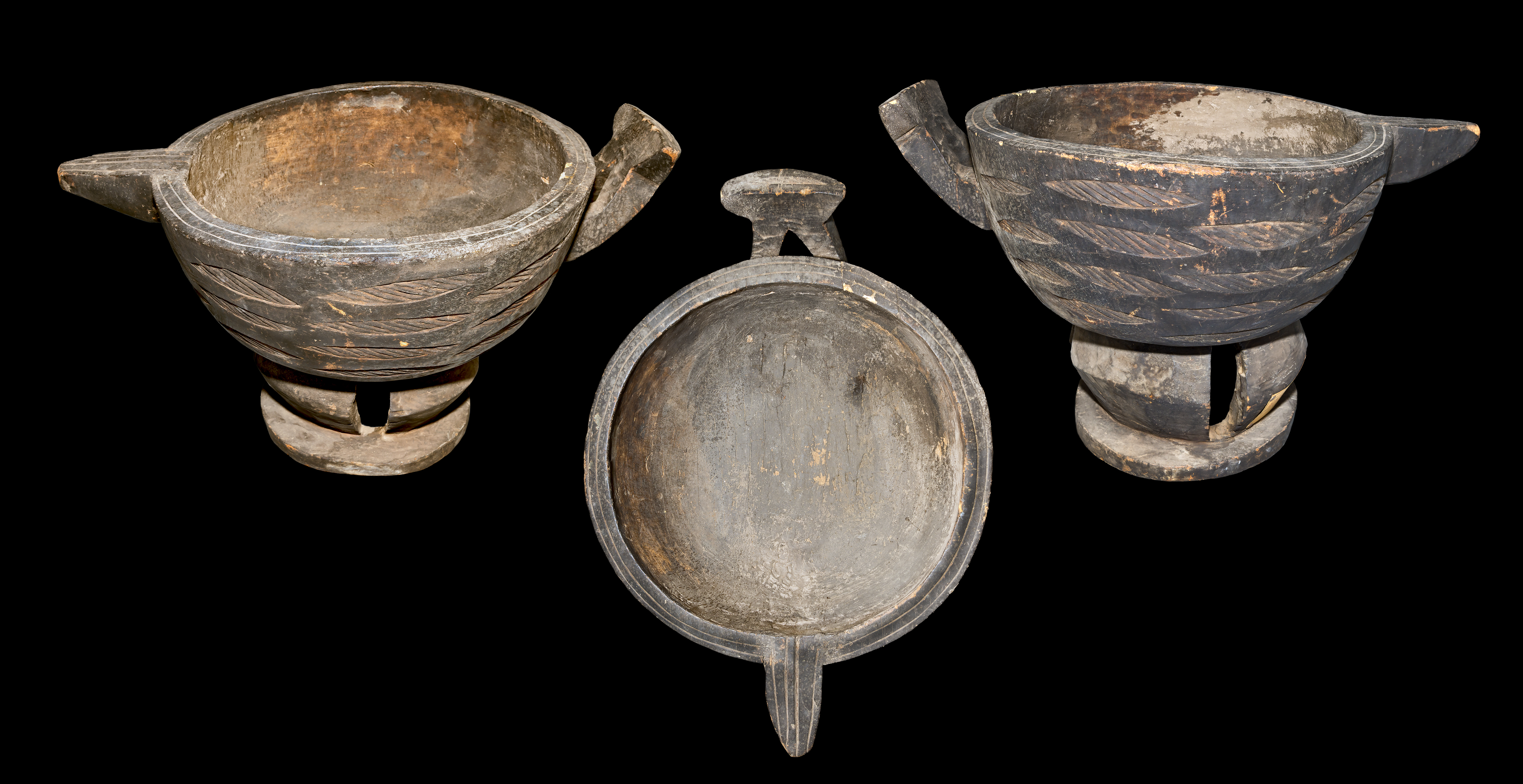
Wooden container 1935 MHNT

== See also ==
- List of rulers of the Bamum
- Bamum kingdom
