= Ibrahim Mbombo Njoya =

Cameroonian King (1937–2021)

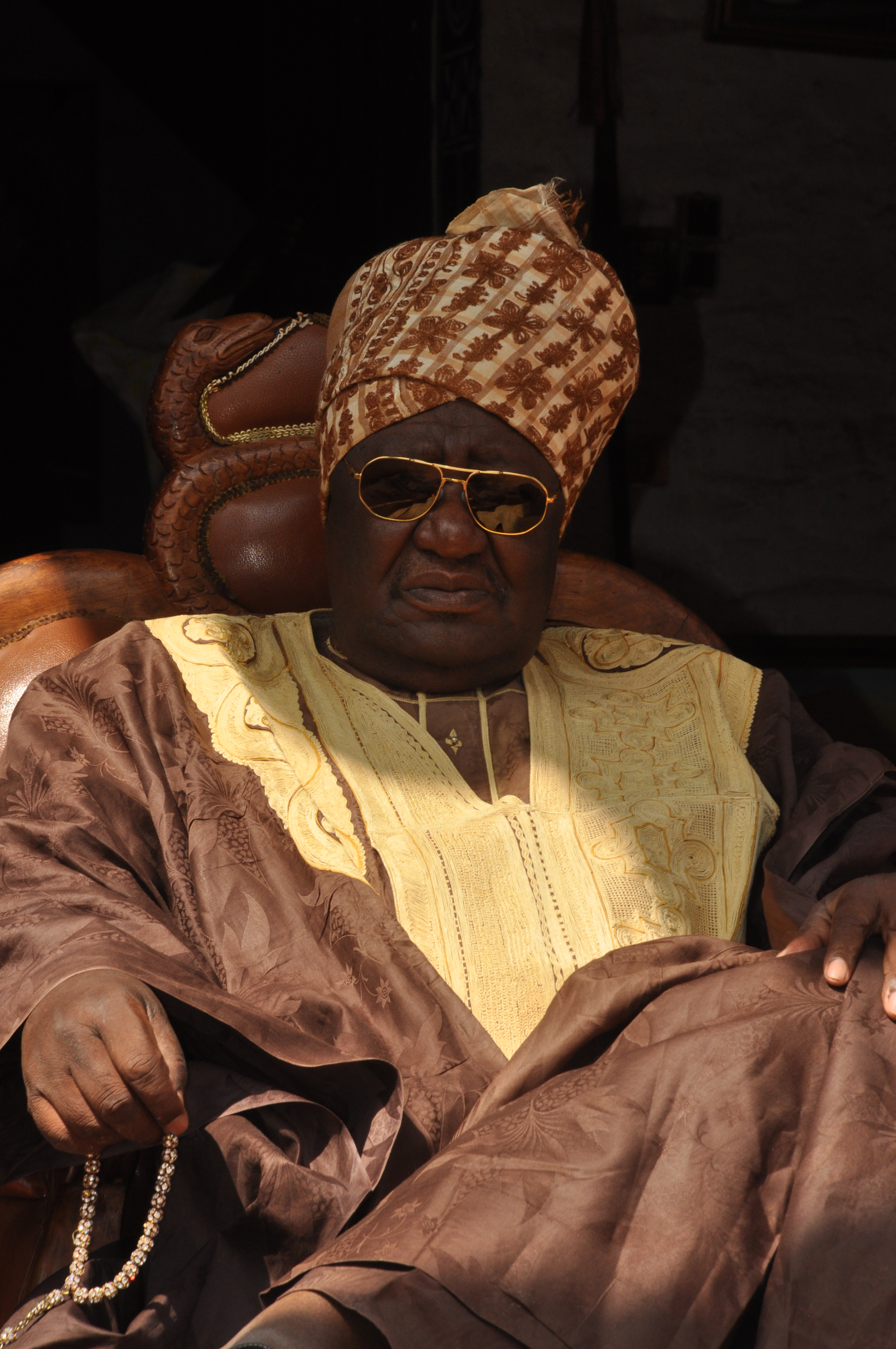
- Ibrahim Mbombo Njoya in 2014

Mfon of the Bamum
- Reign: 28 July 1992 – 27 September 2021
- Predecessor: Seidou Njimoluh Njoya
- Successor: Nabil Mbombo Njoya
- Born: 27 October 1937; Foumban, Cameroon
- Died: 27 September 2021 (aged 83); American Hospital, Paris, France
- Father: Seidou Njimoluh Njoya
- Mother: Noh Lantana
- Occupation: Politician

Ibrahim Mbombo Njoya (27 October 1937 – 27 September 2021) was a Cameroonian politician and traditional King.

== Biography ==
He was trained as a civil administrator at the Institute for Administrative Studies in Dakar, after which he entered politics as a member of Cameroon's ruling party, the Cameroon People's Democratic Movement. He was a Senator and held several important government positions including Vice Minister of National Education and Culture, Vice Minister of Foreign Affairs, Minister of Youth and Sports, Minister of Information, and ambassador to Equatorial Guinea and Egypt. He was the king of the Bamum people from 1992 until his death in 2021.

Mbombo Njoya died due to complications of COVID-19, for which he was being treated in intensive care at the American Hospital of Paris, exactly a month prior to turning 84.

== See also ==
- List of rulers of the Bamum
