= Kingdom of Bamum =

Kingdom in Northwest Region of Cameroon

Kingdom of Bamum Bamum
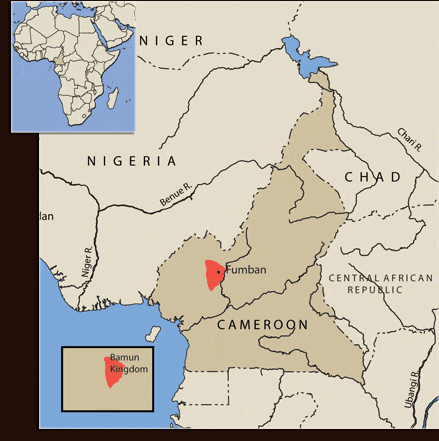
- Territory of the kingdom during the reign of Ibrahim Njoya in present-day Republic of Cameroon.
- Status: Kingdom
- Capital: Fumban
- Common languages: Bamum language
- Religion: Islam
- Government: Monarchy
- Mfon
  - 1394--1418: Nchare Yen (first)
  - 1886--1933: Ibrahim Njoya
- History
  - Established: 1394
  - Disestablished: 1923

The Kingdom of Bamoun (also spelled Bamoum, Bamun, Bamoun, or Mum) was a state in central Africa, part of what is now northwest Cameroon. It was founded by the Bamun, an ethnic group from northeast Cameroon. Its capital was the ancient walled city of Fumban. The kingdom came under control of German West Africa in 1916.

== Origins ==
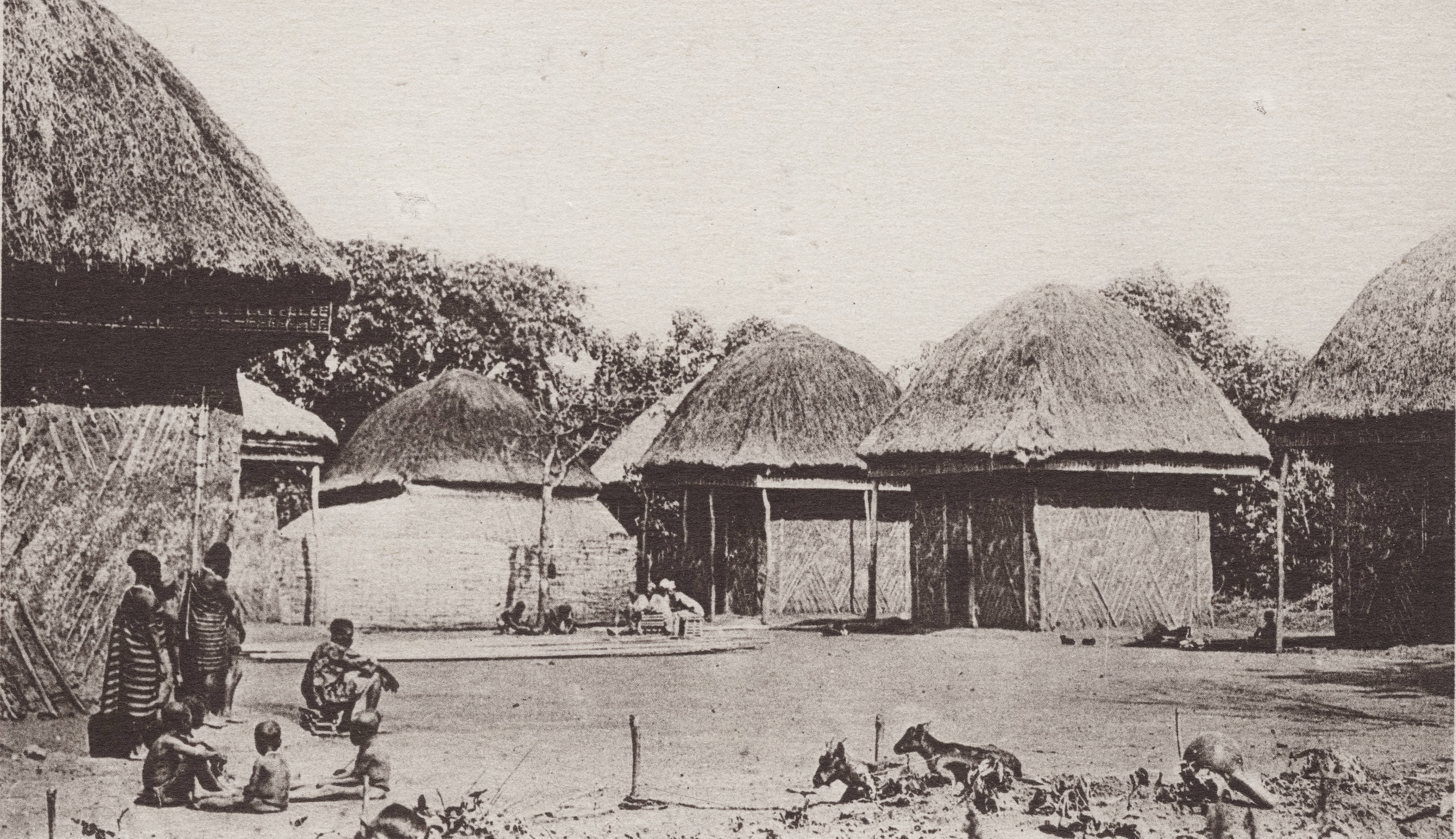
Traditional houses in Foumban

The Bamum kingdom was originally founded by the older brother of the Tikar royal dynasty. The founding king (called a "fon" or "mfon") was Nchare, a conqueror reputed to have crushed some 18 rulers. King Nchare founded the capital Foumban, then called Mfomben. This first group of Tikar emigrants conquerors absorbed the language and customs of their new subjects and were from then on known as Mbum. It is believed that Chamba migrations from the Tikar Plain in the southern part of the western Adamawa Plateau resulted in the kingdom's foundation.

== History ==
Royal Mask

During the 18th century, the kingdom faced the threat of invasion from the north by Fulani and Chamba warriors. By the end of the century, Bamum had perhaps 10,000-12,000 within its domain. The history and customs of the Bamum list ten kings between the founder and Kuotu. The nine kings who followed Nchare are not remembered for anything special. They were not conquerors, and territorial expansion did not occur until the reign of the tenth Mbum, Mbum Mbuembue, in the early 19th century.

King Mbuembue was the first ruler to expand the Bamun Kingdom, famously claiming that he would mark his borders "with blood and black iron". He repelled an attack by the Fulani leader Hamman Sambo in the 1820s, fortifying the capital with a trench that stopped the Fulani horsemen. He was the founder of the emblem of the Bamun people, characteristic of their capabilities to fight in two fronts and win both at the same time. He represented the Bamun people by a snake with two heads known as "Ngnwe peh tu."

=== German annexation ===
The Bamun kingdom voluntarily became part of German Kamerun in 1884 during the reign of Mfon Nsangou. During his reign, Bamum fought a war with the Nso. By the end of the conflict, the king was killed, and his head was carried off by the Nso. Immediately after, one of the king's wives, Njapdunke, took over the kingdom's government with her lover Gbetnkom Ndo`mbue. (Gbetnkom was not the mfon as there was another Gbetnkom who was the son of Mfon Mbuembue the great conqueror.) After the death of Mfon Mbuembue, there was no male heir to inherit his throne. Njapdunke took over for some time but failed to represent the king. She was removed and it was thought that one of the king's sons Mbetnkom was at a village called Massagham for treatment. He was brought back and became Mfon Mbetnkom.

Mbetnkom was a short man, a dictator who had the legs of those who were taller than him chopped off. This was a practice that cost his life during a hunting training session. After his death, his little son, Mbienkuo succeeded him. He was too young to rule. It became a habit for him to want to know who was his father amongst the people who were taking guards behind him. His court led by Ngouoh became doubtful and thought the boy may eventually learn that they are the people who killed his father. Mfon Mbienkuo was carried away and killed in a place called "Mfe shut Mfon mbwere." The throne remained vacant for some time and Ngouoh, the leader of the court ultimately became Mfon. He unfortunately was not a descendant of king Mbuembue. He was a Bamileke slave. Ngouoh was not welcome by his subjects and decided to move the palace to his own location. Mfon Ngouoh was later chased away after a fierce fight between him and the followers of Mbuembue. Nsangou, a grandson of Mbuembue became king.

==== Njoya the Great ====
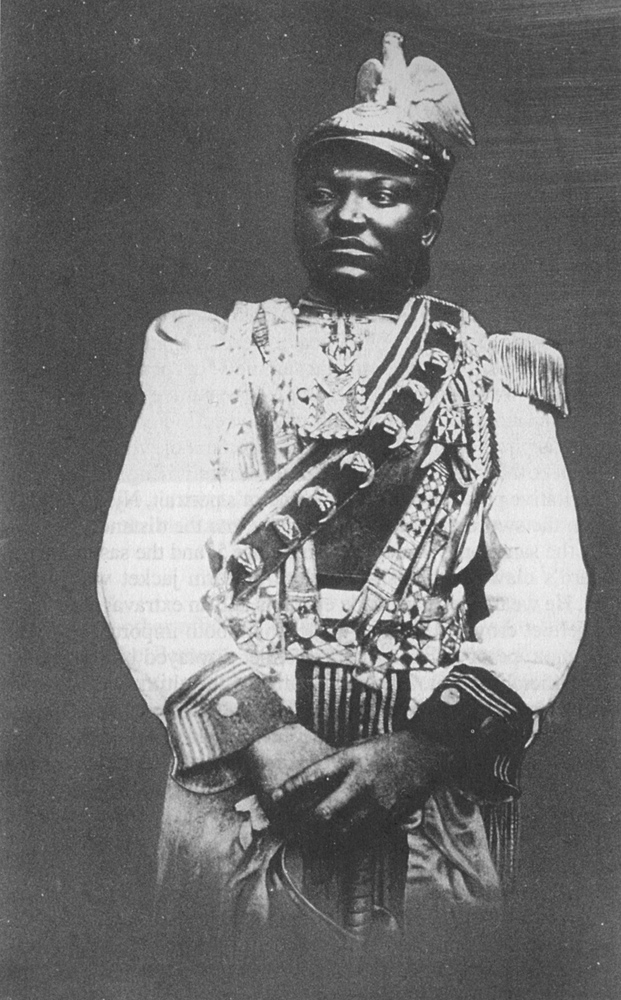
King Njoya, c. 1907

Eventually King Njoya, son of the slain king, came to power. He was one of Bamum's most prolific rulers and ruled from approximately 1883 to 1931. He voluntarily put his kingdom under the protection of German colonial power and was responsible for modernizing certain elements of Mbum society.

In 1897, Njoya and his court converted to Islam, a decision that would affect Bamun culture long after Njoyua's death. He invented the Bamum script so that his people could record Bamum's history. In 1910, Njoya had a school constructed where the script was taught. Germans were allowed to set up the Basel Mission at the capital of and construction was undertaken to build a temple. A school was built, staffed by missionaries who taught in German and the native language. The Germans introduced new housing construction techniques while settling among the kingdom's inhabitants as farmers, traders and educators. King Njoya remained loyal to his German overlords who respected his rights as king and consulted him on colonial business.

Another important element in the kingdom's history during German protection was the introduction of sweet potatoes, macabo and other new foods, which helped the kingdom become more prosperous. The Mbum were able to trade outside their traditional borders, and the income greatly improved the standard of living. King Njoya was much influenced by the missionaries who denounced idols, human sacrifice and polygamy. In response, Njoya cut back on royal excesses. Nobles were allowed to marry slaves and those of the non-landed servile class. The king, however, remained unconverted to Christianity. He merged some of the tenets of Christianity and Islam with traditional beliefs to create a new religion more palatable to his subjects.

In 1906, Germany sent an expeditionary force against the Nso backed up by King Njoya's warriors. After the victory, the force reclaimed the head of Njoya's father, which was crucial for legitimizing the king. From then on, the bond between Bamum and Germany was strong.

=== World War I and French invasion ===
In 1914, the Allies invaded German Kamerun as part of the West African campaign. Fumban was captured by the British under Colonel Gorges in December 1915, and Gorges included a first-hand account of the people and their capital in his book. Gorges described Njoya as being understandably "a trifle nervous" when they first met but accepted British rule once he was reassured that no harm would come to him or his people. In 1918, Germany's colonial possessions including Kamerun were divided between Great Britain and France, and the kingdom of Bamoun thus fell under French rule. In 1923 Njoya was deposed, and his script was banned by the French.

== Organization ==
The Bamum kingdom's population used secret societies. One society, the ngiri, was for princes. Another, the mitngu, was for the general populace regardless of social status. The mfon recruited most of his retainers from twins and the sons of princesses.

The king of Bamum was known as the mfon, a title shared by Tikar rulers. The mfon engaged in large-scale polygamy giving rise to a proliferation of royal lineages. This led to the palace nobility growing rapidly.

== Culture ==
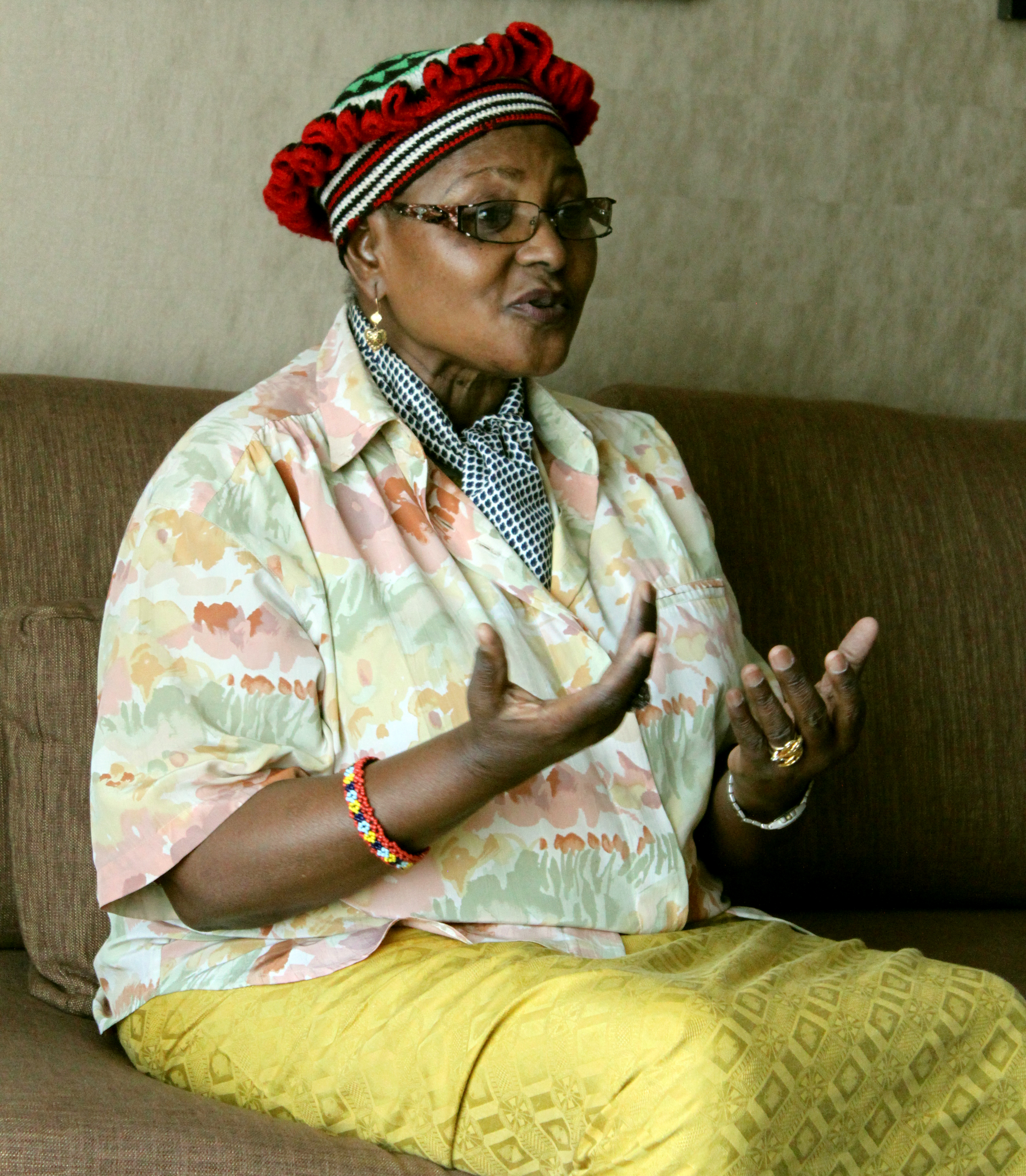
MomaMfon Rabiatou Njoya in Baku

=== Society ===
Little is known about the kingdom's material and social culture during this time. Originally, the language of state in the Bamum kingdom was that of the Tikar. This apparently did not last long, and the language of the conquered Mben was adopted. The economy was largely agricultural, and slave owning was practiced on a small scale. The Bamum kingdom traded with neighboring populations. They imported salt, iron, beads, cotton goods and copper objects.

=== Artistry ===
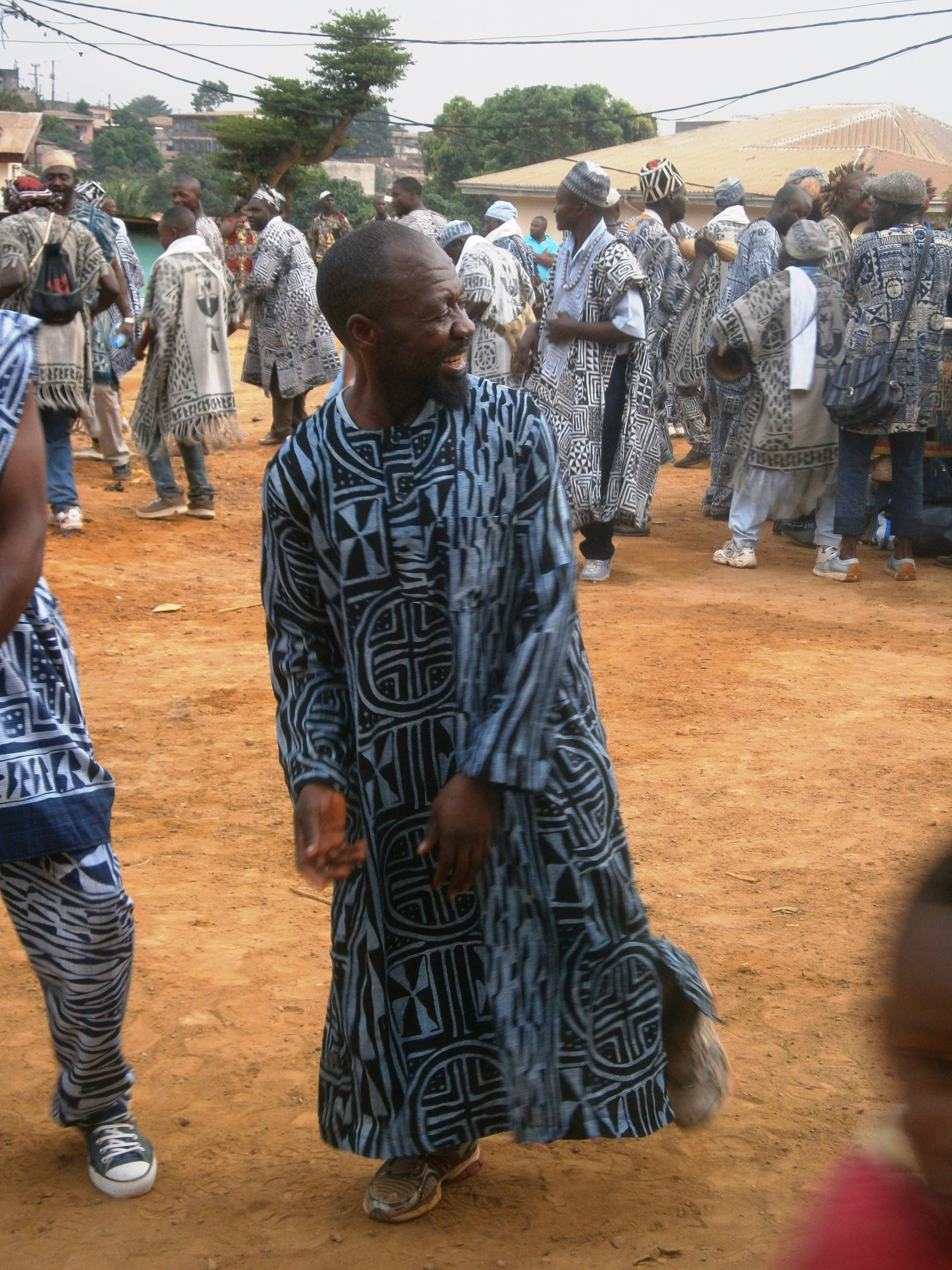
Bamoun cultural regalia and dance moves

The Bamun developed an extensive artistic culture at their capital of Foumban at the beginning of the 20th century. During Njoya’s reign six color dye pits were maintained. The Mbum imported indigo-dyed raffia-sewn cloth from the Hausa as royal cloth. This royal cloth was called Ntieya, and Hausa craftsmen were kept at palace workshops to supply nobles and teach the art of dyeing.

== See also ==
- List of rulers of the Bamum
- History of Cameroon
- Bamum (people)

== Sources and further reading ==
- Bisson, Michael S; S. Terry Childs; Philip de Barros; Augustin F. C. Holl (2001). Ancient African Metallurgy: The Sociocultural Context. Stuttgart: Alta Mira Press. pp. 550 Pages. ISBN 3-515-08704-4.
- Fowler, Ian; David Zeitlyn (1996). African Crossroads: Intersections Between History and Anthropology in Cameroon. Oxford: Berghahn Books. pp. 250 Pages. ISBN 1-57181-926-6.
- Gérard, Albert S. (1986). European-language Writing in Sub-Saharan Africa Vol. 1. Budapest: John Benjamins Publishing Company. pp. 1288 Pages. ISBN 963-05-3832-6.
- Gorges E.H. (1930). The Great War in West Africa. Hutchinson & Co. Ltd., London; Naval & Military Press, Uckfield, 2004: ISBN 1-84574-115-3
- Ogot, Bethwell A. (1999). General History of Africa V: Africa from the Sixteenth to the Eighteenth Century. Berkeley: University of California Press. pp. 512 Pages. ISBN 0-520-06700-2.
- McBride, David; Leroy Hopkins; C. Aisha Blackshire-Belay (1998). Crosscurrents: African Americans, Africa, and Germany in the Modern World. Rochester: Boydell & Brewer. pp. 260 Pages. ISBN 1-57113-098-5.
- Perani, Judith; Norma H. Wolff (1999). Cloth, Dress and Art Patronage in Africa. Oxford: Berg Publishers. p. 217. ISBN 1-85973-295-X.
- Polakoff, Claire (1982). African Textiles and Dying Techniques. Garden City: Routledge. pp. 256 Pages. ISBN 0-7100-0908-9.
- Yakan, Mohamad Z. (1999). Almanac of African Peoples & Nations. Edison: Transaction Publishers. pp. 847 Pages. ISBN 0-87855-496-3.
