= Claude Ndam =

Cameroonian singer-songwriter (1955–2020)

- Born: 27 May 1955; Foumban, French Cameroon
- Died: 12 June 2020 (aged 65); Yaoundé, Cameroon
- Occupation: Singer-Songwriter

Claude Ndam (27 May 1955 – 12 June 2020) was a Cameroonian singer-songwriter.

== Biography ==
Ndam was born in Foumban in the west of the country. He became famous in the 1980s for his discography.

Claude Ndam died in Yaoundé at the age of 65 on 12 June 2020.

== Discography ==
- Oh Oh Oh
- C'est toi que j'aime
- Mona La Veve
- U Nguo Ya
