= List of rulers of the Bamum =

Royal Mask of the Bamum

List of rulers of the Bamum kingdom, a kingdom located in northwest Cameroon. The capital Fumban is also spelled Foumban in some sources.

(Dates in italics indicate de facto continuation of office.)

Mfon = Ruler

| Tenure | Incumbent | Notes |
|---|---|---|
| 1394 | Foundation of the Sultanate of Fumban by the Mfon of the Bamum (Mum) | |
Mfon (Sultans)
| 1394 to 1418 | Nchare Yen, Mfon | |
| 1418 to 1461 | Ngoupou, Mfon | |
| 1461 to 1498 | Monjou, Mfon | |
| 1498 to 1519 | Mengap, Mfon | |
| 1519 to 1544 | Ngouh I, Mfon | |
| 1544 to 1568 | Fifen, Mfon | |
| 1568 to 1590 | Ngouh II, Mfon | |
| 1590 to 1629 | Ngapna, Mfon | |
| 1629 to 1682 | Ngouloure, Mfon | |
| 1682 to 1757 | Koutou, Mfon | |
| 1757 to 1814 | Mbouombouo, Mfon | |
| 1814 to 1817 | Ngbetnkom, Mfon | |
| 1817 to 1818 | Mbeikuo, Mfon | |
| 1818 to 1865 | Ngouhouo, Mfon | |
| 1865 to 1865 | Ngoungoure, Mfon | Only woman to rule. Her rule lasted 30 minutes. |
| 1865 to 14 July 1884 | Nsangou, Mfon | |
| 14 July 1884 | Incorporated into German Kamerun | |
| 14 July 1884 to 1889 | Nsangou, Mfon | (contd.) |
| 1889 to 1914 | Ibrahim Njoya, Mfon | |
| 1914 to 1960 | Incorporated into French Cameroun | |
| 1914 to 1931 | Ibrahim Njoya, Mfon | (contd.) |
| 1931 to 1933 | Interregnum | |
| 1933 to 1960 | al-Haji Seidou Njimoluh Njoya, Mfon | |
| 1960 to current | Incorporated into Independent Cameroon | |
| 1960 to 1992 | al-Haji Seidou Njimoluh Njoya, Mfon | (contd.) |
| 1992 to 2021 | al-Haji Ibrahim Mbombo Njoya, Mfon | |
| 2021 to present | Nabil Mbombo Njoya | |

== See also ==
- Cameroon
  - Politics of Cameroon
  - Heads of state of Cameroon
  - Colonial heads of Cameroon British Cameroon (Cameroons)
  - Heads of government of Cameroon (Cameroons)
  - Colonial heads of French Cameroon (Cameroun)
  - Heads of government of French Cameroon (Cameroun)
  - Colonial heads of German Cameroon (Kamerun)
  - Rulers of Mandara
- Lists of office-holders
