= Cameroonian Highlands forests =

Forest ecoregion in Cameroon and Nigeria

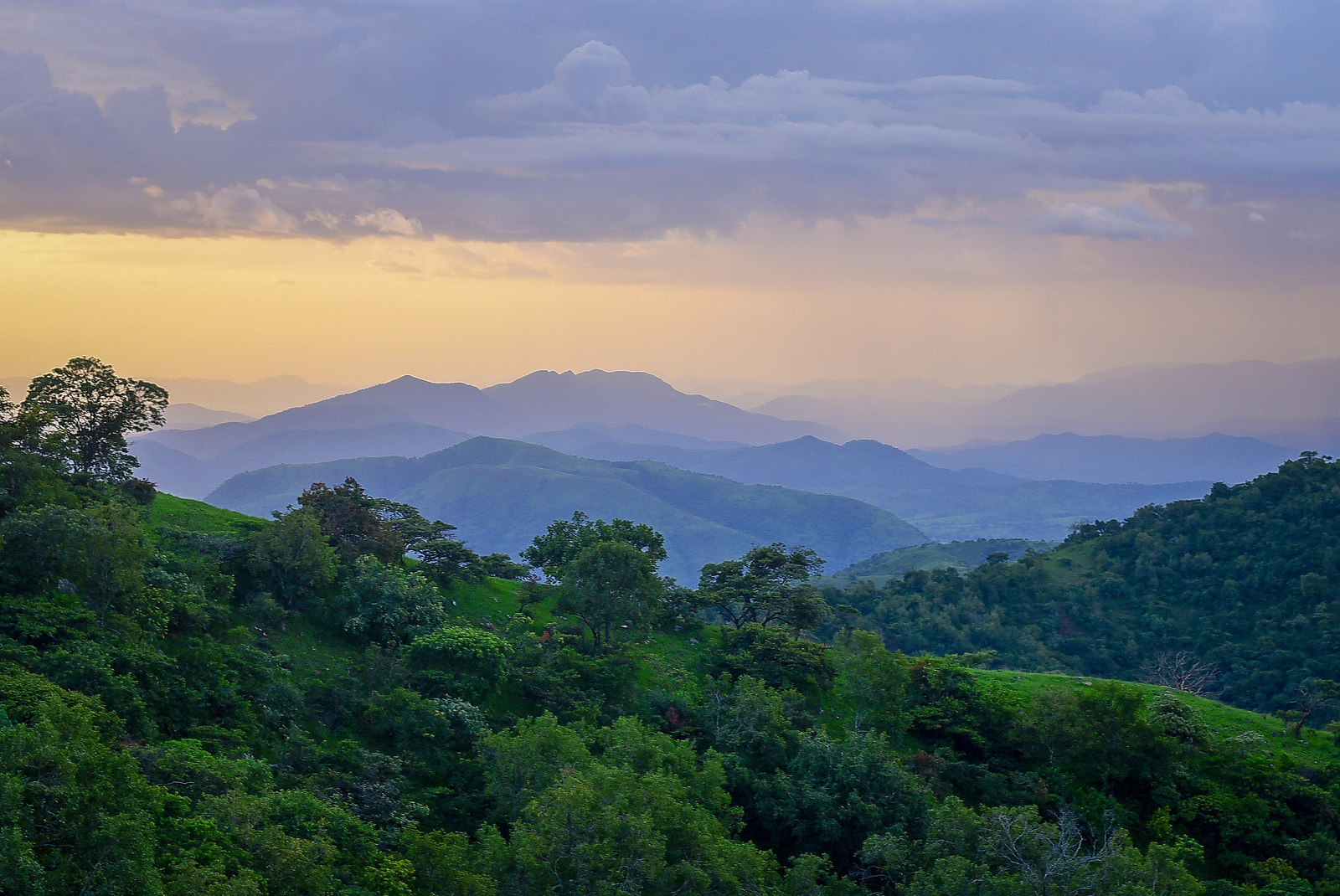
- Chappal Waddi, in Gashaka Gumti National Park

- Map of the Cameroonian Highlands forests

Ecology
- Realm: Afrotropical
- Biome: tropical and subtropical moist broadleaf forests
- Borders: Cross–Sanaga–Bioko coastal forests; Guinean forest–savanna mosaic; Mount Cameroon and Bioko montane forests; Northern Congolian forest–savanna mosaic

Geography
- Area: 38,000 km^{2} (15,000 mi^{2})
- Countries: Cameroon; Nigeria
- Coordinates: 6°N 11°E

Conservation
- Conservation status: Critical/endangered
- Protected: 6.9%

The Cameroonian Highlands forests, also known as the Cameroon Highlands forests, is a montane tropical moist broadleaf forest ecoregion located on the range of mountains that runs inland from the Gulf of Guinea and forms the border between Cameroon and Nigeria. This is an area of forest and grassland which has become more populous as land is cleared for agriculture.

== Geography ==
The Cameroonian Highlands forests extend across the Cameroon Highlands, a chain of extinct volcanoes, covering an area of 38,000 square kilometers (15,000 sq mi) in eastern Nigeria and western Cameroon. The highlands extend roughly southwest–northeast. In the southwest the ecoregion includes the Rumpi Hills, Bakossi Mountains, Mount Nlonako, Mount Kupe, and Mount Manengouba. It extends northeast towards the Mambila Plateau, and north to the Bamenda Highlands. It continues northeast along the western flank of the Adamawa Plateau to Tchabal Gangdaba. Northern outliers include the Mambilla Plateau to the northeast, Nigeria's Obudu Plateau to the northwest, the Alantika Mountains and Hosséré Vokré to the north, and in the southeastern Adamawa Plateau east of Ngaoundéré.

The ecoregion lies above 900 meters elevation, and is surrounded at lower elevations by the Cross–Sanaga–Bioko coastal forests at the southern end of the range, and by Guinean forest–savanna mosaic along the central and northern ends of the range. The Cameroon Highlands form the boundary between the Guinean and Northern Congolian forest–savanna mosaic ecoregions. The highest peak within the ecoregion is Mount Oku (3,011 metres (9,879 ft)). Mount Cameroon is highest mountain in the chain, but its high-elevation forests are designated a separate ecoregion.

== Climate ==
Mean maximum temperatures are below 20 °C due to the effects of altitude, and are cooler than the surrounding lowlands. Average annual rainfall ranges from around 4,000 mm near the coast to 1,800 mm or less further inland. The highlands are an important source of water for both Nigeria and Cameroon.

== Flora ==
The vegetation varies with elevation. Submontane forests extend from approximately 900 metres (2,953 ft) to 2,000 metres (6,562 ft) meters elevation. Above 2,000 metres (6,562 ft) elevation are distinct montane forests and patches of montane grassland, bamboo forest, and subalpine grasslands and shrublands. The ecoregion is characterized by the presence of Afromontane species, which have an archipelago-like distribution across the highlands of Africa and are distinct from the lowland flora. Typical afromontane tree species are Nuxia congesta, Olea capensis, Podocarpus milanjianus, Prunus africana, Myrsine melanophloeos, and Syzygium staudtii.

Submontane forests from 850 to 1600 meters elevation typically have an open canopy. Common trees include species of Alchornea, along with species characteristic of the adjacent lowland plant communities, like semi-deciduous forests (species of Ficus, Santiria, Symphonia, Allanblackia and Anthocleista) and savanna (species of Lannea, Bridelia, Lophira, and Fabaceae). Grasses are abundant in the understorey. From 1600 to 2000 meters, trees from the Euphorbiaceae family predominate, including species of Macaranga, Alchornea, and Mallotus. Savanna and semi-deciduous forest species - Ficus, Lophira, Bridelia, Lannea, and Fabaceae – are also present. The Afromontane genus Astropanax is abundant, and Afromontane species including Olea capensis, Syzygium, Maesa, Meliaceae, and Clematis grow in smaller numbers. Grasses remain common in the understory.

Afromontane forests grow above 2000 meters elevation. Lower montane forests generally have a denser canopy than the submontane and upper montane forests, with fewer grasses in the shady understorey. Trees in the lower Afromontane forests include species of Astropanax, Alchornea, Myrica, and Ilex, and the palm Elaeis guineensis. Nuxia congesta, Olea capensis, and Astropanax are predominant from 2270 to 2500 meters elevation. In the upper montane forest from 2500 to 2945 meters elevation Podocarpus milanjianus and Astropanax are predominant, together with Myrsine melanophloeos, Syzygium, Prunus africana, Ixora, and shrubs and herbs like Isoglossa, Pavetta, Rubus, and Impatiens.

In the northern mountains, including the Adamawa Plateau, Hosséré Vokré, and Alantika mountains, the climate is drier and rainfall is more seasonal. Submontane forests are generally absent, and the Afromontane forests transition directly to savanna. Afromontane forests on the Hosséré Vokré and Alantika mountains are mostly limited to stream valleys and ravines, separated by areas of montane savanna or grassland.

The ericaceous belt is a transition between the upper montane forests and high-elevation grasslands, ranging from approximately 2750 up to 2950 meters elevation. Shrubs and stunted trees of genus Ericaceae, including Erica mannii and Erica silvatica, are predominant.

Subalpine grasslands grow above 2800 meters elevation, with many grasses, and herbs in the genera Alchemilla and Anthospermum and the families Caryophyllaceae, Asteraceae, and Lamiaceae.

== Fauna ==
The ecoregion is home to a number of endemic species, along with several more that are also found in the nearby Mount Cameroon and Bioko montane forests ecoregion.

Six species of birds are strictly endemic: the Bamenda apalis (Apalis bamendae), white-throated mountain-babbler (Kupeornis gilberti), banded wattle-eye (Platysteira laticincta), Bannerman's weaver (Ploceus bannermani), Mount Kupe bush-shrike (Telophorus kupeensis) and Bannerman's turaco (Tauraco bannermani), which is a cultural icon for the Kom people who live in the area. Seven species are endemic to the Cameroon Highlands forests and Mount Cameroon: Cameroon greenbul (Arizelocichla montana), Bangwa forest warbler (Bradypterus bangwaensis), grey-headed greenbul (Phyllastrephus poliocephalus), yellow-breasted boubou (Laniarius atroflavus), green-breasted bushshrike (Malaconotus gladiator), mountain robin-chat (Cossyphicula isabellae) and a subspecies of Chubb's cisticola, Cisticola chubbi discolor (sometimes considered a separate species C. discolor). Nine more montane endemic species are shared with Mount Cameroon and Bioko: the western greenbul (Arizelocichla tephrolaema), Cameroon olive greenbul (Phyllastrephus poensis), black-capped woodland warbler (Phylloscopus herberti), green longtail (Urolais epichlorus), white-tailed warbler (Poliolais lopezi), Cameroon sunbird (Cyanomitra oritis), Ursula's sunbird (Cinnyris ursulae), Shelley's oliveback (Nesocharis shelleyi), and Cameroon olive-pigeon (Columba sjostedti).

Eleven small mammal species are endemic to the ecoregion: Eisentraut's striped mouse (Hybomys eisentrauti), the Mount Oku hylomyscus (Hylomyscus grandis), Mount Oku rat (Lamottemys okuensis), Mittendorf's striped grass mouse (Lemniscomys mittendorfi), Dieterlen's brush-furred mouse (Lophuromys dieterleni) and Eisentraut's brush-furred rat (L. eisentrauti), Oku mouse shrew (Myosorex okuensis,) Rumpi mouse shrew (M. rumpii), western vlei rat (Otomys occidentalis), Hartwig's soft-furred mouse (Praomys hartwigi), and Bioko forest shrew (Sylvisorex isabellae).

The ecoregion is home to several endangered primates, including the Cross River gorilla (Gorilla gorilla diehli), an endemic subspecies of western gorilla, mainland drill (Mandrillus leucophaeus leucophaeus), Preuss's red colobus (Pilocolobus preussi), chimpanzee (Pan troglodytes) and several species of guenon including Preuss's monkey (Cercopithecus preussi).

Forty species of amphibians are endemic to the ecoregion: Petropedetes parkeri, Petropedetes perreti, Phrynobatrachus cricogaster, Phrynobatrachus steindachneri, Phrynobatrachus werneri, Phrynobatrachus species, Phrynodon species, Cardioglossa melanogaster, Cardioglossa oreas, Cardioglossa pulchra, Cardioglossa schioetzi, Cardioglossa trifasciata, Cardioglossa venusta, Astylosternus nganhanus, Astylosternus perreti, Astylosternus montanus, Astylosternus rheophilus, Leptodactylodon axillaris, Leptodactylodon bicolor, Leptodactylodon boulengeri, Leptodactylodon erythrogaster, Leptodactylodon mertensi, Leptodactylodon polyacanthus, Leptodactylodon perreti, Afrixalus lacteus, Hyperolius ademetzi, Hyperolius riggenbachi, Leptopelis nordequatorialis, Xenopus amieti, Xenopus species, Bufo villiersi, Werneria bambutensis, Werneria tandyi, Wolterstorffina mirei.

The following reptiles are also considered more or less endemic: Atractaspis coalescens, Pfeffer's chameleon (Trioceros pfefferi), four-horned chameleon (Trioceros quadricornis), Leptosiaphos ianthinoxantha and Angel's five-toed skink (Lacertaspis lepesmei). The gecko Ancylodactylus alantika is endemic to the Alantika Mountains and Hosséré Vokré.

== Urban areas and settlements ==
In Cameroon the mountains are quite heavily populated and used for farming and grazing; much of this ecoregion lies in the Northwest and Adamawa Regions. Towns include Bamenda, capital of the Northwest and base for visiting the mountains including Oku, the Kilum-Ijim Forest and Lake Nyos. In Nigeria the ecoregion is located mainly on the Mambila Plateau, an area of agricultural and grazing land in Taraba State.

== Conservation and threats ==
The forest is continually being cleared for firewood, timber and to create farmland, and many of the mountains have lost significant amounts of forest cover. There is very little formal environmental protection.

== Protected areas ==
6.9% of the ecoregion is in protected areas. Protected areas include Gashaka-Gumti National Park, Santchou Faunal Reserve, Gangoro Forest Reserve, Ngel-Nyaki Forest Reserve, .
