= Leptodactylodon bueanus =

Conservation status
- Endangered (IUCN 3.1)

Scientific classification
- Kingdom: Animalia
- Phylum: Chordata
- Class: Amphibia
- Order: Anura
- Family: Arthroleptidae
- Genus: Leptodactylodon
- Species: L. bueanus

Binomial name
- Leptodactylodon bueanus Amiet, 1981

Synonyms
- Leptodactylodon albiventris bueanus Amiet, 1981 "1980"

Species of amphibian

Leptodactylodon bueanus is a species of frogs in the family Arthroleptidae. It is endemic to western Cameroon and known from the eastern slope of Mount Cameroon and from Bimbia Hill near Limbe. It was originally described as a subspecies of Leptodactylodon albiventris and is also similar to Leptodactylodon stevarti.

== Description ==
Adult males measure 24–27 mm (0.9–1.1 in) in snout–vent length. The dorsum is brown anteriorly and beige posteriorly. The thighs are brown. The venter is clear and the throat is blackish with white spots. Gular folds are present. Breeding males have three (but occasionally only 1–2) metacarpal spines.

== Habitat and conservation ==
Leptodactylodon bueanus occurs in and around streams and springs in forest at elevations of 200–1,000 m (660–3,280 ft) above sea level, often sheltering in rocky areas. The tadpoles develop in streams. Leptodactylodon bueanus is locally abundant and is typically found in degraded forest, but requires dense vegetation in order to survive. It is probably threatened by habitat loss caused by smallholder farming activities, subsistence wood extraction, and human settlements. There are no records from protected areas.
