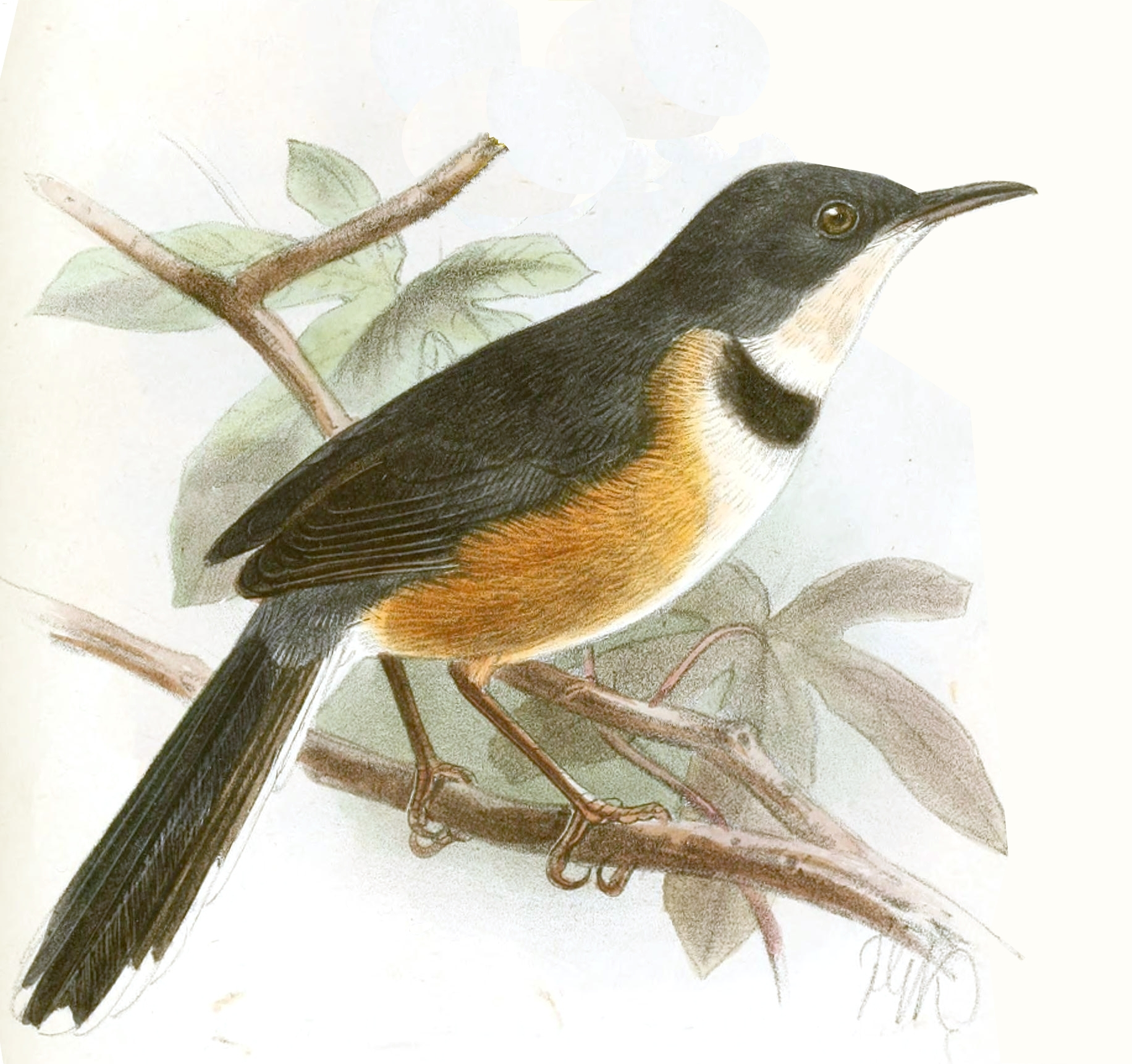
- Oreolais pulcher

Scientific classification
- Kingdom: Animalia
- Phylum: Chordata
- Class: Aves
- Order: Passeriformes
- Family: Cisticolidae
- Genus: Oreolais; Nguembock, Fjeldså, Couloux, Cruaud & Pasquet, 2008

Type species
- Apalis pulchra Sharpe, 1891

Species
- 2, see text

= Oreolais =

Genus of birds

Oreolais is a genus of birds in the family Cisticolidae. It contains species that were previously placed in the genus Apalis.

The genus consists of the following two species:

Image	Common name	Scientific name	Distribution
	Black-collared apalis	Oreolais pulcher	Cameroonian Highlands forests, western Kenya and the Albertine rift montane forests.
	Rwenzori apalis	Oreolais ruwenzorii	Burundi, Democratic Republic of the Congo, Rwanda, and Uganda.
