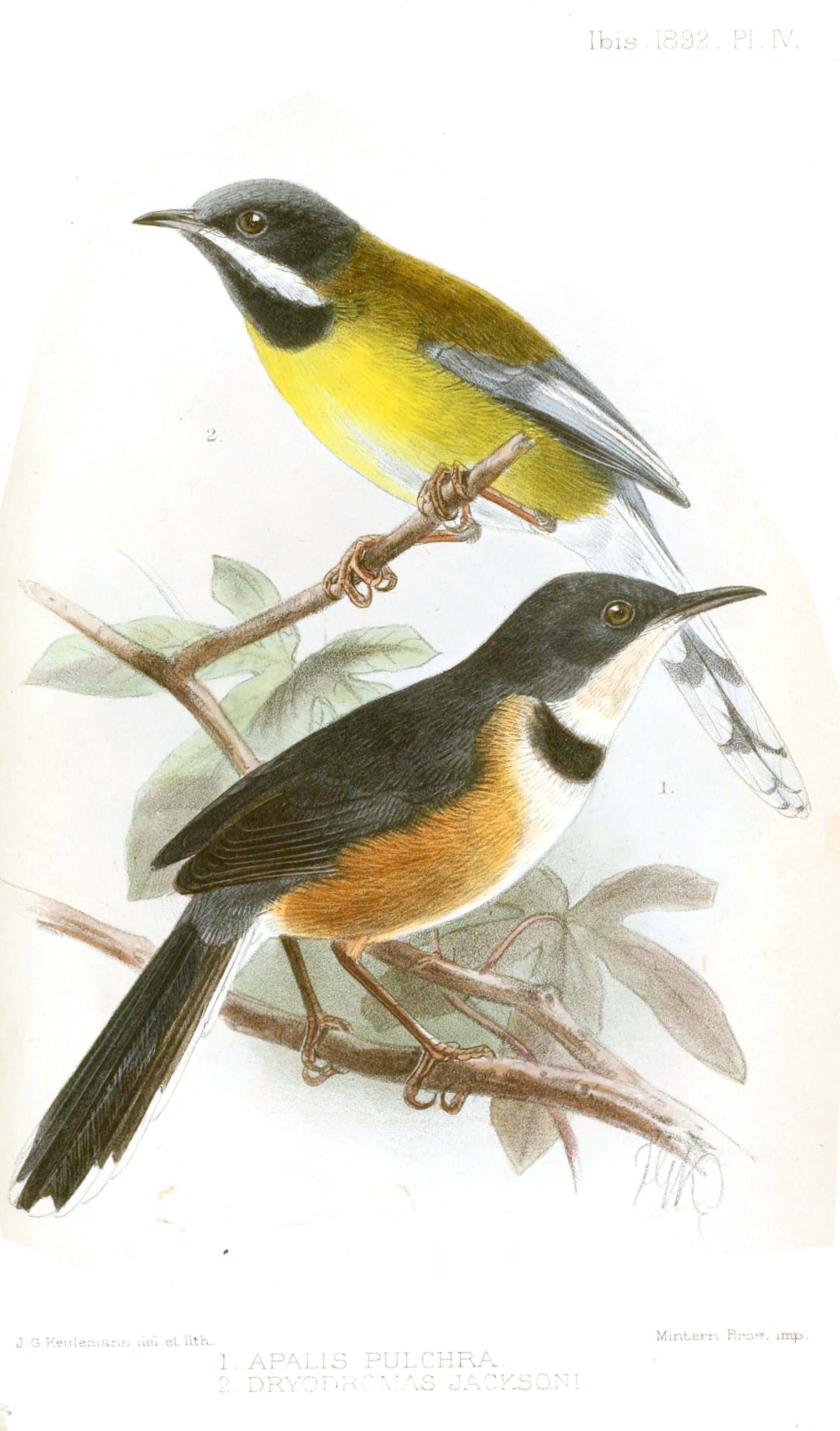
- Illustration (lower bird) by J. G. Keulemans (1892)
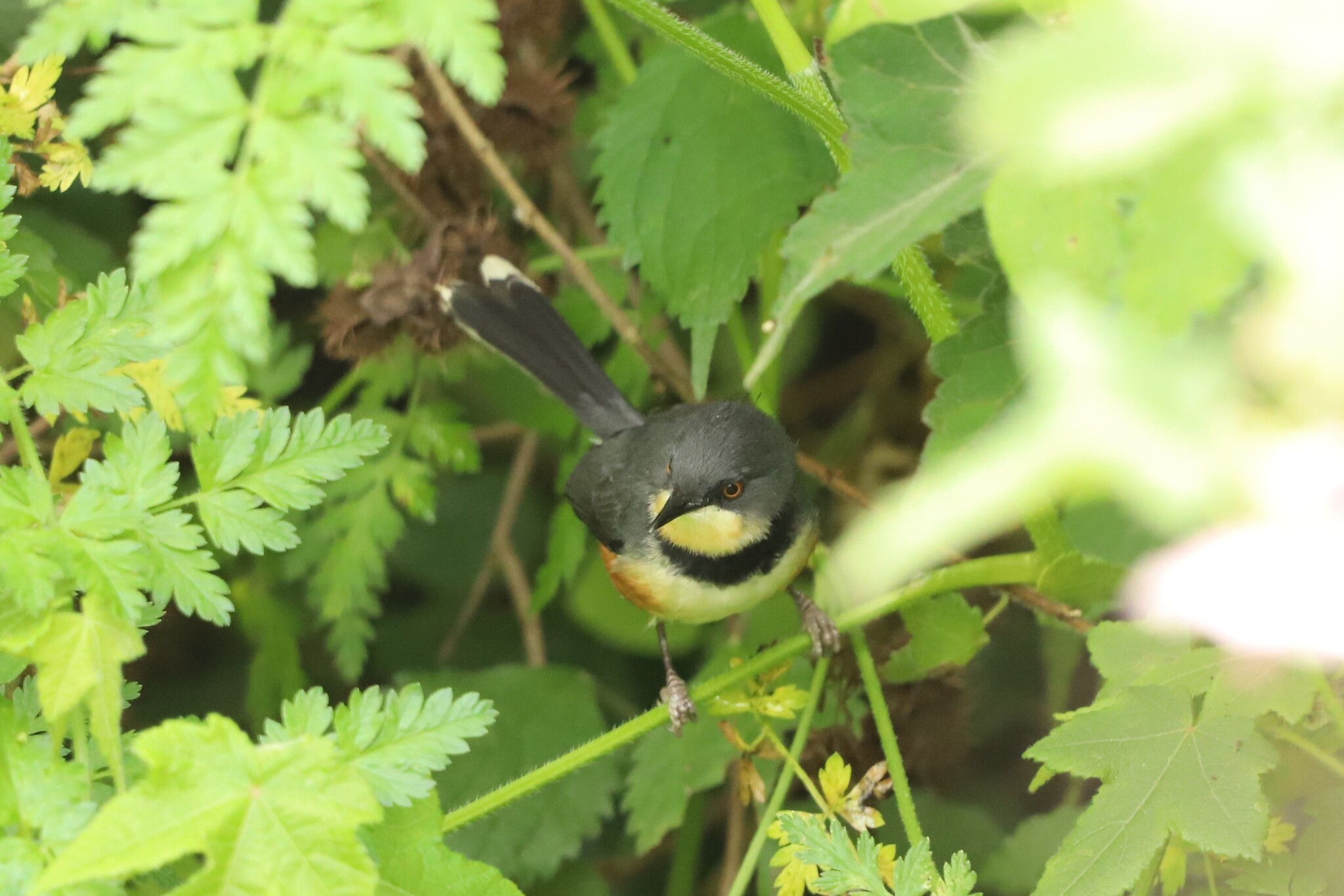

Conservation status
- Least Concern (IUCN 3.1)

Scientific classification
- Kingdom: Animalia
- Phylum: Chordata
- Class: Aves
- Order: Passeriformes
- Family: Cisticolidae
- Genus: Oreolais
- Species: O. pulcher

Binomial name
- Oreolais pulcher (Sharpe, 1891)

Synonyms
- Apalis pulchra

= Black-collared apalis =

Species of bird

The black-collared apalis (Oreolais pulcher) is a species of bird in the family Cisticolidae. It is found in the Cameroonian Highlands forests, western Kenya and the Albertine rift montane forests.

The black-collared apalis was formerly placed in the genus Apalis but was moved to the new genus Oreolais when Apalis was shown to be polyphyletic.
