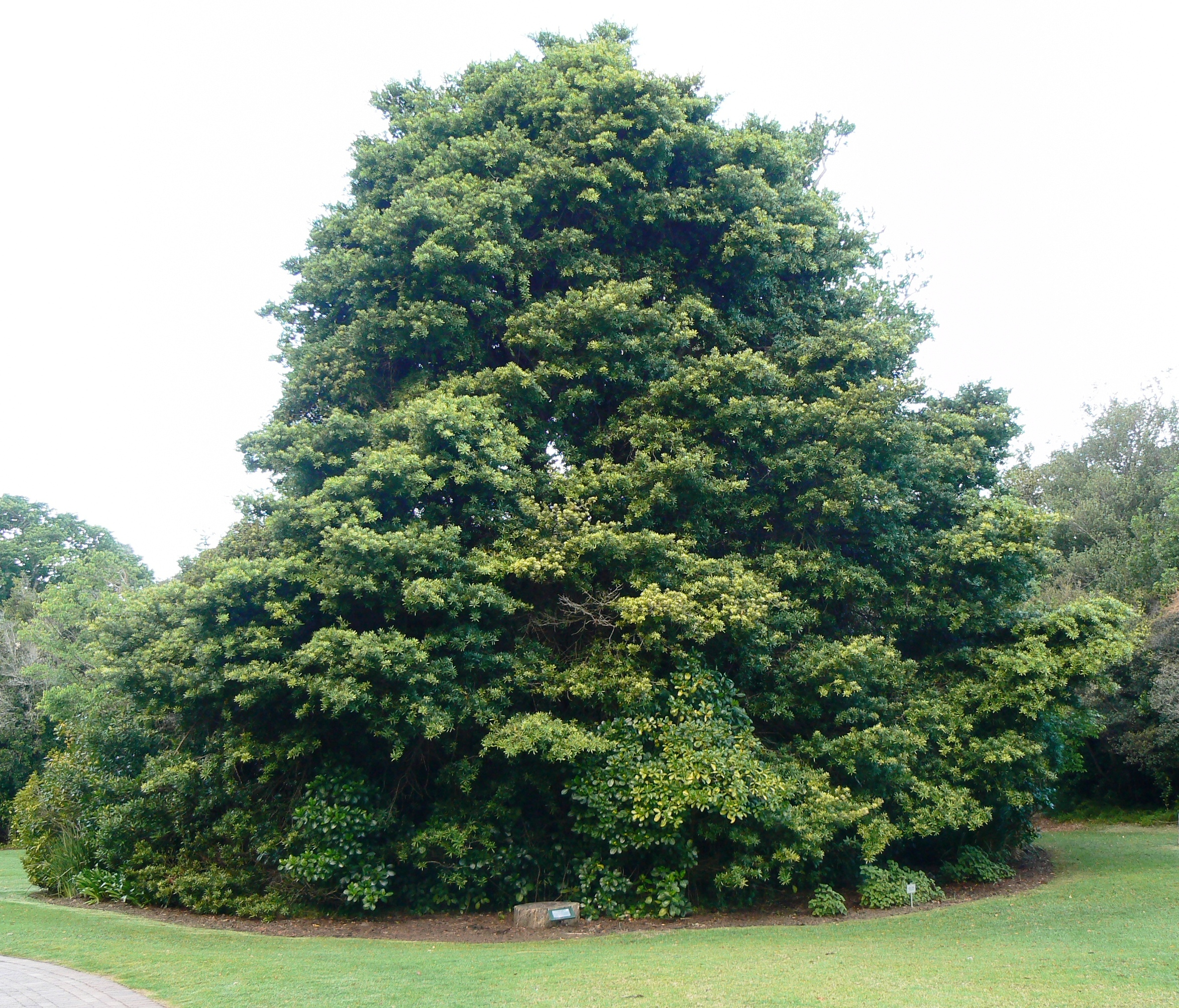
- A mature Podocarpus latifolius growing in a Cape Town botanical garden.

Conservation status
- Least Concern (IUCN 3.1)

Scientific classification
- Kingdom: Plantae
- Clade: Tracheophytes
- Clade: Gymnosperms
- Division: Pinophyta
- Class: Pinopsida
- Order: Araucariales
- Family: Podocarpaceae
- Genus: Podocarpus
- Species: P. latifolius

Binomial name
- Podocarpus latifolius (Thunb.) R.Br. ex Mirb.

Synonyms
- Nageia latifolia (Thunb.) Kuntze, nom. illeg. homonym. post.; Nageia thunbergii (Hook.) F.Muell.; Podocarpus latifolius var. confertus Pilg.; Podocarpus latifolius var. latior Pilg.; Podocarpus latifolius subsp. latior (Pilg.) Silba; Podocarpus latior (Pilg.) Gaussen, not validly publ.; Podocarpus nobilis Endl., not validly publ.; Podocarpus pinnatus Gordon & Glend., not validly publ.; Podocarpus thunbergii Hook., nom. illeg. superfl.; Taxus latifolia Thunb.

= Podocarpus latifolius =

Species of conifer

Podocarpus latifolius (real yellowwood, broad-leaved yellowwood, or South African yellowwood, Afrikaans: Opregte-geelhout, Northern Sotho: Mogôbagôba, Xhosa: Umcheya, Zulu: Umkhoba) is a large coniferous tree growing up to 35 m tall and 3 m in trunk diameter. It is the type species of the genus Podocarpus.

The real yellowwood is the national tree of South Africa and is protected there.

== Appearance ==
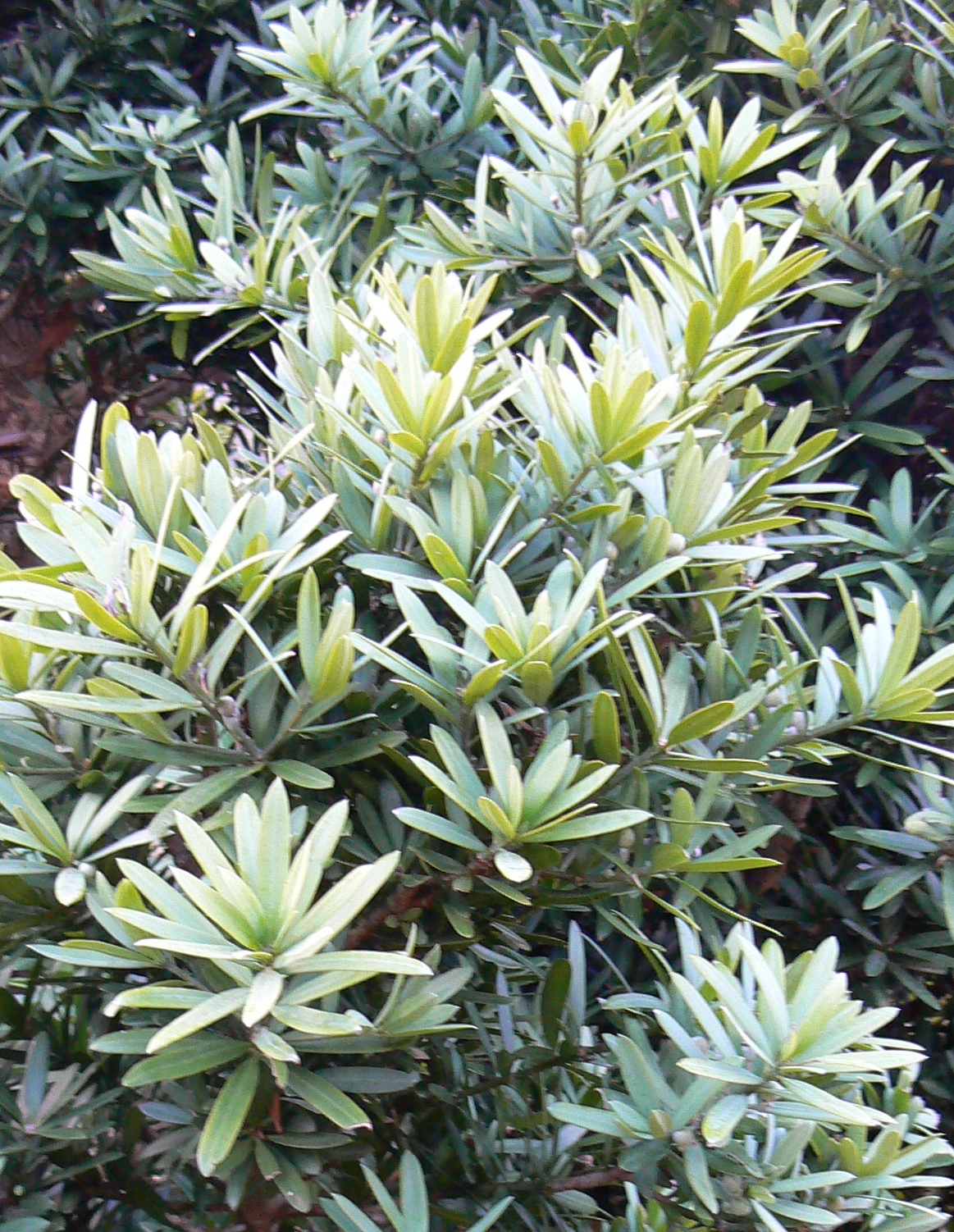
Detail of the characteristic foliage of the real yellowwood

The real yellowwood is a large coniferous tree that grows up to 30 meters in height. It grows relatively slowly but forms a wood of exceptional quality.

The leaves are strap-shaped, 25–40 mm long on mature trees or up to 100 mm long on young trees, and 6–12 mm broad, with a bluntly pointed tip. The species name "latifolius" is Latin for "broad-leaved". The bright-coloured foliage of new growth stands out against the dark leaves of mature foliage.

The cones of this dioecious tree are berry-like, with a single (rarely two) 7–11 mm seed apical on an 8–14 mm pink-purple aril; the aril is edible and sweet. The male (pollen) cones are 10–30 mm long.

== Distribution ==
It is native to the moister southern and eastern areas of South Africa, from coastal areas of the Western Cape east to KwaZulu-Natal and north to eastern Limpopo, and to Eswatini and Lesotho.

It is commonly found in afro-temperate forests and often in mountainous areas. In harsh or exposed areas it tends to become stunted, small and dense.

== Ecology ==
Podocarpus latifolius is the preferred phorophyte species of Solenangis conica, an epiphytic orchid.

== Human usage ==
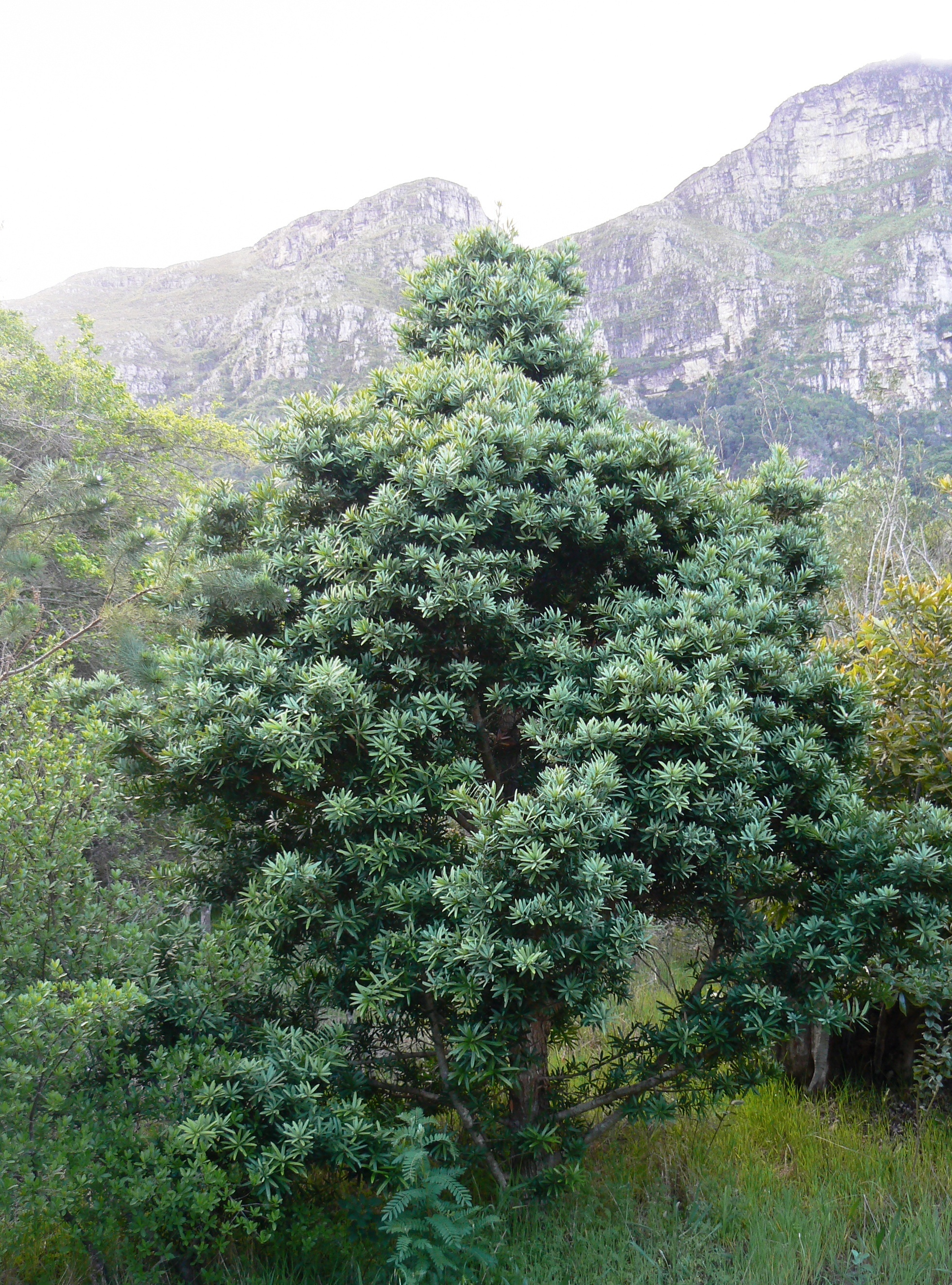
A young specimen growing on the slopes of Table Mountain

It is a slow-growing tree but exceptionally long-lived, and is increasingly grown as an ornamental feature in South African gardens. The unusual texture of the foliage is a reason for its growing popularity. The bright edible berries attract birds, which spread the seed.

The wood is hard, similar to yew wood, used for furniture, panelling, etc. Due to past over-exploitation, little is now cut.

== Taxonomy ==
=== Relationship to Podocarpus milanjianus ===
Podocarpus latifolius is closely related to Podocarpus milanjianus. Whether they are a single or two separate species is not settled. Some authorities treat the South African populations as Podocarpus latifolius, and those elsewhere in Africa as Podocarpus milanjianus. Others treat them as a single species, Podocarpus latifolius.

A 2020 study sampled DNA from Podocarpus latifolius and Podocarpus milanjianus trees, gathered from 88 sites across Africa. They concluded that all populations sampled constituted a single species: "As South African samples (P. latifolius) did not form a clade separated from the other clades (P. milanjianus), we confirm that the two taxa can be considered as synonyms." The authors concluded that the species originated in East Africa. The western populations, in the highlands of Cameroon and Nigeria and in the Angolan highlands, diverged from the other populations around 300,000 years ago, and the species expanded to its current distribution pattern about 200,000 years ago.
