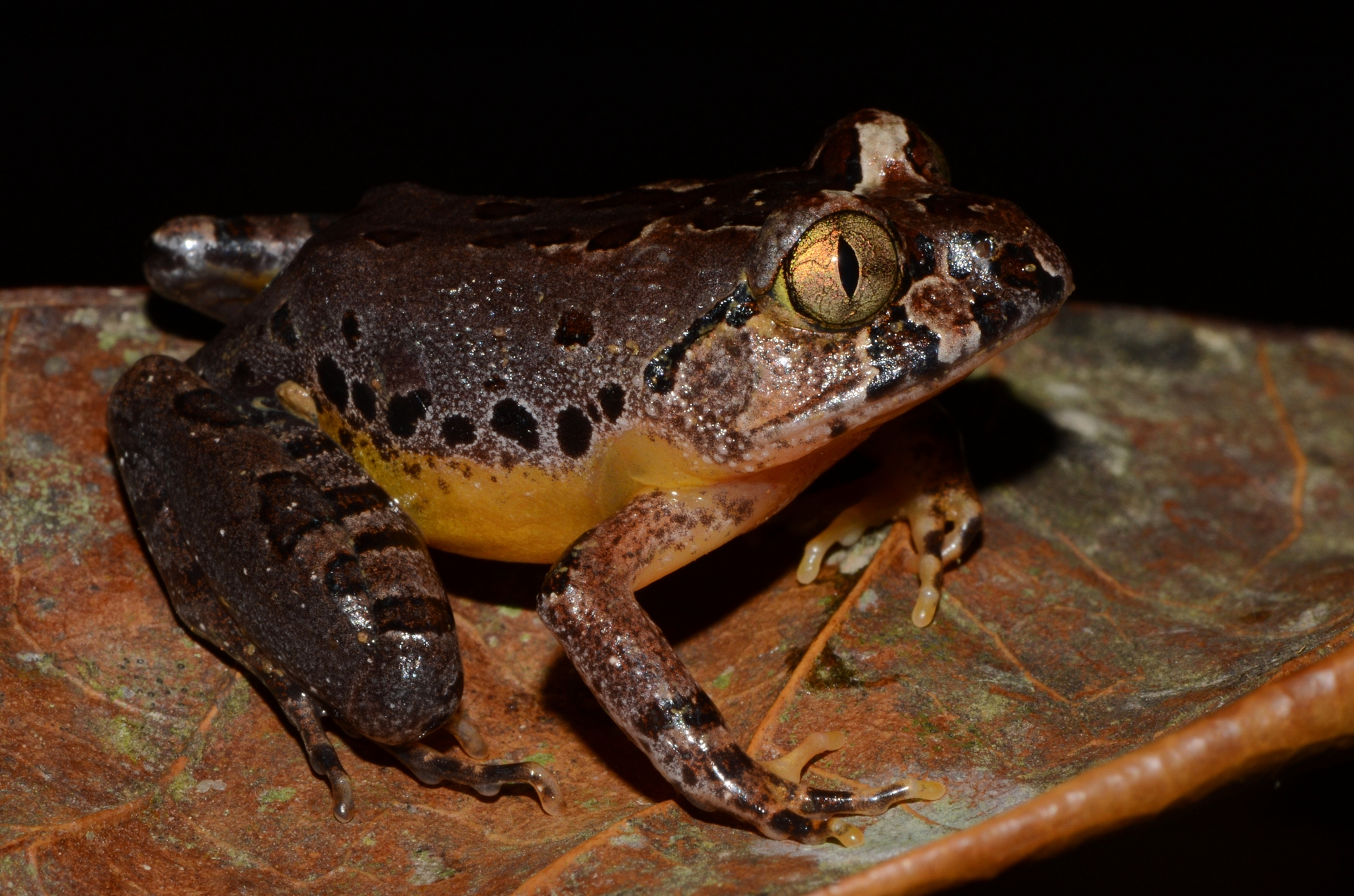

Conservation status
- Least Concern (IUCN 3.1)

Scientific classification
- Kingdom: Animalia
- Phylum: Chordata
- Class: Amphibia
- Order: Anura
- Family: Arthroleptidae
- Genus: Astylosternus
- Species: A. batesi

Binomial name
- Astylosternus batesi (Boulenger, 1900)

Synonyms
- Gampsosteonyx batesi Boulenger, 1900; Dilobates platycephalus Boulenger, 1900

= Astylosternus batesi =

Species of frog

Astylosternus batesi is a species of frog in the family Arthroleptidae. It is found in Cameroon south of Sanaga River, Equatorial Guinea, Gabon, southwestern Central African Republic, the Republic of the Congo, and the extreme western Democratic Republic of the Congo (Mayombe). The specific name batesi honours George Latimer Bates, an American naturalist. However, its vernacular name is Benito River night frog, apparently in reference to its type locality, Benito River in Equatorial Guinea.

== Description ==
Astylosternus batesi was described based on a single specimen (holotype) that measures 70 mm (2.8 in) in snout–vent length. The head is large, much broader than it is long. The snout is broadly rounded. The eyes are large. The tympanum is very distinct, oval, and slightly smaller than the eye; a glandular fold is present above it. Skin is smooth and shiny. Fingers and toes have slightly swollen tips; no webbing is present. The terminal phalange of all but the innermost toe have a sharp, curved non-retractile bony claw (a trait shared by all species in the genus). The dorsum is dark purplish brown. The venter is white. A black canthal and temporal streaks are present; a black transverse line runs between the eyes. The upper lip has two dark bars. Limbs have rather indistinct dark cross-bars.

== Habitat and conservation ==
Its natural habitats are subtropical or tropical moist lowland forests, rivers, and heavily degraded former forest. It is threatened by habitat loss.
