= Werneria submontana =

Conservation status
- Endangered (IUCN 3.1)

Scientific classification
- Kingdom: Animalia
- Phylum: Chordata
- Class: Amphibia
- Order: Anura
- Family: Bufonidae
- Genus: Werneria
- Species: W. submontana

Binomial name
- Werneria submontana Rödel, Schmitz, Pauwels, and Böhme, 2004

Species of amphibian

Werneria submontana is a species of toad in the family Bufonidae. It is endemic to western Cameroon and is known from Mount Kupe and the Bakossi Mountains. It is found at elevations of 800 to 1,200 m (2,600 to 3,900 ft) above sea level, but there are tentative records from lower elevations, perhaps down to 300 m (980 ft). It has been found in association with rivers (under rocks in a partly dried-up river basin, and on stony ground among low vegetation in the spray zone of a small, artificial waterfall). The species can be locally abundant but is threatened by habitat loss. Parts of its range receive protection from the Bakossi Forest Reserve.
