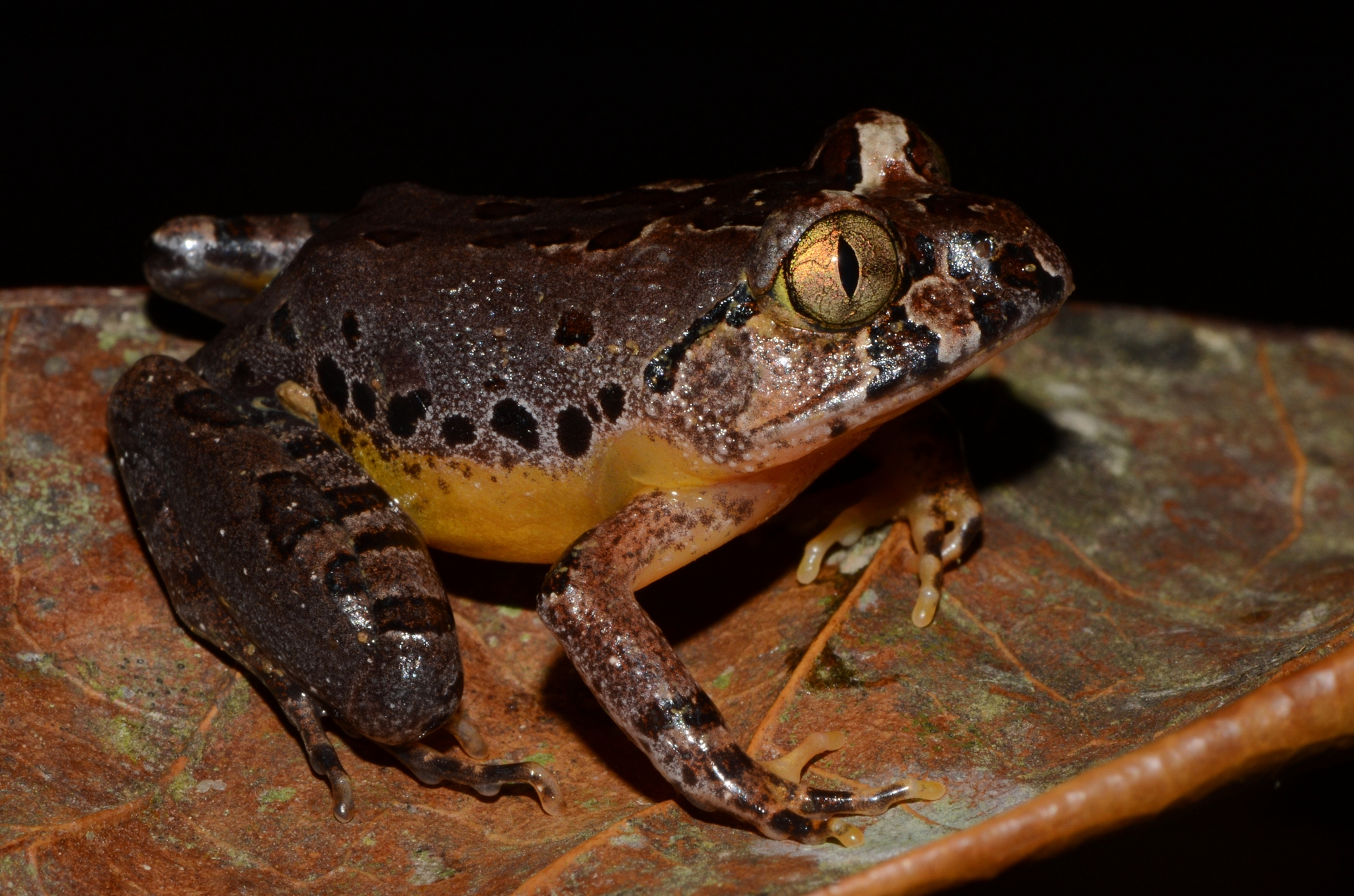
- Astylosternus batesi

Scientific classification
- Kingdom: Animalia
- Phylum: Chordata
- Class: Amphibia
- Order: Anura
- Family: Arthroleptidae
- Subfamily: Astylosterninae
- Genus: Astylosternus; Werner, 1898

Type species
- Astylosternus diadematus Werner, 1898

Diversity
- 12 species (see text)

Synonyms
- Gampsosteonyx Boulenger, 1900; Dilobates Boulenger, 1900

= Astylosternus =

Genus of amphibians

Astylosternus (commonly known as night frogs) is a genus of frogs in the family Arthroleptidae. It contains 12 species found in an area spanning from Sierra Leone in West Africa to the Democratic Republic of Congo in Central Africa, with a gap in the region of Ghana.

== Species ==
As traditionally defined, there are 12 species (as listed below), but based on genetic evidence recent authorities also include the hairy frog (Astylosternus robustus; formerly Trichobatrachus robustus).

Common name	Binomial name
River night frog	Astylosternus batesi (Boulenger, 1900)
Victoria night frog	Astylosternus diadematus Werner, 1898
Fopouanga night frog	Astylosternus fallax Amiet, 1978
	Astylosternus laticephalus Rödel et al., 2012
Laurent's night frog	Astylosternus laurenti Amiet, 1978
Mountain night frog	Astylosternus montanus Amiet, 1978
Nganha night frog	Astylosternus nganhanus Amiet, 1978
Western night frog	Astylosternus occidentalis Parker, 1931
Perret's night frog	Astylosternus perreti Amiet, 1978
Central night frog	Astylosternus ranoides Amiet, 1978
Cameroon Range night frog	Astylosternus rheophilus Amiet, 1978
Apouh night frog	Astylosternus schioetzi Amiet, 1978
