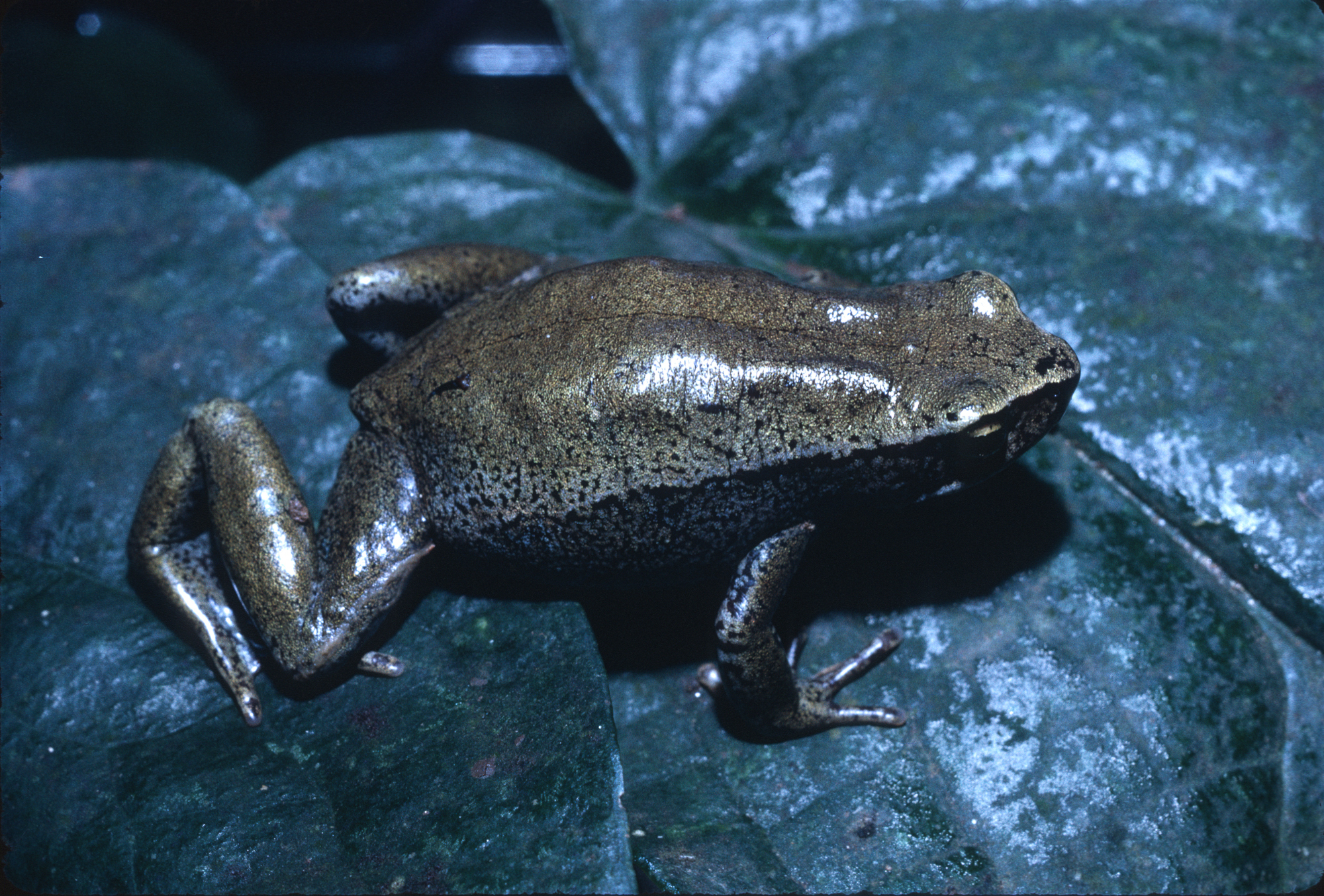
- Bambuto torrent toad

Scientific classification
- Kingdom: Animalia
- Phylum: Chordata
- Class: Amphibia
- Order: Anura
- Family: Bufonidae
- Genus: Werneria; Poche, 1903

Species
- 6 species (see text)

Synonyms
- Stenoglossa Andersson, 1903 – preoccupied by Stenoglossa Chaudoir (Coleoptera); Werneria Poche, 1903 – replacement name; Mo Dubois, Ohler, and Pyron, 2021

= Werneria =

Genus of amphibians

Werneria, also known as the torrent toads or smalltongue toads, is a small genus of "true toads", family Bufonidae. They are found in western Central Africa (Equatorial Guinea, Gabon, and Cameroon), with the greatest species richness in the Western High Plateau of Cameroon. The species generally have restricted or patchy distributions and are considered threatened.

== Etymology ==
The genus is named after Franz Werner, Austrian zoologist and herpetologist who was active in Africa.

== Description ==
Werneria are medium-sized toads with a snout-to-vent length between 3 and 5 cm (1.2–2.0 in); females tend to be larger than males. They do not have hearing organs, vocal sacs (they are silent), nor parotoid glands. Skin is smooth. Toe webbing ranges from rudimentary to full. Tadpoles have a short, muscular tail and a flat body with a huge sucker mouth.

== Species ==
Binomial name and author	Common name
Werneria bambutensis (Amiet, 1972)	Bamboutos smalltongue toad, Bambuto torrent toad
Werneria iboundji Rödel, Schmitz, Pauwels & Böhme, 2004	Iboundji torrent toad
Werneria mertensiana Amiet, 1976	Mertens' smalltongue toad, Mertens' torrent toad
Werneria preussi (Matschie, 1893)	Buea smalltongue toad, Preuss' torrent toad
Werneria submontana Rödel, Schmitz, Pauwels & Böhme, 2004	hill torrent toad
Werneria tandyi (Amiet, 1972)	Tandy's smalltongue toad, Tandy's torrent toad

== Habitat ==
Werneria are associated with torrential forest streams, which also is their breeding habitat. Tadpoles use their sucker mouth to cling to the rocks. Outside the breeding season, adult toads can be found in leaf litter far away from streams. They are known from altitudes between 560–2,600 m (1,840–8,530 ft)
