= Leptodactylodon ventrimarmoratus =

Conservation status
- Vulnerable (IUCN 3.1)

Scientific classification
- Kingdom: Animalia
- Phylum: Chordata
- Class: Amphibia
- Order: Anura
- Family: Arthroleptidae
- Genus: Leptodactylodon
- Species: L. ventrimarmoratus

Binomial name
- Leptodactylodon ventrimarmoratus (Boulenger, 1904)

Species of frog

Leptodactylodon ventrimarmoratus is a species of frog in the family Arthroleptidae. It is endemic to Cameroon. Its natural habitats are subtropical or tropical moist lowland forests, subtropical or tropical moist montane forests, rivers, freshwater springs, and rocky areas. It is threatened by habitat loss.
