= Leptodactylodon ornatus =

Conservation status
- Endangered (IUCN 3.1)

Scientific classification
- Kingdom: Animalia
- Phylum: Chordata
- Class: Amphibia
- Order: Anura
- Family: Arthroleptidae
- Genus: Leptodactylodon
- Species: L. ornatus

Binomial name
- Leptodactylodon ornatus Amiet, 1971

Synonyms
- Leptodactylodon ornatus Amiet, 1971 "1970"

Species of frog

Leptodactylodon ornatus is a species of frog in the family Arthroleptidae. It is endemic to western Cameroon. Common name ornate egg frog has been proposed for it.

Two subspecies may be distinguished:

- Leptodactylodon ornatus ornatus Amiet, 1971 – Mount Manengouba, Mount Nlonako, Mount Kupe, the Bonandam Hills and the Ebonji Hills
- Leptodactylodon ornatus permaculatus Amiet, 1971 – southern and western slopes of the Bamileke Plateau at Fotabong, Foto, and the Mbos Cliffs

Leptodactylodon ornatus is found at low to medium altitudes (200–1,450 m (660–4,760 ft) above sea level) in hilly areas, usually near mountains in areas of high rainfall. It occurs in wet lowland and submontane forests and can also occur in partially degraded forest. Males call from cracks in rocks or from under stones. The tadpoles develop in fast-flowing streams. It is likely to be threatened by habitat loss caused by forest clearance for smallholder farming, expanding human settlements and logging. Chytridiomycosis might also be a threat. It is not known to occur in any protected areas.
