= Leptodactylodon =

Scientific classification
- Kingdom: Animalia
- Phylum: Chordata
- Class: Amphibia
- Order: Anura
- Family: Arthroleptidae
- Subfamily: Astylosterninae
- Genus: Leptodactylodon; Andersson, 1903

Type species
- Leptodactylodon ovatus Andersson, 1903

Diversity
- 15 species (see text)

Synonyms
- Bulua Boulenger, 1904

Genus of amphibians

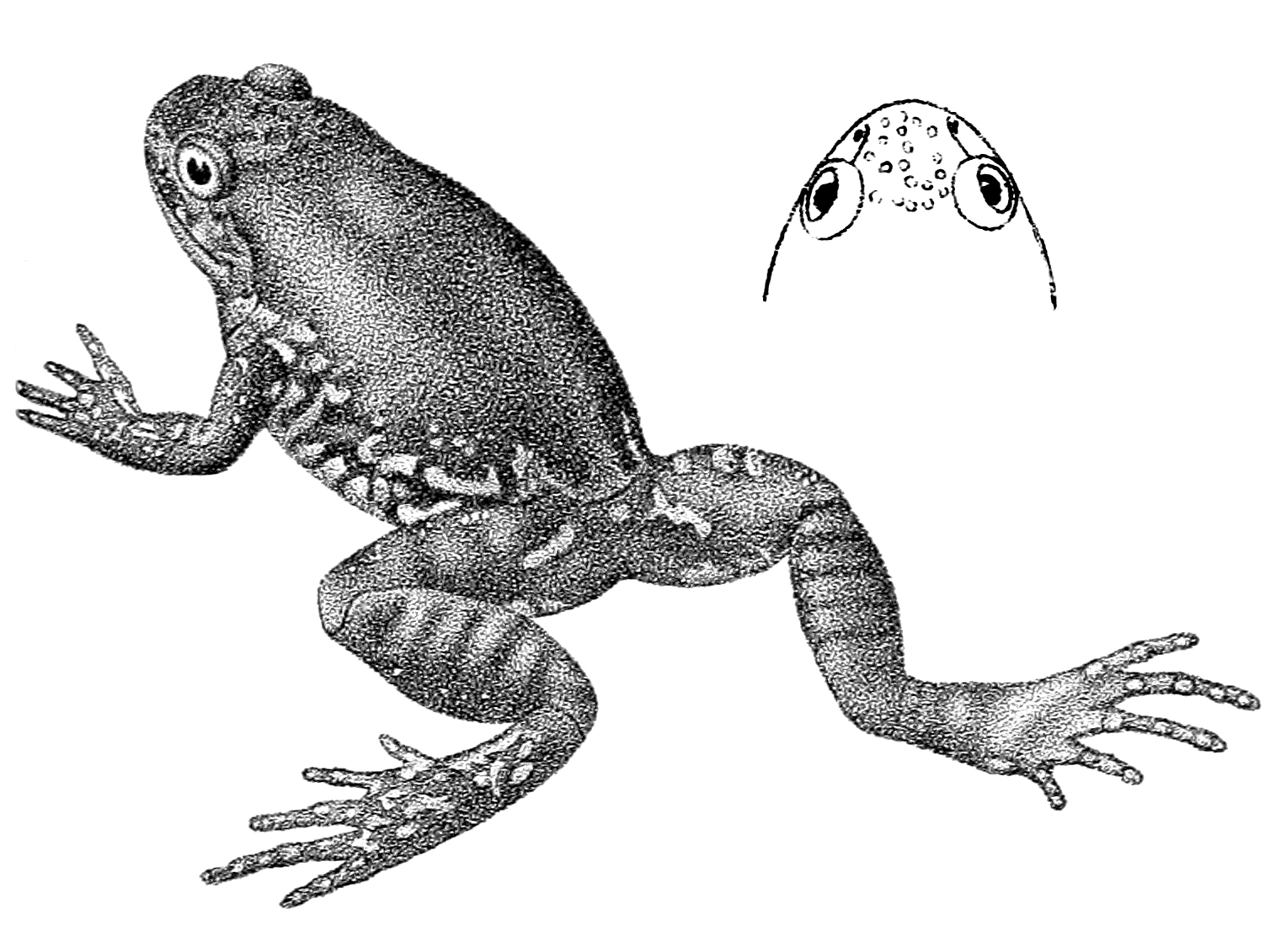
Leptodactylodon ovatus

Leptodactylodon, also known as egg frogs, is a genus of frog in the family Arthroleptidae. It contains 15 species. Members of this genus can be found in eastern Nigeria and western and southwestern Cameroon, Equatorial Guinea, and Gabon.

== Species ==
There are 15 species:

Common name	Binomial name
Whitebelly egg frog	Leptodactylodon albiventris (Boulenger, 1905)
	Leptodactylodon axillaris Amiet, 1971
Mountain egg frog	Leptodactylodon bicolor Amiet, 1971
	Leptodactylodon blanci Ohler, 1999
Boulenger's egg frog	Leptodactylodon boulengeri Nieden, 1910
	Leptodactylodon bueanus Amiet, 1981
Redbelly egg frog	Leptodactylodon erythrogaster Amiet, 1971
Mertens' egg frog	Leptodactylodon mertensi Perret, 1959
Ornate egg frog	Leptodactylodon ornatus Amiet, 1971
Cameroon egg frog	Leptodactylodon ovatus Andersson, 1903
Perret's egg frog	Leptodactylodon perreti Amiet, 1971
African egg frog	Leptodactylodon polyacanthus Amiet, 1971
Stevart's egg frog	Leptodactylodon stevarti Rödel & Pauwels, 2003
Speckled egg frog	Leptodactylodon ventrimarmoratus (Boulenger, 1904)
Wild's egg frog	Leptodactylodon wildi Amiet & Dowsett-Lemaire, 2000
