= Werneria mertensiana =

Conservation status
- Critically Endangered (IUCN 3.1)

Scientific classification
- Kingdom: Animalia
- Phylum: Chordata
- Class: Amphibia
- Order: Anura
- Family: Bufonidae
- Genus: Werneria
- Species: W. mertensiana

Binomial name
- Werneria mertensiana Amiet, 1976

Synonyms
- Bufo mertensi Amiet, 1972 — junior homonym of Bufo ictericus mertensi Cochran, 1950

Species of amphibian

Werneria mertensiana is a species of toad in the family Bufonidae. It is found in western Cameroon (Mount Nlonako, Mount Manengouba, Mount Kala, possibly Western High Plateau) and possibly in the Obudu Plateau in Nigeria. The specific name mertensiana honours Robert Mertens, a German zoologist and herpetologist. Common name Mertens' smalltongue toad has been coined for it.

Werneria mertensiana is typically found associated with rocks in streams and waterfalls in forest and degraded secondary habitats at the lower limit of the submontane zone, 800–1,050 m (2,620–3,440 ft) above sea level. It can also be found in leaf-litter away from water. It can be locally relatively abundant. The main threat to it is probably habitat loss.
