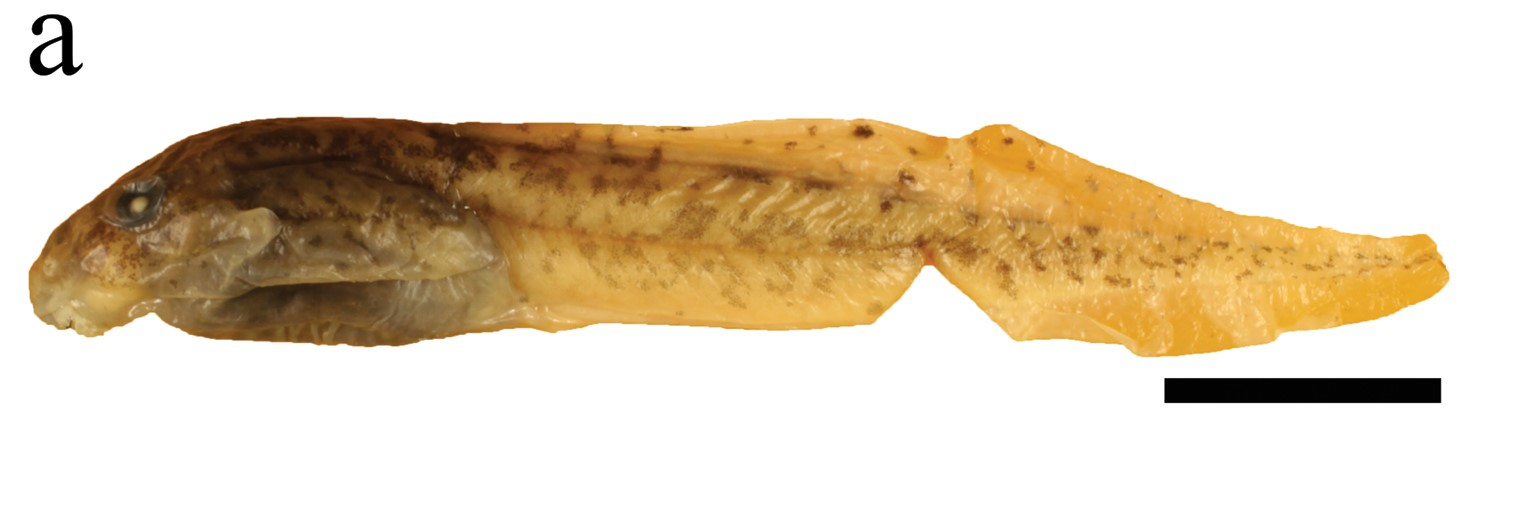
- Tadpole

Conservation status
- Endangered (IUCN 3.1)

Scientific classification
- Kingdom: Animalia
- Phylum: Chordata
- Class: Amphibia
- Order: Anura
- Family: Arthroleptidae
- Genus: Astylosternus
- Species: A. laurenti

Binomial name
- Astylosternus laurenti Amiet, 1978

= Astylosternus laurenti =

Species of frog

Astylosternus laurenti is a species of frog in the family Arthroleptidae. It is endemic to Cameroon. Its natural habitats are subtropical or tropical moist lowland forests and rivers. It is threatened by habitat loss.
