= Astylosternus schioetzi =

Conservation status
- Endangered (IUCN 3.1)

Scientific classification
- Kingdom: Animalia
- Phylum: Chordata
- Class: Amphibia
- Order: Anura
- Family: Arthroleptidae
- Genus: Astylosternus
- Species: A. schioetzi

Binomial name
- Astylosternus schioetzi Amiet, 1978

Species of frog

Astylosternus schioetzi is a species of frog in the family Arthroleptidae. It is endemic to south-western Cameroon and is only known from two areas near Edéa, Apouh and Koupongo, separated by the Sanaga River. The specific name schioetzi honours Arne Schiøtz, a Danish herpetologist who has worked extensively on African tree frogs. Common name Apouh night frog has been coined for this species (Apouh is the type locality).

Astylosternus schioetzi occurs in lowland forests, in and near flowing water. Breeding takes place in small streams, including very small, superficial streams in marshy depressions. It is a rare species threatened by habitat loss and degradation caused clearance for agricultural land, human settlements, and logging. It might occur in the Douala Edéa Wildlife Reserve and in the Lac Ossa Wildlife Reserve.
