= Leptodactylodon blanci =

Conservation status
- Endangered (IUCN 3.1)

Scientific classification
- Kingdom: Animalia
- Phylum: Chordata
- Class: Amphibia
- Order: Anura
- Family: Arthroleptidae
- Genus: Leptodactylodon
- Species: L. blanci

Binomial name
- Leptodactylodon blanci Ohler, 1999

Species of frog

Leptodactylodon blanci is a species of frog in the family Arthroleptidae. It is endemic to Gabon and only known from its type locality, Reserve de Faune de la Lope. The specific name blanci honours Charles Pierre Blanc, a French herpetologist. Common name Lope egg frog has been coined for this species.

This poorly known species is presumed to be associated with rocky places near streams in lowland rainforest. It occurs in a protected area, but if more widely distributed, it would probably be affected by habitat loss.
