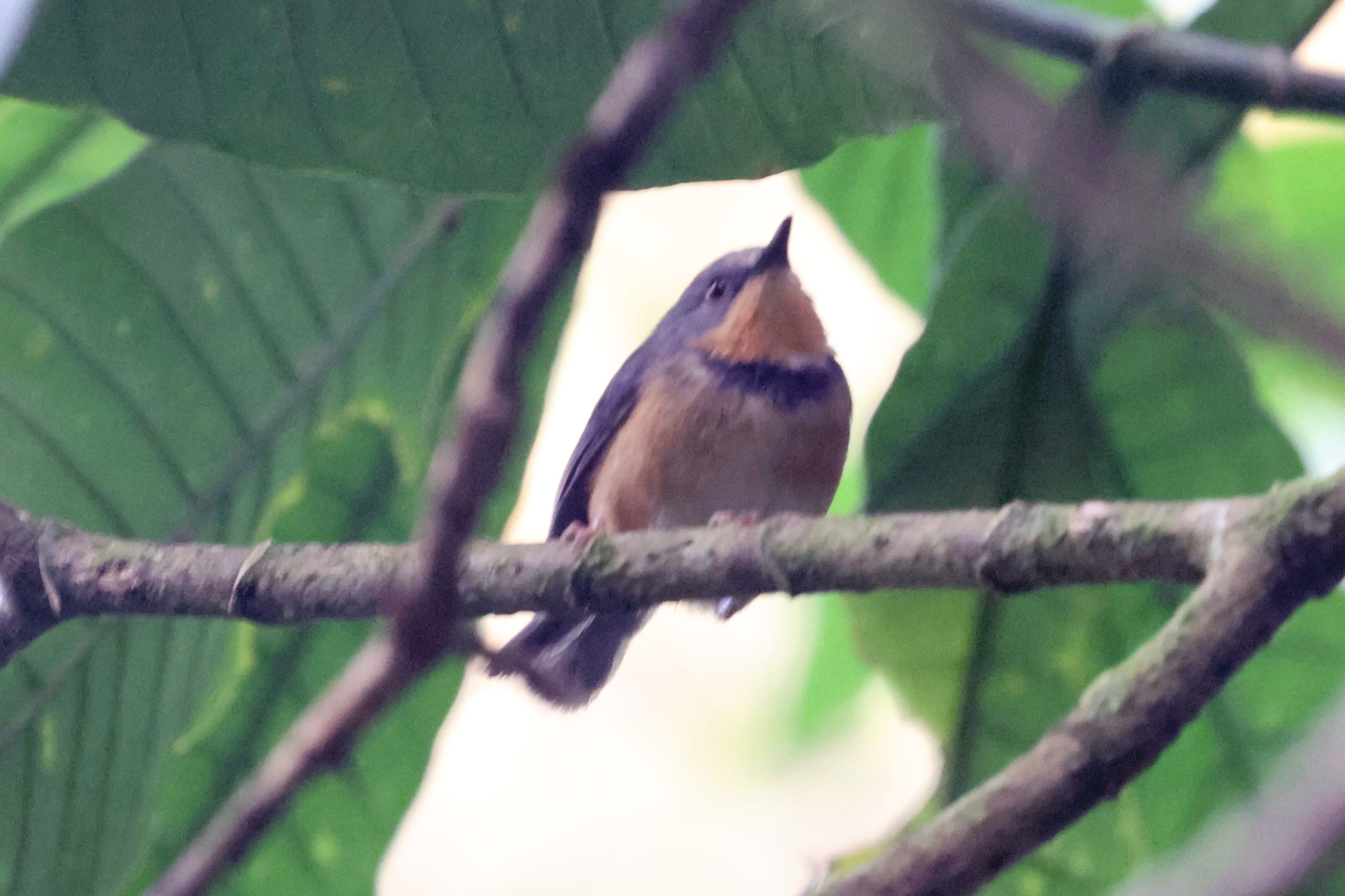

Conservation status
- Least Concern (IUCN 3.1)

Scientific classification
- Kingdom: Animalia
- Phylum: Chordata
- Class: Aves
- Order: Passeriformes
- Family: Cisticolidae
- Genus: Oreolais
- Species: O. ruwenzorii

Binomial name
- Oreolais ruwenzorii (Jackson, 1904)

Synonyms
- Apalis ruwenzorii

= Rwenzori apalis =

Species of bird

The Rwenzori apalis or collared apalis (Oreolais ruwenzorii) is a species of bird in the family Cisticolidae. It is found in Burundi, Democratic Republic of the Congo, Rwanda, and Uganda. Its natural habitat is subtropical or tropical moist montane forest.

The Rwenzori apalis was formerly placed in the genus Apalis but was moved to the new genus Oreolais when Apalis was shown to be polyphyletic.
