= Astylosternus ranoides =

Conservation status
- Endangered (IUCN 3.1)

Scientific classification
- Kingdom: Animalia
- Phylum: Chordata
- Class: Amphibia
- Order: Anura
- Family: Arthroleptidae
- Genus: Astylosternus
- Species: A. ranoides

Binomial name
- Astylosternus ranoides Amiet, 1978

Species of frog

Astylosternus ranoides is a species of frog in the family Arthroleptidae. It is endemic to Cameroon. Its natural habitats are subtropical or tropical moist montane forests, subtropical or tropical high-altitude shrubland, subtropical or tropical high-altitude grassland, rivers, swamps, and freshwater lakes. It is threatened by habitat loss.
