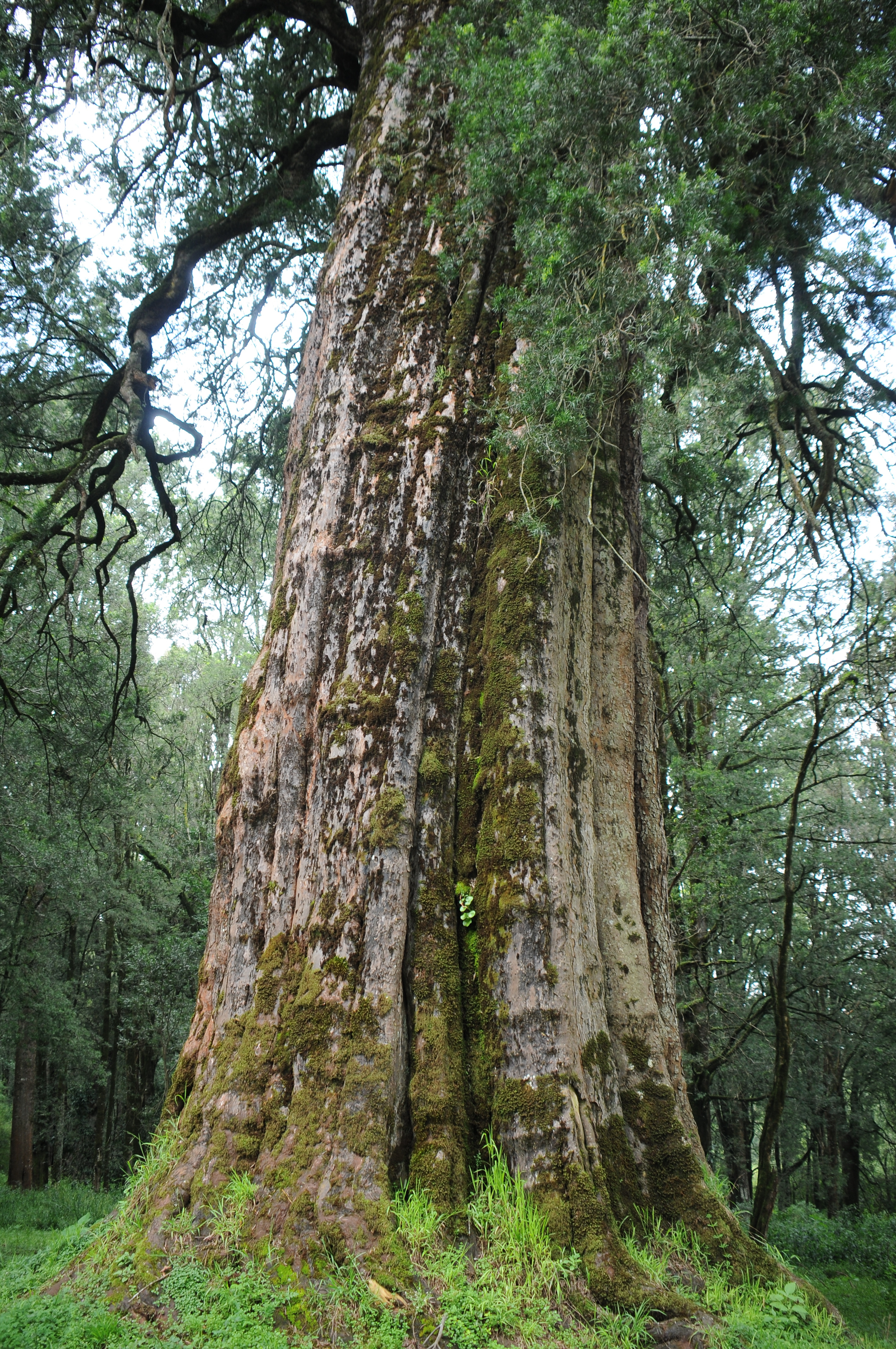
- Podocarpus milanjanus in Mount Elgon National Park, Kenya

Conservation status
- Least Concern (IUCN 3.1)

Scientific classification
- Kingdom: Plantae
- Clade: Tracheophytes
- Clade: Gymnosperms
- Division: Pinophyta
- Class: Pinopsida
- Order: Araucariales
- Family: Podocarpaceae
- Genus: Podocarpus
- Species: P. milanjianus

Binomial name
- Podocarpus milanjianus Rendle

Synonyms
- Afrocarpus falcatus subsp. milanjianus (Rendle) Silba; Podocarpus milanjianus f. arborescens Pilg.; Podocarpus milanjianus var. ulugurensis (Pilg.) Gaussen; Podocarpus ulugurensis Pilg.

= Podocarpus milanjianus =

Species of conifer

Podocarpus milanjianus is a species of conifer in the family Podocarpaceae. It is native to the highlands and mountains of tropical Africa.

== Description ==
Podocarpus milanjianus is a medium-sized coniferous tree which can grow slowly up to 35 meters in height, and up to 40 meters in favorable conditions. It is generally conical in form, with a straight cylindrical trunk. The trunk of mature trees can range from 150 to 300 cm in diameter, and unbranched for the first 10 to 20 meters from the ground. Some trees have a buttressed base. The leaves are narrow, glossy, and bright green.

The trees are dioecious, meaning male and female trees are required to produce cones and seeds.

== Habitat and range ==
Podocarpus milanjianus is the most widespread African podocarp. It is found in Angola, Burundi, Cameroon, Republic of the Congo, Democratic Republic of the Congo, Kenya, Malawi, Mozambique, Nigeria, Rwanda, Sudan, Tanzania, Uganda, Zambia, and Zimbabwe.

It grows in tropical montane (Afromontane) evergreen rainforests, cloud forests, and high-elevation dwarf forests, between 900 and 3,250 meters elevation.

The tree is widespread and locally plentiful, and is rated "least concern" in the IUCN Red List of Threatened Species.

=== Relationship to Podocarpus latifolius ===
Podocarpus milanjianus is closely related to Podocarpus latifolius. Whether they are a single or two separate species is not settled. Some authorities, including Plants of the World Online, treat the South African populations as Podocarpus latifolius, and those elsewhere in Africa as Podocarpus milanjianus. Others treat them as a single species, Podocarpus latifolius.

A 2020 study sampled DNA from Podocarpus latifolius and Podocarpus milanjianus trees, gathered from 88 sites across Africa. They concluded that all populations sampled constituted a single species: "As South African samples (P. latifolius) did not form a clade separated from the other clades (P. milanjianus), we confirm that the two taxa can be considered as synonyms." The authors concluded that the species originated in East Africa. The western populations, in the highlands of Cameroon and Nigeria and in the Angolan highlands, diverged from the other populations around 300,000 years ago, and the species reached its current distribution pattern about 200,000 years ago.

== Uses ==
Podocarpus milanjianus is valued as a timber tree, both commercially and artisanally. It produces straight pale yellow timber, which is fine-grained and easily sawn and worked.

The tree is used to provide shade in tea, coffee, cocoa, and banana plantations, in reforestation projects, and as a roadside or ornamental tree.

Parts of the tree have minor local uses as food (the fleshy receptacles at the seed base) or medicine (bark or leaves).
