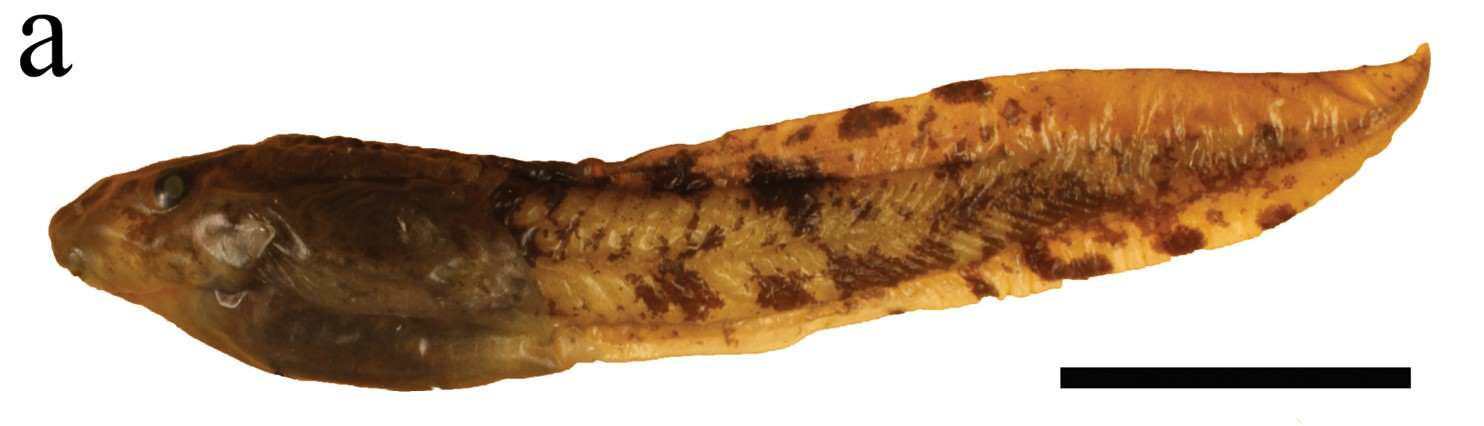
- Tadpole

Conservation status
- Vulnerable (IUCN 3.1)

Scientific classification
- Kingdom: Animalia
- Phylum: Chordata
- Class: Amphibia
- Order: Anura
- Family: Arthroleptidae
- Genus: Astylosternus
- Species: A. fallax

Binomial name
- Astylosternus fallax Amiet, 1978

= Astylosternus fallax =

Species of amphibian

Astylosternus fallax, also known as the Fopouanga night frog, is a species of frog in the family Arthroleptidae. It is endemic to south-western Cameroon where it is known only from between Yabassi and Nkongsamba, from Mount Yuhan in the Korup National Park, and from Mount Nta Ali in the Mamfe basin.

== Description ==
Tadpoles are long and slender with a long, muscular tail. The body is oval. Tadpoles in Gosner stage 25 measure 45–74 mm (1.8–2.9 in) in total length.

== Habitat and conservation ==
Astylosternus fallax lives and breeds in and near rivers and slow-flowing streams in lowland and hilly closed-canopy forests, mostly below 1,000 m (3,300 ft). Males call from amidst dead leaves on the river banks near water. It is a common species, albeit known from only few locations. However, within its very small range it is severely threatened by habitat loss, which is primarily driven by human settlement and agricultural encroachment. Human consumption might also be a threat. This species is present in the Korup National Park.
