= Crystal Mountains (Africa) =

Mountain range in Africa

Coordinates: 0.805°N 10.16°E

Naming
- Native name: Monts de Cristal (French)

Geography
- Location: Equatorial Guinea, Gabon, Republic of the Congo, Democratic Republic of the Congo, Angola

Crystal Mountains (Monts de Cristal) is a group of low mountains (or hills, as all peaks are below 1,000 metres or 3,300 feet) inland of the Atlantic coast of Equatorial Guinea, Gabon, the Republic of the Congo, the Democratic Republic of the Congo, and Angola. It is the edge of the interior Woleu-Ntem Plateau against the coastal lowland which has a steep descent deeply cut by streams and waterfalls.

Part of the area is preserved in Gabon as the Crystal Mountains National Park. Mont Mbilan is the highest point (about 925 metres or 3,030 feet) in the park. Seni Mont (611 metres or 2,005 feet) receives the highest rainfall in all of Gabon (350 centimetres or 140 inches per year).

== Fauna ==
Two species of frogs, Leptopelis crystallinoron and Leptodactylodon stevarti, are only known from the Crystal Mountains.
