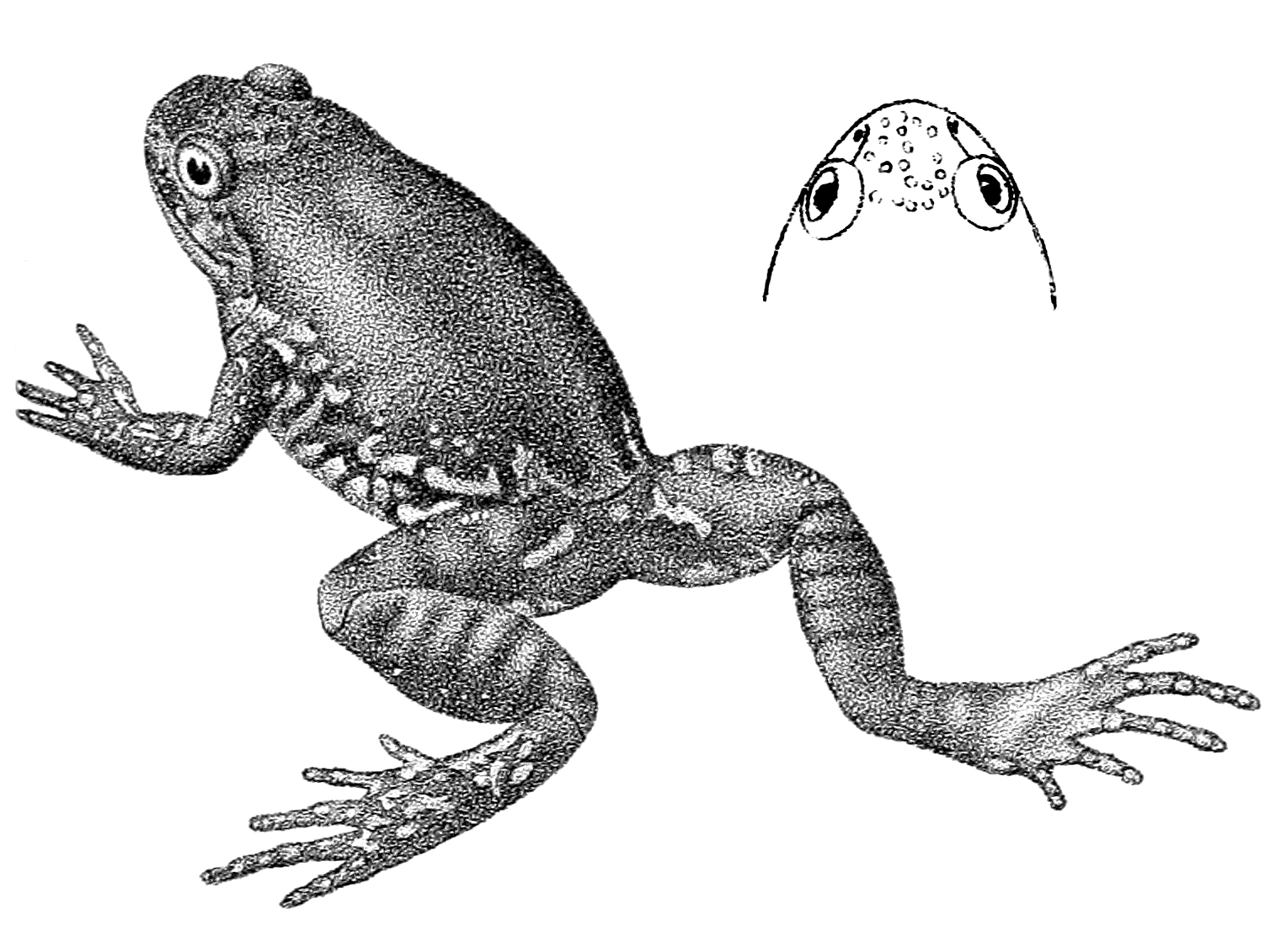

Conservation status
- Least Concern (IUCN 3.1)

Scientific classification
- Kingdom: Animalia
- Phylum: Chordata
- Class: Amphibia
- Order: Anura
- Family: Arthroleptidae
- Genus: Leptodactylodon
- Species: L. ovatus

Binomial name
- Leptodactylodon ovatus Andersson, 1903

= Leptodactylodon ovatus =

Species of amphibian

Leptodactylodon ovatus is a species of frog in the family Arthroleptidae. It is found in western Cameroon and extreme eastern Nigeria. Two subspecies are distinguished: Leptodactylodon ovatus ovatus in the westernmost part of the range and Leptodactylodon ovatus orientalis in the east, probably separated by Mount Kupe.

Its natural habitats are lowland forests with continuous canopy. Breeding takes place in streams and tiny watercourses with slow flow in the forest; the males call from holes and cracks in rocks. This common species is probably threatened by habitat loss.
