= Astylosternus laticephalus =

Conservation status
- Near Threatened (IUCN 3.1)

Scientific classification
- Kingdom: Animalia
- Phylum: Chordata
- Class: Amphibia
- Order: Anura
- Family: Arthroleptidae
- Genus: Astylosternus
- Species: A. laticephalus

Binomial name
- Astylosternus laticephalus Rödel, Hillers, Leaché, Kouamé, Ofori-Boateng, Diaz & Sandberger, 2012

Species of frog

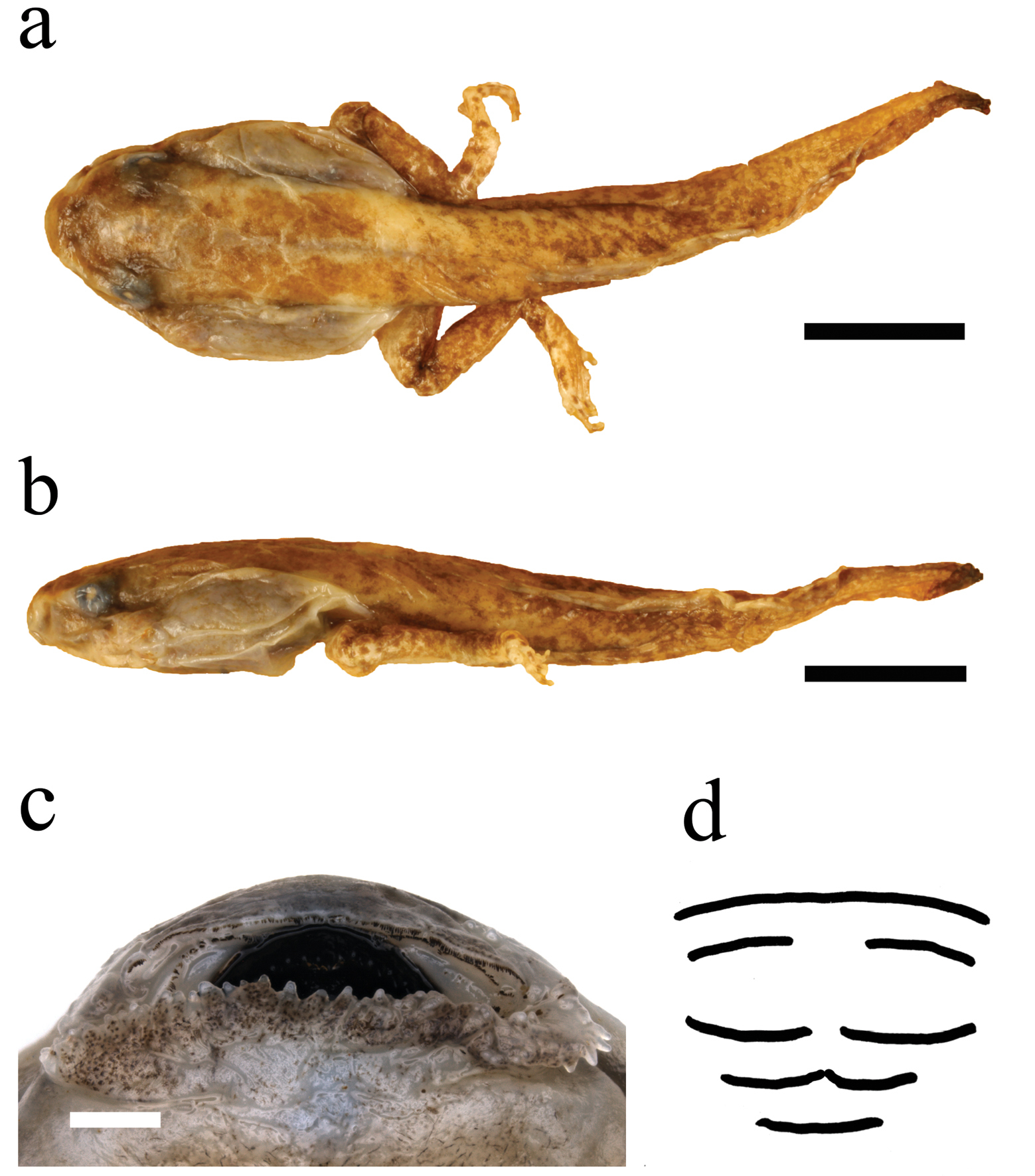

Astylosternus laticephalus is a species of frog native to Ghana and Ivory Coast. It lives in forests and wetlands in an elevation range of 35 to 170 m (115 to 558 ft). It's listed as a Near Threatened species by the IUCN Red List. It was scientifically described in 2012.

== Description ==
The species measure 48.7 to 53.8 mm (1.92 to 2.12 in) in males and 51.8 to 64.4 mm (2.04 to 2.54 in). There are no supernumerary tubercles and the palmar tubercles are big and oval shaped. The species is brown or red in color and it has red blotches on throughout its back. Little amounts of low webbing and somewhat dilated toe tips are present. A faint black line typically surrounds the supra-tympanal ridge.
