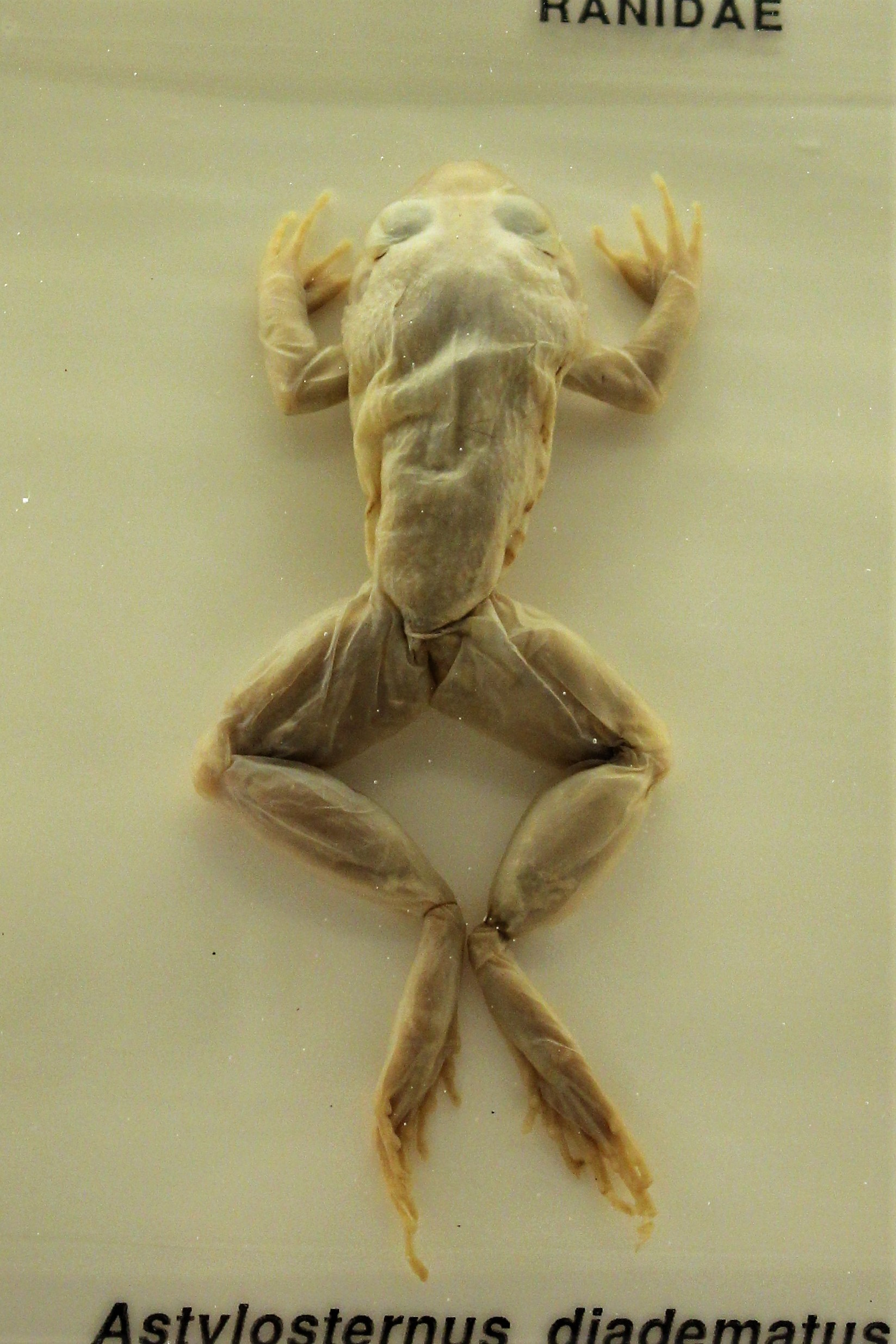

Conservation status
- Least Concern (IUCN 3.1)

Scientific classification
- Kingdom: Animalia
- Phylum: Chordata
- Class: Amphibia
- Order: Anura
- Family: Arthroleptidae
- Genus: Astylosternus
- Species: A. diadematus

Binomial name
- Astylosternus diadematus Werner, 1898

= Victoria night frog =

Species of amphibian

The Victoria night frog (Astylosternus diadematus) is a species of frog in the family Arthroleptidae. It is found in Cameroon and possibly Nigeria. Its natural habitats are subtropical or tropical moist lowland forests, subtropical or tropical moist montane forests, rivers, and heavily degraded former forest. It is threatened by habitat loss.
