= Leptodactylodon wildi =

Conservation status
- Critically Endangered (IUCN 3.1)

Scientific classification
- Kingdom: Animalia
- Phylum: Chordata
- Class: Amphibia
- Order: Anura
- Family: Arthroleptidae
- Genus: Leptodactylodon
- Species: L. wildi

Binomial name
- Leptodactylodon wildi Amiet & Dowsett-Lemaire, 2000

Species of amphibian

Leptodactylodon wildi, commonly called Wild's egg frog, is a species of frog in the family Arthroleptidae.

It is endemic to Cameroon. Its natural habitats are subtropical or tropical moist montane forests and freshwater springs. It is threatened by habitat loss.
