= Leptodactylodon stevarti =

Conservation status
- Endangered (IUCN 3.1)

Scientific classification
- Kingdom: Animalia
- Phylum: Chordata
- Class: Amphibia
- Order: Anura
- Family: Arthroleptidae
- Genus: Leptodactylodon
- Species: L. stevarti

Binomial name
- Leptodactylodon stevarti Rödel and Pauwels, 2003

Species of frog

Leptodactylodon stevarti is a species of frog in the family Arthroleptidae. It is known with certainty only from the area of its type locality, Monts de Cristal in northwestern Gabon. Only two specimens are known. However, there is an uncertain record from Equatorial Guinea that could represent this species or other, undescribed species. The specific name stevarti honours Tariq Stévart from the University of Brussels, an expert in western Central African orchids who help with the fieldwork. Common name Stévart's egg frog has been coined for the species.

== Description ==
Leptodactylodon stevarti was described based on two male specimens measuring 21–22 mm (0.83–0.87 in) in snout–vent length; the larger (holotype) was an adult whereas the smaller one (paratype) was a subadult or an adult not in breeding condition. Leptodactylodon stevarti is a stout frog with broad and comparatively flat head. The tympanum is small but distinct. The fingers have minute webbing whereas the toes have none. The dorsum is granular to warty. The dorsal colouration is chocolate brown to blackish brown spotted irregularly with small, white points. The belly and ventral parts of the thighs are white. The holotype has blackish brown throat with white spots, whereas the paratype has white throat densely beset with minute, black dots.

== Habitat and conservation ==
Leptodactylodon stevarti occurs in primary forest at elevations of 460–550 m (1,510–1,800 ft) above sea level. Specimens have been found under rocks along streams in deep, narrow valleys. Breeding takes place in fast-flowing, rocky streams. The paratype had eaten a large ant and a small ground beetle. The species is threatened by habitat loss caused by smallholder farming activities and logging. It occurs in Crystal Mountains National Park, but protection of forest in the national park is required.
