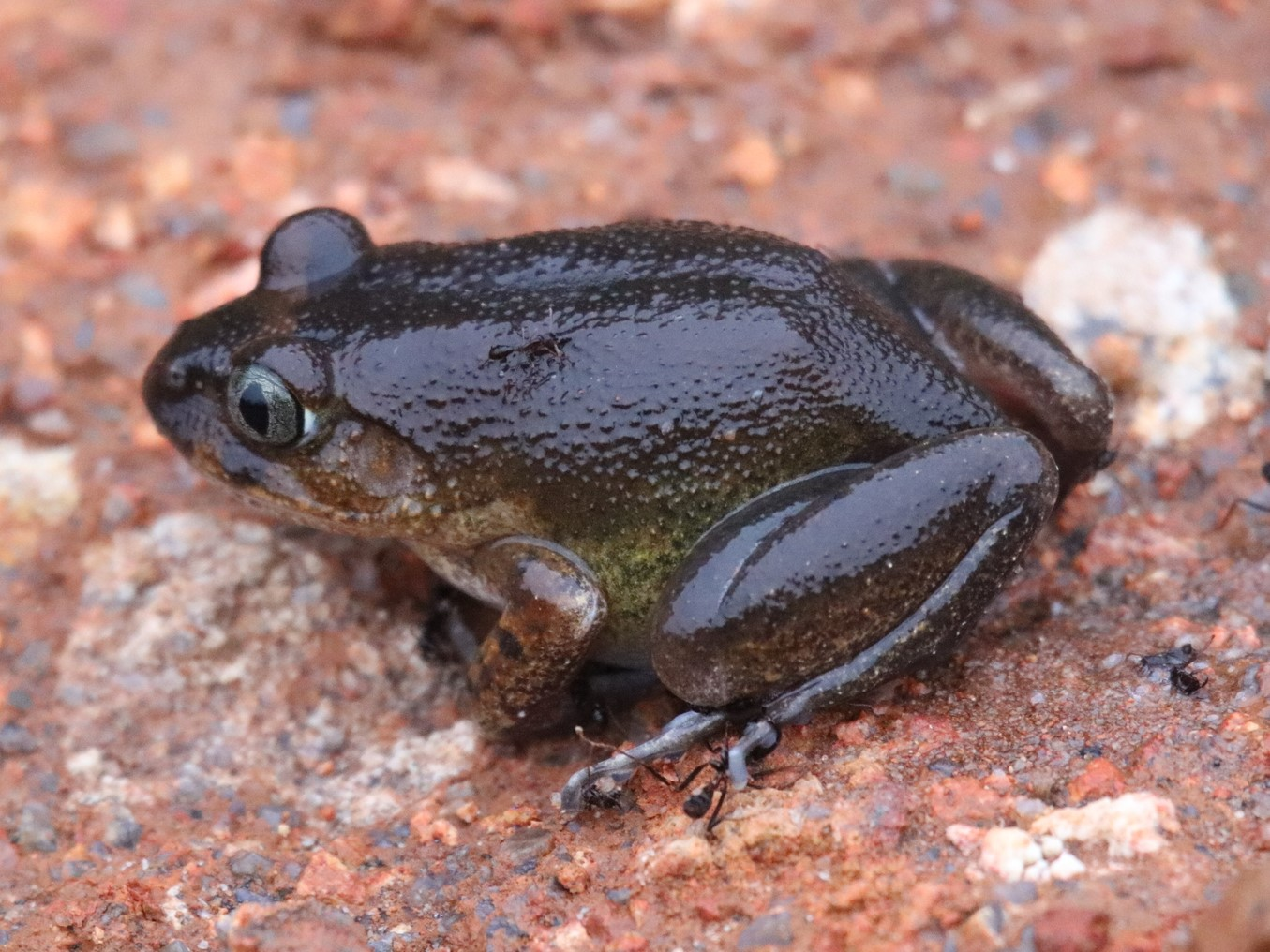

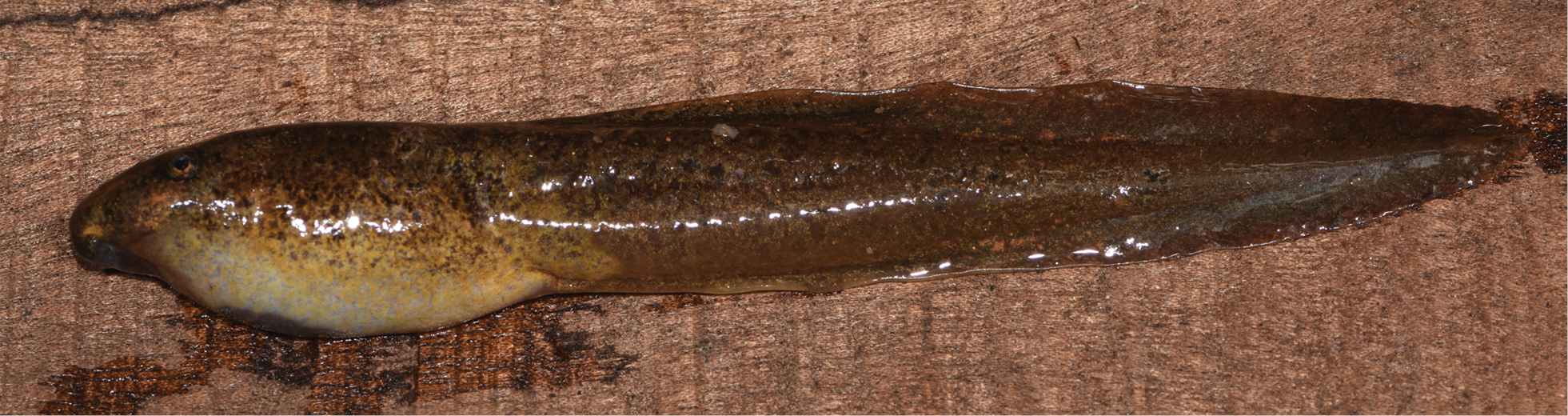
- Adult (top) and tadpole (bottom)

Conservation status
- Least Concern (IUCN 3.1)

Scientific classification
- Kingdom: Animalia
- Phylum: Chordata
- Class: Amphibia
- Order: Anura
- Family: Arthroleptidae
- Genus: Astylosternus
- Species: A. occidentalis

Binomial name
- Astylosternus occidentalis Parker, 1931

Synonyms
- Hylambates yalense Angel, 1944

= Astylosternus occidentalis =

Species of frog

Astylosternus occidentalis is a species of frog in the family Arthroleptidae. It is found in southern Guinea, Sierra Leone, Liberia, and western Ivory Coast from sea level to elevations of about 1,300 m (4,300 ft).

Its natural habitats are secondary and primary forests. It is a secretive species that breeds in shallow streams. Habitat loss (deforestation) is a threat to this species.
