= Werneria iboundji =

Conservation status
- Critically Endangered (IUCN 3.1)

Scientific classification
- Kingdom: Animalia
- Phylum: Chordata
- Class: Amphibia
- Order: Anura
- Family: Bufonidae
- Genus: Werneria
- Species: W. iboundji

Binomial name
- Werneria iboundji Rödel, Schmitz, Pauwels, and Böhme, 2004

Species of amphibian

Werneria iboundji is a species of toad in the family Bufonidae. It is endemic to Gabon and only known from its type locality, Mont Iboundji. Only two specimens are known, collected from among rocks at the edge of a plunge pool at the base of a large waterfall in lowland forest, at 560 m (1,840 ft) above sea level. It is threatened by logging, which would likely negatively affect the micro-climate—the species depends on high humidity.
