= Werneria preussi =

Conservation status
- Endangered (IUCN 3.1)

Scientific classification
- Kingdom: Animalia
- Phylum: Chordata
- Class: Amphibia
- Order: Anura
- Family: Bufonidae
- Genus: Werneria
- Species: W. preussi

Binomial name
- Werneria preussi (Matschie, 1893)

Synonyms
- Bufo preussi Matschie, 1893; Atelopus africanus Werner, 1898; Stenoglossa fulva Andersson, 1903

Species of amphibian

Werneria preussi is a species of toad in the family Bufonidae. It is found in southwestern Cameroon and—highly disjunctly and based on a more than 100 years old record—in Togo. Some sources also mention Equatorial Guinea.

Its natural habitats are rocky streams and waterfalls in submontane forests, but it also occurs in degraded secondary habitats. It lives exclusively in and around water and breeds in streams. It is locally common but probably threatened by loss of its forest caused by agricultural encroachment and human settlement.
