= Astylosternus nganhanus =

Conservation status
- Critically Endangered (IUCN 3.1)

Scientific classification
- Kingdom: Animalia
- Phylum: Chordata
- Class: Amphibia
- Order: Anura
- Family: Arthroleptidae
- Genus: Astylosternus
- Species: A. nganhanus

Binomial name
- Astylosternus nganhanus Amiet, 1978

Species of frog

Astylosternus nganhanus is a species of frog in the family Arthroleptidae. It is endemic to Cameroon and known from Mount Nganha on the Adamawa Plateau; it is probably endemic to that area. Common name Nganha night frog has been coined for it. This poorly known species is only known from five specimens.

== Description ==
Adult measure about 45 mm (1.8 in) in snout–vent length. The head is very narrow, triangular, and flattened in shape. The eyes are rather small and do not protrude greatly. The fingers are fairly short and slender. The hind-limbs are relatively short, and the toe tips are not dilates into discs. Skin is smooth, apart for some longitudinal fine wrinkles, in particular on the flanks. The colouration is dark with black patterning. The top of arms and fore-arms have large, raised black bumps. The thighs have only few markings. Dark pigmentation is also present under the throat and along the ventral surfaces.

== Habitat and conservation ==
Astylosternus nganhanus occurs along watercourses in a few narrow gallery forests, and in seepage areas in the nearby grassland, at elevations of 1,400–1,700 m (4,600–5,600 ft) above sea level. Tadpoles probably belonging to this species have been found in rock pools in streams.

This species, known from only a single population, is probably at severe risk from habitat loss caused by smallholder farming activities and subsistence wood extraction. It is not known to occur in any protected areas.
