= Leptodactylodon mertensi =

Conservation status
- Endangered (IUCN 3.1)

Scientific classification
- Kingdom: Animalia
- Phylum: Chordata
- Class: Amphibia
- Order: Anura
- Family: Arthroleptidae
- Genus: Leptodactylodon
- Species: L. mertensi

Binomial name
- Leptodactylodon mertensi Perret, 1959

Species of frog

Leptodactylodon mertensi is a species of frog in the family Arthroleptidae. It is endemic to the mountains of western Cameroon and occurs on the southern slopes of the Bamileke Plateau, Mount Nlonako, and Mount Manengouba. The specific name mertensi honours Robert Mertens, a German zoologist and herpetologist. Common name Mertens' egg frog has been coined for it.

Leptodactylodon mertensi occurs in montane and lower montane forest at elevations of 950–1,850 m (3,120–6,070 ft) above sea level. It lives in dense undergrowth and in dense herbage of raffia palm beds along streams. Males call near pools and riffles in small streams, or in waterlogged humus near springs. It is typically not found in rocky areas. Breeding takes place in small streams.

It is threatened by habitat loss caused by agricultural encroachment, agrochemicals, expanding human settlements, wood extraction, and unsustainable harvest of bark from Prunus africana. It is not known to occur in any protected areas.
