= Leptodactylodon boulengeri =

Conservation status
- Near Threatened (IUCN 3.1)

Scientific classification
- Kingdom: Animalia
- Phylum: Chordata
- Class: Amphibia
- Order: Anura
- Family: Arthroleptidae
- Genus: Leptodactylodon
- Species: L. boulengeri

Binomial name
- Leptodactylodon boulengeri Nieden, 1910

Synonyms
- Leptodactylodon bamilekianus Amiet, 1971

Species of amphibian

Leptodactylodon boulengeri is a species of frog in the family Arthroleptidae. It is found in the mountains of western Cameroon and the adjacent southern Nigeria, where it has recently been recorded in the Cross River State. The specific name boulengeri honours George Albert Boulenger, the famed Belgian-British herpetologist. Common name Boulenger's egg frog has been coined for this species.

Leptodactylodon boulengeri occurs in secondary forests and forest edges, dense bush, and raffia palm margins along swamps bordering rocky streams at elevations of 800–1,450 m (2,620–4,760 ft) above sea level. It can also inhabit degraded forests as long as some canopy cover is present. The tadpoles develop in streams. It is a common species that tolerates some habitat disturbance, but it is suspected to be declining because of habitat loss and degradation caused by smallholder farming activities and subsistence wood extraction. It might also suffer from the harvest of its tadpoles for human consumption. The role of chytridiomycosis is ambiguous. It is not known to occur in protected areas.
