= Astylosternus rheophilus =

Conservation status
- Near Threatened (IUCN 3.1)

Scientific classification
- Kingdom: Animalia
- Phylum: Chordata
- Class: Amphibia
- Order: Anura
- Family: Arthroleptidae
- Genus: Astylosternus
- Species: A. rheophilus

Binomial name
- Astylosternus rheophilus Amiet, 1978

Species of amphibian

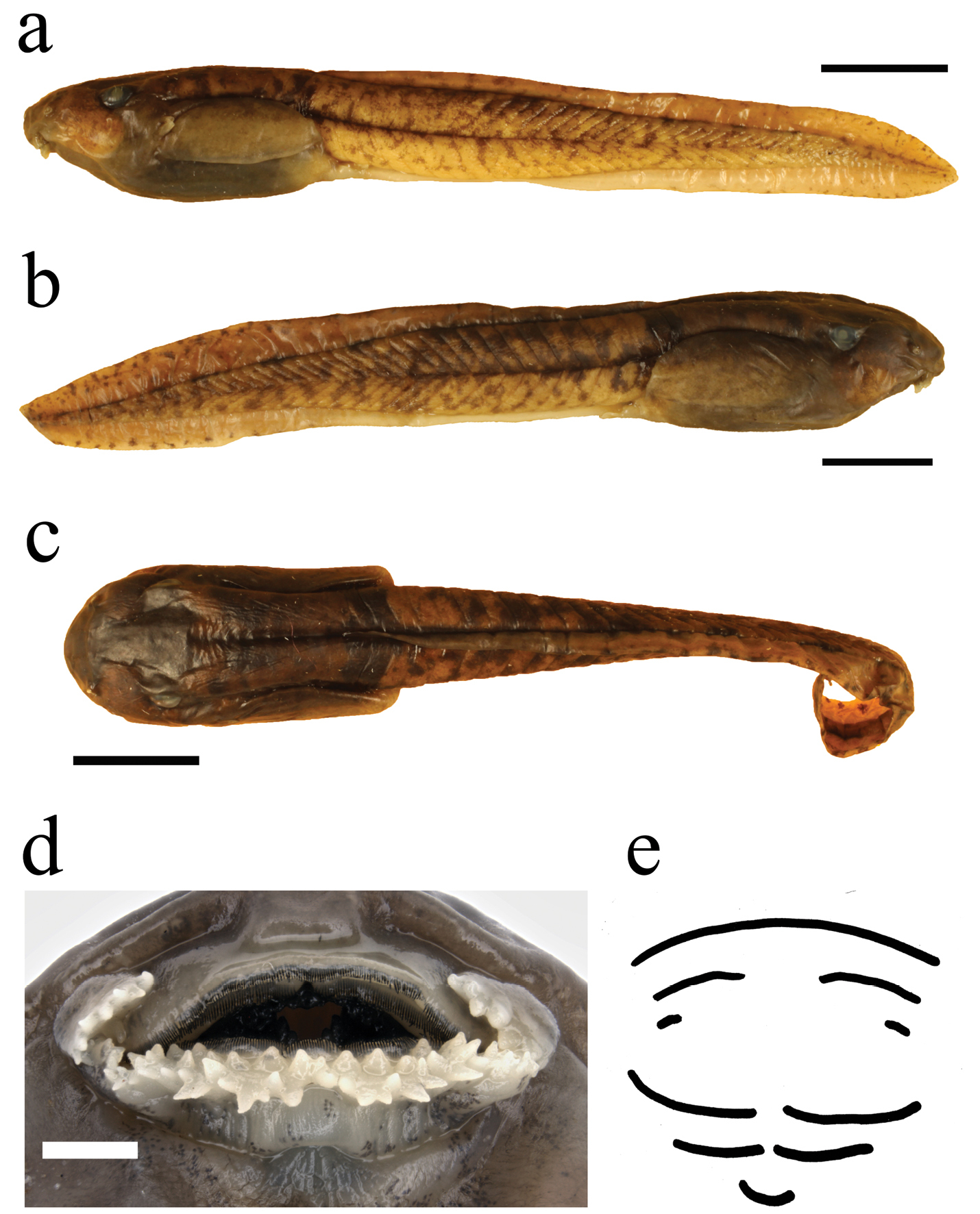

Astylosternus rheophilus is a species of frog in the family Arthroleptidae. It is endemic to western Cameroon. Common name Cameroon Range night frog has been coined for it. Two subspecies are recognized:

- Astylosternus rheophilus rheophilus Amiet, 1978 "1977"
- Astylosternus rheophilus tchabalensis Amiet, 1978 "1977"

== Habitats ==
Astylosternus rheophilus occurs in submontane and montane zones at elevations of 1,300–2,450 m (4,270–8,040 ft) above sea level. It is typically associated with small streams in forest, or at higher altitudes (>2000 m), also along streams in montane grassland, sometimes bordered with trees. Astylosternus rheophilus tchabalensis is known with certainty only from Tchabal Nganha and occurs in relict gallery forests in a generally deforested area. Breeding takes place in streams.

== Conservation status ==
Astylosternus rheophilus is a very common species. Although it tolerates some habitat modification, widespread habitat loss and degradation are threats to it. Chytridiomycosis might pose an additional threat, at least in situations where populations are already stressed. It occurs in the Bafut-Ngemba Forest Reserve.
