= Leptodactylodon polyacanthus =

Conservation status
- Vulnerable (IUCN 3.1)

Scientific classification
- Kingdom: Animalia
- Phylum: Chordata
- Class: Amphibia
- Order: Anura
- Family: Arthroleptidae
- Genus: Leptodactylodon
- Species: L. polyacanthus

Binomial name
- Leptodactylodon polyacanthus Amiet, 1971

Species of frog

Leptodactylodon polyacanthus is a species of frog in the family Arthroleptidae. It is found in the highlands of western Cameroon and on the Obudu Plateau in eastern Nigeria. Common name African egg frog has been coined for it.

== Subspecies ==
There are two subspecies:

- Leptodactylodon polyacanthus polyacanthus Amiet, 1971
- Leptodactylodon polyacanthus punctiventris Amiet, 1971

The nominotypical subspecies occurs in the northern parts of the species' range in both Cameroon and Nigeria. L. p. punctiventris is found in the southern part of the species' range in Cameroon only.

== Habitat and conservation ==
Leptodactylodon polyacanthus occurs in montane and submontane forests at elevations of 1,000–1,900 m (3,300–6,200 ft) above sea level; there is a tentative record from 1,997 m (6,552 ft). It can occur in degraded forests, provided that some canopy cover remains. Breeding takes place in streams and springs, and during the breeding season males can be found on wet clay, in rock crevices, and small streams, whereas the females hide under stones. Tadpoles have been found in shallow, sandy streams.

This species is threatened loss of its forest habitat caused by smallholder farming activities, expanding human settlements, and subsistence wood extraction. Collection for human consumption might affect some populations. The threat posed by chytridiomycosis remains uncertain. It occurs in the Bafut-Ngemba Forest Reserve.
