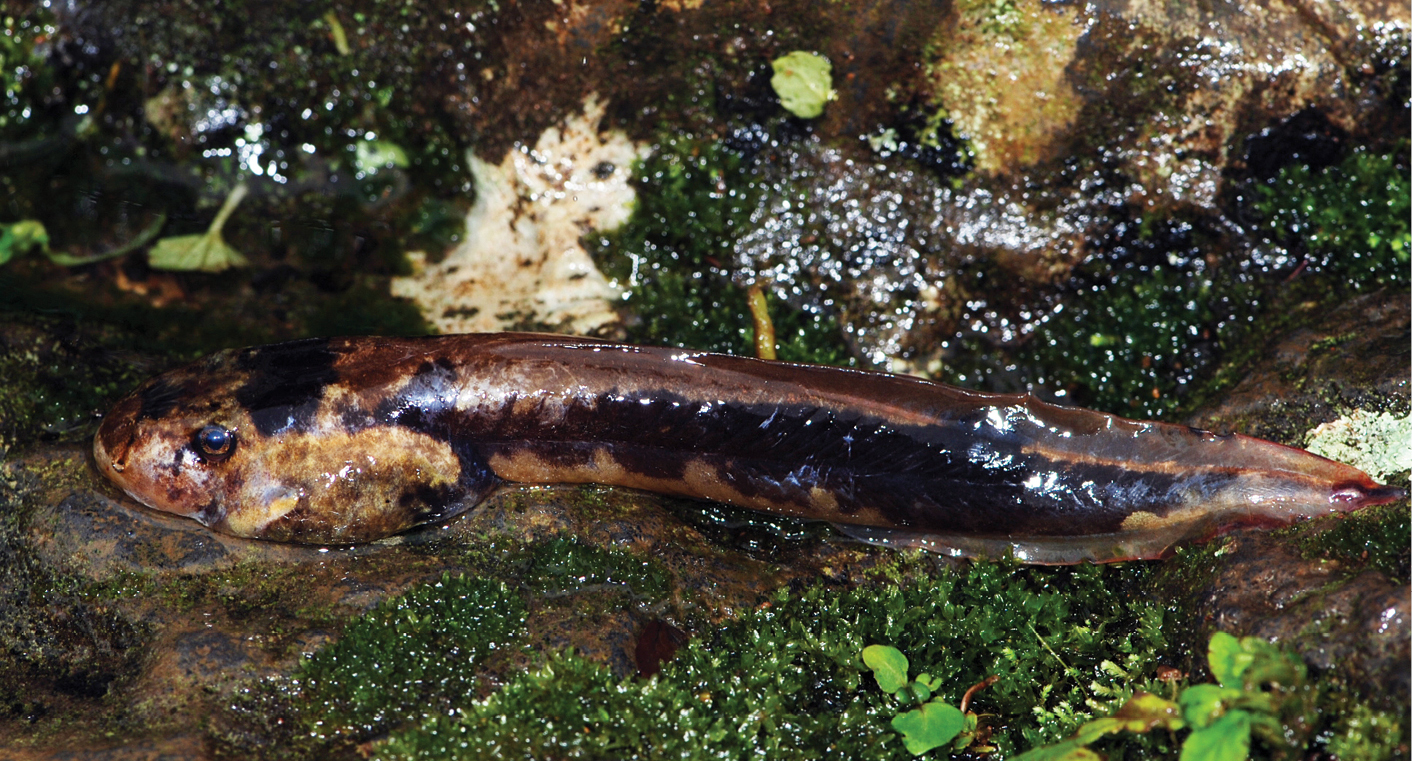
- Tadpole

Conservation status
- Endangered (IUCN 3.1)

Scientific classification
- Kingdom: Animalia
- Phylum: Chordata
- Class: Amphibia
- Order: Anura
- Family: Arthroleptidae
- Genus: Astylosternus
- Species: A. perreti

Binomial name
- Astylosternus perreti Amiet, 1978

= Astylosternus perreti =

Species of frog

Astylosternus perreti, also known as Perret's night frog, is a species of frog in the family Arthroleptidae. It is endemic to western Cameroon and known from Mount Manengouba and from parts of the Bamileke Highlands, at elevations of 1,200–1,400 m (3,900–4,600 ft) above sea level. It is one of the few species of African frogs to have claws, used on demand, when it feels threatened.

== Etymology ==
The specific name perreti honours Jean-Luc Perret, a Swiss herpetologist who has specialized in African amphibians.

== Habitat and conservation ==
Its natural habitats are lower montane and submontane forests, often in very steep terrain close to torrents. It lives in or near flowing water. It is threatened by severe habitat loss.
