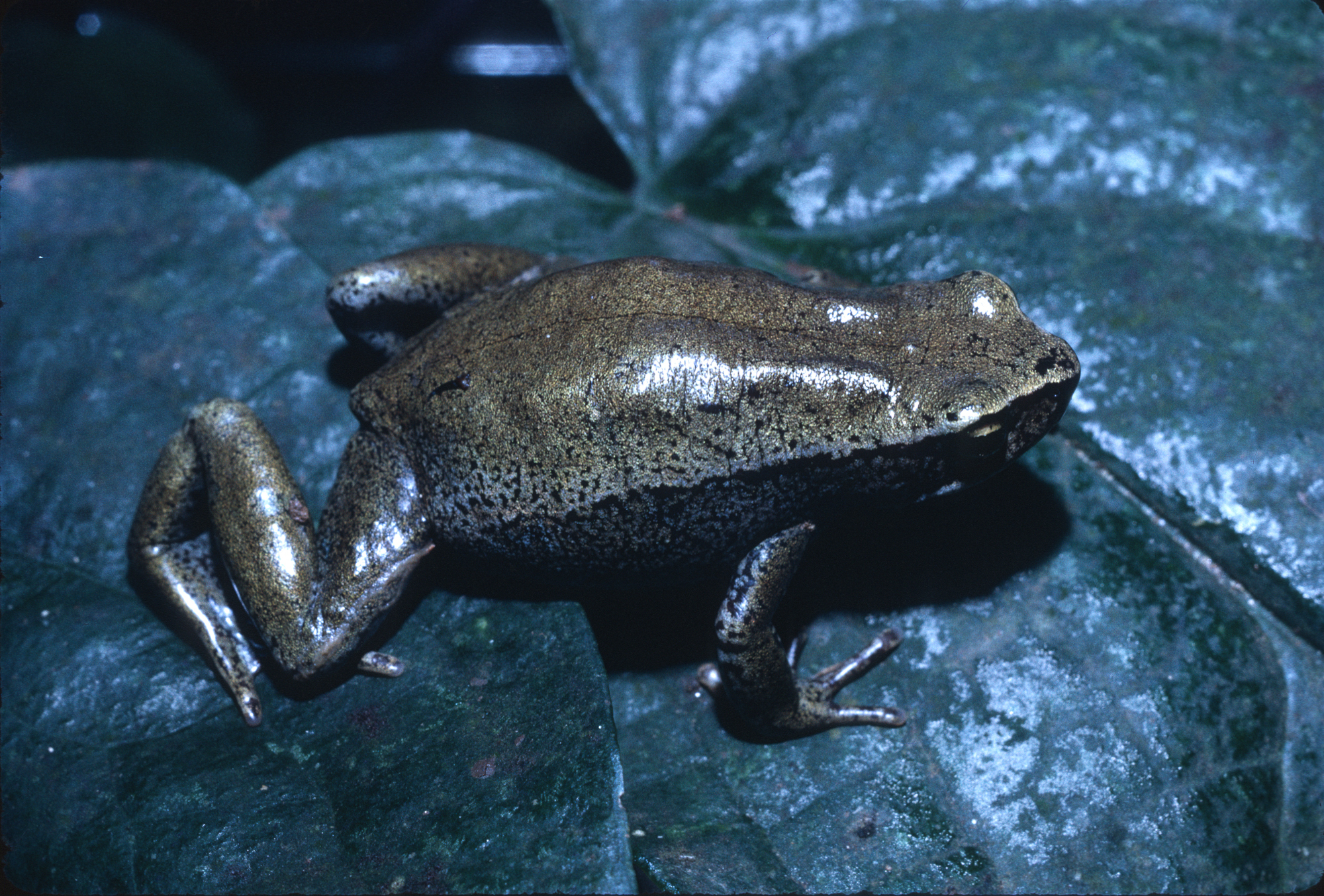

Conservation status
- Critically Endangered (IUCN 3.1)

Scientific classification
- Kingdom: Animalia
- Phylum: Chordata
- Class: Amphibia
- Order: Anura
- Family: Bufonidae
- Genus: Werneria
- Species: W. bambutensis

Binomial name
- Werneria bambutensis (Amiet, 1972)

Synonyms
- Bufo bambutensis Amiet, 1972

= Werneria bambutensis =

Species of amphibian

Werneria bambutensis is a species of toad in the family Bufonidae. It is endemic to western Cameroon where it occurs at high altitudes between Mount Manengouba and Mount Oku, including the eponymous Bamboutos Mountains. It is also known as the Bamboutos smalltongue toad and Bambouto torrent toad.

== Description ==
Adult males can grow to 33 mm (1.3 in) and adult females to 38 mm (1.5 in) in snout–vent length. The body is compact and the legs are short and thick. The snout is short and rounded. No tympanum is visible. The toes are fully webbed. The dorsum and the flanks are dark greenish-olive to clear bronze, with a gold shimmer or blackish speckles. The dorsolateral line (present in most other Werneria) is only weakly present on the sides of the head. The lower parts are uniformly grey to white with grey spots.

== Habitat and conservation ==
Werneria bambutensis lives in fast-flowing streams at elevations between 1,750 and 2,600 m (5,740 and 8,530 ft) above sea level, typically within montane forest patches and rarely lower than 2,100 m (6,900 ft). Outside the breeding season, it also seems to disperse away from streams into forest patches, open bamboo glades, and montane grassland. During the dry season, adults may hide under stones in streams. It is a rare species that appears to have declined at many known localities, possibly because of chytridiomycosis. It is further threatened by habitat loss (i.e., deforestation). It is not known from protected areas, although it might be present in the Bafut-Ngemba Forest Reserve.
