= Leptodactylodon bicolor =

Conservation status
- Near Threatened (IUCN 3.1)

Scientific classification
- Kingdom: Animalia
- Phylum: Chordata
- Class: Amphibia
- Order: Anura
- Family: Arthroleptidae
- Genus: Leptodactylodon
- Species: L. bicolor

Binomial name
- Leptodactylodon bicolor Amiet, 1971

Species of amphibian

Leptodactylodon bicolor is a species of frog in the family Arthroleptidae. It is found in Cameroon and Nigeria. Its natural habitats are subtropical or tropical moist montane forests, rivers, intermittent rivers, rocky areas, and heavily degraded former forest. It is threatened by habitat loss.
