= Leptodactylodon erythrogaster =

Conservation status
- Critically Endangered (IUCN 3.1)

Scientific classification
- Kingdom: Animalia
- Phylum: Chordata
- Class: Amphibia
- Order: Anura
- Family: Arthroleptidae
- Genus: Leptodactylodon
- Species: L. erythrogaster

Binomial name
- Leptodactylodon erythrogaster Amiet, 1971

Species of frog

Leptodactylodon erythrogaster is a species of frog in the family Arthroleptidae. It is endemic to Cameroon. Its natural habitats are subtropical or tropical moist montane forests, rivers, and freshwater springs. It is threatened by habitat loss.
