= Leptodactylodon albiventris =

Conservation status
- Endangered (IUCN 3.1)

Scientific classification
- Kingdom: Animalia
- Phylum: Chordata
- Class: Amphibia
- Order: Anura
- Family: Arthroleptidae
- Genus: Leptodactylodon
- Species: L. albiventris

Binomial name
- Leptodactylodon albiventris (Boulenger, 1905)

Species of amphibian

Leptodactylodon albiventris is a species of frog in the family Arthroleptidae.

It is endemic to Cameroon. Its natural habitats are subtropical or tropical moist lowland forests, subtropical or tropical moist montane forests, rivers, and rocky areas. It is threatened by habitat loss.
