= Leptodactylodon axillaris =

Conservation status
- Critically Endangered (IUCN 3.1)

Scientific classification
- Kingdom: Animalia
- Phylum: Chordata
- Class: Amphibia
- Order: Anura
- Family: Arthroleptidae
- Genus: Leptodactylodon
- Species: L. axillaris

Binomial name
- Leptodactylodon axillaris Amiet, 1971

Species of frog

Leptodactylodon axillaris is a species of frog in the family Arthroleptidae. It is endemic to Cameroon. Its natural habitats are subtropical or tropical moist montane forests, subtropical or tropical high-altitude grassland, rivers, freshwater springs, rocky areas, and heavily degraded former forest. It is only recorded to Mount Bamboutos, West Region, Cameroon and is threatened by habitat loss.

== Sources ==
- IUCN SSC Amphibian Specialist Group,. 2013. Leptodactylodon axillaris. The IUCN Red List of Threatened Species 2013: e.T54427A16924959. https://dx.doi.org/10.2305/IUCN.UK.2013-1.RLTS.T54427A16924959.en. Downloaded on 21 November 2016.
