= Werneria tandyi =

Conservation status
- Critically Endangered (IUCN 3.1)

Scientific classification
- Kingdom: Animalia
- Phylum: Chordata
- Class: Amphibia
- Order: Anura
- Family: Bufonidae
- Genus: Werneria
- Species: W. tandyi

Binomial name
- Werneria tandyi (Amiet, 1972)

Synonyms
- Bufo tandyi Amiet, 1972

Species of amphibian

Werneria tandyi, also known as Tandy's torrent toad or Tandy's smalltongue toad, is a species of toad in the family Bufonidae. It is endemic to western Cameroon and known from Mount Manengouba and from the Rumpi Hills. The specific name tandyi honours Robert Mills Tandy, biologist, herpetologist, and wildlife photographer.

== Description ==
Werneria tandyi is a relatively slender-bodied Werneria. Males grow to 35 mm (1.4 in) and females to 41 mm (1.6 in) in snout–vent length. The head is straight and pointed. Parotoid glands and tympani are absent. The toes have traces of webbing. The back is dark chocolate-brown, while the flanks are very dark brown to black and separated from the back by thin, white dorsolateral lines that are well-delineated. The venter is clear brown to yellowish gray with tiny white or yellow spots.

== Habitat and conservation ==
Werneria tandyi lives by fast-flowing streams in submontane forest and degraded secondary habitats at elevations of 1,000–1,750 m (3,280–5,740 ft) above sea level. Several individuals have been found clustered together on rocks in the splash zone of waterfalls during the breeding season. The tadpoles develop in the streams.

Previously, Werneria tandyi was common on Mount Manengouba, but it has not been observed there after 2010. The decline is similar to the ones caused by chytridiomycosis in other montane amphibians, though the cause remains unproven. Only one individual ever has been observed on the Rumpi Hills. The species is also likely to be threatened by habitat loss (loss of forests) caused by agriculture and human settlements. It might occur in the Rumpi Hills Wildlife Reserve.
