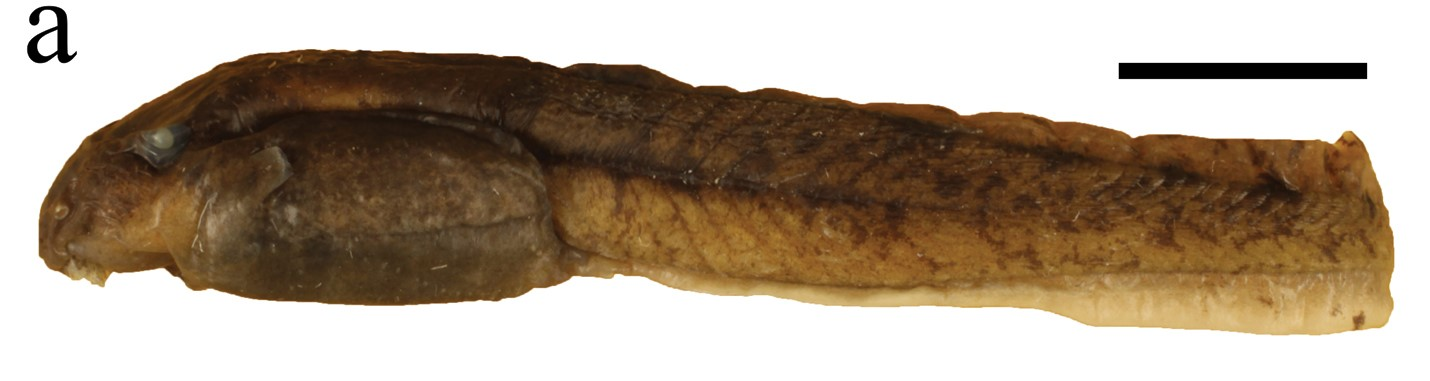
- Tadpole

Conservation status
- Least Concern (IUCN 3.1)

Scientific classification
- Kingdom: Animalia
- Phylum: Chordata
- Class: Amphibia
- Order: Anura
- Family: Arthroleptidae
- Genus: Astylosternus
- Species: A. montanus

Binomial name
- Astylosternus montanus Amiet, 1978

= Astylosternus montanus =

Species of amphibian

Astylosternus montanus, also known as the mountain night frog or montane night frog, is a species of frog in the family Arthroleptidae. It is found in the mountains of western Cameroon and into the Obudu Plateau in adjacent south-eastern Nigeria.

== Description ==
Astylosternus montanus has a short, stocky body. Males grow to 44 mm (1.7 in) and females to 52 mm (2.0 in) in snout–vent length. The head is slightly longer than it is wide. The legs are strong and relatively short. The dorsum is granular posteriorly and has few to many short dorsolateral ridges. The dorsum varies in colouration: beige, yellow, grey, or chocolate brown, and bears many distinctly delimited black blotches. The ventral parts are dull yellow with darker patterning. Males have a large black nuptial pad on the thumb and dense spines in the throat.

The male advertisement call is a brief and strong "dlouk", "hou", or "rrra".

== Habitat and conservation ==
Astylosternus montanus occurs in or near flowing water in lower montane and submontane forest or herbaceous vegetation and gallery forests at elevations of 900–2,029 m (2,953–6,657 ft) above sea level. It can roam to relatively dry areas along forest tracks and in agricultural areas during night. It can tolerate slightly deforestation but always requires canopy cover. It breeds in flowing water. The males call from rock cavities or from in the water.

Astylosternus montanus is a common species, but it probably suffers from some habitat loss and deterioration, despite showing a degree of adaptability. It may locally suffer from harvesting for consumption. It is not known to occur in any protected areas.
