= Crystal Mountains National Park =

National park of Gabon

- Parc National des Monts de Cristal
- IUCN category II (national park)
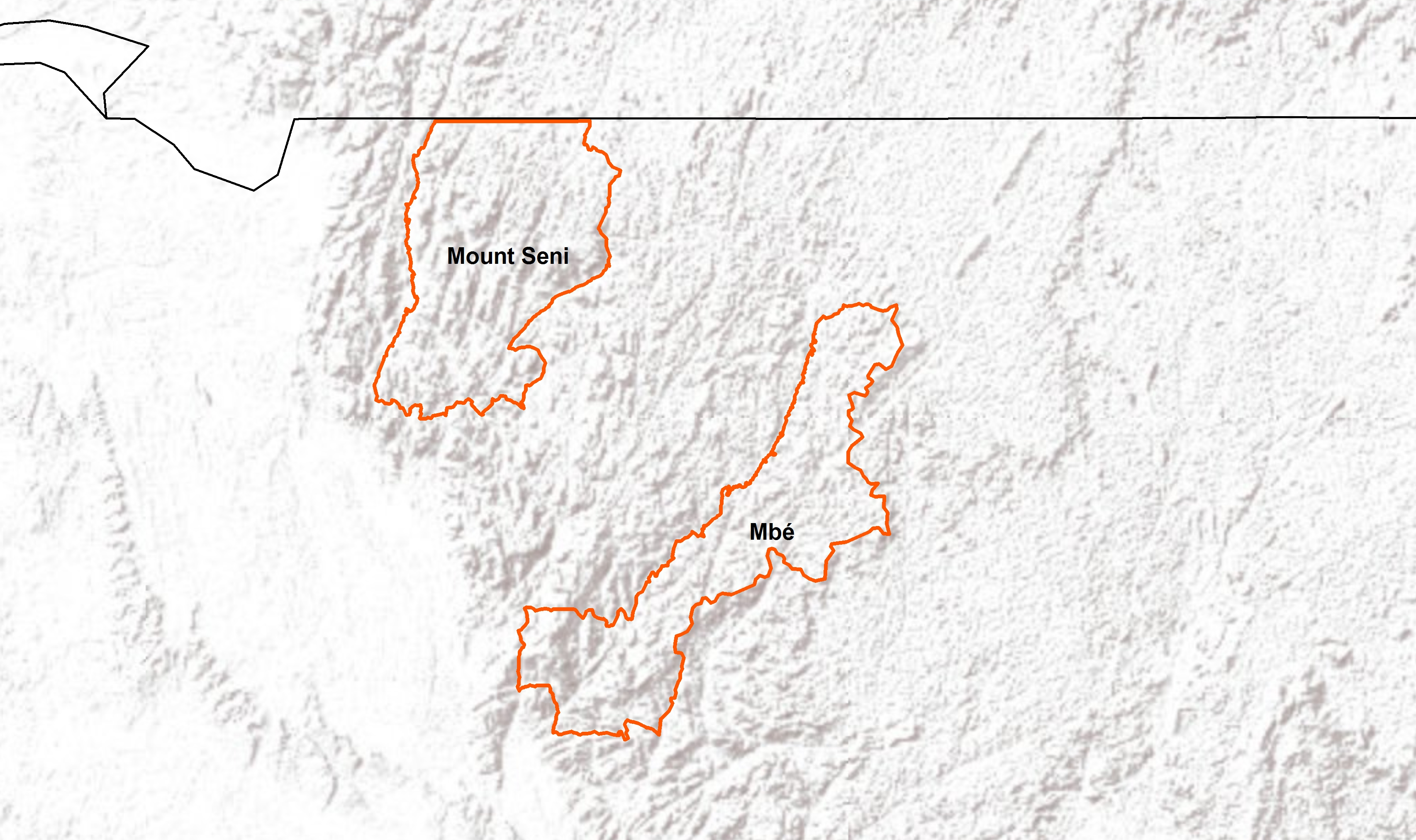
- Monts de Cristal twin national park
- Location: Gabon
- Coordinates: 0.805°N 10.16°E
- Area: 1,200 km^{2} (460 sq mi)
- Established: 2002
- Governing body: National Agency for National Parks

Crystal Mountains National Park (French: Parc National des Monts de Cristal) is a twin park and one of the 13 national parks of Gabon. It is situated in the Monts de Crystal on the western edge of the Woleu-Ntem Plateau, between Equatorial Guinea and the Ogooué River. The twin parks, Mbe National Park and Mt Sene National Park, were established on 4 September 2002, based on their exceptionally high plant biodiversity and forming part of a former Pleistocene rain forest refugium.

The park is home to many animal species such as elephants or monkeys, and hundreds of species of butterflies can be found here, some of which are very rare, such as euphaedra brevis, cymothoe or graphium angrier.
