= Leptodactylodon perreti =

Conservation status
- Endangered (IUCN 3.1)

Scientific classification
- Kingdom: Animalia
- Phylum: Chordata
- Class: Amphibia
- Order: Anura
- Family: Arthroleptidae
- Genus: Leptodactylodon
- Species: L. perreti

Binomial name
- Leptodactylodon perreti Amiet, 1971

Species of frog

Leptodactylodon perreti is a species of frog in the family Arthroleptidae. It is endemic to Cameroon and restricted to the central Cameroon Range. Common name Perret's egg frog has been coined for it.

== Etymology ==
The specific name perreti honours Jean-Luc Perret, a Swiss herpetologist who has specialized in African amphibians.

== Habitat and conservation ==
Its natural habitats are forests primarily in montane, and to a lesser extent submontane zone. It is threatened by habitat loss.
