= Cardioglossa venusta =

Conservation status
- Endangered (IUCN 3.1)

Scientific classification
- Kingdom: Animalia
- Phylum: Chordata
- Class: Amphibia
- Order: Anura
- Family: Arthroleptidae
- Genus: Cardioglossa
- Species: C. venusta

Binomial name
- Cardioglossa venusta Amiet, 1972

Species of frog

Cardioglossa venusta is a species of frog in the family Arthroleptidae. It is endemic to the mountains of western Cameroon. Specifically, it is known from Mount Manengouba, the Bamileke Highlands, Mount Nlonako, and the Rumpi Hills. Common name highland long-fingered frog has been coined for it.

== Description ==
Males measure 27–30 mm (1.1–1.2 in) in snout–vent length. Males have extremely long third fingers and spines in the fingers and in the groin; females lack these characteristics. Dorsal markings and the white line running under the tympanum, typical for the genus Cardioglossa, are absent.

== Habitat and conservation ==
Cardioglossa venusta occurs in montane forests and gallery forests near fast-flowing streams at elevations of 950–1,500 m (3,120–4,920 ft) above sea level. It can also persist in degraded, secondary habitat near more mature forest. Breeding takes place in streams.

Cardioglossa venusta is a poorly known species with highly fragmented population. It is threatened by further habitat loss caused by agricultural encroachment, expanding human settlements, and harvesting of wood for both firewood and building materials. It might occur in the Rumpi Hills Wildlife Reserve, but this would offer only limited protection.
