= Bisoro =

Village in Cameroon

Coordinates: 4°45′19″N 9°10′25″E

== Location ==
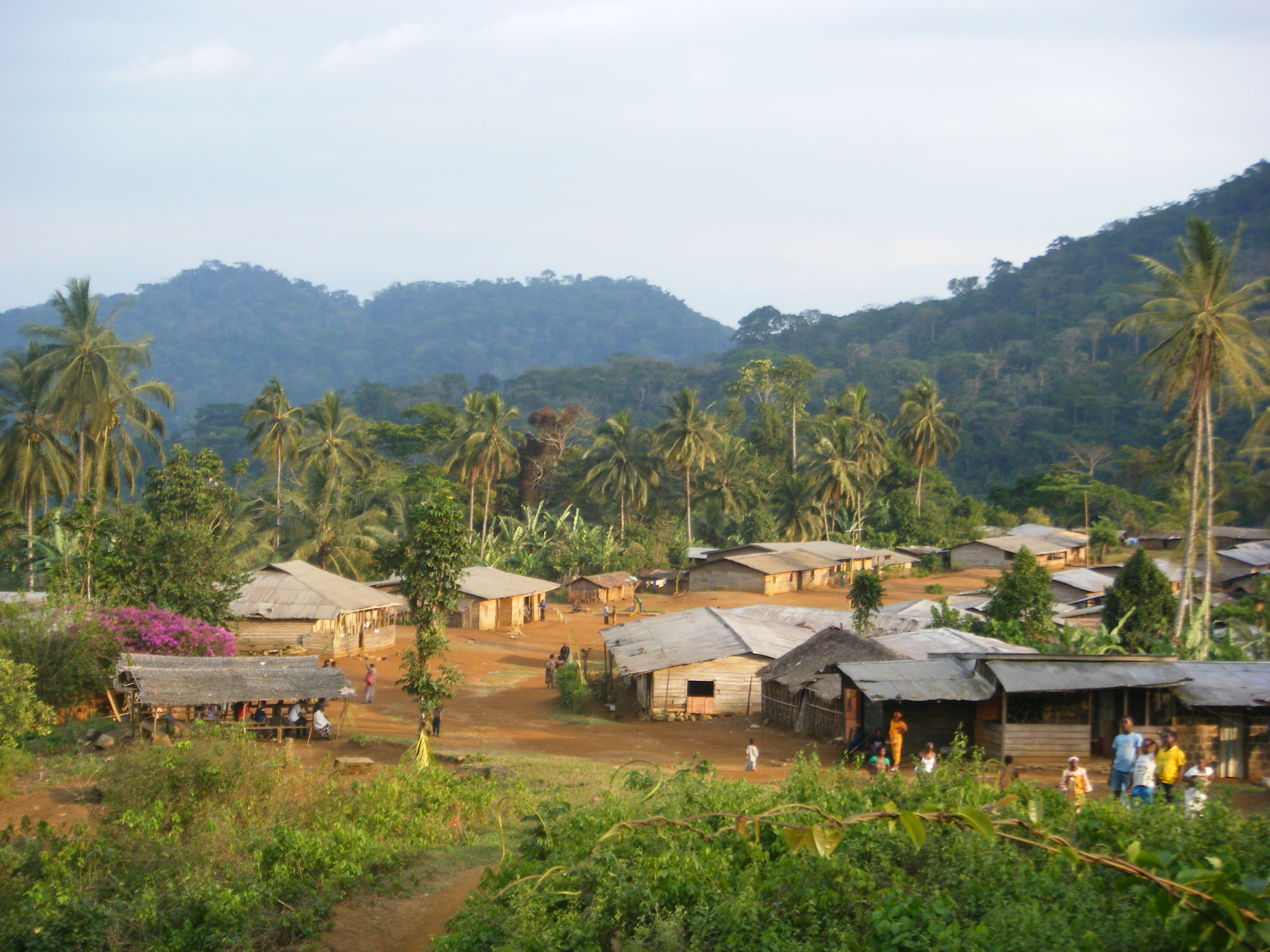
View of the village of Bisoro Balue

Bisoro is located in the Rumpi Hills of the Ekondo-Titi subdivision in the Ndian département of Cameroon's Southwest Region. It is situated 37 km southeast of the Bakassi Peninsula in the Gulf of Guinea. Bisoro Balue shares its boundaries with Pondo Balue to the south, Bafaka Balue to the west, Diboki Balue to the north and Weme Balue to the northeast.

== Village ==
Bisoro Balue is linked to the town of Kumba, the main economic town of the region, via road. With aid from the German Government, organized by the Partnership between the Church districts Schopfheim, Lörrach and Dikome-Balue Presbytery (PCC), the village has a 172.000 DM (52.000.000 CFA) 15000 L pipe-borne water system, a primary school that was established in 1958, a health centre established in 1982 and a secondary school established in September 2007.

The recent population census of 2005 estimates that the village has a population of about 5,000 people (Bucrep, 2005). The Government Secondary School (GSS) Bisoro Balue takes part in the scholarship fund of the Schopfheim-Lörrach-Dikome partnership.

Ekondo-Titi subdivision consists of thirty-four villages, and one urban center, which are all located in Ndian division in the South West province of Cameroon. This area was carved out from the Kumba division in 1966 by presidential decree No. 66/08/66. It is bounded by Mundemba to the north, to the west by the rural district of Kumbo Etindi, to the south by Bamusso subdivision, and to the east by Meme division (2012).

== See also ==
- Communes of Cameroon
