= Stephen Esoh Itoh =

Cameroonian traditional ruler

- Born: Stephen Esoh Itoh
- Died: August 12, 2018; Ekondo Titi, South-West Region, Cameroon
- Occupation: Traditional ruler
- Known for: Paramount Chief of Ekondo Titi; President of the South West Chiefs Conference
- Title: Paramount Chief of Ekondo Titi

Esoh Itoh (also referred to as Stephen Esoh Itoh; died 12 August 2018) was a Cameroonian traditional ruler who served as the paramount chief of Ekondo Titi in Ndian Division, South-West Region. He was a prominent figure among traditional authorities in the region and a former leader within regional chiefs' institutions. Esoh Itoh was assassinated during the Anglophone Crisis in Cameroon.

== Early life and background ==
Details about Esoh Itoh's early life, education, and date of birth are not widely documented for public sources. He originated from Ndian Division in the South-West Region of Cameroon, where he later rose to traditional leadership.

== Traditional leadership ==
Esoh Itoh served as the paramount chief of Ekondo Titi and was widely regarded as a senior traditional Chief among the Balondo people. He held leadership roles within traditional institutions, including serving as president of the South West Chiefs Conference.

He was also involved in socio-economic and development initiatives. Esoh Itoh served as a board chairman of PAMOL Plantations PLC, a major agro-industrial company in Cameroon's South-West Region.

In addition to his traditional duties, Esoh Itoh contributed to local development, including donating land for health infrastructure such as the Ekondo Titi Baptist Health Centre.

He was also politically affiliated with the ruling Cameroon People's Democratic Movement (CPDM).

Reports indicate that he had received threats but refused to abandon his position, insisting on fulfilling his responsibilities unless his community requested otherwise.

== Role in the Anglophone Crisis ==
In the course of the Anglophone Crisis, traditional rulers in Cameroon's North-West and South-West regions were often targeted by armed groups. Itoh was perceived by some separatist elements as aligned with the central government.

== Assassination ==
Esoh Itoh was assassinated on 12 August 2018 in Ekondo Titi. Armed men interrupted a Sunday service at a local Baptist church, forcibly removed him, and shot him dead.

The killing occurred in broad daylight and in the presence of worshippers. No group officially claimed responsibility, but local reports widely attributed the attack to separatist fighters in the region.

His assassination formed part of a broader pattern of violence against traditional rulers during the Anglophone Crisis, in which several chiefs were abducted or killed.

== Legacy ==
Esoh Itoh is remembered as one of several traditional leaders killed during the escalation of violence in Cameroon's Anglophone regions. His death highlighted the vulnerability of traditional institutions amid the conflict and drew attention to the role of chiefs as intermediaries between the state and local communities.
