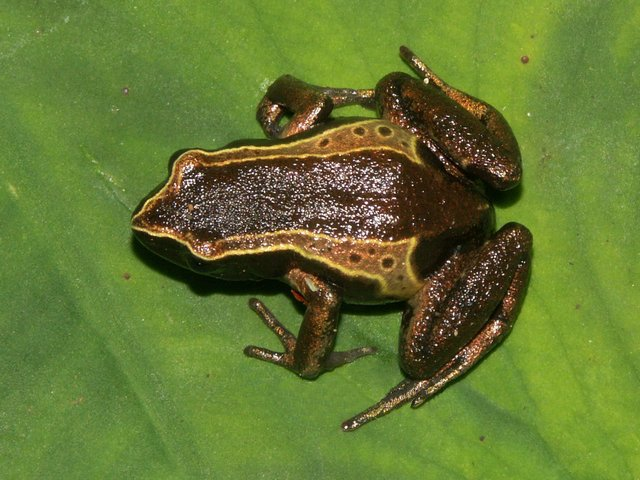

Conservation status
- Endangered (IUCN 3.1)

Scientific classification
- Kingdom: Animalia
- Phylum: Chordata
- Class: Amphibia
- Order: Anura
- Family: Arthroleptidae
- Genus: Cardioglossa
- Species: C. oreas

Binomial name
- Cardioglossa oreas Amiet, 1972

= Cardioglossa oreas =

Species of frog

Cardioglossa oreas (common name: Mount Okou long-fingered frog) is a species of frog in the family Arthroleptidae. It is endemic to Cameroon and known from the Western High Plateau between Mount Oku and the Bamboutos Mountains. Records from Mount Manengouba refer to Cardioglossa manengouba.

== Description ==
Males measure 23–23 mm (0.9–0.9 in) and females 27–30 mm (1.1–1.2 in) in snout–vent length. Unusually for the genus Cardioglossa, the third finger in males is not elongated. It is nevertheless sexually dimorphic in that males have spines in the fingers whereas females do not. The tympanum is small and inconspicuous, another unusual character within Cardioglossa. Furthermore, the characteristic dorsal markings and the white line running under the tympanum are absent. Despite these unusual morphological characters, genetic data nest C. oreas well within the genus Cardioglossa.

== Habitat and conservation ==
Cardioglossa oreas occurs in montane forests, often in bamboo forests; it also occurs in degraded habitats containing trees. It is typically found in areas around fast-flowing streams, its breeding habitat. Its altitudinal range is 1,900–2,650 m (6,230–8,690 ft) above sea level.

Cardioglossa oreas is common within its small range, but the distribution of this species is severely fragmented and its forest habitat is declining. It occurs in the Bafut-Ngemba Forest Reserve.
