= Mbella Moki Charles =

- Born: Mbella Moki Charles
- Citizenship: Cameroon
- Occupations: Politician, Senator, former Mayor
- Known for: Senator for Fako Division; former Mayor of Buea; advocacy on infrastructure in South-West Cameroon
- Office: Senator, Fako Division, South-West Region, Cameroon
- Political party: Cameroon People’s Democratic Movement (CPDM)

Mbella Moki Charles is a Cameroonian politician and member of the Senate of Cameroon representing the Fako Division in the South-West Region. He previously served as Mayor of Buea, and is known for his outspoken positions on infrastructure, governance and development challenges in the region.

== Early life ==
A 2013 profile notes that he is originally from Likoko Membea village in Buea Subdivision, married and father of children.

== Career ==
=== Mayor of Buea ===
As Mayor of Buea, Mbella Moki oversaw municipal social-support programs, including scholarship awards for pupils, students and persons with disabilities. One documented program granted financial support to 377 beneficiaries in a single year.

He also held leadership positions in regional football administration, serving as President of the South-West Regional League of the Cameroon Football Federation (FECAFOOT) beginning in April 2009.

He remained mayor until 2013, when his successor was installed following his election to the Senate.

=== Senator (2013–present) ===
Mbella Moki became a Senator during Cameroon's first senatorial elections in 2013. His mandate was renewed in 2023.

== Political positions ==
=== Advocacy on infrastructure and road networks ===
He is widely known for criticizing neglected road projects in the South-West Region. In December 2024, he publicly condemned administrative delays hindering the Bikoko–Idenau road project, calling the situation a “mafia” and warning that deteriorating infrastructure fuels insecurity and separatist sentiment.

He also highlighted the dire condition of routes linking Buea, Ndian, and Ekondo Titi to the rest of Cameroon.

=== Peace efforts in Anglophone regions ===
During the anglophone crisis escalation in late 2017, he joined a delegation of anglophone “elites” visiting schools and communities across the South-West Region to encourage calm and national unity.

=== Governance and corruption criticism ===
In 2017, Mbella Moki publicly criticized rising corruption in Fako politics, denouncing what he termed “ill-gotten wealth” and rivalries among political actors.

He has also spoken out against “certificate fraud” among local officials, describing it as a threat to public integrity.

== Sports involvement ==
Aside from politics, he has been active in football governance as President of the South-West Regional FECAFOOT league.

He has also participated in academic governance as a board member of a higher-education institution in Buea.

== Controversies ==
His vocal style has drawn both support and criticism. Some commentators argue that his statements do not always translate into legislative outcomes.
