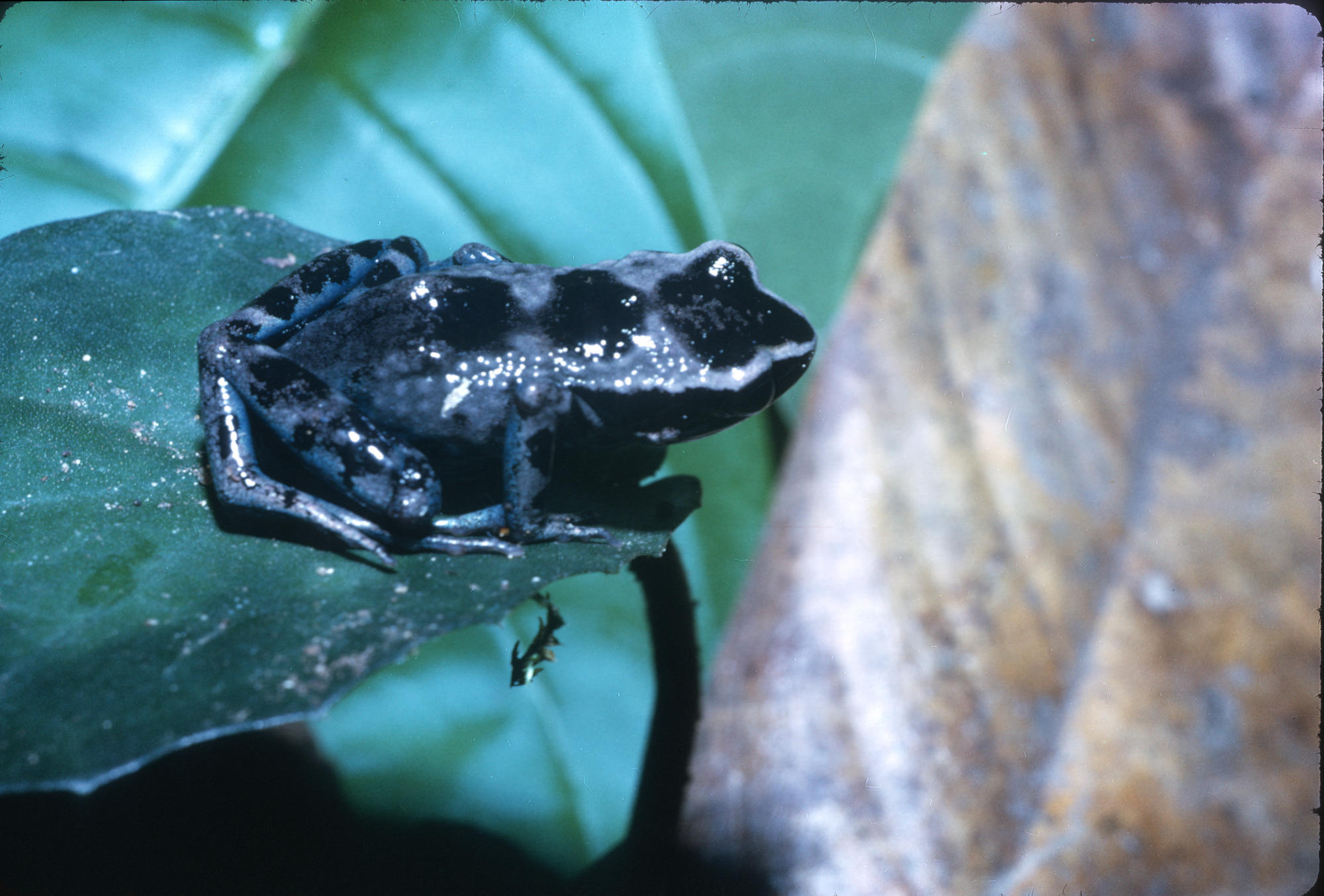

Conservation status
- Critically Endangered (IUCN 3.1)

Scientific classification
- Kingdom: Animalia
- Phylum: Chordata
- Class: Amphibia
- Order: Anura
- Family: Arthroleptidae
- Genus: Cardioglossa
- Species: C. trifasciata

Binomial name
- Cardioglossa trifasciata Amiet, 1972

= Cardioglossa trifasciata =

Species of frog

Cardioglossa trifasciata is a species of frog in the family Arthroleptidae. It is endemic to western Cameroon and only known from the southern slopes of Mount Manengouba. The common names Nsoung long-fingered frog and Banded long-fingered frog have been coined for it.

== Description ==
Males measure 24–31 mm (0.9–1.2 in) and females 30–41 mm (1.2–1.6 in) in snout–vent length. Males have extremely long third fingers and spines in the fingers and in the groin; females lack these characteristics. Dorsal markings typical for the genus Cardioglossa are present, whereas the white line running under the tympanum is absent.

Cardioglossa trifasciata is only known from Mount Manengouba, Cameroon

== Habitat and conservation ==
Cardioglossa trifasciata occurs in dense secondary bush and montane forest at elevations of 1,750–2,000 m (5,740–6,560 ft) above sea level; it has not been recorded from primary forest because no such habitat remains. Individuals have been found in and around a small stream, hiding under large rocks and small stones. Breeding probably takes place in the stream.

Cardioglossa trifasciata occurs in an area that is well surveyed. There is no good quantitative data on its abundance, but it is believed to be declining. The species is threatened by habitat loss caused by agricultural encroachment (including plantations of tree crops), expanding human settlements, and extraction of wood for firewood and building materials. It is not known from any protected area. Suitable habitat might exist on the Rumpi Hills, a site relatively close to Mount Manengouba. However, the area has not been well investigated in recent years, and it is not known whether the species might be found in the Rumpi Hills.
