= Cardioglossa melanogaster =

Conservation status
- Vulnerable (IUCN 3.1)

Scientific classification
- Kingdom: Animalia
- Phylum: Chordata
- Class: Amphibia
- Order: Anura
- Family: Arthroleptidae
- Genus: Cardioglossa
- Species: C. melanogaster

Binomial name
- Cardioglossa melanogaster Amiet, 1972

Species of frog

Cardioglossa melanogaster is a species of frog in the family Arthroleptidae. It is found in the mountains of western Cameroon (Mount Manengouba, southernmost Bamileke Plateau, Mount Nlonako, Bamenda Highlands, Rumpi Hills) and eastern Nigeria (Obudu Plateau). Common name Amiet's long-fingered frog has been coined for it.

== Description ==
Males measure 25–30 mm (1.0–1.2 in) and females 27–34 mm (1.1–1.3 in) in snout–vent length. Males have extremely long third fingers and spines in the fingers and in the groin; females lack these characteristics. The dorsum and flanks show distinctive tan and black patterning. The pupil is vertical and iris is gold. The white line running under the tympanum continues beyond the eye.

The tadpoles have a stream-adapted eel-like shape with long, muscular tails, narrow fins, and a long spiracle. The body is robust and elongated. The largest measured tadpole (Gosner stage 35) had a total length of 44 mm (1.7 in), most of which was tail (32 mm (1.3 in)).

== Habitat and conservation ==
Cardioglossa melanogaster occurs in montane forests, including areas with dense secondary growth. Its altitudinal range is 1,000–2,000 m (3,300–6,600 ft) above sea level. Breeding takes place in streams, along which the males call. Tadpoles have been found in streams with very slow current within forest fragments and in degraded areas with farms nearby. During the day, the tadpoles were hiding under stones or dead leaves in the riverbed.

Cardioglossa melanogaster is most abundant in the higher part of its altitudinal range. It is threatened by habitat loss caused by agricultural encroachment (including plantations of tree crops), expanding human settlements, and extraction of wood for firewood and building materials. It occurs in the Bafut-Ngemba Forest Reserve in Cameroon, although this reserve requires improved protection.
