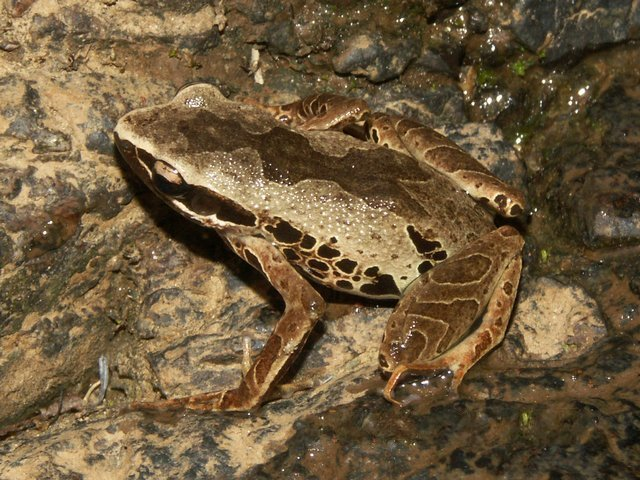

Conservation status
- Least Concern (IUCN 3.1)

Scientific classification
- Kingdom: Animalia
- Phylum: Chordata
- Class: Amphibia
- Order: Anura
- Family: Arthroleptidae
- Genus: Cardioglossa
- Species: C. leucomystax

Binomial name
- Cardioglossa leucomystax (Boulenger, 1903)

Synonyms
- Arthroleptis leucomystax Boulenger, 1903

= Cardioglossa leucomystax =

Species of frog

Cardioglossa leucomystax is a species of frog in the family Arthroleptidae. It is found in large parts of Central Africa (Cameroon, southeastern Central African Republic, Equatorial Guinea, Gabon, the Republic of the Congo, and northeastern Democratic Republic of the Congo), extending into south-easternmost West Africa (Nigeria). The type locality is Cap Saint Jean in Equatorial Guinea. Populations from the Upper Guinean Forests of West Africa between Ghana and Sierra Leone previously allocated to this species were in 2008 described as a new species, Cardioglossa occidentalis. Common name silver long-fingered frog has been coined for Cardioglossa leucomystax.

== Description ==
Adult males measure 25–30 mm (1.0–1.2 in) and adult females 27–39 mm (1.1–1.5 in) in snout–vent length. The tympanum is easily visible. Cardioglossa leucomystax resembles Cardioglossa occidentalis but most obviously differs from it by the white infratympanic line that extends to the nostril (terminating below the eye in C. occidentalis). The flanks are usually spotted, but in some populations the spots are almost absent, forming a nearly continuous line with the dark face mask. In juveniles, the spots may be entirely absent.

== Habitat and conservation ==
Cardioglossa leucomystax, defined as including Cardioglossa occidentalis, occur in lowland and lower montane forests, including secondary forests and heavily degraded habitats. They are usually found near stream margins with small stones and sand. Males call from among rocks in dense vegetation near the streams. Breeding takes place in streams during the dry season.

This species is very common in parts of its range, notably in Gabon. It is probably affected by habitat loss. It occurs in some protected areas, such as the Virunga National Park in the Democratic Republic of Congo and Korup National Park in Cameroon.
