= Rumpi Hills Wildlife Reserve =

Wildlife preserve in Cameroon

- IUCN category VI (protected area with sustainable use of natural resources)
- Location within Cameroon
- Coordinates: 4°51′26″N 9°07′15″E
- Area: 452 square kilometres (175 sq mi)
- Established: 1941

The Rumpi Hills Wildlife Reserve is a reserve in the Rumpi Hills in western Cameroon. This site is 452 square kilometres (175 sq mi) in area.

The reserve was originally created in 1941. The hills are late tertiary volcanic rocks. Fauna include elephants, chimpanzee, drill and Preuss's monkey.

== Location and habitation ==
The Rumpi Hills Forest Reserve (RHFR) is located at latitude 4°51′26″ N and longitude 9°07′15″ E in Ndian division, South West Region of Cameroon. Previously known as the Rumpi Hills Native Administration Forest Reserve, it was created by Forestry Ordinance No 38 of 1937 and approved by Forestry Ordinance No 16756/79 of 2 July 1941.

The Northern boundary is the road from Lipenja Mukete through Ikoi and Dikome Ngolo to Madie. The Southern boundary goes through Nalende, Monyange, Itoki and Ilor to Moko. Meanwhile, the Eastern boundary goes through Dikome Balue, Mofako, Itende to Bisoro. Finally, the West boundary goes through Dibonda and Ndian and Ituka to Lipenja which is also the starting point of the reserve. These boundaries give the Rumpi Hills Forest Reserve a horse-shoe shape.

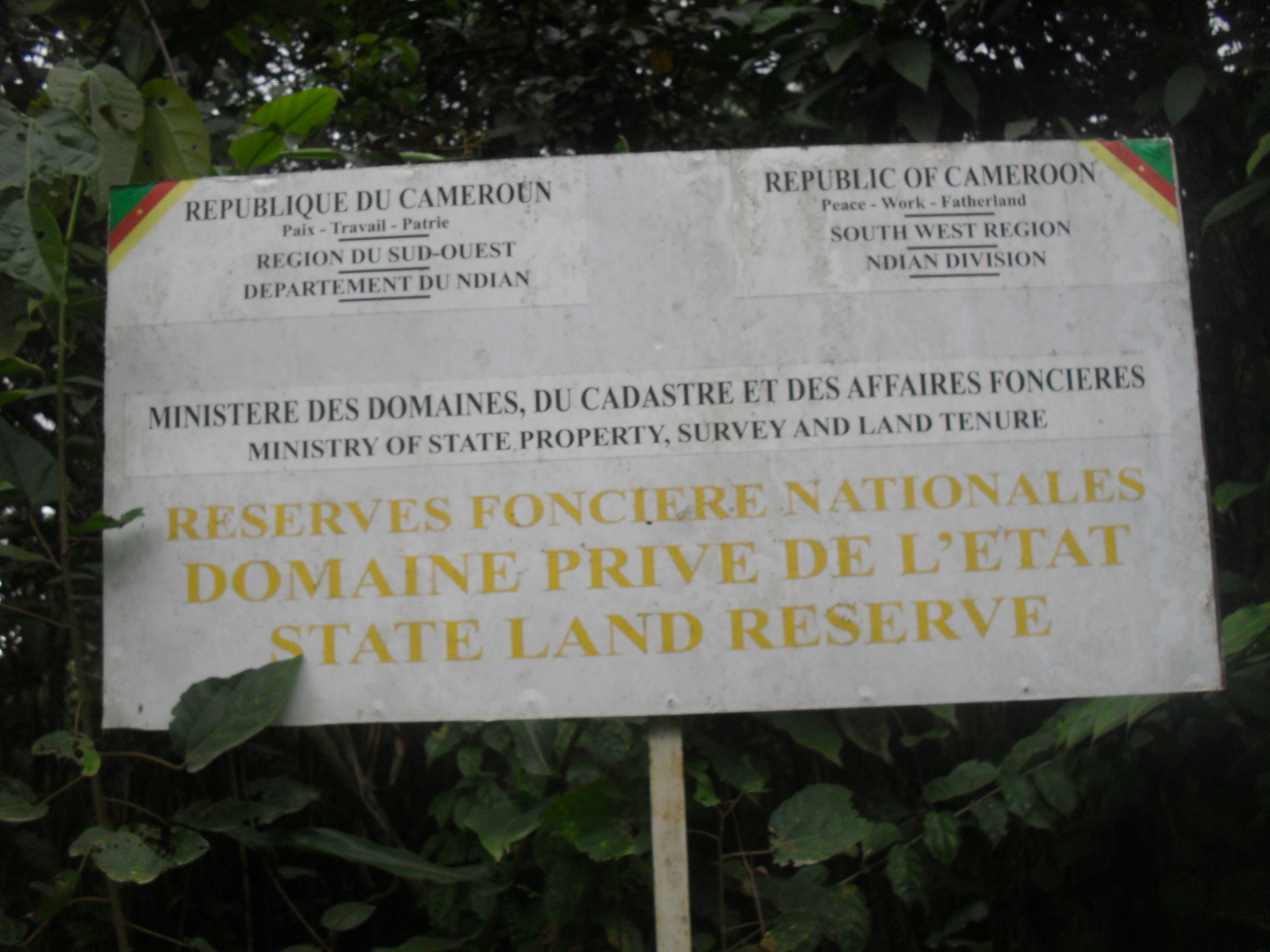

The reserve is composed of land belonging to the Ngolo, Bima and Balue tribes, the first two form part of the North West while the latter, forms part of the South East area. Most of the villages are on top of the hills, so that, a more or less vertical climb of anything up to 400 meters has to be faced before reaching a village or settlement.

== History ==
The proposal that part of the Rumpi hills forests should be made a forest reserve was first made by Mr Donovan Rosevear in a memorandum written in 1933 on the potential forest reserves of the Kumba Division, Cameroon. The actual preliminary survey of the area was done by Mr F.S. Collier in 1937 who after a tour round the approximate boundaries, suggested that about 640 km^{2} could be reserved. This figure was found to be too high owing to the presence in the middle of the reserve of many hitherto unknown villages. The area of the reserve was reduced to over 290 km^{2} in 1941 and later expanded to 455 km^{2} in 1961.

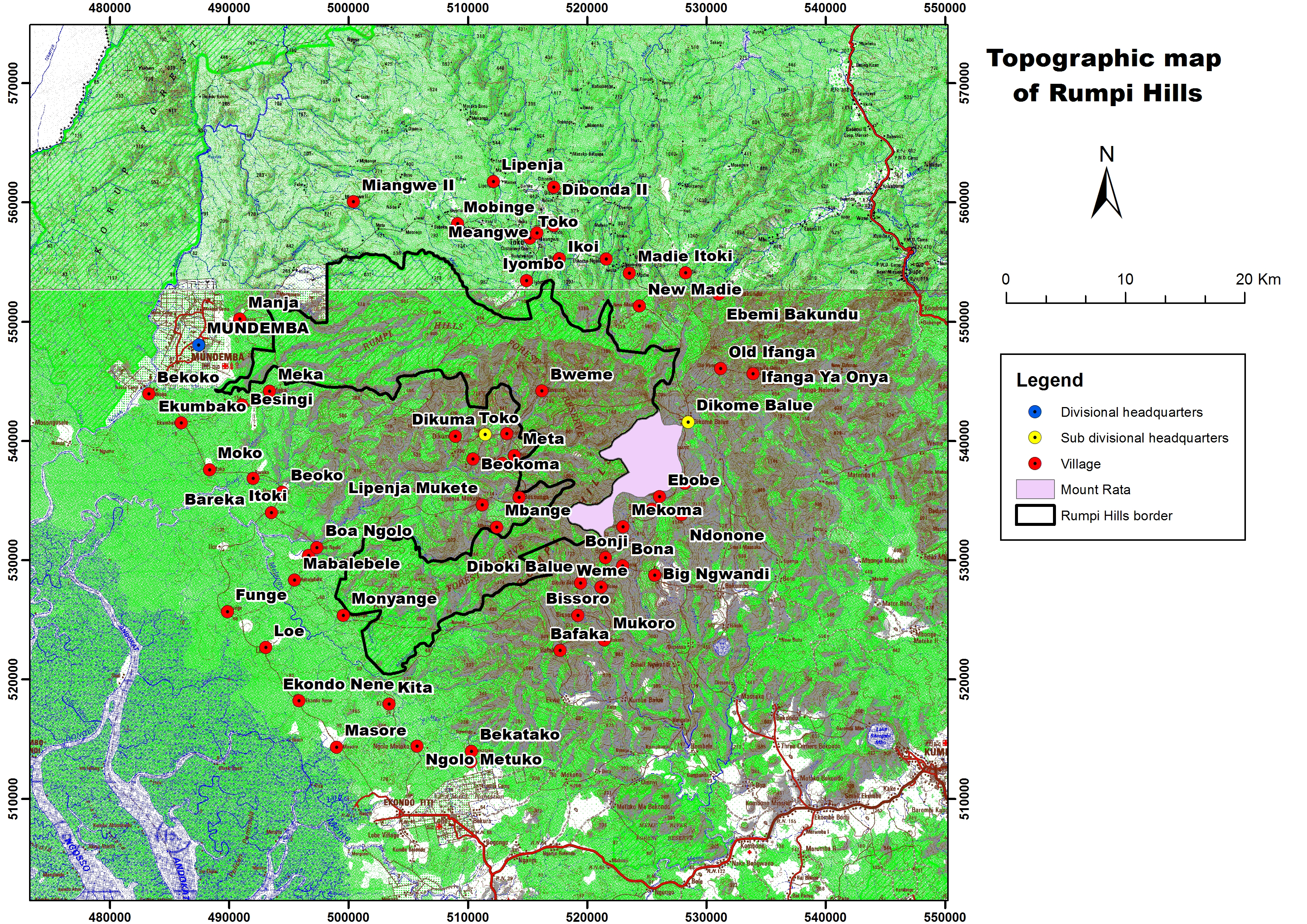

This forest reserve encompasses some 52 villages and 19 farm settlements, where these settlements emanated at various times from their parent villages in northern Ngolo. These did not appear as separate villages in the tax registers since their inhabitants paid their taxes to their parent villages. All these offshoots (new settlements) came from villages of Ngolo situated north of the reserve, in an area which was very thickly populated and therefore very heavily farmed. The local inhabitants did not reside in their farms but only visited them from their villages which therefore excluded their rights to reside within the created reserve. All farm settlements i.e. farms in which houses were erected were excluded from the reserve. Though, the boundaries have been fixed clear of those villages in order to allow as much land and room for expansion as is necessary, these village boundaries were not clearly defined. This is because, no information was provided outside the reserve on the area to be available for farming. Therefore, there is insufficient knowledge on how much farming land was made available, hence, difficulties are arising as the village populations continue to grow and as more land for farming is cleared.

According to Section 23 of the Forestry Ordinance and in accordance with Section 22 of the said Ordinance, all that piece of land, the situation and limits of which were set forth as demarcated by Mr F.S Collier in 1937, only one enclave existed within the forest zone (Bweme Ngolo). The rest, part of their forests and lands were cut as the reserve was traced. Recently, many villages have crossed into the forest land though they were allowed to hunt and fish with respect to the Wildlife Animals Preservation Ordinance, CAP. 99.

Additionally, the villagers had the right to collect food material and other minor non-timber forest products used in the villages which were not to be sold or bartered outside. The villagers also had rights to collect building poles and materials and fuel from Pycnanthus kombo (caraboard) and for all other trees except timber according to Forestry Ordinance No 38/37. All these were for strictly domestic use within the villages and not for sale or bartered outside. Villagers were also allowed to take cocoa from trees in farms existing at the time of the reserve officer’s judgment dated 20 April 1938 but not to extend such farms or to plant new trees. The villagers were also allowed the right to collect produce from existing farms within the reserve for a period of four years commencing from 1 April 1938.

== Economy ==
Given that majority of the population is rural with little opportunities for livelihood diversification, over 90% of the local population is engaged in agriculture. Cultivated food crops include cocoyams, plantains, yams, and cassava while cash crops are oil palm, rubber tree, and cocoa. The establishment of huge agro-industrial companies like Pamol Plantation Plc close to the southern border and SG Sustainable Oils Cameroon nearer the north border is a cause for concern.

Aside from agriculture, other livelihood activities in the RHFR include the harvesting of non-timber forest products (NTFPs), animal rearing and petit trading mostly as off-season jobs when pressure on crop cultivation is reduced. Others are employed as laborers in Pamol Plantations Plc, smallholder plantations and in small private businesses.

Meanwhile, in high altitude forest areas of Dikome Balue and Toko local councils, hunting and NTFPs gathering are important activities for the local communities. Gathered NTFPs include bush mango (Irvingia gabonsensis), bitter cola (Garcinia cola), njansang (Ricinodendron heudelotii), country onion (Afrostyrax lepidophyllus), bush pepper (Piper guineense), land snails (Archachatina marginata) and varieties of edible mushroom species.

== Geography ==
The soils are composed of Precambrian clays and sandstones which may have emanated from various volcanic eruptions. Located within the equatorial climatic zone, the area exhibits two seasons; the dry season from November to April and the rainy season from May to October with annual rainfall that ranges between 4027–6368 mm. Mean monthly maximum temperatures in the dry season are estimated at 31.8°C and 18.2°C during the rainy season. The relative humidity is high during most of the year with minimum monthly values ranging between 78% and 90%.

== Flora and fauna ==
Given that the RHFR varies in terms of heights above sea level with its highest point Rata Mountain tipping at 1800 m, there is some diversity in terms of vegetation. For example, along with an elevation gradient between 900–1800 m consists of an extension of sub-montane forests. In general, the forests are mixed but dominated by Caesalpinioid legumes. Trees may reach heights of 35 m with a canopy and foliage cover ranging from 60% to 90%. The canopy is usually full of climbers and the cloud forests appearance is as a result of the ever-present epiphytes. This diverse landscape of the RHFR supports habitats for a wide range of animals some of which are endemic. Over 198 bird species have been identified, including the endangered white-throated mountain-babbler (Kupeornis gilberti), whitenecked pigeon (Columba albinucha) and green-breasted bush-shrike (Malaconotus gladiator). Additionally, many tropical montane mammal, reptile and amphibian species such as the endangered Drill (Mandrillus leucophaeus), Forest shrew (Myosorex rumpii), Porcupine (Hystrix cristata) and Hairy frog (Trichobatrachus robustus) have been identified.

== Sources ==
- BirdLife International (2014). "Important bird areas factsheet: Mount Rata and Rumpi Hills Forest Reserve". Accessed 11 September 2016.
- Chuyong, G., Kenfack, D., Harms, K., Thomas, W., Condit, R and Comita, L (2011). Habitat specificity and diversity of tree species in an African wet tropical forest. Plant Ecology 212:1363–1374.
- Etongo, D and Glover, K (2012). Participatory resource mapping for livelihood values derived from the forest in Ekondo-Titi subregion, Cameroon: A gender analysis. International Journal of Forestry Research 2012:1-10.
- Kimengsi, J and Lambi, C (2015). Pamol Plantations Plc: prelude to a looming population problem in Ekondo-Titi sub-division, south west region of Cameroon. Journal of Sustainable Development in Africa 17(3):79-95.
- Lyonga, N (2012). Reducing tropical deforestation and degradation: an evaluation of subsistence agro-forestry systems around Korup National Park, Cameroon. MSc Thesis. University of Buea, Cameroon.
- Mukete, B., Sun, Y., Ayonghe, S., Ojong, L., Itoe, C and Tamungang, R. (2017a). Adaptation of women to climate variability in the southern slopes of the Rumpi hills of Cameroon. Agriculture, Forestry and Fisheries 5: 272-279.
- Beckline, Mukete; Yujun, Sun; Etongo, Daniel; Saeed, Sajjad; Mannan, Abdul (2018). "Assessing the drivers of land use change in the Rumpi hills forest protected area, Cameroon". Journal of Sustainable Forestry. 37 (6): 592–618. doi:10.1080/10549811.2018.1449121. S2CID 90942550.
- Mukete, B., Sun, Y., Etongo, D., Ekoungoulou, R., Folega, F., Sajjad, S., Ngoe, M and Ndiaye, G (2018c). Household characteristics and forest resources dependence in the Rumpi hills of Cameroon. Applied Ecology and Environmental Research 16(3):2755-2779.
- Mukete, B (2018). A Study on Land Use and Land Cover Changes in the Rumpi Hills Forests of Cameroon. Doctoral Dissertation, Department of Forest Management, Beijing Forestry University, China.
- SWPA (2016). Southwest Provincial Archives. The Rumpi Hills Native Administration Forest Reserve. Archives No Qh/c/1938/1, File No 16756 at Southwest Provincial Archives Buea, Cameroon.
- Yerima, K., & Van Ranst, E. (2005). Major soil classification systems used in the tropics: Soils of Cameroon (pp. 144). Canada: Trafford Publishing.
