= Cardioglossa congolia =

Conservation status
- Near Threatened (IUCN 3.1)

Scientific classification
- Kingdom: Animalia
- Phylum: Chordata
- Class: Amphibia
- Order: Anura
- Family: Arthroleptidae
- Genus: Cardioglossa
- Species: C. congolia

Binomial name
- Cardioglossa congolia Hirschfeld, Blackburn, Greenbaum & Rödel, 2015

Species of frog

Cardioglossa congolia, the Congolian long-fingered frog, is a species of frog native to the Democratic Republic of Congo and Congo that is a member of the Cardioglossa genus. It's found in elevations of 474 to 515 m (1,555 to 1,690 ft). Cardioglossa congolia is part of a subclade with five other species of the Cardioglossa genus, according to analysis of the mitochondrial 16S rRNA gene.

== Description ==
The specimens measured where only males that were around 23.1 to 27.2 m (76 to 89 ft) in length. It has a pointed snout and large tympanum with considerable prominence. The bases of the second digits' medial and lateral surfaces are likewise embellished with two or three tiny spines. The species is elongated and its body is slender. It's also grayish-brown in hue with dark blotches scattered across its body surface. Sexual dimorphism, if any, is unknown because no females have been gathered.
