= Cardioglossa gratiosa =

Conservation status
- Least Concern (IUCN 3.1)

Scientific classification
- Kingdom: Animalia
- Phylum: Chordata
- Class: Amphibia
- Order: Anura
- Family: Arthroleptidae
- Genus: Cardioglossa
- Species: C. gratiosa

Binomial name
- Cardioglossa gratiosa Amiet, 1972

Species of frog

Cardioglossa gratiosa is a species of frog in the family Arthroleptidae. It is found in Cameroon, Equatorial Guinea, Gabon, possibly Central African Republic, and possibly Republic of the Congo. Its natural habitats are subtropical or tropical moist lowland forests, rivers, swamps, and heavily degraded former forest. It is threatened by habitat loss.
