= Cardioglossa elegans =

Conservation status
- Least Concern (IUCN 3.1)

Scientific classification
- Kingdom: Animalia
- Phylum: Chordata
- Class: Amphibia
- Order: Anura
- Family: Arthroleptidae
- Genus: Cardioglossa
- Species: C. elegans

Binomial name
- Cardioglossa elegans Boulenger, 1906

Species of frog

Cardioglossa elegans is a species of frog in the family Arthroleptidae. It is found in southwestern Cameroon, Equatorial Guinea, and south to central Gabon. Common name elegant long-fingered frog has been coined for it.

== Description ==
Adult males measure 23–29 mm (0.9–1.1 in) and adult females 28–37 mm (1.1–1.5 in) in snout–vent length. Males have extremely long third fingers. The tympanum is visible. The dorsum is greyish brown and bears small and large symmetrical dark brown blotches with a pale outline. There are three large blotches; the first one is triangular and starts between the eyes, pointing backwards. Another two blotches follow immediately behind.

== Habitat and conservation ==
Cardioglossa elegans occur in moist lowland and degraded forests at elevations below 1,000 m (3,300 ft). Breeding takes place in small streams, and males call from rocky areas or from under bridges.

Cardioglossa elegans is a common species where it occurs, especially when aggregating for breeding. It can probably suffer locally from habitat loss. It is likely to occur in several protected areas.
