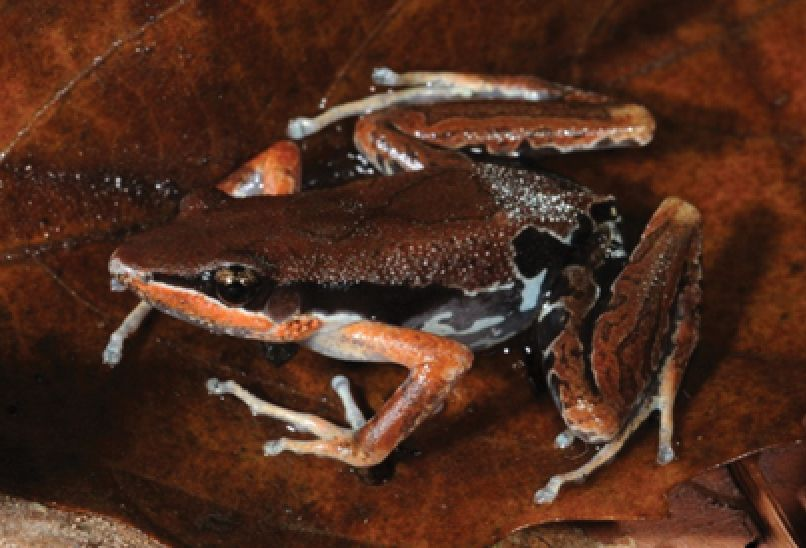
- male

Conservation status
- Least Concern (IUCN 3.1)

Scientific classification
- Kingdom: Animalia
- Phylum: Chordata
- Class: Amphibia
- Order: Anura
- Family: Arthroleptidae
- Genus: Cardioglossa
- Species: C. gracilis

Binomial name
- Cardioglossa gracilis Boulenger, 1900

= Cardioglossa gracilis =

Species of amphibian

Cardioglossa gracilis is a species of frog in the family Arthroleptidae. It is found in Cameroon, Central African Republic, Democratic Republic of the Congo, Equatorial Guinea, Gabon, Nigeria, and possibly Republic of the Congo. Its natural habitats are subtropical or tropical moist lowland forests, subtropical or tropical moist montane forests, and rivers. It is threatened by habitat loss.
