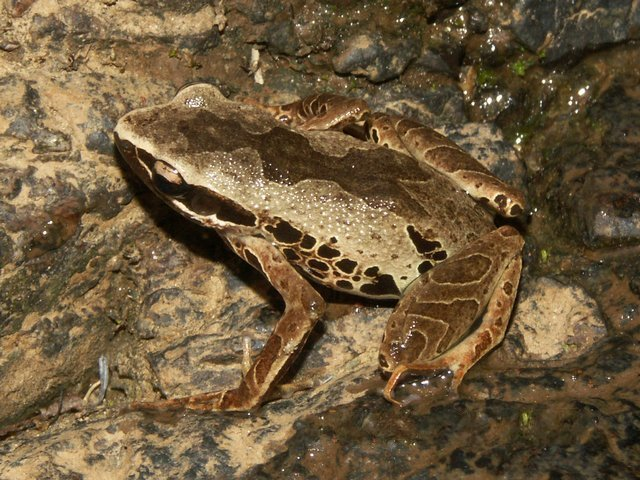
- Cardioglossa leucomystax

Scientific classification
- Domain: Eukaryota
- Kingdom: Animalia
- Phylum: Chordata
- Class: Amphibia
- Order: Anura
- Family: Arthroleptidae
- Subfamily: Arthroleptinae
- Genus: Cardioglossa; Boulenger, 1900

Type species
- Cardioglossa gracilis Boulenger, 1900

Diversity
- 19 species (see text)

= Cardioglossa =

Genus of amphibians

Cardioglossa is a genus of frogs in the family Arthroleptidae known as long-fingered frogs. They are native to western and central Africa, with the greatest species richness in Cameroon. They are found near streams in lowland and mountain forests, but also occur in other highland habitats near streams at up to 2,700 m (8,900 ft) in altitude. These are small frogs with a snout-to-vent length of 2 to 4 cm (0.8–1.6 in). Some of the more localized species are threatened.

== Species ==
There are 19 species of Cardioglossa:

- Cardioglossa alsco Herrmann, Herrmann, Schmitz & Böhme, 2004 — Alsco long-fingered frog
- Cardioglossa annulata Hirschfeld, Blackburn, Burger, Zassi-Boulou, and Rödel, 2015 — Annulated long-fingered frog
- Cardioglossa congolia Hirschfeld, Blackburn, Greenbaum, and Rödel, 2015 — Congolian long-fingered frog
- Cardioglossa cyaneospila Laurent, 1950 — Mukuzira long-fingered frog
- Cardioglossa elegans Boulenger, 1906 — Elegant long-fingered frog
- Cardioglossa escalerae Boulenger, 1903 — Equatorial Guinea long-fingered frog
- Cardioglossa gracilis Boulenger, 1900 — Rio Benito long-fingered frog
- Cardioglossa gratiosa Amiet, 1972 — Ongot long-fingered frog
- Cardioglossa inornata Laurent, 1952
- Cardioglossa leucomystax (Boulenger, 1903) — Silver long-fingered frog
- Cardioglossa melanogaster Amiet, 1972 — Amiet's long-fingered frog
- Cardioglossa manengouba Blackburn, 2008
- Cardioglossa nigromaculata, Nieden, 1908) — Blackspotted long-fingered frog
- Cardioglossa occidentalis Blackburn, Kosuch, Schmitz, Burger, Wagner, Gonwouo, Hillers, and Rödel, 2008 — Western long-fingered frog
- Cardioglossa oreas Amiet, 1972 — Mount Okou long-fingered frog
- Cardioglossa pulchra Schiøtz, 1963 — Black long-fingered frog
- Cardioglossa schioetzi Amiet, 1982 — Acha Tugi long-fingered frog
- Cardioglossa trifasciata Amiet, 1972 — Nsoung long-fingered frog
- Cardioglossa venusta Amiet, 1972 — Highland long-fingered frog
