= Cardioglossa nigromaculata =

Conservation status
- Least Concern (IUCN 3.1)

Scientific classification
- Kingdom: Animalia
- Phylum: Chordata
- Class: Amphibia
- Order: Anura
- Family: Arthroleptidae
- Genus: Cardioglossa
- Species: C. nigromaculata

Binomial name
- Cardioglossa nigromaculata Nieden, 1908

Synonyms
- Cardioglossa leucomystax var. nigromaculata Nieden, 1908

Species of amphibian

Cardioglossa nigromaculata is a species of frog in the family Arthroleptidae. It is found in the south-western Cameroon and in the extreme southern Nigeria at low altitudes. Common name blackspotted long-fingered frog has been coined for it.

== Description ==
Males measure 24–26 mm (0.9–1.0 in) and females, based on a single specimen, 32 mm (1.3 in) in snout–vent length. Males have extremely long third fingers and spines in the fingers and in the groin; females lack these characteristics. Dorsal markings, typical for the genus Cardioglossa, consist of an hour-glass pattern, with a separate blotch on the head. The white line running under the tympanum terminates under the eye.

== Habitat and conservation ==
Cardioglossa nigromaculata occurs in lowland moist forests, as well as in degraded habitats near more mature forests, at elevations of 100–300 m (330–980 ft) above sea level. Individuals can be spotted in small groups along forest watercourses, often in undergrowth among dead leaves and in holes. Breeding presumably takes place in streams where the tadpoles develop.

Cardioglossa nigromaculata is fairly common species, but it is often missing from seemingly suitable habitat. The overall population is believed to be decreasing because of habitat loss caused by urbanization, agriculture, and logging. It occurs in the Korup National Park and Ebo Forest Reserve in Cameroon.
