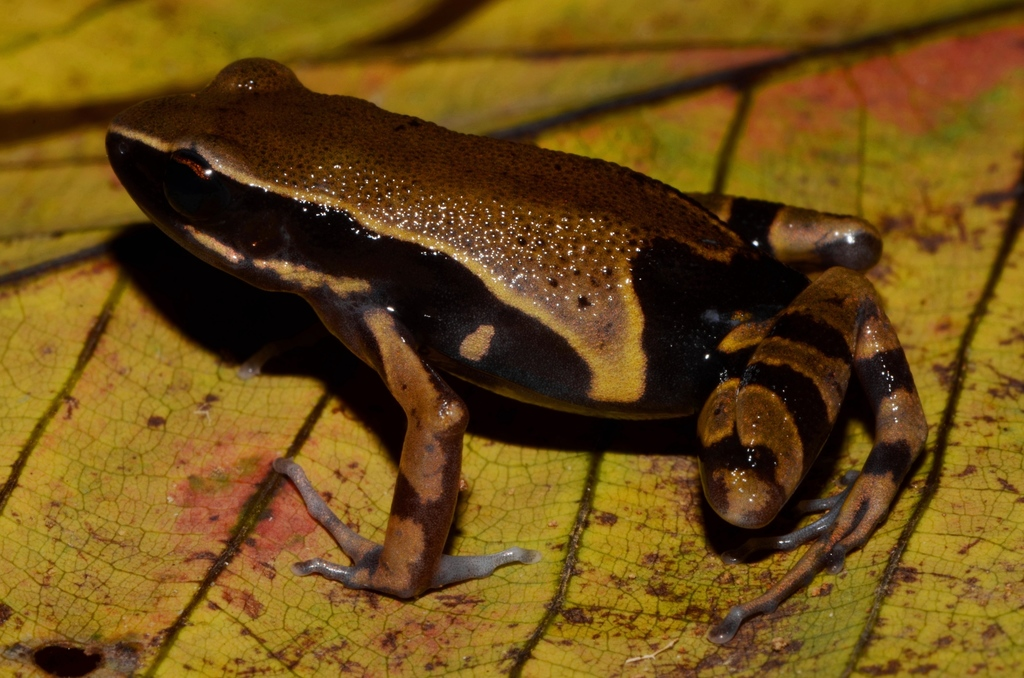

Conservation status
- Endangered (IUCN 3.1)

Scientific classification
- Kingdom: Animalia
- Phylum: Chordata
- Class: Amphibia
- Order: Anura
- Family: Arthroleptidae
- Genus: Cardioglossa
- Species: C. annulata

Binomial name
- Cardioglossa annulata Hirschfeld, Blackburn, Burger, Zassi-Boulou & Rödel, 2015

= Cardioglossa annulata =

Species of frog

Cardioglossa annulata, the annulated long-fingered frog, is a species of frog in the family Arthroleptidae. It is native to a 610 km^{2} (240 sq mi) area in Congo at elevations of 634 to 744 m (2,080 to 2,441 ft). It is found in forests and wetlands. It was first described in 2015.

== Description ==
Adults measure between 22.8 to 32.9 mm (0.90 to 1.30 in), with a single juvenile measuring 21.5 mm (0.85 in). The species is relatively long with a sharp snout. Its extremities are all elongated and slender. Each subarticular tubercle on the pointed fingers and toes spans the breadth of the digit. The infratympanal line serves as an identifying feature. Three little black spots are scattered across its brown back. The fingertips, dorsal thigh, lower back, and groin all have white spines.
