= Cardioglossa escalerae =

Conservation status
- Least Concern (IUCN 3.1)

Scientific classification
- Kingdom: Animalia
- Phylum: Chordata
- Class: Amphibia
- Order: Anura
- Family: Arthroleptidae
- Genus: Cardioglossa
- Species: C. escalerae

Binomial name
- Cardioglossa escalerae Boulenger, 1903

Species of frog

Cardioglossa escalerae is a species of frog in the family Arthroleptidae. It is found in Cameroon, Central African Republic, Democratic Republic of the Congo, Equatorial Guinea, possibly Republic of the Congo, and possibly Gabon. Its natural habitats are subtropical or tropical moist lowland forests, rivers, and heavily degraded former forest. It is threatened by habitat loss.
