= Idabato =

Town in Southwest Province, Cameroon

- arrondissement
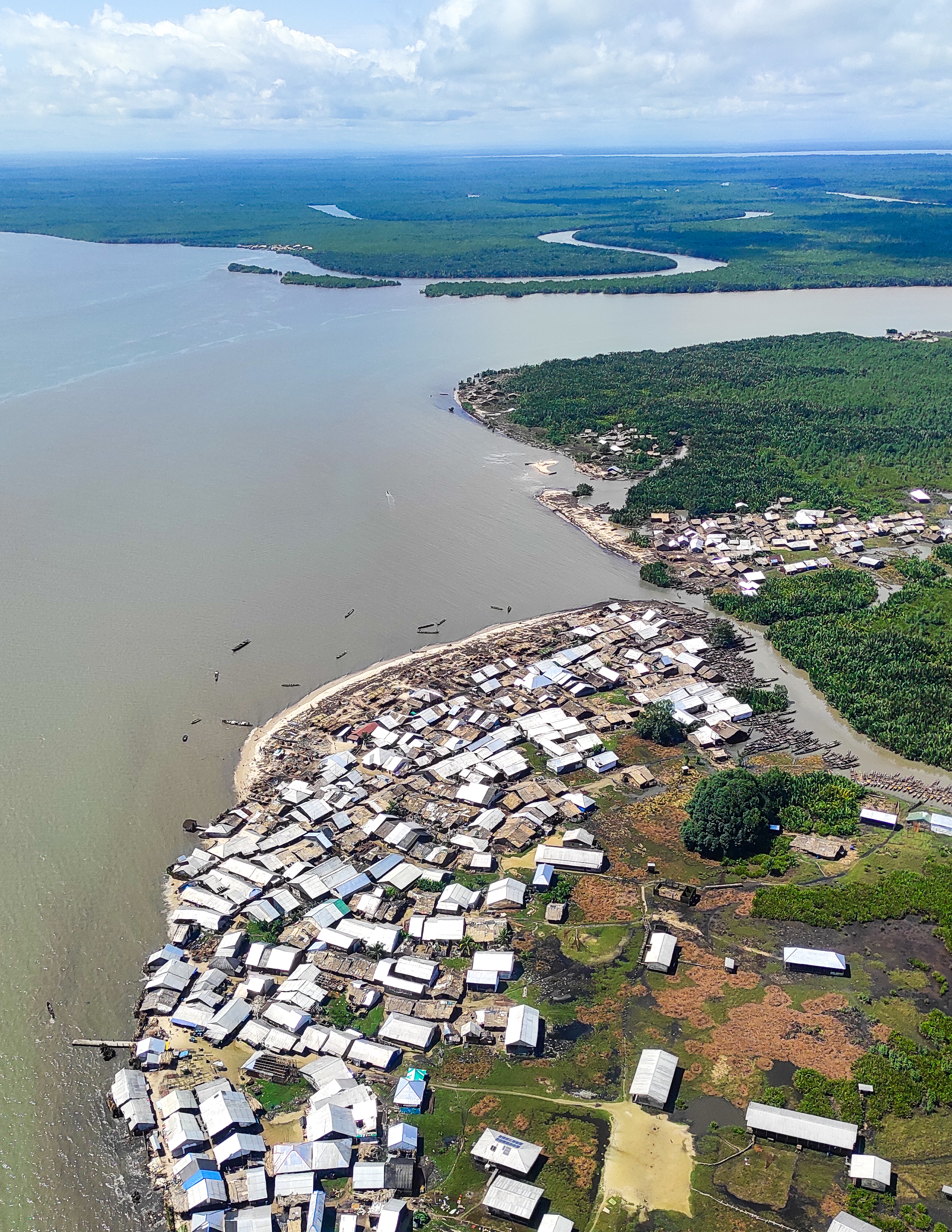
- Country: Cameroon
- Province: Southwest Province
- Department: Ndian

Idabato is a commune and arrondissement in the Ndian département, Southwest Province, western Cameroon.

== See also ==
- Communes of Cameroon
