= Kombo-Abedimo =

Village and arrondissement in Southwest Province, Cameroon

- arrondissement
- Location within Cameroon Location within Africa
- Coordinates: 4.6621°N 8.5177°E
- Country: Cameroon
- Province: Southwest Province
- Department: Ndian

Kombo-Abedimo is a commune and arrondissement in the Ndian département, Southwest Province, western Cameroon.
