= Kombo-Itindi =

Commune and arrondissement in Southwest Province, Cameroon

Coordinates: 4°39′N 8°46′E

Kombo Itindi
- arrondissement
- Location within Cameroon
- Country: Cameroon
- Province: Southwest Province
- Department: Ndian

Kombo Itindi is a commune and arrondissement in the Ndian département, Southwest Province, western Cameroon. A coastal town on the Atlantic Ocean, it is a fishing community.
