= Cardioglossa pulchra =

Conservation status
- Endangered (IUCN 3.1)

Scientific classification
- Kingdom: Animalia
- Phylum: Chordata
- Class: Amphibia
- Order: Anura
- Family: Arthroleptidae
- Genus: Cardioglossa
- Species: C. pulchra

Binomial name
- Cardioglossa pulchra Schiøtz, 1963

Species of frog

Cardioglossa pulchra is a species of frog in the family Arthroleptidae. It is found in the Cameroon Range in western Cameroon (excluding Mount Cameroon) and in the Obudu Plateau in adjacent eastern Nigeria. Common name black long-fingered frog has been coined for it.

== Description ==
Males measure 23–33 mm (0.9–1.3 in) and females 31–34 mm (1.2–1.3 in) in snout–vent length. Males have extremely long third fingers and spines in the fingers and in the groin; females lack these characteristics (though no female specimens of this particular species were inspected). Dorsal markings, typical for the genus Cardioglossa, are fused to a broad black stripe that extends over the entire dorsum. The white line running under the tympanum is absent.

The tadpoles have a depressed, elliptical body and a long tail with broadly rounded tip. The largest specimen (Gosner stage 29) measures 25 mm (1.0 in) in total length, most of which is tail: body length is only 8 mm (0.3 in).

== Habitat and conservation ==
Cardioglossa pulchra occurs in submontane and montane forests along fast-flowing streams; at higher elevations it occurs also along forest edges. It tolerates some deforestation. Its altitudinal range is 900–1,800 m (3,000–5,900 ft) above sea level. Breeding takes place in streams. Tadpoles have been found in a stream surrounded by farm bush vegetation, without any trees growing on the riverbanks. The tadpoles were found near the riverbank, hiding in the sandy mud or between stones.

Cardioglossa pulchra can be common during the breeding season. The species is threatened by habitat loss caused by agricultural encroachment (including plantations of tree crops), expanding human settlements, and extraction of wood for firewood and building materials. It occurs in the Bafut-Ngemba Forest Reserve in Cameroon and in the Cross River National Park in Nigeria.
