= Toko, Cameroon =

Coordinates: 4°53′27″N 9°06′09″E

Toko(Ndian)
- commune
- Interactive map of Toko(Ndian)
- Country: Cameroon
- Region: Southwest Region
- Department: Ndian
- Arrondissement: Ekondo-Titi

Toko is a commune in the Ndian departement of the Southwest Region of Cameroon.
