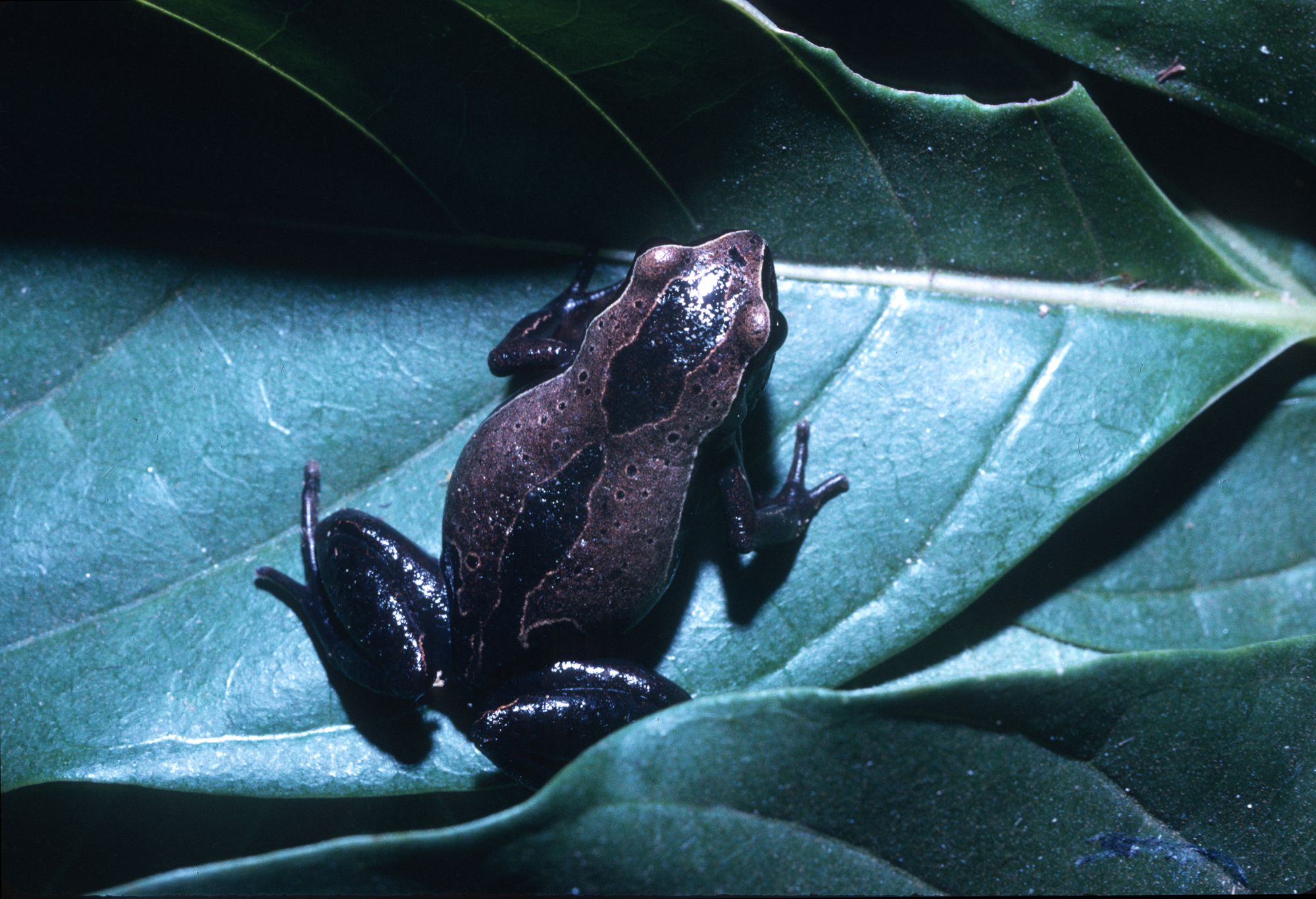

Conservation status
- Critically Endangered (IUCN 3.1)

Scientific classification
- Kingdom: Animalia
- Phylum: Chordata
- Class: Amphibia
- Order: Anura
- Family: Arthroleptidae
- Genus: Cardioglossa
- Species: C. manengouba

Binomial name
- Cardioglossa manengouba Blackburn, 2008

= Cardioglossa manengouba =

Species of frog

Cardioglossa manengouba is a species of frog from the Cardioglossa genus. It is only found in Cameroon's Mount Manengouba. Its hue is reddish-brown and its range spans across 10 km^{2} (3.9 sq mi).
