= Dikome-Balue =

- commune
- Interactive map of Dikome-Balue
- Coordinates: 4°54′45″N 9°14′28″E
- Country: Cameroon
- Region: Southwest
- Division: Ndian
- Sub-division: Dikome-Balue
- Climate: Am

Dikome Balue is the headquarters of the Dikome Balue district and has an area of 500 km^{2} (190 sq mi) situated in the heart of a rainforest region of Ndian Division in the southwest region of Cameroon.

== Geography ==
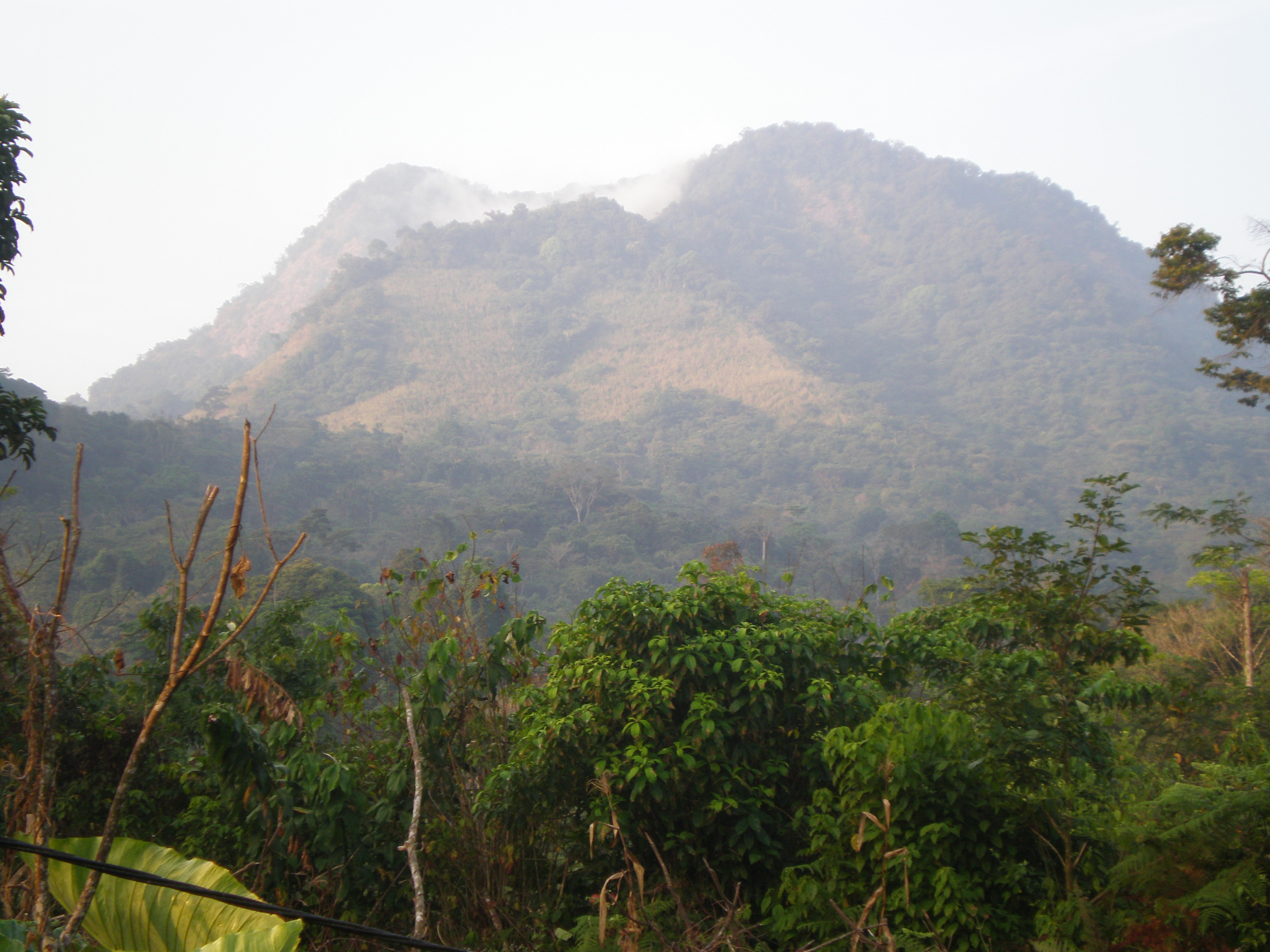
Mount Rata in den Rumpibergen

The village-town is situated within the Rumpi highlands with its peak at Mt. Rumpi (commonly called Rata by the indigenes) towering to 1,765 m (5,791 ft) above sea level. A composite volcano of the Cambrian type that has not erupted in our recent times. This mountain range connects with the Manenguba, kupe, Fako and Equatorial Guinea highlands. The hydrographic network is abundant, with 49 smaller rivers and 16 waterfalls.

This area is inhabited by a Bantu people who originated from the Congo Basin of Central Africa. The dialect spoken here is Lolue (a type of Oroko) with about 98% similarity with the other ethnic dialects like Mbonge, Bima, Londo, and Batanga.

Oroko language has a 75% similarity with the Lingala (Kikongo) spoken in Congo and Zaire. The main difference between the two is that Lingala is often mixed with French while Oroko is mixed with English or just simply spoken with no foreign accents. Oroko and Bakongo people of Congo and Zaire share almost the same cultures

== People ==
The district is the seat of the Dikome-Balue Chiefdom, a 2nd degree traditional chiefdom, home to the Balue people, and recognized by the Ministry of Territorial Administration and Decentralization.

There were 1713 inhabitants in 1953, 2,610 in 1968-1969 and 4,239 in 1972, mainly of the Balue ethnic group, hence its name. At the 2005 census, the district had a population of 13,364, of which 4,714 resided at the seat at Dikome-Balue village-town.

In 1900, Georg Spellenberg, of the Basel Mission, moved to Dikome to study the possibility of developing missionary action in the Rumpi Hills. The inhabitants of Dikome-Balue are mainly Christians, of various denominations, though mostly Presbyterians.

Michael Elangwe Namaya, a former minister, was born in Dikome-Balue in 1940.

== Economy ==
Agriculture is practiced by the majority of the population (99%). Cocoa is its major produce along with coffee, green tea, cocoyam (or taro), plantain, pepper and cassava. Livestock farming, hunting, fishing, beekeeping, and the exploitation of wood provide other resources and help maintain the district's economy.

Due to its location in the mountain regions, most of the roads leading to the district are underdeveloped, making it hard to access by car.

Literacy levels within the district are relatively low due to lack of development. There are fewer schools, with limited resources, and fewer classrooms. Most of the children work with their families to farm the land.
