= Rumpi Hills =

Mountain range in Cameroon

- Location within Cameroon

Highest point
- Elevation: 1,800 m (5,900 ft)
- Coordinates: 4°50′N 9°07′E

Geography
- Location: Cameroon
- Parent range: Cameroon line

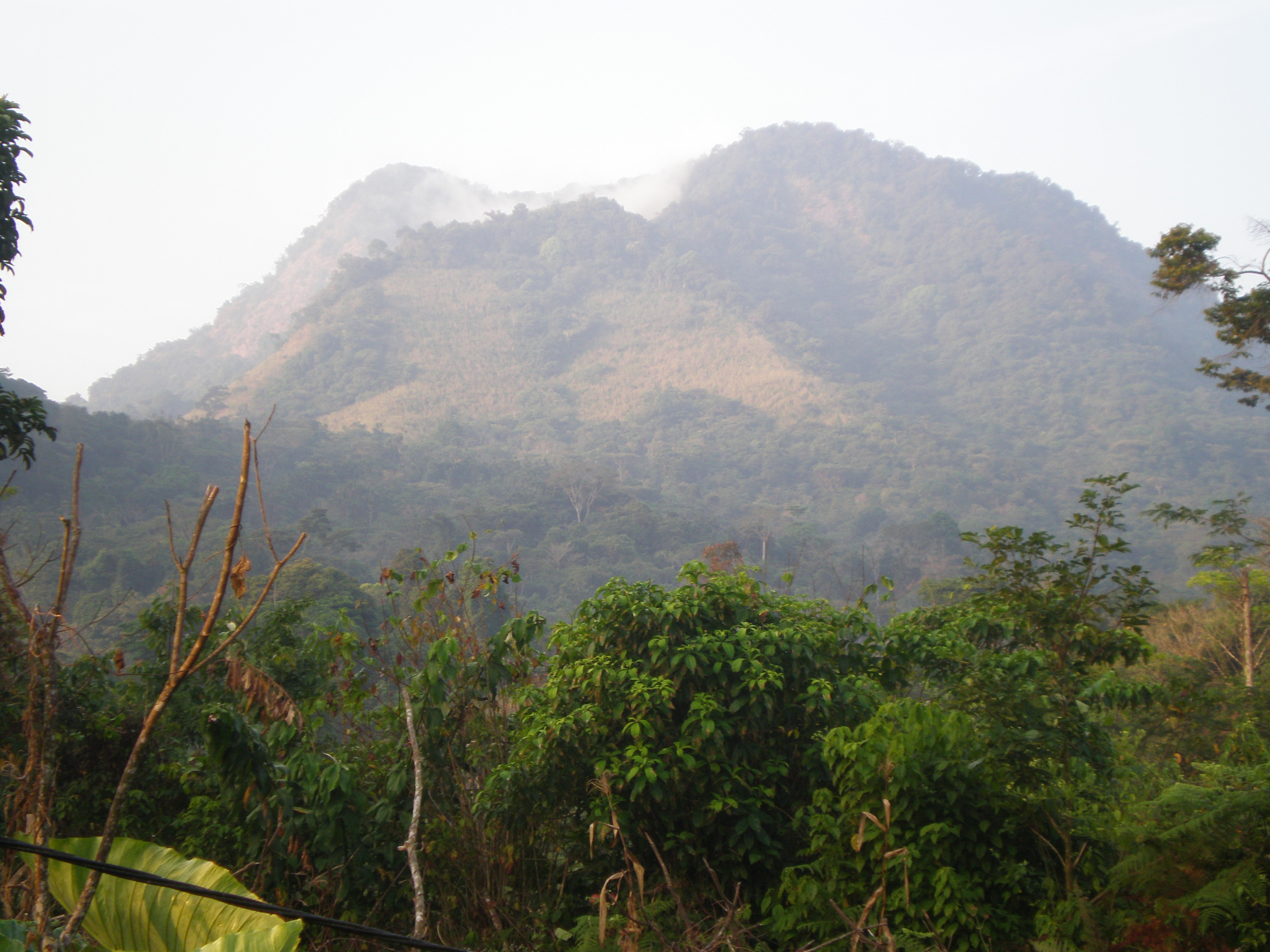
Mount Rata Peak

The Rumpi Hills are an undulating mountain range with its highest peak, Mount Rata about 1,800 m (5,900 ft) located between the villages of Dikome Balue and Mofako Balue, Ndian division in the Southwest region of Cameroon. The hills are situated at 4°50’N 9°07’E, cutting across four local councils, with the eastern slopes in Dikome Balue, southern slopes in Ekondo Titi, western slopes in Mundemba, and northern slopes in Toko local councils respectively. These hills are located about 80 km (50 mi) north of Mount Cameroon; about 50 km (31 mi) west of the Bakossi Mountains and some 15 km (9.3 mi) southeast of the Korup National Park.

The Rumpi hills are covered by more than 2,300 km^{2} (890 sq mi) of a combination of mid-elevation montane, coastal evergreen, and drier northern semi-evergreen forests as well as other vegetation types. About 455 km^{2} (176 sq mi) of this forest forms what is known as the Rumpi Hills Forest Reserve (RHFR). Located in the equatorial forest zone of Cameroon, this area is very rich in plant biodiversity ranging from fungi to angiosperms.

Notwithstanding this plant biodiversity, variations do occur in the distribution of the forest ecosystems in this area. This variation in the distribution of forest ecosystems, is due to the changing agricultural landscape especially along the southern slopes of these hills. Apart from oil palm (Elaeis guineensis) owned by the agro-industrial company, Pamol Plantations PLC, and sprouting smallholder plantations, other dominant tree species do exist. These include species such as

- Chlorophora excelsa (iroko)
- Rhizophora racemosa
- Drepanocarpus lunatus (red mangrove)
- Dracaenea buenea (peace plant)
- Nypa fruticans (nypa palm)
- Entandrophragma cylindricum prague (sapele)
- Lophira alata (azobe)
- Distemonanthus benthamianus (movingui)
- Baillonella toxisperma (moabi)

Other species include

- Eucalyptus camaldulensis
- Cola nitida (kola)
- Prunus africana (African cherry)
- Khaya anthotheca (East African mahogany)

as well as non-timber forest species such as

- Raphia spp (raffia)
- Laccosperma spp (rattan)

Additionally, many tropical montane mammal, bird, reptile and amphibian species such as

- Mandrillus leucophaeus (drill)
- Myosorex rumpii, (Rumpi mouse shrew)
- Hystrix cristata (crested porcupine)
- Columba albinucha (white-naped pigeon)
- Malaconotus gladiator (green-breasted bushshrike)
- Conraua robusta (Cameroon slippery frog)
- Trichobatrachus robustus (hairy frog)

are present.

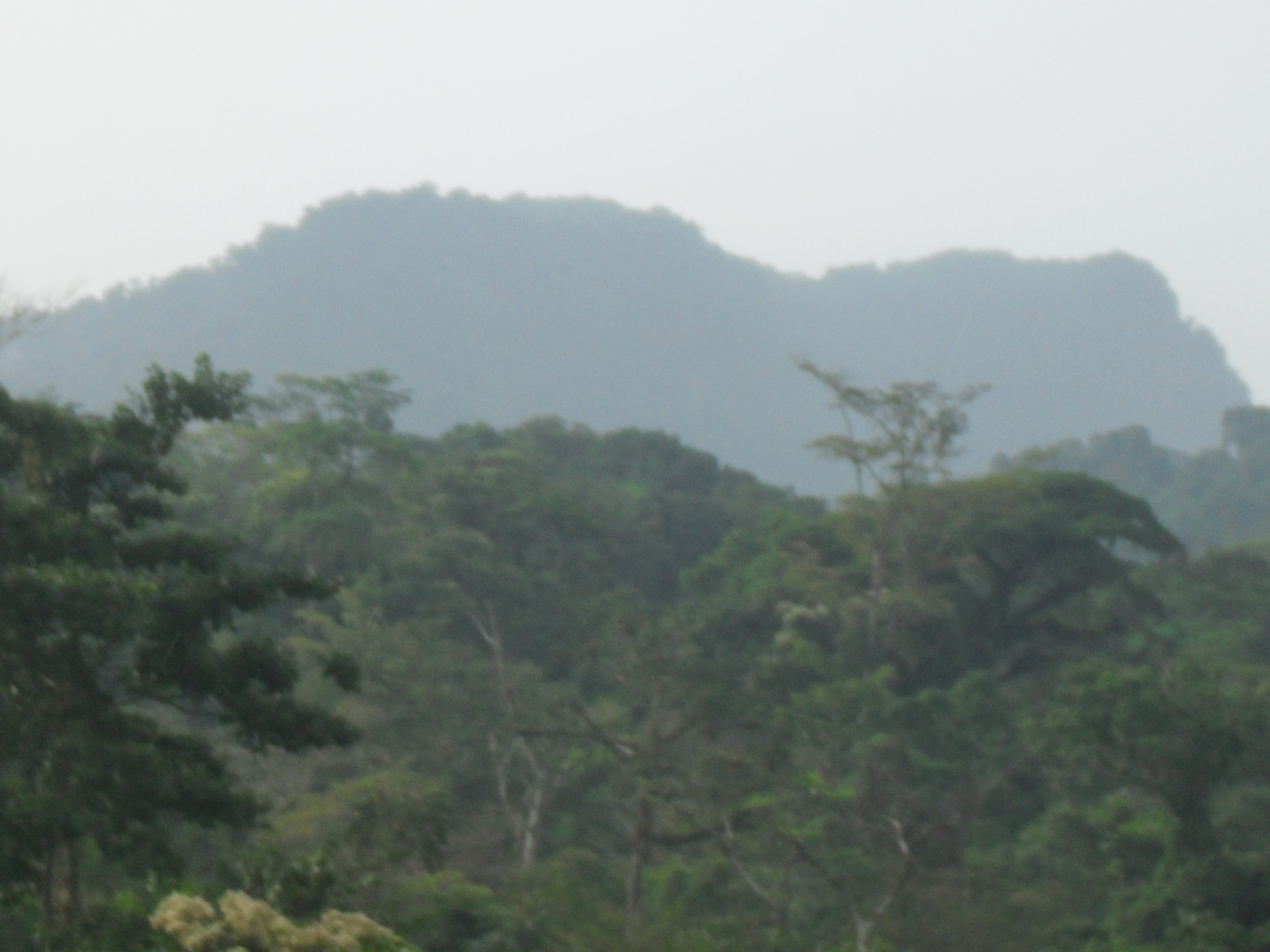
Rata Mountain (Peak of Rumpi Hills) as seen from Mofako Balue, Ndian division of Cameroon.

== Classification of the Rumpi Hills forests ==
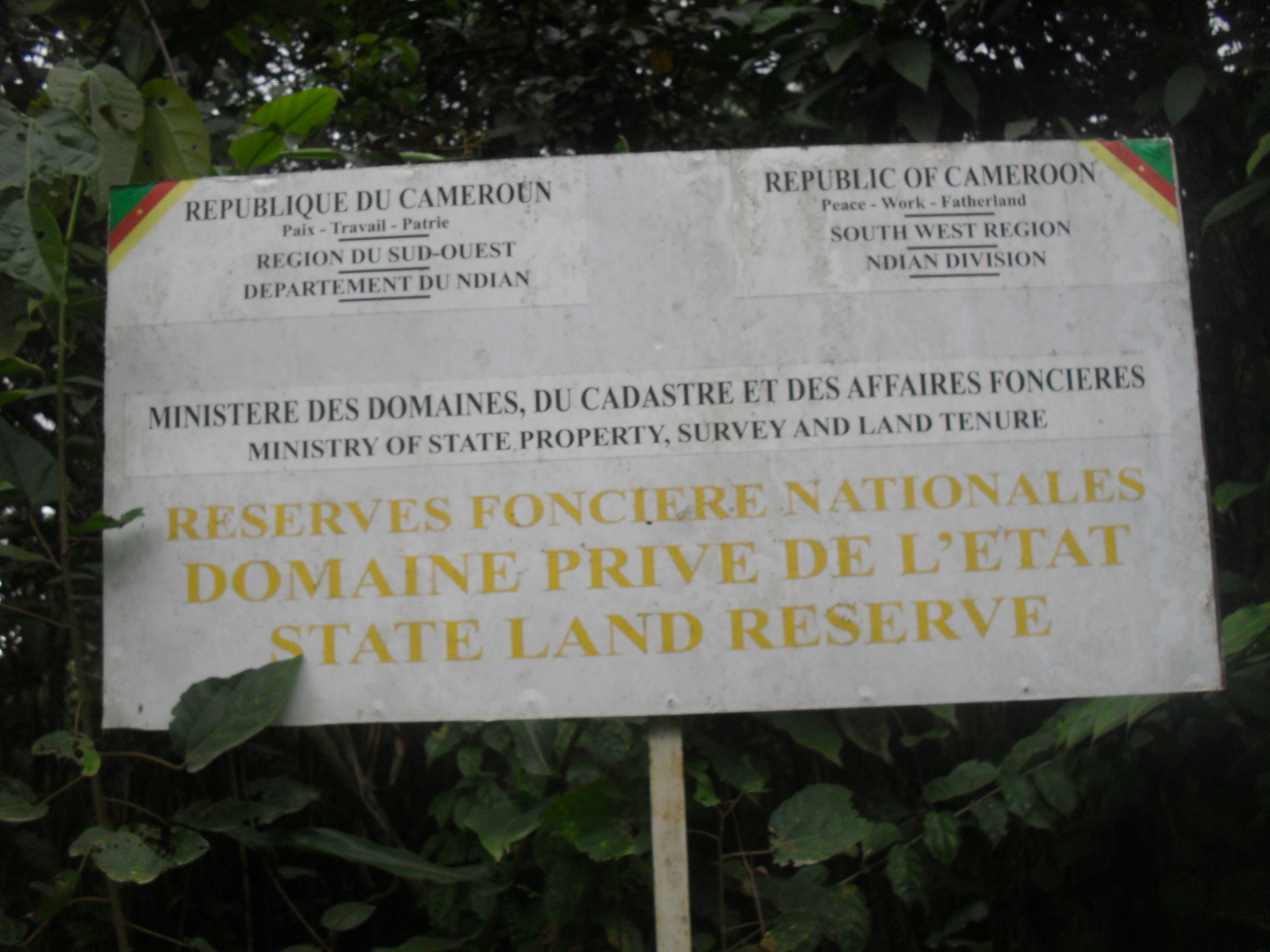
Rumpi Hills reserve sign post

The forests of the Rumpi hills form part of the Cross-Sanaga-Bioko coastal forests which are a tropical humid broadleaf forest ecoregion of west–central Africa. The ecoregion includes the lowland and coastal forests of southeastern Nigeria, southwestern Cameroon and the lowlands of Bioko island, covering an estimated 52,200 km^{2} (20,200 sq mi). The forests cut across Nigeria's Cross River to Cameroon's River Sanaga in the southeast and about 300 km (190 mi) from the edges of the Atlantic Ocean coast.

White (1983) carried-out a phytogeographic vegetation classification of this lowland forests ecoregion. These lowland forests are situated in the Lower Guinea zone of the Guineo-Congolian region of rich and endemic biodiversity composed of animal and plant species. These are mainly hygrophilous coastal evergreen rain forests which may contain other mixed moist semi-evergreen rain forests according to elevation gradient. In these forests, some trees may reach 50 m (160 ft) tall usually in different vegetation levels (multi-storey canopy levels). Most common plant families (with regards to species density and distribution) are Annonaceae, Leguminosae, Euphorbiaceae and Rubiaceae.

Despite having mixed vegetation, these forests have Caesalpinioid plants as the dominant vegetation particularly along elevation gradients 400 to 1,800 m (1,300 to 5,900 ft) elevation). Most often, the vegetation structure becomes sparse above 1,800 m (5,900 ft) elevation containing mainly montane bamboo forests, shrubs and grasslands. Afromontane plant species such as Prunus africana and Nuxia congesta are dominant.

Mount Fako and the island of Bioko are located above 900 m (3,000 ft) and in a separate ecoregion called the Mount Cameroon and Bioko montane forests. These montane forests extend inland to other highland forests of Cameroon and towards the Cross–Niger transition forests ecoregion to the west. Moving further inland to the north, east and south, these coastal forests mosaic to the Guinean forest–savanna, the Northern Congolian forest–savanna, and the Atlantic equatorial coastal forests (mainly along the River Sanaga).

It rains heavily throughout the year giving a wet climate especially with many rivers including the Cross River, River Sanaga, River Mungo, River Ndian, River Wouri and River Niger that run across the landscape. Aside rivers, the region is also home to a number of small circular craters, produced by volcanic explosions which have subsequently formed crater lakes, including Lake Barombi Mbo, Dissoni/Soden, Barombi Kotto, Benakuma, Nyos and Monoun. The ancient nature and isolation has led to a high level of endemism in these lakes where over 75% of the fish species and approximately one-third of the aquatic insects are endemic. For instance, Lake Dissoni/Soden, a small volcanic lake covering an estimated 1.25 km^{2} (0.48 sq mi), is located at the southeastern slopes of the Rumpi hills. The lake flows into a stream that eventually empties into the River Meme. There are only three fish species in the lake which are all endemic including Poeciliid (Procatopus lacustris) which may be related to Procatopus similis more abundant in surrounding rivers, streams and lakes. An undescribed catfish (Clarias spp) and barb (Barbus spp) as well as the atyid shrimp Caridina sodenensis are endemic species to this lake.

Most of the region is located on the African Precambrian shield which contains principally basement rocks. Over the years, the weathering of these basement rocks has created dense layers of leached and poor red earth soils. Meanwhile, along the Atlantic Equatorial coastal forests, the continuous deposition of sand, rocks and silt has created extensive muddy banks, mangrove swamps and sandy beaches. Mount Fako and Bioko are active volcanoes and therefore their surrounding soils are rich which are from volcanic ash and pyroclastic lava and ash.

== Sources ==
1. Agricultural systems and food security in Toko, Mundemba and Nguti, in South West Cameroon. A research report by ACDIC (PDF). Greenpeace Africa. 2012. Archived (PDF) from the original on 13 February 2019.
2. "Cameroon Crater Lakes". WWF. 2015.
3. Cheek, M; Cable, S; Hepper, F N; Ndam, N; Watts, J (1996). van der Masen, G; van der Burgt, X; van Medenbach de Rooy, J (eds.). Mapping plant biodiversity on Mount Cameroon. The biodiversity of African plants. Proceedings XIVth AETFAT Congress (1994). Wageningen, Netherlands: Kluwer Academic Press, Dordrecht. pp. 110–120. doi:10.1007/978-94-009-0285-5_16.
4. Chuyong, G; Kenfack, D; Harms, K; Thomas, W; Condit, R; Comita, L (2011). "Habitat specificity and diversity of tree species in an African wet tropical forest" (PDF). Plant Ecology. 212 (8): 1363–1374. doi:10.1007/s11258-011-9912-4. S2CID 39020878.
5. Etongo, Daniel B; Glover, Edinam K (2012). "Participatory resource mapping for livelihood values derived from the forest in Ekondo-Titi subregion, Cameroon: A gender analysis". International Journal of Forestry Research. 2012 (ArticleID 971068): 9. doi:10.1155/2012/871068.
6. Linder, Joshua M (2013). "African primate diversity threatened by "new wave" of industrial oil palm expansion" (PDF). African Primates. 8: 25–38. Archived (PDF) from the original on 18 February 2019.
7. "Mount Rata and Rumpi Hills Forest Reserve". BirdLife International. 2023.
8. Moyersoen, B; Becker, I; Alexander, J (2001). "Are ectomycorrhizas more abundant than arbuscular mycorrhizas in tropical heath forests?". New Phytologist. 150 (3): 591–599. doi:10.1046/j.1469-8137.2001.00125.x.
9. Mukete, B (2014). "Why is food so scarce? An Analysis of the Ndian food security crisis".
10. Mukete, B; Sun, Y; Etongo, D; Sajjad, S; Abdul, M (2018b). "Assessing the drivers of land use change in the Rumpi hills forest protected area, Cameroon". Journal of Sustainable Forestry. 37 (6): 592–618. doi:10.1080/10549811.2018.1449121. S2CID 90942550.
11. Mukete, B; Sun, Y; Etongo, D; Ekoungoulou, R; Folega, F; Sajjad, S; Ngoe, M; Ndiaye, G (2018c). "Household characteristics and forest resources dependence in the Rumpi hills of Cameroon". Applied Ecology and Environmental Research. 16 (3): 2755–2779. doi:10.15666/aeer/1603_27552779.
12. Mukete, Beckline (2018). A Study on Land Use and Land Cover Changes in the Rumpi Hills Forests of Cameroon (PhD thesis). Department of Forest Management, Beijing Forestry University, China.
13. Mamonekene, Victor (2008). "Freshwater Ecoregions of the World – 518: Northern Gulf of Guinea Drainages - Bioko". Institut de Développement Rural, Université Marien Ngouabi-Brazzaville, Brazzaville, Congo: FEOW. Archived from the original on 27 October 2017.
14. Richard, Jasmine; Clark, Paul F (2009) [1995]. "African caridina (Crustacea: Decapoda: Caridea: Atyidae): redescriptions of C. africana Kingsley, 1882, C. togoensis Hilgendorf, 1893, C. natalensis Bouvier, 1925 and C. roubaudi Bouvier, 1925 with descriptions of 14 new species" (PDF). Zootaxa: 1–75. ISBN 978-1869773205.
15. Tchigio, Innocent (2007). Opportunities for community-based wildlife management : a case study from the Korup region, Cameroon. Cuvillier, Gottingen. p. 190. ISBN 978-3867272391.
16. Trewavas, Ethelwynn (1962). "Fishes of the Crater Lakes of the Northwestern Cameroons" (PDF). 13. Bonner Zoologische Beitraege: 146–190. Archived (PDF) from the original on 18 February 2019.
17. White, Frank (1983). Vegetation of Africa: a descriptive memoir to accompany the Unesco/AETFAT/UNSO vegetation map of Africa. Natural Resources Research. Vol. 20. Paris: UNESCO. ISBN 978-9231019555.
18. Woolley, Alan Robert (2001). Alkaline rocks and carbonatites of the world, Part 3. Geological Society. p. 37. ISBN 978-1862390836.
19. Yerima, Bernard Palmer Kfuban; Van Ranst, Eric (2005). Major Soil Classification Systems Used in the Tropics: Soils of Cameroon. Trafford Publishing. p. 144. ISBN 978-1412058537.
