= Cardioglossa inornata =

Conservation status
- Data Deficient (IUCN 3.1)

Scientific classification
- Kingdom: Animalia
- Phylum: Chordata
- Class: Amphibia
- Order: Anura
- Family: Arthroleptidae
- Genus: Cardioglossa
- Species: C. inornata

Binomial name
- Cardioglossa inornata Laurent, 1952

Species of frog

Cardioglossa inornata is a species of frog from the Cardioglossa genus. It is native to the Republic of Congo and the Democratic Republic of Congo. The species was first described in 1952 by Laurent. It lives in forests and wetlands and has an elevation range of 1,900 to 2,000 m (6,200 to 6,600 ft).
