= Cardioglossa alsco =

Conservation status
- Endangered (IUCN 3.1)

Scientific classification
- Kingdom: Animalia
- Phylum: Chordata
- Class: Amphibia
- Order: Anura
- Family: Arthroleptidae
- Genus: Cardioglossa
- Species: C. alsco

Binomial name
- Cardioglossa alsco Herrmann, Herrmann, Schmitz, and Böhme, 2004

Species of frog

Cardioglossa alsco is a species of frog in the family Arthroleptidae. It is endemic to Cameroon and is known from its type locality on southern slopes of the Tschabal Mbabo Mountains as well as from the Gotel Mountains, both in the Adamawa Region. Its range might extend into Nigeria. The specific name alsco is a patronym for the American Linen Supply Company (ALSCO). The company's German branch supported the expedition during which this species was discovered.

== Description ==
Adult males measure 24–30 mm (0.94–1.18 in) and adult females 25–34 mm (0.98–1.34 in) in snout–vent length. The snout is rounded. The tympanum is visible. Males have a hypertrophied third finger. The toes have small but distinct discs and rudimentary webbing. The dorsum is tan and has three large dark consecutive blotches that may be well-defined but also show a varying degree fading, depending on a specimen. There is a broad black lateral band that runs from the tip of the snout through the eye and then descends towards venter at the mid-body. The flanks are immaculate pink. The arms and legs are dorsally tan and have some thin, broken black bands. The venter is blue and has varying degree of black speckling.

== Habitat and conservation ==
Cardioglossa alsco is found in montane gallery forests at elevations of 1,700–2,100 m (5,600–6,900 ft) above sea level. It is associated with streams, the presumed habitat for the tadpoles. The types were found under large stones around shallow pools, adjacent to a creek running in a gallery forest. Males were calling at night during the dry season.

This species is threatened by habitat loss due to the clearance of forest for pasture; however, the remaining forest is difficult to access and is less susceptible to this threat. The habitat remains vulnerable to threat of fire. Cardioglossa alsco is not known to occur in any protected areas.
