= Cardioglossa schioetzi =

Conservation status
- Vulnerable (IUCN 3.1)

Scientific classification
- Kingdom: Animalia
- Phylum: Chordata
- Class: Amphibia
- Order: Anura
- Family: Arthroleptidae
- Genus: Cardioglossa
- Species: C. schioetzi

Binomial name
- Cardioglossa schioetzi Amiet, 1982

Species of amphibian

Cardioglossa schioetzi is a species of frogs in the family Arthroleptidae. It is found in the mountains of Cameroon and eastern Nigeria. Specifically, it has been recorded from the Oshie-Obudu Range, Gotel Mountains, Mount Oku, and Mount Mbam. It is a generally poorly known species.

== Etymology ==
The specific name schioetzi honours Arne Schiøtz, a Danish herpetologist who has worked extensively on African tree frogs. Common name Acha Tugi long-fingered frog has been coined for this species (Acha Tugi is the type locality).

== Description ==
Males measure 23–27 mm (0.9–1.1 in) in snout–vent length; the upper limit for the males also represents the maximum size recorded for the species. There is a white line that runs under the eye, then curves sigmoidally up and terminates just behind the external naris. The characteristic dorsal blotches are not joined to form an hour-glass pattern.

== Habitat and conservation ==
Cardioglossa schioetzi is occurs in and near relict patches of montane forest at elevations of 1,640–2,010 m (5,380–6,590 ft) above sea level. It can also occur in secondary vegetation where no trees remain. Some specimens have been found around streams, the presumed breeding habitat of this species.

This species is threatened by habitat loss caused by expanding agricultural activities, human settlements, overgrazing, and logging. It occurs in the Cross River National Park in Nigeria.
