= Cardioglossa occidentalis =

Conservation status
- Least Concern (IUCN 3.1)

Scientific classification
- Kingdom: Animalia
- Phylum: Chordata
- Class: Amphibia
- Order: Anura
- Family: Arthroleptidae
- Genus: Cardioglossa
- Species: C. occidentalis

Binomial name
- Cardioglossa occidentalis Blackburn, Kosuch, Schmitz, Burger, Wagner, Gonwouo, Hillers & Rödel, 2008

Species of frog

Cardioglossa occidentalis, the western long-fingered frog, is a species of frog in the Cardioglossa genus native to Côte d'Ivoire, Liberia, Sierra Leone, Ghana and Guinea. They occur inland in wetlands and forests. They are found in elevations up to 650 m (2,130 ft). Despite the declining population, it is listed as Least Concern by the IUCN.

== Description ==
The body is long and its hue is gray to dark brown. Males are smaller than females and have a length of 25.4 to 27.3 mm (1.00 to 1.07 in), females measure around 26.2 to 30.3 mm (1.03 to 1.19 in). There is a noticeable, almost conical palmar tubercle on the palms. On the third finger's dorsal surface, between the metacarpal-phalangeal joint and the fingertip, there are prominent spines running the length of the finger. The caudal part of the dorsum, the inguinal region, and the proximal thigh of males are covered in tiny conical spines. There is a proximodistally extending, thick, wavy black line on the rear surface of the thigh. Moreover, there is a black patch on the inguinal area.
