= Ekondo-Titi =

- arrondissement
- Location within Cameroon Location within Africa
- Coordinates: 4.60139°N 9.03889°E
- Country: Cameroon
- Region: Southwest Region
- Department: Ndian

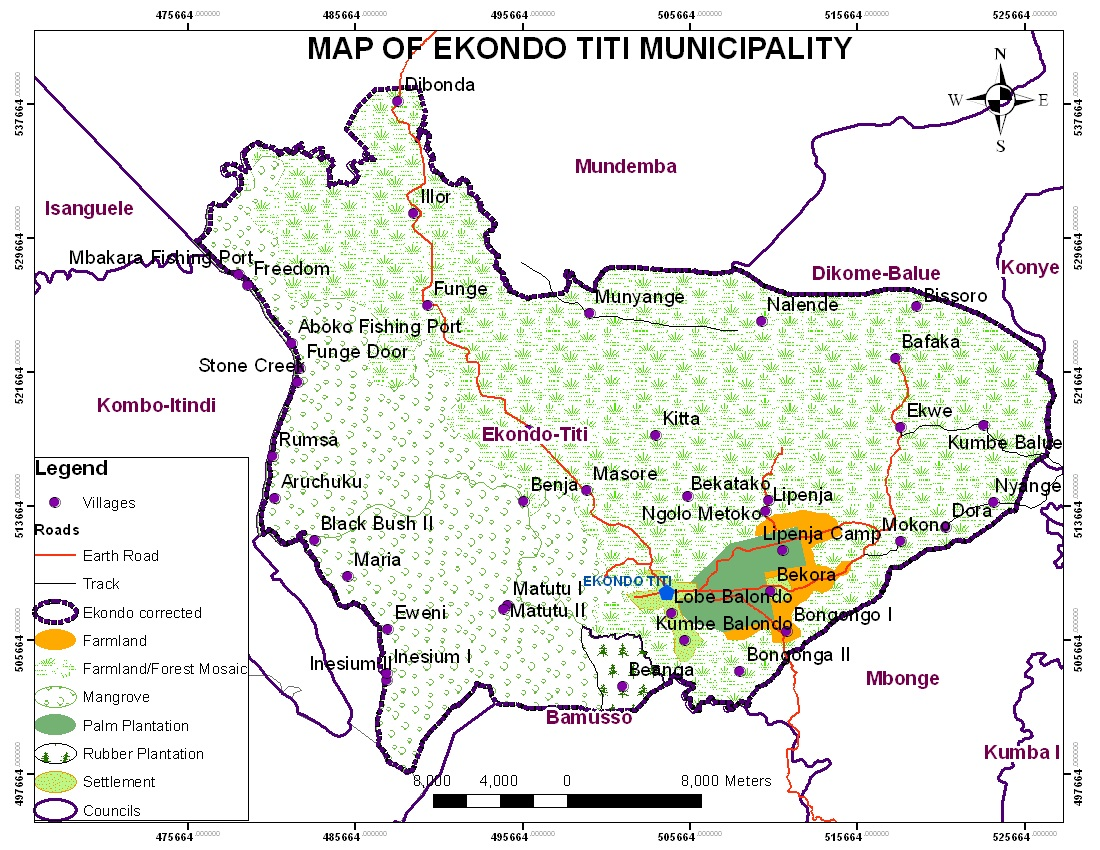
Map of Ekondo Titi Municipality

Ekondo-Titi is a commune and arrondissement in the Ndian department, Southwest Province, western Cameroon.

Ekondo Titi is a suburban town and capital of the Ekondo Titi Sub Division. It is located in Ndian Division of the South West region of the Republic of Cameroon. The town is indigenous to the Balondo people in the coastal southwest region of Cameroon.

== Economy ==
Being a suburban area, the economy is predominantly agricultural with a strong wave of plantation agriculture in the area. The leading agricultural state corporation PAMOL is located in Lobe Estate. There is an ample supply of food crops in the area.

== Transportation ==
Ekondo Titi is a town with a manageable transport network that is adversely impacted by the rains during the wet seasons.

== History ==
=== 2021 massacre ===
On November 24, 2021, Anglophone gunmen stormed a bilingual school in the locality, killing five civilians, including one teacher and four children.

=== 2022 bombing ===
On March 2, 2022, Anglophone separatists bombed a car carrying numerous politicians and local officials and fired gunshots at the victims. All six people on board died, including Mayor Nanji Kenneth and sub-prefect Timothée Aboloa. A lieutenant later died of his wounds. The vehicle bombing also killed a local representative of the Cameroon People's Democratic Movement, a gendarme, and the driver.

== See also ==
- Communes of Cameroon
