= Ndian =

- Department
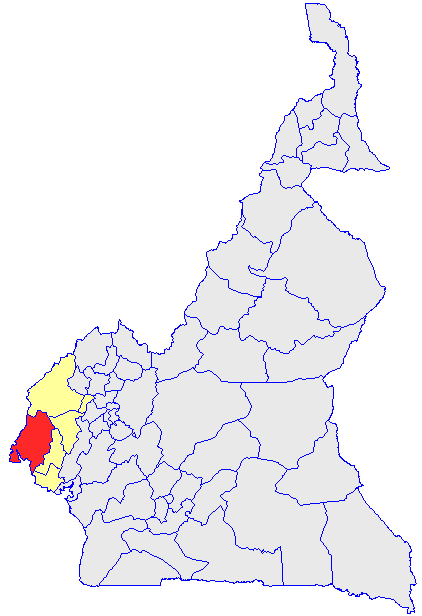
- Department location in Cameroon
- Country: Cameroon
- Region: Southwest Region
- Capital: Mundemba

Area
  - Total: 6,626 km^{2} (2,558 sq mi)

Population (2005)
  - Total: 362,201
  - Density: 54.66/km^{2} (141.6/sq mi)
- Time zone: UTC+1 (WAT)

Ndian is a department of Southwest Region in Cameroon. It is located in the humid tropical rainforest zone about 650 km (400 mi) southeast of Yaoundé, the capital.

== History ==
Ndian division was formed in 1975 from parts of Kumba and Victoria divisions and is one of six administrative units that constitute the Southwest Region. Its headquarters is in Mundemba and other major towns include Ekondo Titi, Bamusso, Isangele, Toko, Bekora and Dikome Balue. A total of nine municipalities (Bamusso, Dikome Balue, Ekondo Titi, Idabato, Isangele, Kumbo Abedimo, Kumbo Itindi, Mundemba and Toko) make up the division and spread across an estimated surface area of about 6,626 km^{2} (2,558 sq mi) (25% of the region). The division is linked to other major towns of Cameroon (such as Kumba in the Meme) by the national road N16 and which passes through Ekondo Titi onwards to Mundemba and Isangele.

== Geography ==
The division borders the Federal Republic of Nigeria to the west, Fako division to the south, Manyu division to the north and Meme and Kupe Muanenguba divisions to the east. A mangroves and creeks dominated estuary forms a very low and indented point of contact with the sea in the Rio del Rey estuary. This is in the easternmost part of the Gulf of Guinea known as the Bight of Biafra and which makes up over 35% of Ndian division. This estuary also forms the delta zone of the Ndian River with enormous ongoing marine erosion due to offshore oil drilling. Apart from this amphibious area which is dominated by mangroves and creeks, over 25% of the land surface is flat while about 40%, rests on the Rumpi Highlands.

== Population ==
From a 2005 population survey and future projections, the population of Ndian division is estimated at 362201 of which 17% are semi-urban and 83% rural. The average population density is 55/km^{2} (140/sq mi) which drops to an estimated 20/km^{2} (52/sq mi) in the Rumpi hills and maritime areas. Meanwhile, around the semi-urban centers of Ekondo Titi and Mundemba, the population density increases to about 220/km^{2} (570/sq mi).

== Climate ==
The area has two seasons which are, a dry season from November to April and a rainy season from May to October. Annual rainfall ranges from 4,027 to 6,368 mm (158.5 to 250.7 in), with the heaviest rainfalls usually in July and August. Temperature varies little throughout the year with mean monthly maximum temperatures in the dry season being 31.8 °C (89.2 °F) and in the rainy season 18.2 °C (64.8 °F).

The relative humidity is high during most of the year with minimum monthly values ranging between 60% and 98% in Dikome Balue (east) and Toko (north) areas and between 50% and 84% in Mundemba (west) and Ekondo Titi (south) areas. Here also, wind velocities and magnitudes have a generally mild and low nature often varying from 4 to 10 m/s (8.9 to 22.4 mph; 13 to 33 ft/s). Nevertheless, high velocities and magnitudes sometimes occur especially during the passage of squall lines associated with large rainy seasons or regular thunderstorms. These winds usually blow from a southwest to west direction.

== The People ==
The area is populated predominantly by the Oroko people, such as Balue, Ngolo, Bima, Isangele, Balondo, Batanga, and the Efik tribe, who speak similar Bantu languages. The Balue, Ngolo, Bima and Batanga people inhabit the mountainous forest areas where shifting cultivation, hunting and gathering of non-timber forest products (NTFPs) are important activities for the local villagers.

Meanwhile, the Isangele, Balondo and Efik are found in the low-lying and maritime areas where they are mostly involved in agricultural, petty trading and fishing. Christianity is the major religious faith in Ndian division, though many people adhere to their African religious beliefs.

== Ecology ==
The mountainous areas of Ndian division (400–1,800 m [1,300–5,900 ft]) above sea level are covered by sub-montane forests characterized by low but irregular canopy 15–20 m (49–66 ft) tall. These trees may often attain a height of 35 m (115 ft) with a canopy and foliage cover ranging from 60% to 90%. Meanwhile, the shrub layer is about 3 to 7 m (9.8 to 23.0 ft) and which often replaces the tree layer as canopy ranges from closed to very open. Here, the herb layer is closed and may often attain heights above 1 m (39 in). The canopy is usually full of climbers and the cloud forests appearance is as a result of the ever present epiphytes. These broad-leaved evergreen and deciduous trees are branched at low heights with irregular stem shapes. These sub-montane forests are not of great interest for commercial timber exploitation due to very steep slopes hence inaccessibility and the few timber species have very irregular stem structure.

In the easily accessible lowland forests, artisanal logging has occurred over the past decades and has led to regrowth fields and monocrop plantations. Almost all these areas were first used for shifting cultivation by the local farming population for subsistence purposes before being abandoned or converted into monocrop plantations. These farmed areas which may vary from 0.01 to 1 km^{2} (2.5 to 247.1 acres) are usually located within a few kilometers from the village and along main roads or bush paths.

Here, shifting cultivation and agroforestry farming have created fields, weed infested thickets and secondary forest vegetation mostly along the main roads and around villages. These combined reverts to dense and secondary forests have given rise to a mosaic forested landscape with bushes of devil weed or achakasara (Chromolaena odorata) and umbrella tree (Musanga cecropioides).

In this system of shifting cultivation, the farmer clears small plots (up to about 0.02 km^{2} (4.9 acres) of secondary or sometimes dense rain forest depending on his labour and economic potentials. It is followed by burning of the slash at the end of the dry season (February/March) and planting at the onset of the rainy season (April/May). This practice involves the planting of a variety and a combination of crops at the same time and on the same piece of land. These are primary and staple food crops such as cassava, cocoyam, banana and plantain, peanuts, maize and yams.

Traditionally, cocoa (Theobroma cacao) has been the most important cash crop although oil palm (Elaeis guineensis) and coffee (Coffea arabica and Coffea canephora) have usually been cultivated. But recently, large expanses of commercial plantations of oil palm and rubber (Hevea brasiliensis) have been established in the area.

== Subdivisions ==
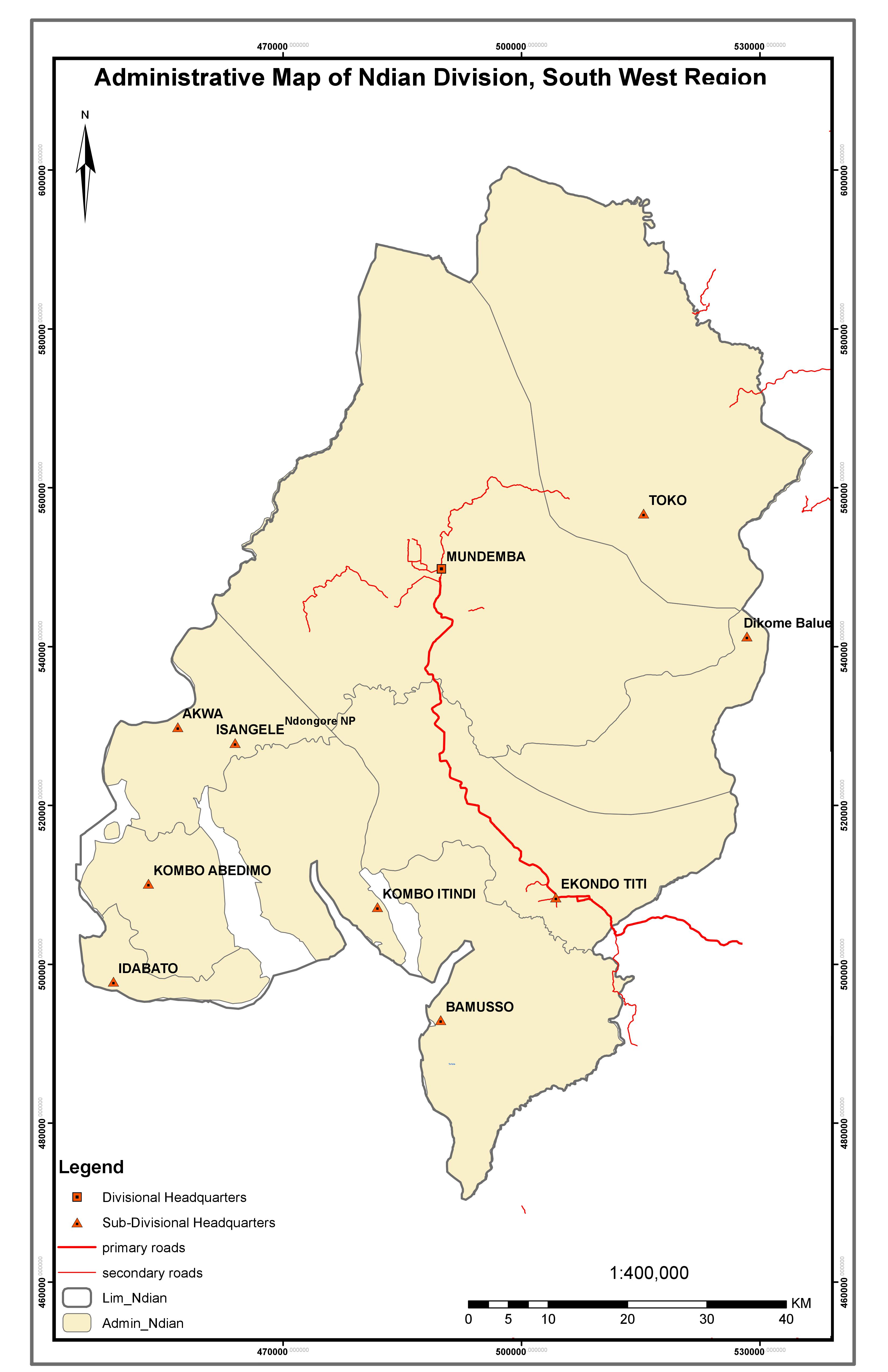
Administrative Map of Ndian division showing all the subdivisions

The department is divided administratively into 9 communes and in turn into villages.

Communes:

District	Capital	Area (km^{2})
Mundemba	Mundemba	1,857
Toko	Toko	1,492
Bamusso	Bamusso	658.3
Ekondo-Titi	Ekondo Titi	696
Dikome-Balue	Dikome Balue	404.7
Kombo-Itindi	Itindi	375.9
Isanguele	Isanguele	332.1
Kombo-Abedimo	Kombo Abedimo	251
Idabato	Idabato	120.8

== Sources ==
1. "Chapter 2: Organisation institutionnelle, administrative et judiciaire du Cameroun" (PDF). Annuaire Statistique du Cameroun (Report). Institut National de la Statistique. 2011. pp. 3–35. Archived (PDF) from the original on 19 September 2017.
2. BUCREP (2015). Population and housing census report (PDF) (Report). Central Bureau of the Census and Population Studies of Cameroon. Archived (PDF) from the original on 13 February 2019.
3. Chuyong, G; Kenfack, D; Harms, K; Thomas, W; Condit, R; Comita, L (2011). "Habitat specificity and diversity of tree species in an African wet tropical forest" (PDF). Plant Ecology. 212 (8): 1363–1374. doi:10.1007/s11258-011-9912-4. S2CID 39020878. Archived from the original (PDF) on 2019-02-18.
4. "United Councils and cities of Cameroon". CVUC-UCCC. 2014. Archived from the original on 13 February 2019.
5. Etongo, Daniel B; Glover, Edinam K (2012). "Participatory resource mapping for livelihood values derived from the forest in Ekondo-Titi subregion, Cameroon: A gender analysis". International Journal of Forestry Research. 2012 (ArticleID 971068): 9. doi:10.1155/2012/871068.
6. Lyonga, Ngoh M (2012). Reducing tropical deforestation and degradation: an evaluation of subsistence agro-forestry systems around Korup National Park, Cameroon (MSc thesis). U Buea, Cameroon.
7. Malleson, Ruth (2000). Forest livelihoods in southwest province, Cameroon: An evaluation of the Korup Experience (PhD thesis). Department of Anthropology, UCL.
8. Mukete, B; Sun, Y; Etongo, D; Sajjad, S; Abdul, M (2018b). "Assessing the drivers of land use change in the Rumpi hills forest protected area, Cameroon". Journal of Sustainable Forestry. 37 (6): 592–618. doi:10.1080/10549811.2018.1449121. S2CID 90942550.
9. Mukete, Beckline (2018d). A Study on Land Use and Land Cover Changes in the Rumpi Hills Forests of Cameroon (PhD thesis). Department of Forest Management, Beijing Forestry University, China.
10. Waterloo, M; Ntonga, J; Dolman, A; Ayangma, B (1997). "Impact of land use change on the hydrology and erosion of rain forest land in south Cameroon". Report (134). Wageningen, Netherlands: DLO Winand Staring Centre: 90. Archived from the original on 1 July 2018.
