= Mount Manengouba =

Volcano in Cameroon

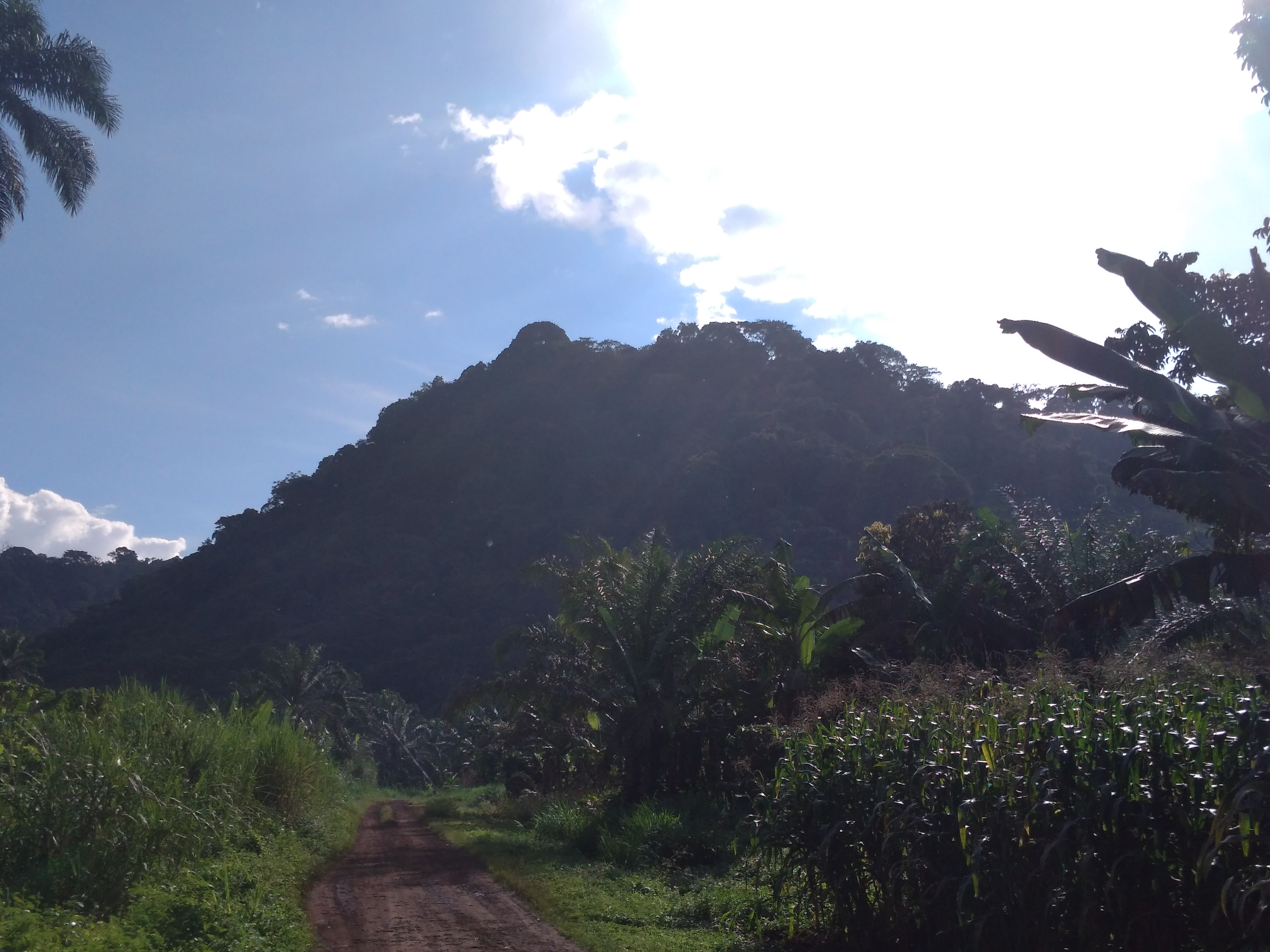

Highest point
- Elevation: 2,396 m (7,861 ft)
- Prominence: 1,433 m (4,701 ft)
- Listing: Ribu
- Coordinates: 5°01′48″N 9°49′48″E

Geography
- Location within Cameroon
- Location: Cameroon
- Parent range: Cameroon line

Geology
- Rock age: Pleistocene
- Mountain type(s): Shield volcano, stratovolcano

Mount Muanenguba (also spelled Manenguba or Mwanenguba) is a volcano in the Southwest Province of Cameroon. The Manenguba shrew and endemic vegetal species are native to the mountain. The area is featured in the documentary The Mists of Mwanenguba with botanist Martin Cheek.

== Geology ==
The volcano is a Pleistocene shield volcano. It is topped by the Eboga stratovolcano.

== Gallery ==
Mount Mwanenguba

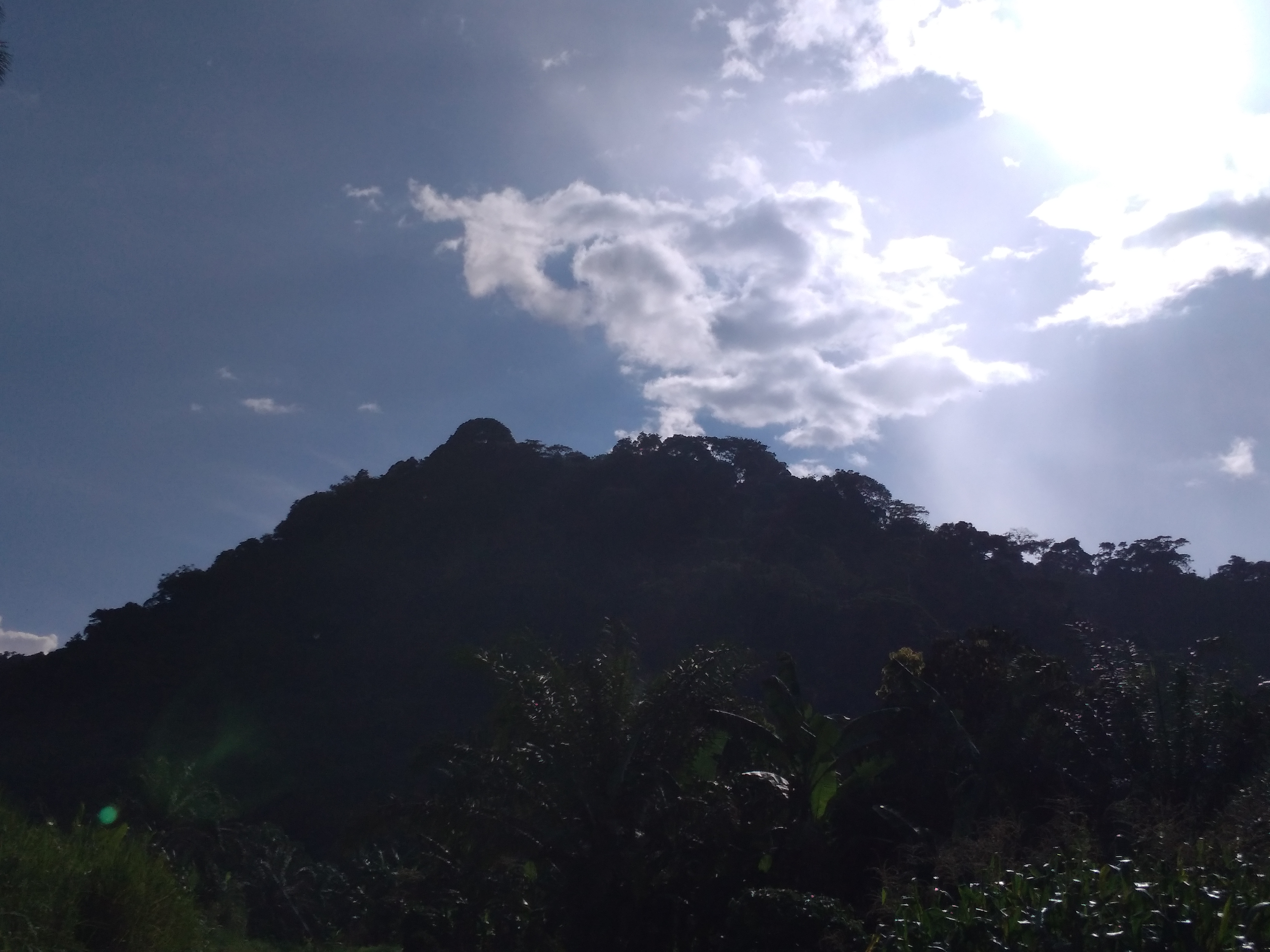

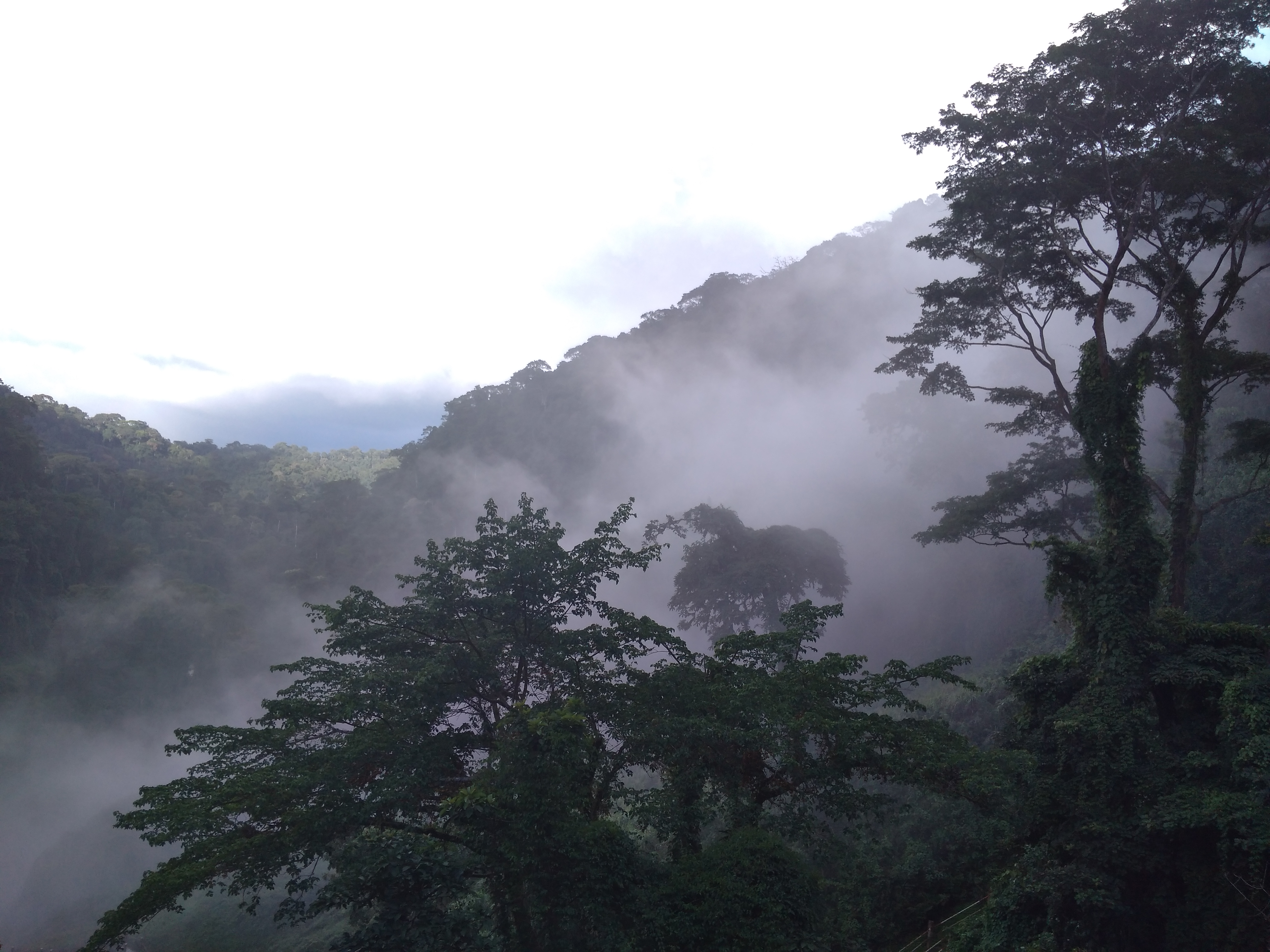

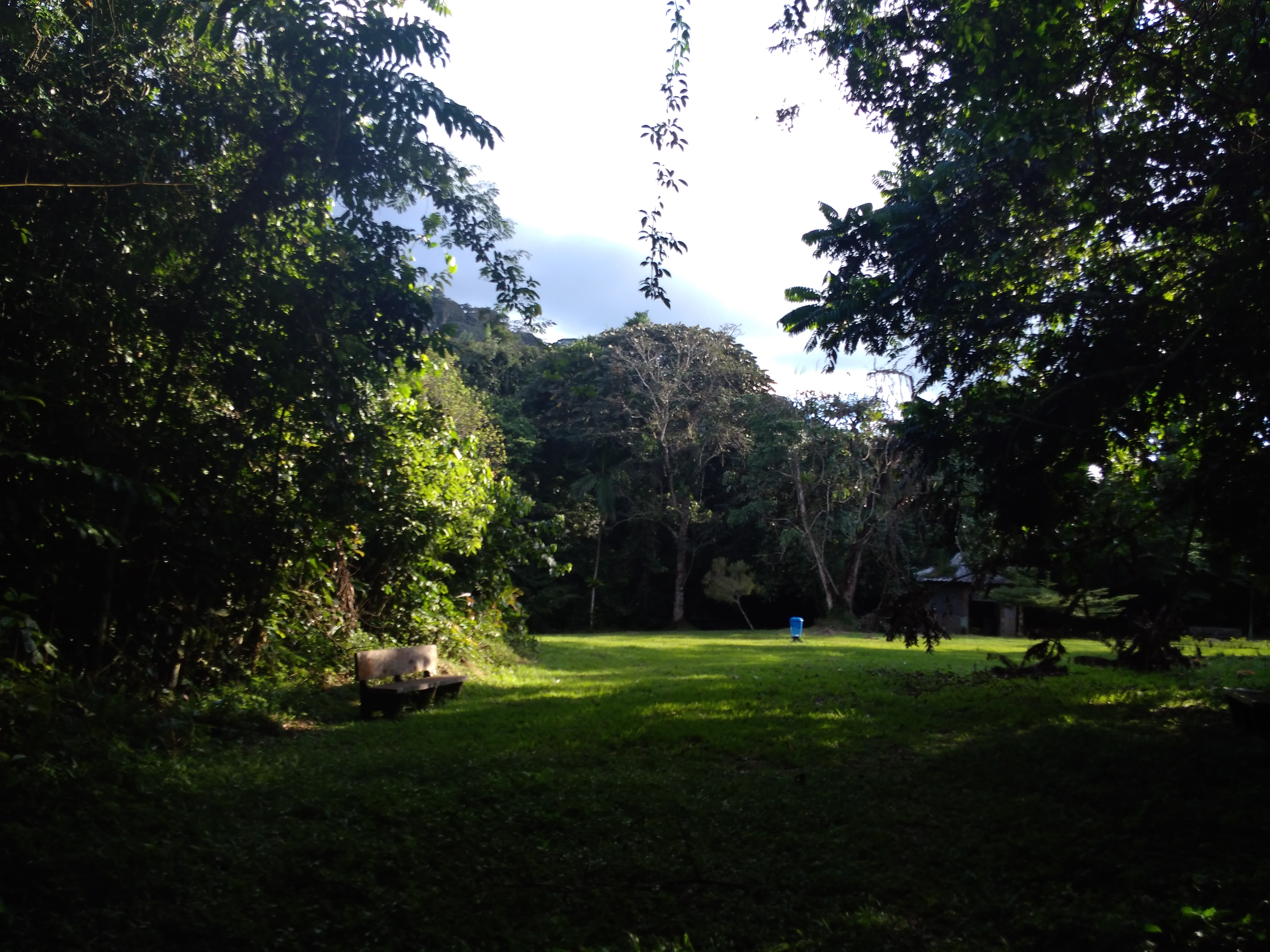

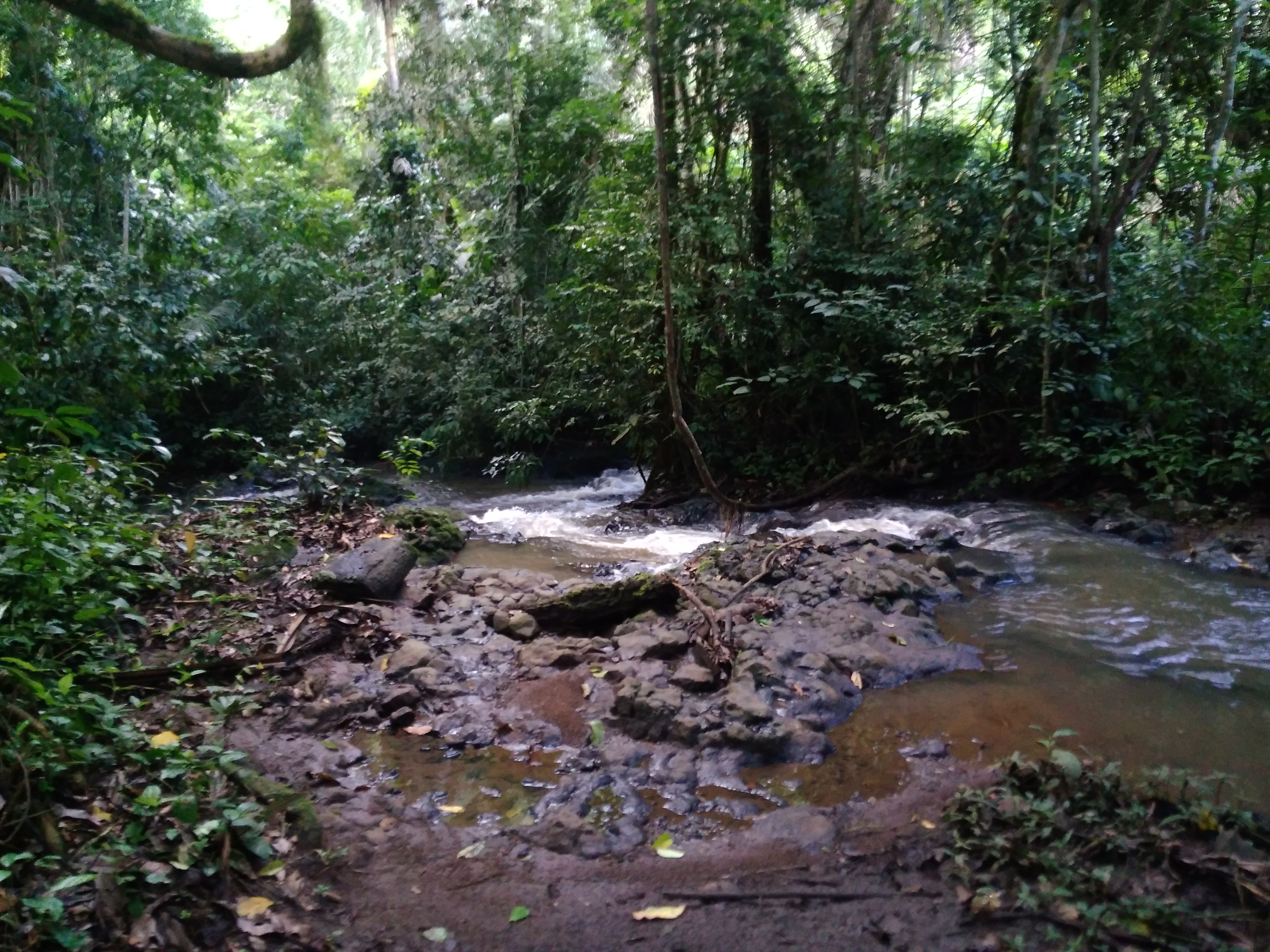

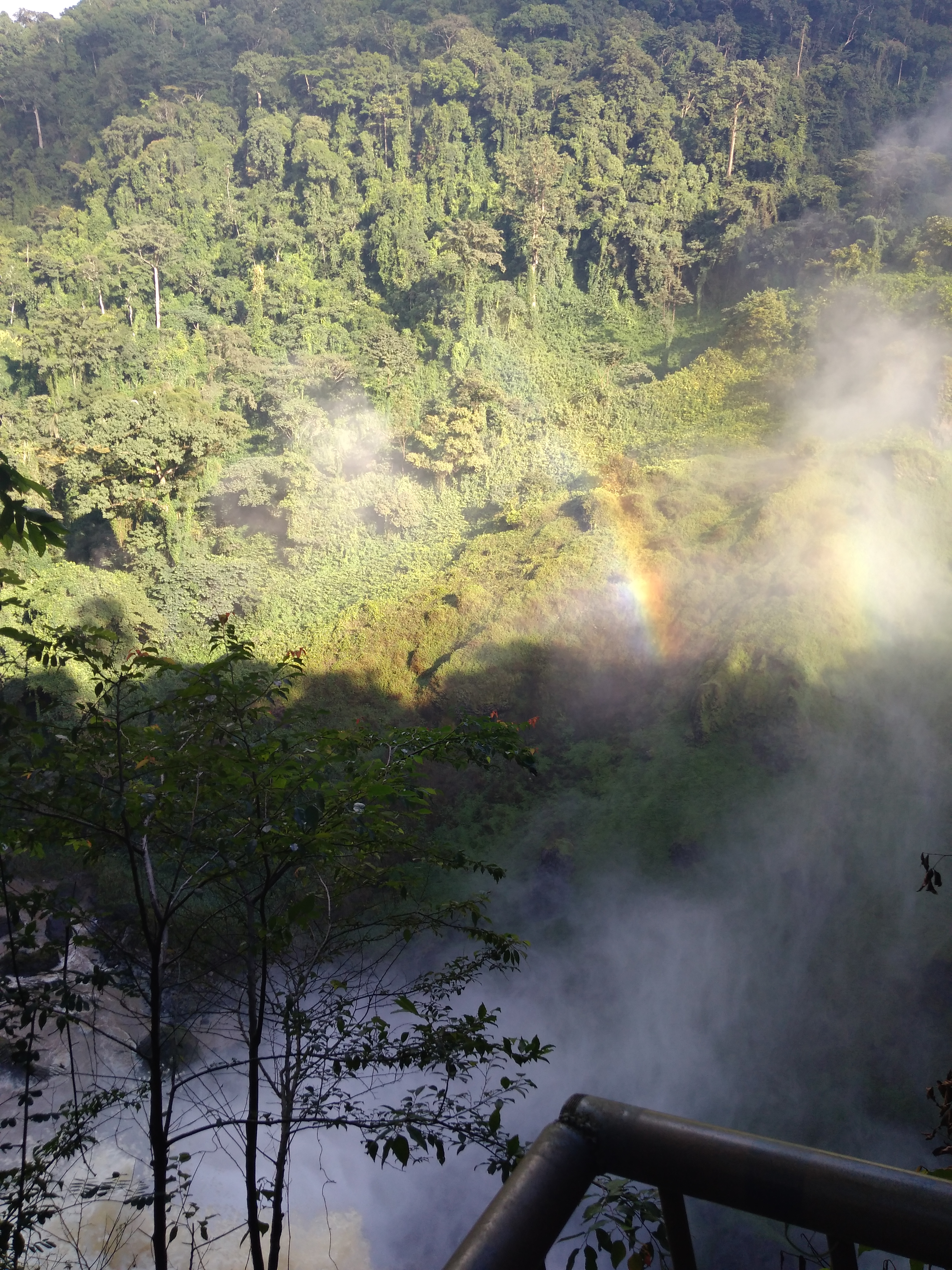

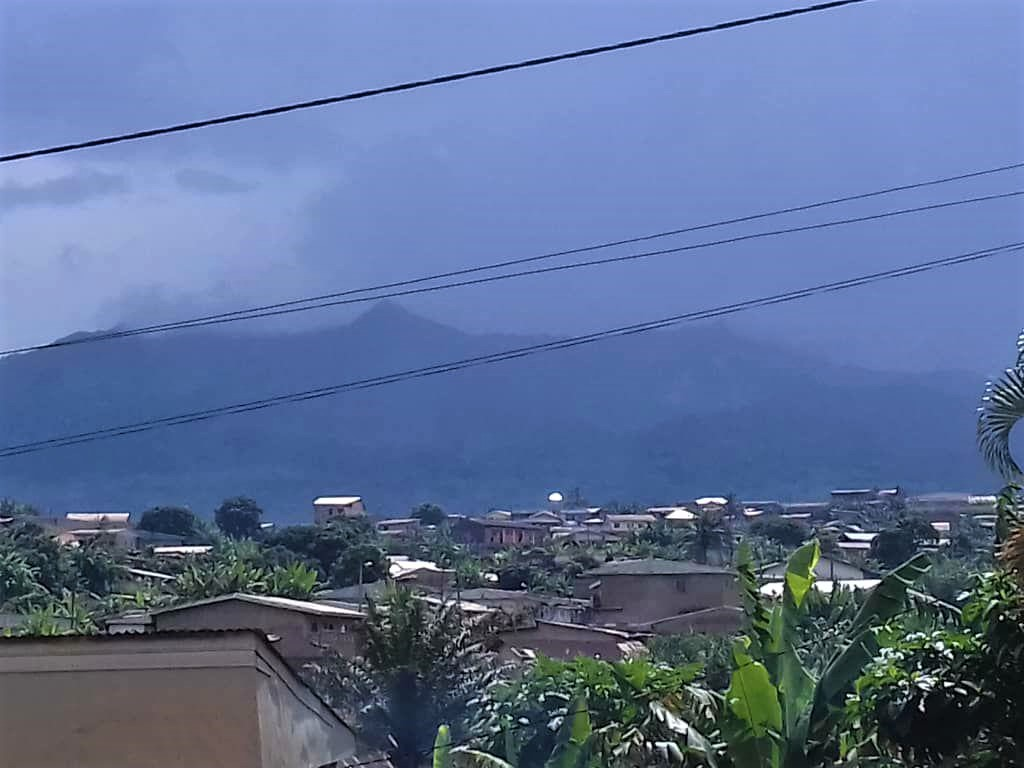
Mount Manengouba from Nkongsamba
