= Etoko, Cameroon =

Etuko
- Location within Cameroon
- Coordinates: 5.7090°N 9.5640°E
- Country: Cameroon
- Region: Southwest Region
- Department: Manyu
- Elevation: 764 m (2,507 ft)

Population (2005)
  - Total: 656

Etuko (or Etuku) is a village in Cameroon located in the Department of Manyu in the Southwest Region. It is administratively attached to the district of Upper Bayang (Tinto Council) and to the canton of Bachuo Akagbe. The village is located 43 kilometres (27 mi) from Mamfe and 105 km (65 mi) from Bamenda.

== Demographics ==
The locality had 414 inhabitants in 1953, then 578 in 1967. At that date it had a market, a cooperative (CPMS), a Catholic school founded in 1959. During the 2005 census, there were 656 people.

The local ethnicity is Banyangi people.

== See also ==
- Communes of Cameroon
