= Tinto, Cameroon =

Tinto Nyangi-Town
- District
- Location in Cameroon
- Coordinates: 5°32′43″N 9°35′22″E
- Country: Cameroon
- Region: South West
- Department: Manyu
- District: Upper Bayang

Area
  - Total: 470 sq mi (1,217 km^{2})

Population
  - Total: 2,046 (2,005)
  - Density: 4.4/sq mi (1.7/km^{2})
- Time zone: UTC+1 (WAT)
- Köppen climate type: Am : Tropical monsoon climate

Tinto is a locality of Cameroon located in the South-West Region and the Manyu . It is the district seat or district capital of the Upper Banyang(District) subdivision of Cameroon. Home to the Banyangi people. Along with UPPER BANYANG, the Tinto Council covers an area of 1217 km2.

== History ==
The commune of Tinto (Tinto Council) was created in 1995 by the breaking up of the Mamfé Commune. However, the etymology of the name comes from the eponymous founder Ta Ento. When Eugen von Zintgraff reached it in January 1889, he mispronounced it as Tinto. In 1892, the Germans opened trading post and in 1901, a military station was open under Lt. Karl Strumpell. The British wrestled Tinto from the Germans in January 1915. A year later, Tinto became a telegraphic hub and had a post office. In 1947, Tinto became a court area until it became the administrative seat of the Upper Banyang subdivision in 1993.

== Geography ==
The commune extends over an eastern part of the Manyu department, and borders eight Cameroonian communes: Mamfé, Widikum, Batibo, Wabane, Alou, Fontem, Nguti.

== People ==
At the 2005 census, Tinto Town had 2046 inhabitants. Tinto are Banyang of the Upper Banyang sub-group.

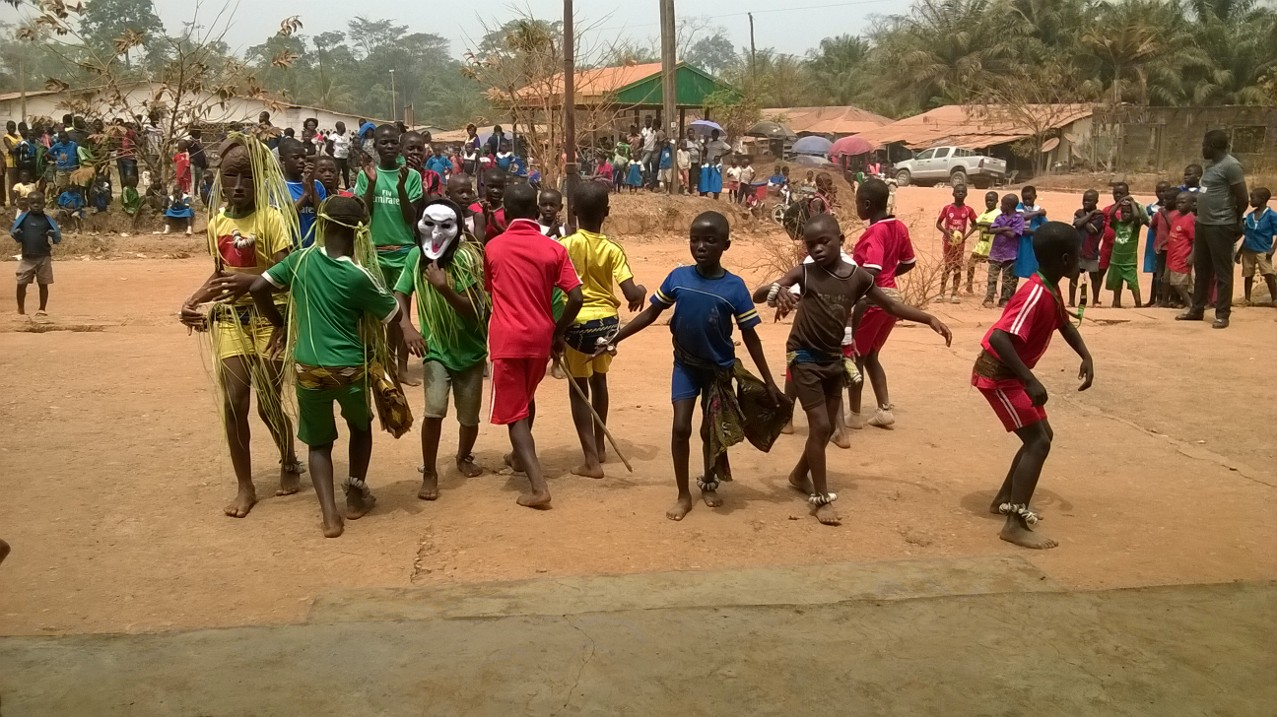
Tinto school children.
