= Manyu River =

River in Cameroon

Coordinates: 5.750932°N 9.344215°E

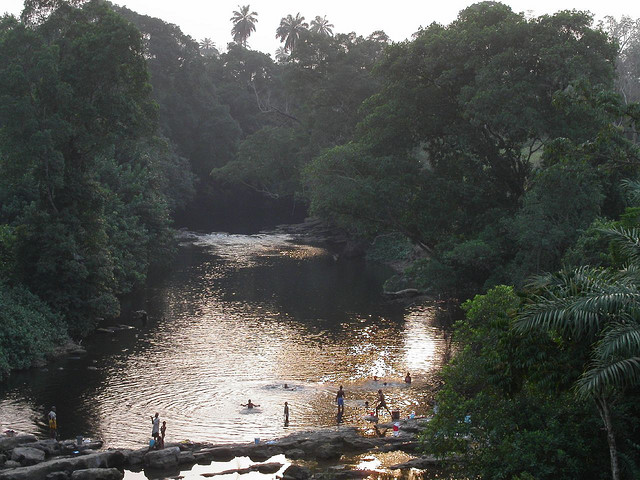
Manyu River

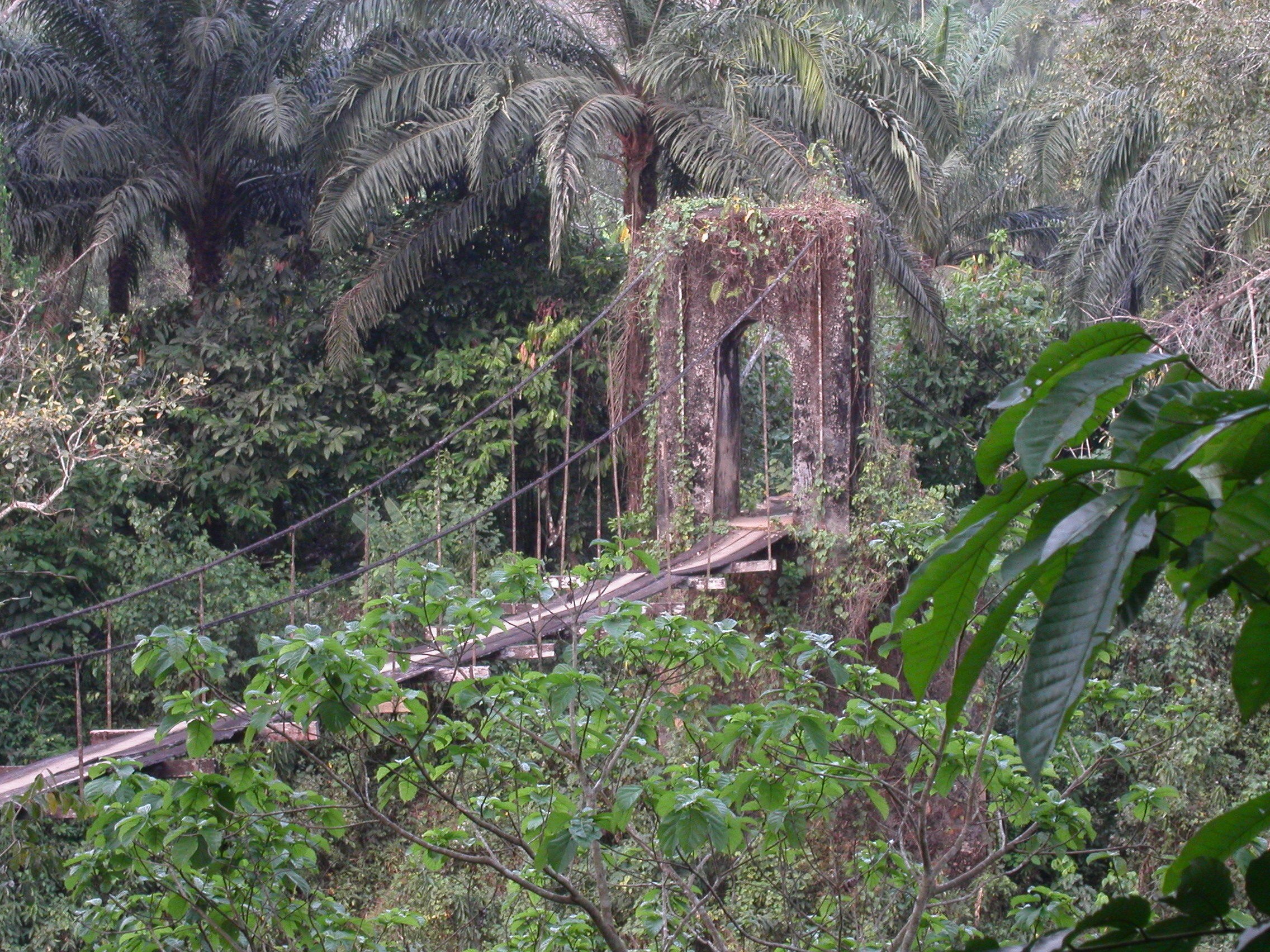
German Bridge (Cross River, Mamfe)

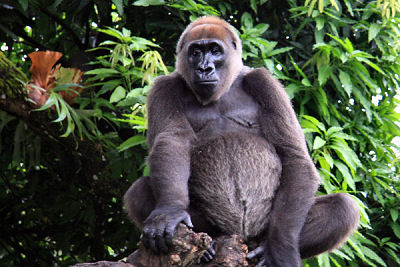
Cross River Gorilla, Limbe Wildlife Centre

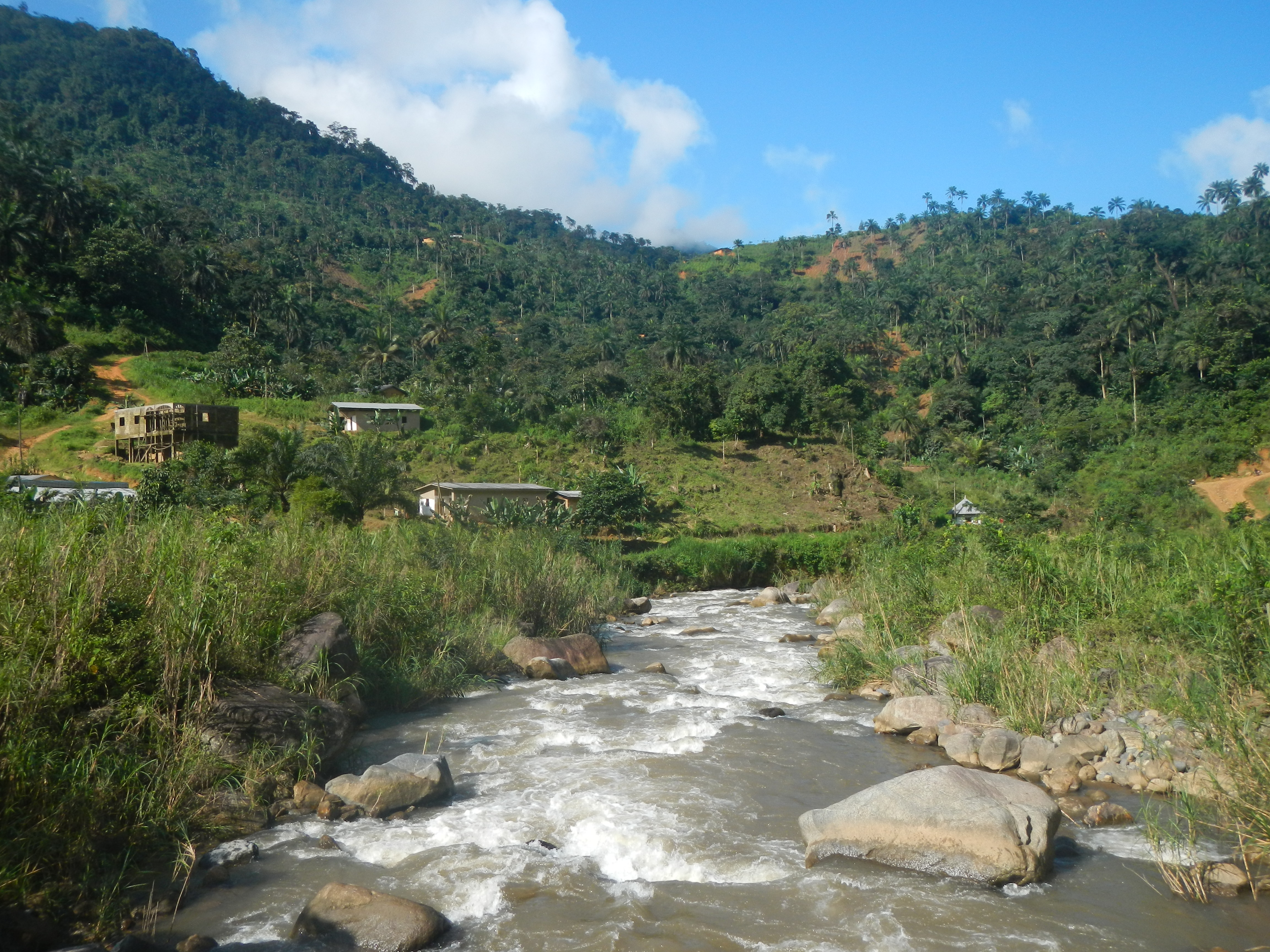
130915 Wabane

The Manyu River rises near Wabane in the Upper Banyang Subdivision of the Manyu Department of the Southwest Region, Cameroon. The river runs past the southern border of the Mone River Forest Reserve. Below Mamfe, it is joined by rivers draining the Takamanda Forest Reserve and the Cross River National Park in neighboring Nigeria. These protected areas are important habitats for the critically endangered Cross River gorilla. Around the Nigerian border the river takes the name of the Cross River.
