= Bachuo Akagbe =

Village in Cameroon

Coordinates: 5°41′23″N 9°26′18″E

Bachu Akagbe is a village in Cameroon located in the department of Manyu and the South West Region. It is part of Upper Bayang district. It is also a ward or chiefdom.

== People ==
In 1953, the locality had 426 inhabitants, then 992 in 1967, mainly Kenyang (Banyang) people.

== Education ==
Bachuo Akagbe has a public undergraduate technical establishment (CETIC).
