= Sumbe (Upper Bayang) =

Village in Cameroon

Coordinates: 5°29′28″N 9°33′13″E

Sumbe is a locality of Cameroon located in the South West Region and the department of Manyu. It is administratively attached to the district of Upper Bayang (Tinto Council) and the township of Tinto.

== People ==
In 1953, the village was still attached to Fotabe. In 1967, it had 847 inhabitants, Banyangi. At that time, it had a market every Saturday, a public school founded in 1947, a cooperative (CPMS), and a rural center for young people. During the reign of chief Ayukossok, there were only five(5) families that make up the sumbe village; families of: Tarh, Njie, Echere, Ewangache, Nchkachi, two other families evolved which are Ankou and Tanyi family. Bearing in mind that some group of people were small to form their own family and carry on their rights independently. These people were attached to the Tarh and Nchakachi. Chief Ayuk finally Made the families of NKai-ngoh and Kekiaye new independent families. Making the village to have Nine(9) families.

== Education ==
Sumbe has a government Primary school opened since 1948 and a public college opened in 2008.
