= Upper Bayang =

- District
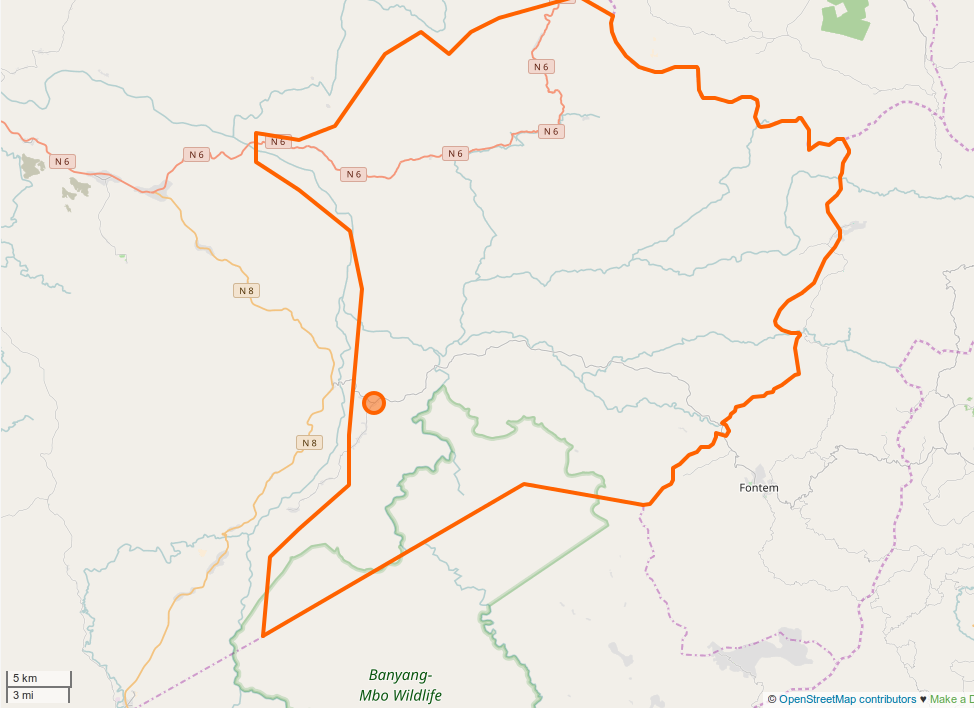
- Upper Bayang area
- Coordinates: 5°46′11″N 8°59′11″E
- Country: Cameroon
- Region: South West
- Department: Manyu
- District Capital: Tinto

Area
  - Total: 470 sq mi (1,217 km^{2})

Population
  - Total: 27,485
- Time zone: UTC+1 (WAT)

Upper Bayang (sometimes Banyang) is a district of Cameroon located in the Manyu department and the South West region. The district seat is located at Tinto (Tinto Council). Home to the Banyang people.

At the 2005 census, Upper Bayang had a population of 27,485.

== Administrative structure of the municipality ==
The borough includes the following localities:

- Adjeli
- Agong
- Akiriba
- Amebisu
- Ashum
- Atibong Wire
- Ayukaba Betieku
- Babat
- Bachuo Akagbe
- Batambé
- Bakebe
- Bakumba Batieku
- Bokwa
- Chinda
- Defang
- Ebangabi
- Ebeagwa
- Ebensuk
- Edjuingang
- Egbemoh
- Ekpor
- Etoko
- Etoko-Mbatop
- Eyang Atemako
- Fotabe
- Gurrifen
- Kekpoti
- Kendem
- Kenyang
- Kepelle
- Koano
- Mamboh
- Mantah I
- Mantah II
- Mbanga-Pongo
- Mbeme
- Mbinjong
- Mbio
- Mekwecha
- Moshie
- Nchemba I
- Nchemba II
- Nfainchang
- Nfaitock
- Ntenmbang
- Numba
- Obang 3 Corners
- Sabs
- Sumbe
- Tali I
- Tali II
- Tayor
- Tinto-Kerieh
