= Kendem language =

Southern Bantoid language spoken in Cameroon

Kendem
- Bokwa-Kendem
- Native to: Cameroon
- Native speakers: 1,500 (2001)
- Language family: Niger–Congo?: Atlantic–Congo; Benue–Congo; Southern; Mamfe; Kendem

Language codes
- ISO 639-3: kvm
- Glottolog: kend1252
- ELP: Kendem
- Kendem

Kendem, or Bokwa-Kendem, is a minor Southern Bantoid language of the Mamfe family. It is spoken in three villages in Cameroon, Kendem, Kekpoti and Bokwa.
