= Kenyang language =

Mamfe language of Cameroon

Kenyang
- Nyang
- Native to: Cameroon
- Native speakers: (65,000 cited 1992)
- Language family: Niger–Congo?: Atlantic–Congo; Volta-Congo; Benue–Congo; Bantoid; Southern Bantoid; Mamfe; Kenyang
- Dialects: Kitwii; Lower Kenyang; Upper Kenyang
- Writing system: Latin

Language codes
- ISO 639-3: ken
- Glottolog: keny1279
- Kenyang

Kenyang (Nyang, Banyang, Manyang) is the most spoken language of the Mamfe language group. It is spoken in the Manyu and Meme departments of the Southwest Region of Cameroon. Kenyang speakers in Cameroon are known as Bayangi (Bayangui) people and are called Bayangi (Bayangui).

There are three main dialects of Kenyang: Lower Kenyang, spoken in Eyumojock and Mamfe Central subdivisions, Upper Kenyang, spoken in Upper Bayang subdivision and Kitwii, spoken in Meme department. The Upper Kenyang and Lower Kenyang dialects are more closely related to each other than to Kitwii. Variant names of Kitwii include, Kicwe, Twii, Bakoni, Northern Balong, Upper Balong and Manyeman.

== Phonology and orthography ==
The phonemes of Kenyang are listed in the tables below, with their orthographic representation written in angled brackets:

=== Consonants ===
		Bilabial	Labiodental	Alveolar	Alveolo-palatal	Velar	Labiovelar
Nasal		m ⟨m⟩		n ⟨n⟩	ɲ ⟨ny⟩	ŋ ⟨ŋ⟩	
Plosive	Voiceless	p ⟨p⟩		t ⟨t⟩		k ⟨k⟩	k͡p ⟨kp⟩
Plosive	Voiced	b ⟨b⟩		d ⟨d⟩		ɡ ⟨g⟩	ɡ͡b ⟨gb⟩
Affricate	Voiceless				tʃ ⟨ch⟩		
Affricate	Voiced				dʒ ⟨j⟩		
Fricative	Voiceless		f ⟨f⟩	s ⟨s⟩			
Fricative	Voiced	β ⟨bh⟩				ɣ ⟨gh⟩	
Trill				r ⟨r⟩			
Approximant					j ⟨y⟩		w ⟨w⟩

The voiceless stops /p t k/ are realized as unreleased word-finally: [sə̀p̚] ('to descend'), [tə̀t̚] ('to wipe') and [kɔ̀k̚] ('to grind'). Before front vowels, /t/ and /d/ are in free variation between being dental and interdental: [t̪í] ('to sell') and [ǹd̪ɛ́] ('coat'). Elsewhere /t/ and /d/ are alveolar. /m/ is realized as labiodental [ɱ] before /f/: [ɱ̀fó̰ŋ] ('buffalo').

=== Vowels ===
	Front	Central	Back	
	Front	Central	Unrounded	Rounded
Close	i ⟨i⟩	ɨ ⟨ɨ⟩	ɯ ⟨ʉ⟩	u ⟨u⟩
Close-mid	e ⟨e⟩			o ⟨o⟩
Open-mid	ɛ ⟨ɛ⟩			ɔ ⟨ɔ⟩
Open		a ⟨a⟩		

All vowels in Kenyang become nasalized when following a nasal consonant, or when preceding a nasal consonant. For example, [ŋá̰] ('to chew'). /ɛ/ is realized as a close-mid central vowel in closed syllables: [tə̀t̚] ('to wipe').
