= Denya language =

Bantoid language spoken in Cameroon

Denyang
- Anyah
- Native to: Cameroon
- Ethnicity: Anyang
- Native speakers: (11,200 cited 1982)
- Language family: Niger–Congo?: Atlantic–Congo; Benue–Congo; Southern Bantoid; Mamfe; Denyang
- Dialects: Anyang; Betieku; Awanchi; Bantah

Language codes
- ISO 639-3: anv
- Glottolog: deny1238
- ELP: Denya
- Denya

Denyang is a Southern Bantoid language of Cameroon Manyu languages (of the Anyang tribe). It is spoken by five main clans: Ayang, Baku, Betieku, Bantah, Awanchi, they are divergent enough to perhaps be considered separate languages.
