= Mamfe languages =

Language family

Mamfe
- Nyang
- Geographic distribution: Southwest Cameroon
- Linguistic classification: Niger–Congo?: Atlantic–Congo; Volta-Congo; Benue–Congo; Bantoid; Southern Bantoid; Mamfe

Language codes
- ISO 639-3: –
- Glottolog: mamf1238
- The Mamfe languages shown within Cameroon: Denya Kendem Kenyang

The Mamfe or Nyang languages are three languages that form a branch of Southern Bantoid languages spoken in southwest Cameroon. They are:

Denya, Kendem and Kenyang (Nyang).

They are clearly related to each other, though they are not close.
