= Mamfe =

City in the Southwest Region of Cameroon

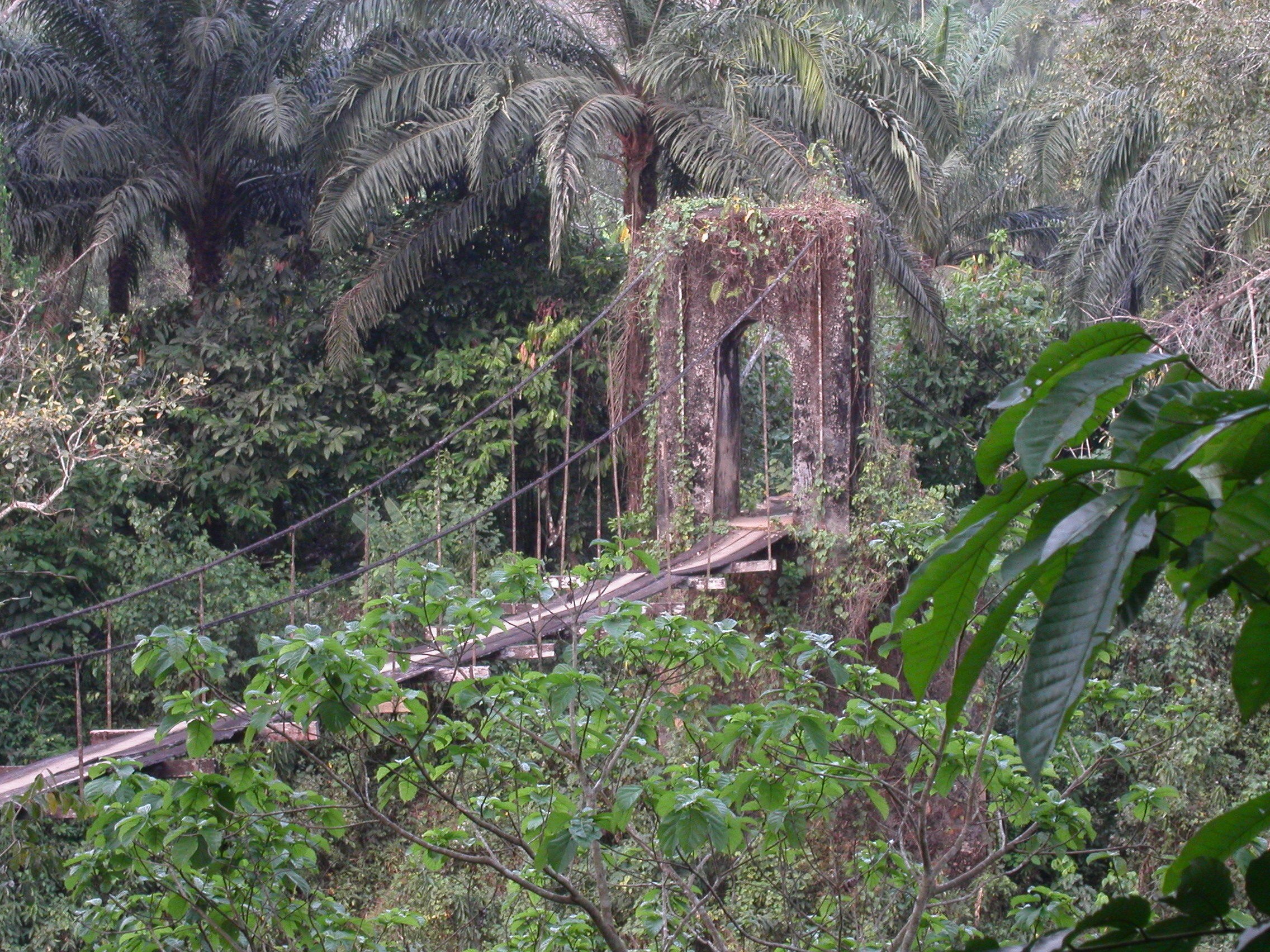
- German colonial era bridge over the Cross/Manyu River near Mamfe

- Location in Cameroon
- Coordinates: 5°46′N 9°17′E
- Country: Cameroon
- Province: Southwest
- Divisions: Manyu

Mamfe or Mamfé is a city in and the capital of Manyu, a division of the Southwest Region in Cameroon. It is 74 km (46 mi) from the border of Nigeria, on the Manyu River. It has a population of 42,500 (2024 estimates).

It is known as a centre for traditional religion (e.g., Obasinjom and Ekpe Society) and traditional medicine. Mamfe used to be known for bad infrastructure within the city limits, especially the roads, but in recent times the roads have been tarred and are currently in good condition. The roads leading in and out of the city have also been tarred e.g., Mamfe - Bamenda, Mamfe - Kumba, Mamfe - Ekok.

The Peace Corps has maintained a presence in the Mamfe area since they entered the country in 1962.

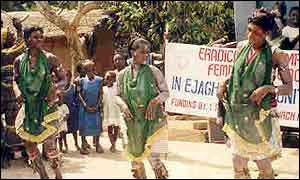
Cultural display in mamfe

Since 2017, Mamfe has been a frequent battleground in the Anglophone Crisis. The city saw heavy fighting in December 2017, when the Cameroonian Army battled the Ambazonia Defence Forces for control over Mamfe and the surroundings. In May 2020, separatist fighters assassinated the newly elected mayor, Ashu Priestly Ojong. As of January 2023, suspected separatist fighters stormed Mamfe and set a Total petrol station on fire.

== Etymology ==
The name "Mamfe" comes from the [Bayangi language]. When Germans first arrived in the area via the Cross River, the Germans greeted a local man at the Egbekaw River site who was carrying sand from the shore and tried interrogating him about where they were. The Banyang man didn't understand and only said in his dialect, "Mamfie fah?" ("Where should I put it?"). The Germans heard this as "Mamfe" and named the area so.

== Demographics ==
The Egbekaw village is the native/pioneer of Mamfe town. The inhabitants speak a Bayang language as their mother tongue, called Nyang, although English is the official language spoken along with Pidgin and several other dialects, including Ejagham. The city is also noteworthy for the high proportion of Nigerians who live there.

== Education ==
Mamfe has no university yet, but the Catholic university is now under construction. The Mamfe Girls College was Cameroon's first all-female boarding school. There is also a teachers' training college, and several vocational schools.

== Cuisine ==
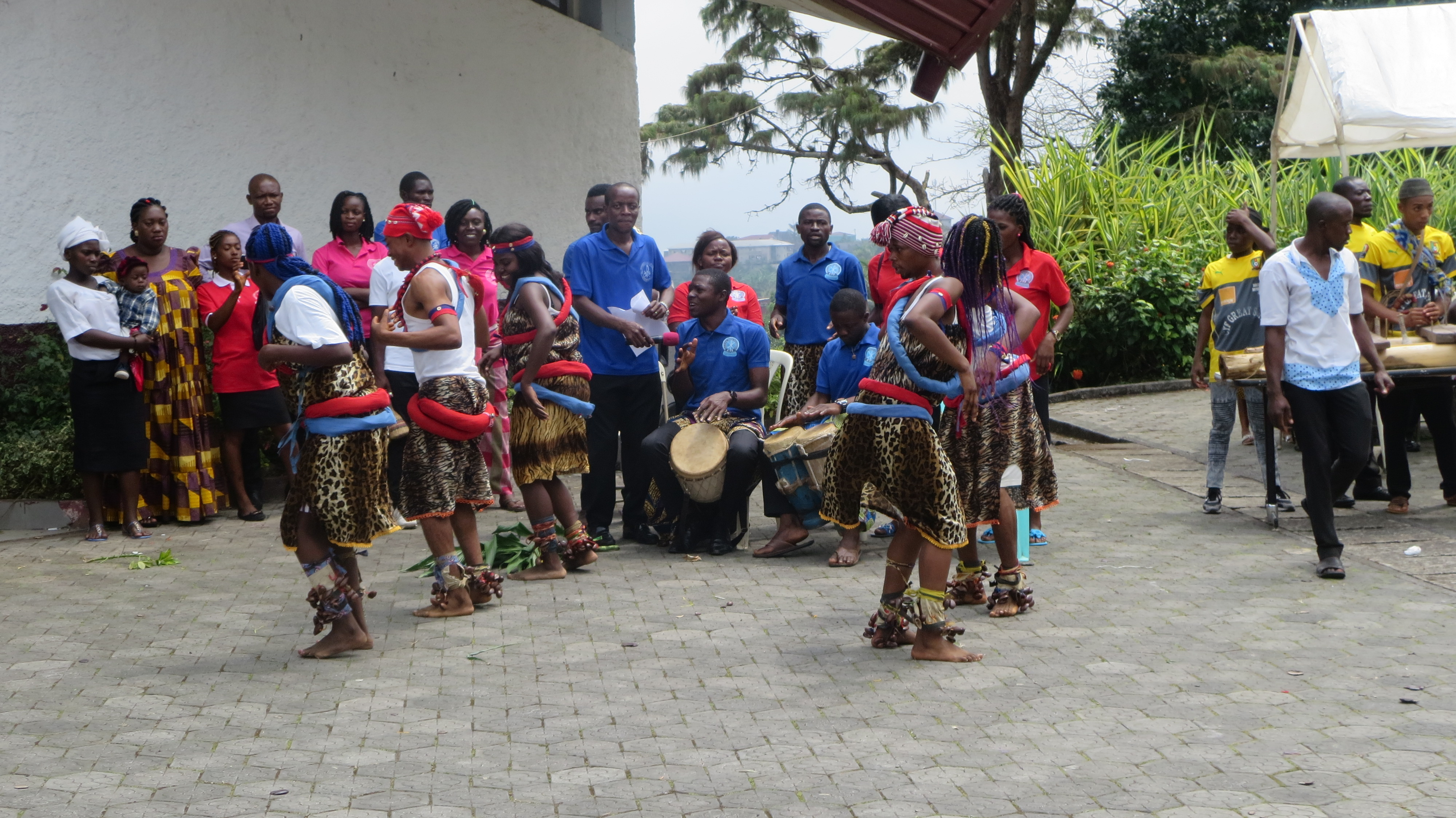
Bayangi from Cameroon

Popular local foods in Mamfe include eru and fu-fu, fu-fu and ogbono soup, koki and plantains.

== Climate ==
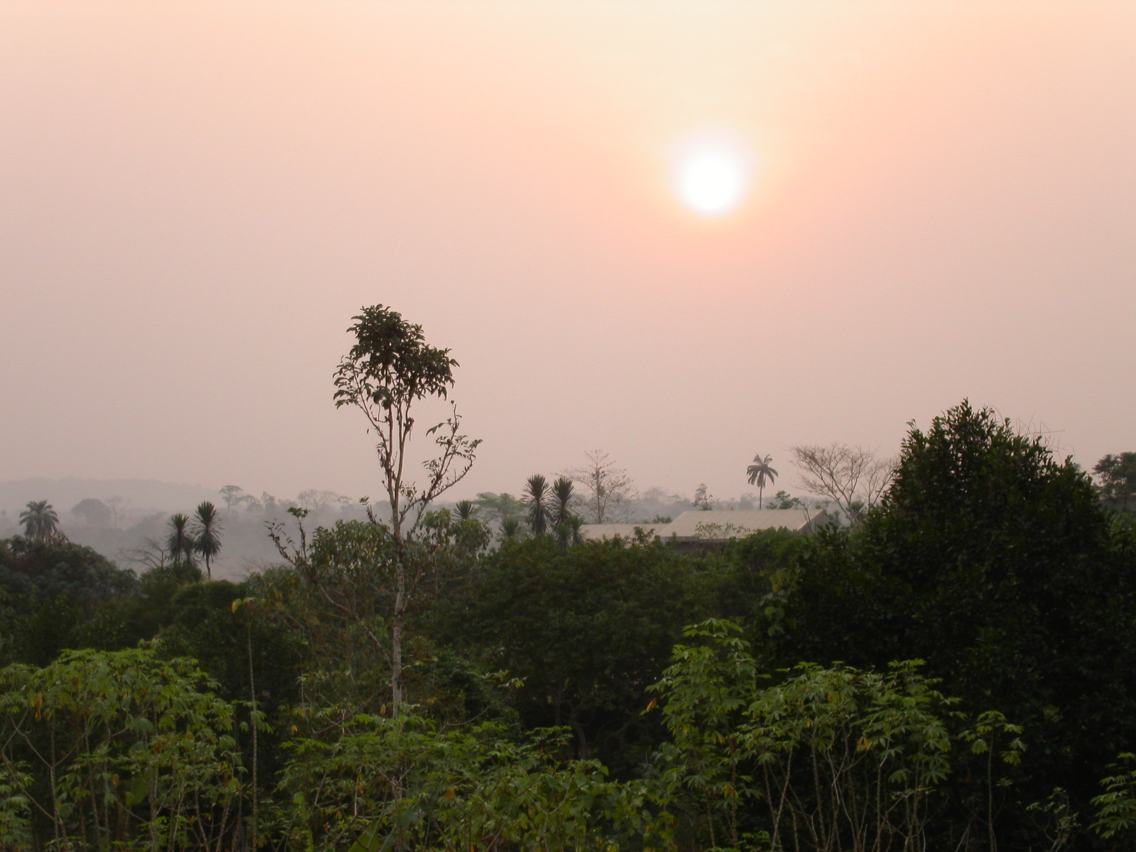
Afternoon sun in Mamfe, Cameroon

Mamfe has a tropical monsoon climate (Köppen climate classification Am). As Mamfe is in a river valley, humidity can be over 90% and temperatures can exceed 120 F (49 °C) during the Dry Season (February - April). During the rest of the year, temperatures remain in the 80-90s (27 to 37 °C) and only fall during the Rainy Season, sometimes to 70F (21 °C).

The climate can be very uncomfortable for travellers, but tourism is beginning in the area, though small. Points of interest are the old German bridge, the Mamfe Cross, the Mamfe River by boat, and the Mamfe Cathedral. Hotels are few, but can and do accommodate western travellers.

Climate data for Mamfe
Month	Jan	Feb	Mar	Apr	May	Jun	Jul	Aug	Sep	Oct	Nov	Dec	Year
Mean daily maximum °C (°F)	31.4 (88.5)	33.5 (92.3)	33.3 (91.9)	32.9 (91.2)	32.1 (89.8)	30.8 (87.4)	29.0 (84.2)	28.7 (83.7)	30.1 (86.2)	30.9 (87.6)	31.4 (88.5)	31.1 (88.0)	31.3 (88.3)
Daily mean °C (°F)	25.6 (78.1)	27.2 (81.0)	27.9 (82.2)	27.8 (82.0)	27.3 (81.1)	26.5 (79.7)	25.6 (78.1)	25.4 (77.7)	25.9 (78.6)	26.5 (79.7)	26.4 (79.5)	25.8 (78.4)	26.5 (79.7)
Mean daily minimum °C (°F)	19.9 (67.8)	21.0 (69.8)	22.2 (72.0)	22.5 (72.5)	22.5 (72.5)	22.2 (72.0)	22.0 (71.6)	21.9 (71.4)	21.8 (71.2)	21.9 (71.4)	21.6 (70.9)	20.3 (68.5)	21.6 (70.9)
Average precipitation mm (inches)	17.8 (0.70)	57.0 (2.24)	157.1 (6.19)	224.3 (8.83)	272.0 (10.71)	372.8 (14.68)	479.2 (18.87)	465.1 (18.31)	488.9 (19.25)	415.8 (16.37)	93.4 (3.68)	28.6 (1.13)	3,072 (120.94)
Average precipitation days (≥ 1.0 mm)	2	4	11	17	20	24	25	27	26	24	8	2	190
Mean monthly sunshine hours	181.9	173.6	167.5	166.7	167.7	131.0	87.2	72.8	101.3	135.3	171.9	187.9	1,744.8
Source: NOAA

== Notable people ==
- George Elokobi (b. 1986), professional footballer
- Late Chief Solomon Ashu Arrey of Ossing (1905-2005)
- Senator Mfaw Tabetando Ndiepnso
- Matilda Nkwo, First Miss Cameroon, 1977, Miss Commonwealth Nigeria, 1988
- Honorable Enow Tanjong (first governor of the region post colonization and Former member of parliament representing the Manyu people, Built the first church n the area.)
