= Manyu (department) =

- Division
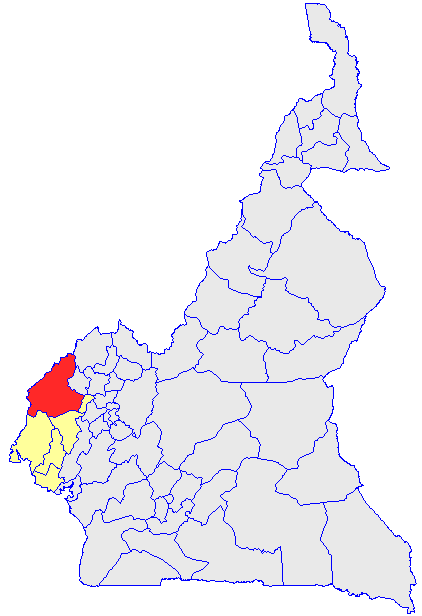
- Division location in Cameroon
- Coordinates: 5.7667°N 9.2833°E
- Country: Cameroon
- Region: Southwest Region
- Capital: Mamfe

Area
  - Total: 9,565 km^{2} (3,693 sq mi)

Population (2005)
  - Total: 181,039
  - Density: 18.93/km^{2} (49.02/sq mi)
- Time zone: UTC+1 (WAT)

Manyu is a division of the Southwest Region in Cameroon. The division covers an area of 9,565 km^{2} and as of 2005 had a total population of 181,039. The capital of the division is Mamfe.

== Sub-divisions ==
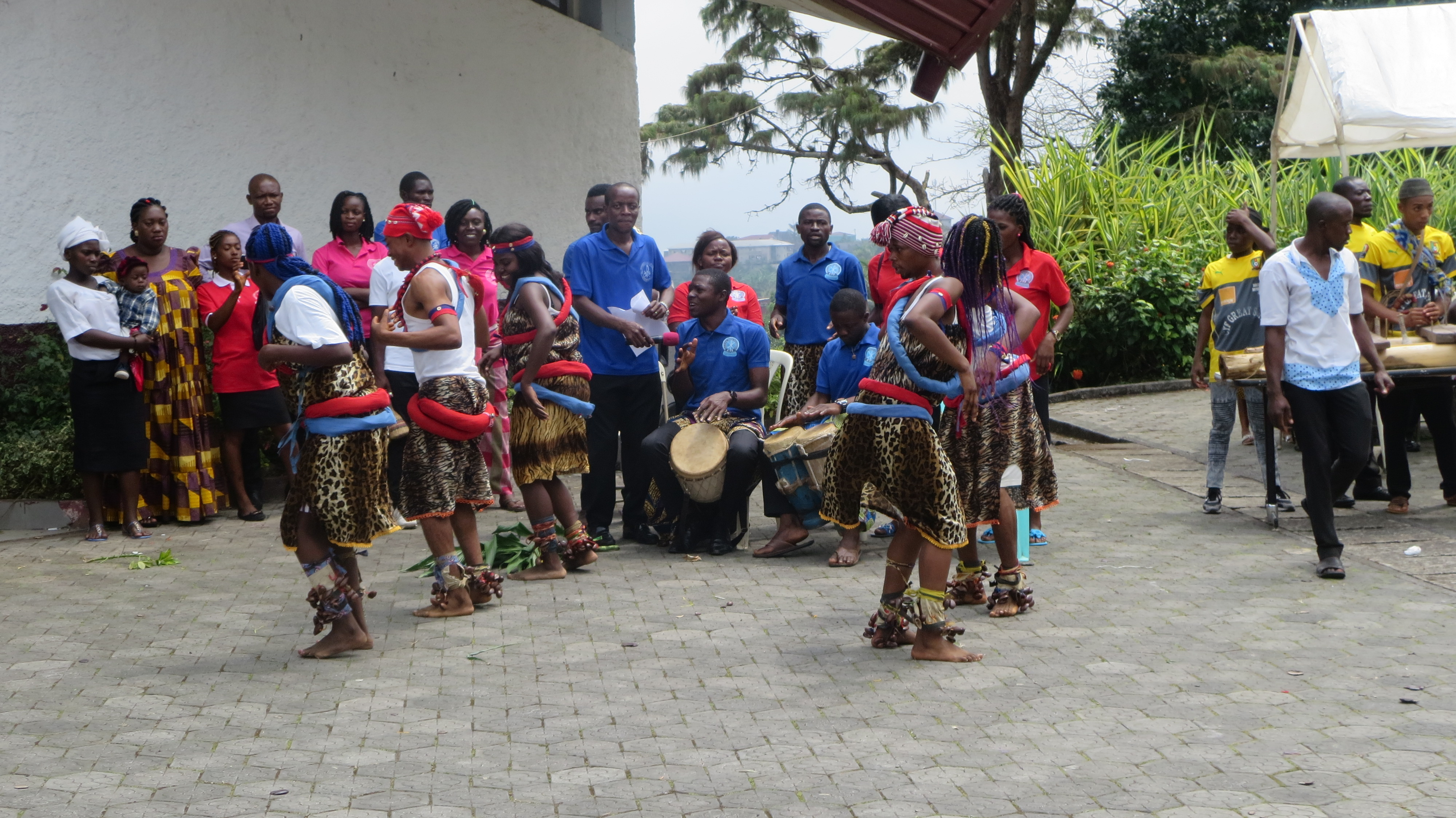
Bayangi from Cameroon

The division is divided administratively into 4 sub-divisions and in every sud-division there are villages or wards.

District	Capital	Area (km^{2})
Akwaya	Akwaya	3,682
Eyumojock	Eyumojock	1,373
Upper Bayang	Tinto	1,217
Mamfe Central	Mamfe Town	3,199
