= Southwest Region (Cameroon) =

Region of Cameroon

Coordinates: 4°10′N 9°14′E

- Region of Cameroon with special status
- Seal

- Location of Southwest Region within Cameroon
- Country: Cameroon
- Capital: Buea
- Divisions: Fako, Koupé-Manengouba, Lebialem, Manyu, Meme, Ndian

Government
  - Governor: Bernard Okalia B.
  - President of the Regional Assembly & Executive Council: Zacheus Bakoma

Area
  - Total: 25,410 km^{2} (9,810 sq mi)

Population (2015)
  - Total: 1,553,320
  - Density: 61.13/km^{2} (158.3/sq mi)
- HDI (2022): 0.676 medium · 2nd of 10

The Southwest Region or South-West Region (French: Région du Sud-Ouest) is a region with special status in Cameroon. Its capital is Buea. As of 2015, its population was 1,553,320. Along with the Northwest Region, it is one of the two Anglophone (English-speaking) regions of Cameroon. Various Ambazonian nationalist and separatist factions regard the South-West region as being distinct as a polity from Cameroon.

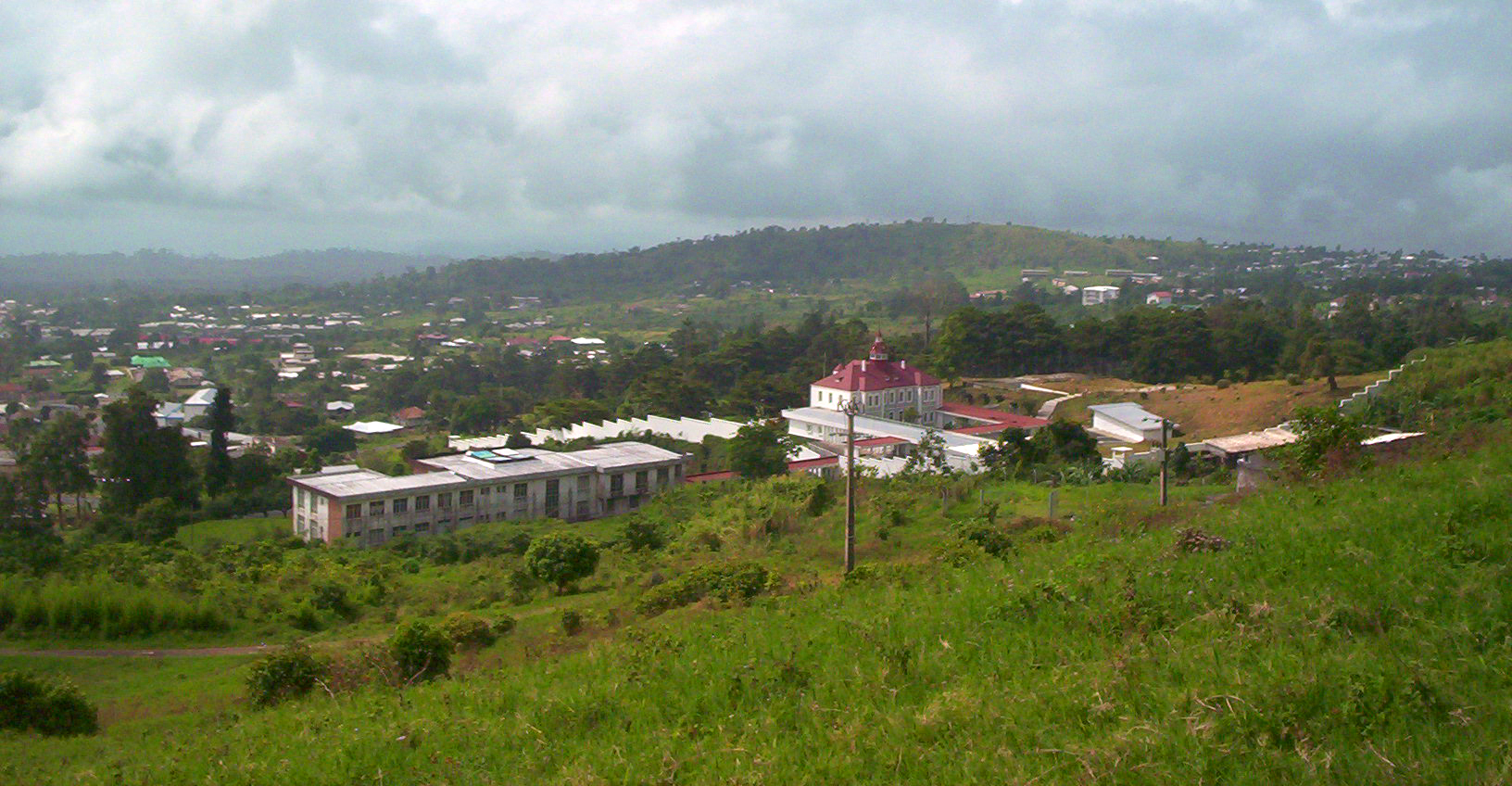
The capital Buea from the foot of Mount Cameroon

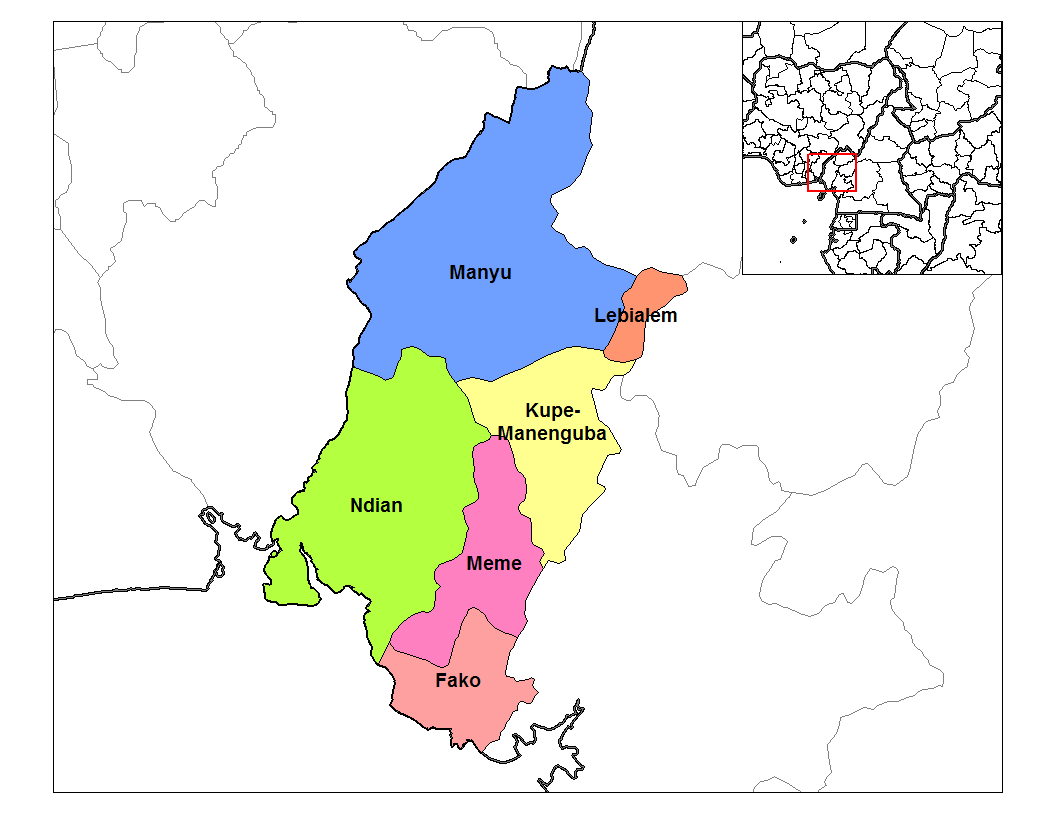
Divisions of Southwest province

== History ==
In 1884, the region was colonized by Germany under the Protectorate regime until 1916 when it became a condominium administered jointly by the United Kingdom and France. In 1919, the administration of the South West region became solely British. In 1961, the region joined Cameroon as part of the federated state of West Cameroon.

At the end of 2017, an Ambazonian separatist movement in the two English-speaking regions of the North-West and South-West initiated a wave of violence affecting the military, police, business leaders and workers. The separatist militiamen are trying in particular to prevent children from returning to school. Between 2016 and 2019, separatists reportedly ransacked, destroyed or burned more than 174 schools Separatists from the Ambazonia administration regard both the Northwest and Southwest regions as being constituent components of their envisaged breakaway state.

== Administration ==
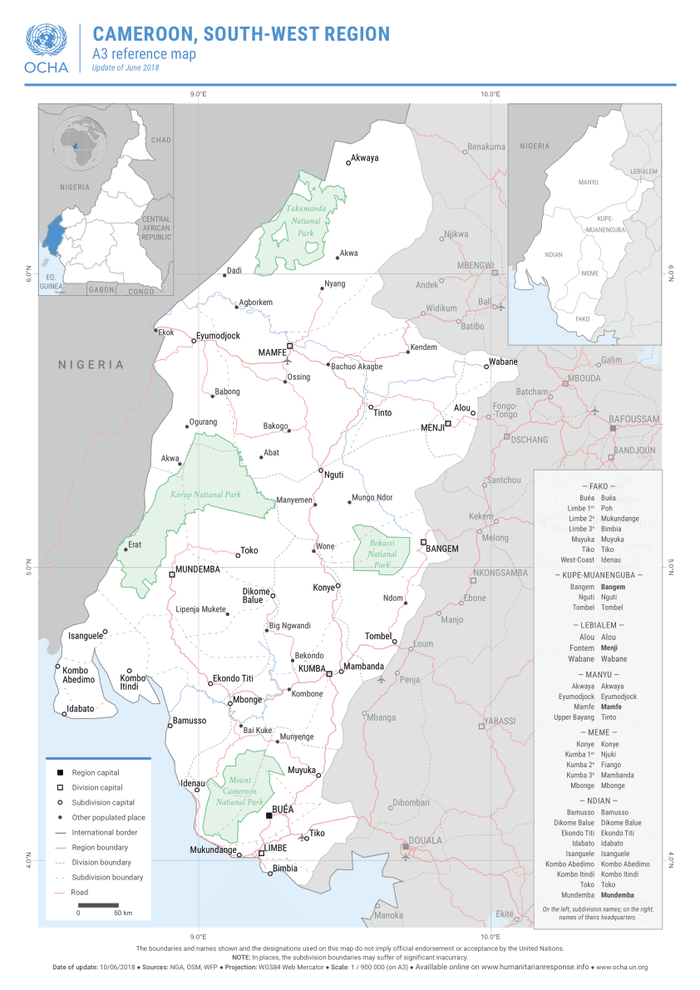
Map of Southwest

The region is divided into six divisions or departments: Fako, Koupé-Manengouba, Lebialem, Manyu, Meme and Ndian. These are in turn broken down into subdivisions. Presidentially appointed senior divisional officers (prefets) and subdivisional officers (sous-prefets) govern each respectively.

=== Special status ===
As part of the Major National Dialogue, the region was given a "special status" in December 2019, granting additional rights and responsibilities in relation to economic, health, social, educational, sports and cultural development. Under the special status the region has a bicameral Regional Assembly, made up of a 20-member House of Chiefs composed of traditional leaders and a 70-member House of Divisional Representatives nominated by municipal councils. The Regional Assembly appoints a Regional Executive Council. Additional powers over health and education were also granted to municipalities.

==== Regional Executive Council ====
The Regional Executive Council is led by the President of the Regional Assembly and includes a vice president, three commissioners, two secretaries and a questor. The first committee, elected in December 2020, was as follows:

Name	Portfolios
Bakoma Elango Zacheus	President of the Regional Assembly; President of the House of Divisional Representatives; President of the Regional Executive Council
Atem Ebako	Vice-President of the Regional Assembly; President of the House Chiefs; Vice-President of the Regional Executive Council
Mokoko Simon Gobina	Commissioner for Economic Development
Itoe Williams Elangwe	Commissioner for Security and Social Development
Taking Walters Ayuk	Commissioner for Education, Sports and Cultural Development
Limunga Becky Effoe	Secretary
Chief Foto Felix	Secretary
Tazie Andrew	Questor

== Geography ==
The region was notable for having the first English-speaking university in Cameroon (the University of Buea). Towns include the capital Buea, Limbe, Tiko, Ekondo , Mundemba, Kumba and Mamfe. Limbe in particular is a popular tourist resort notable for its fine beaches. Korup National Park situated in the Ndian Division is also a major attraction. Buea itself, meanwhile, sits at the foot of Mount Cameroon, and possesses an almost temperate climate markedly different from the rest of the province.

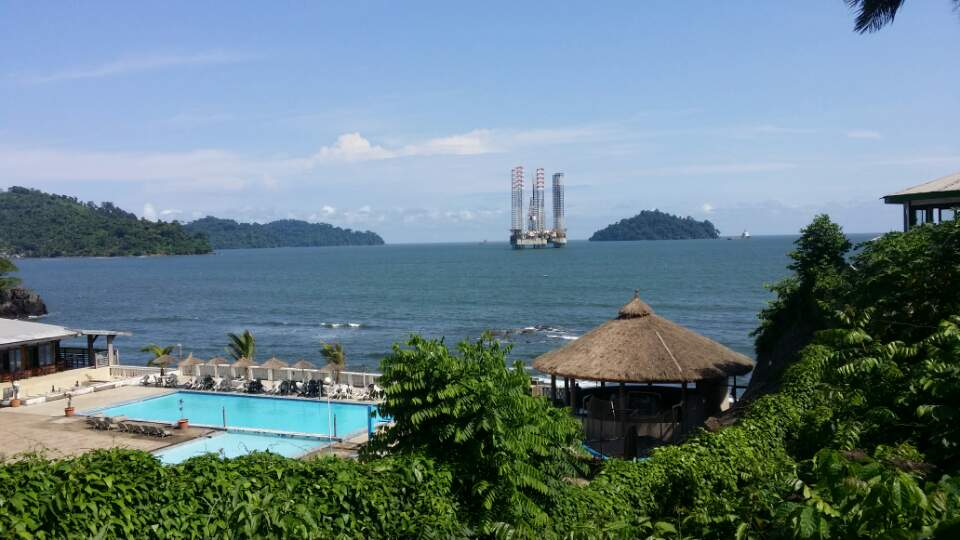
Thatched roof structures at the Limbe Beach

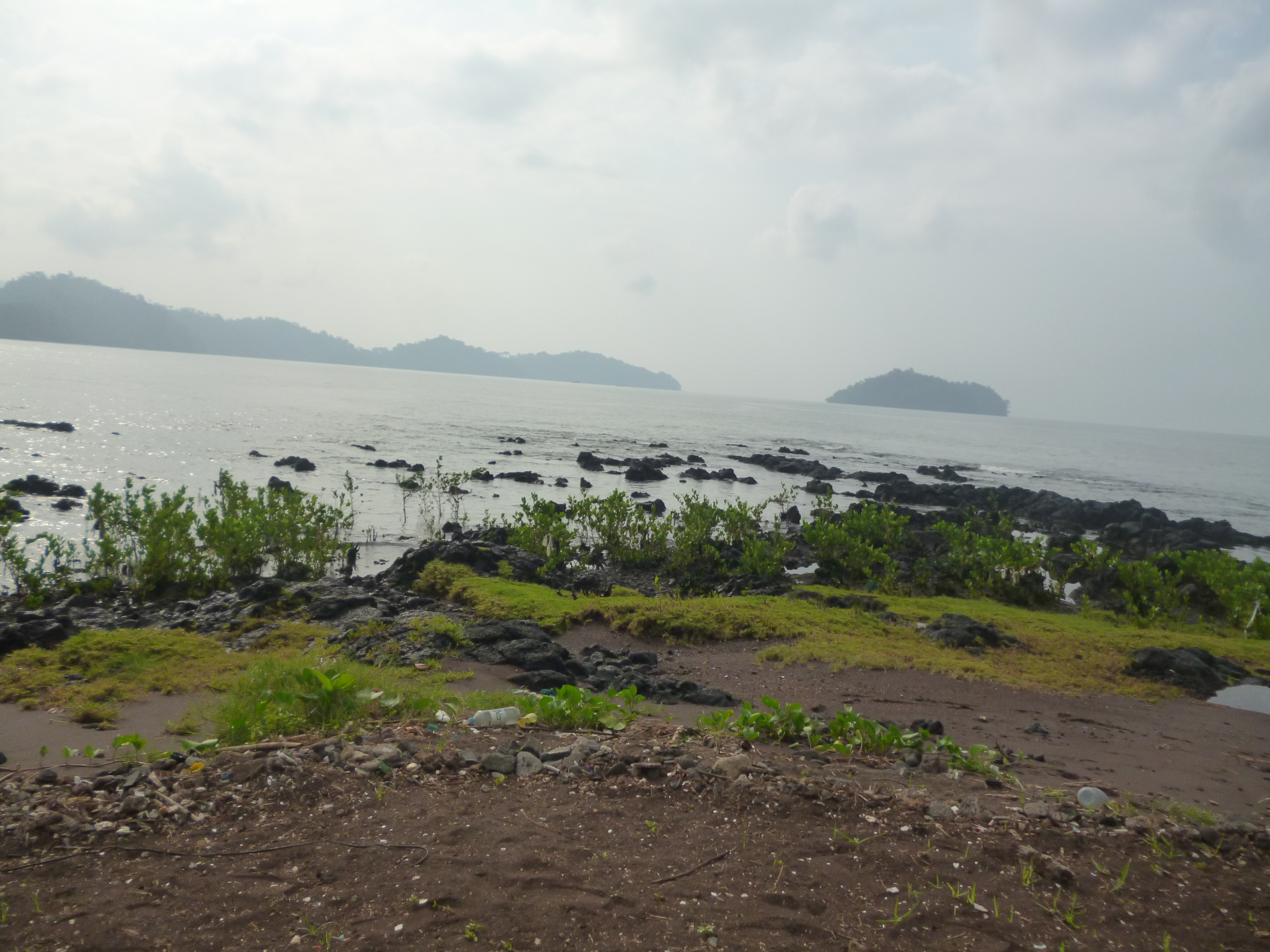
View of Bota Beach

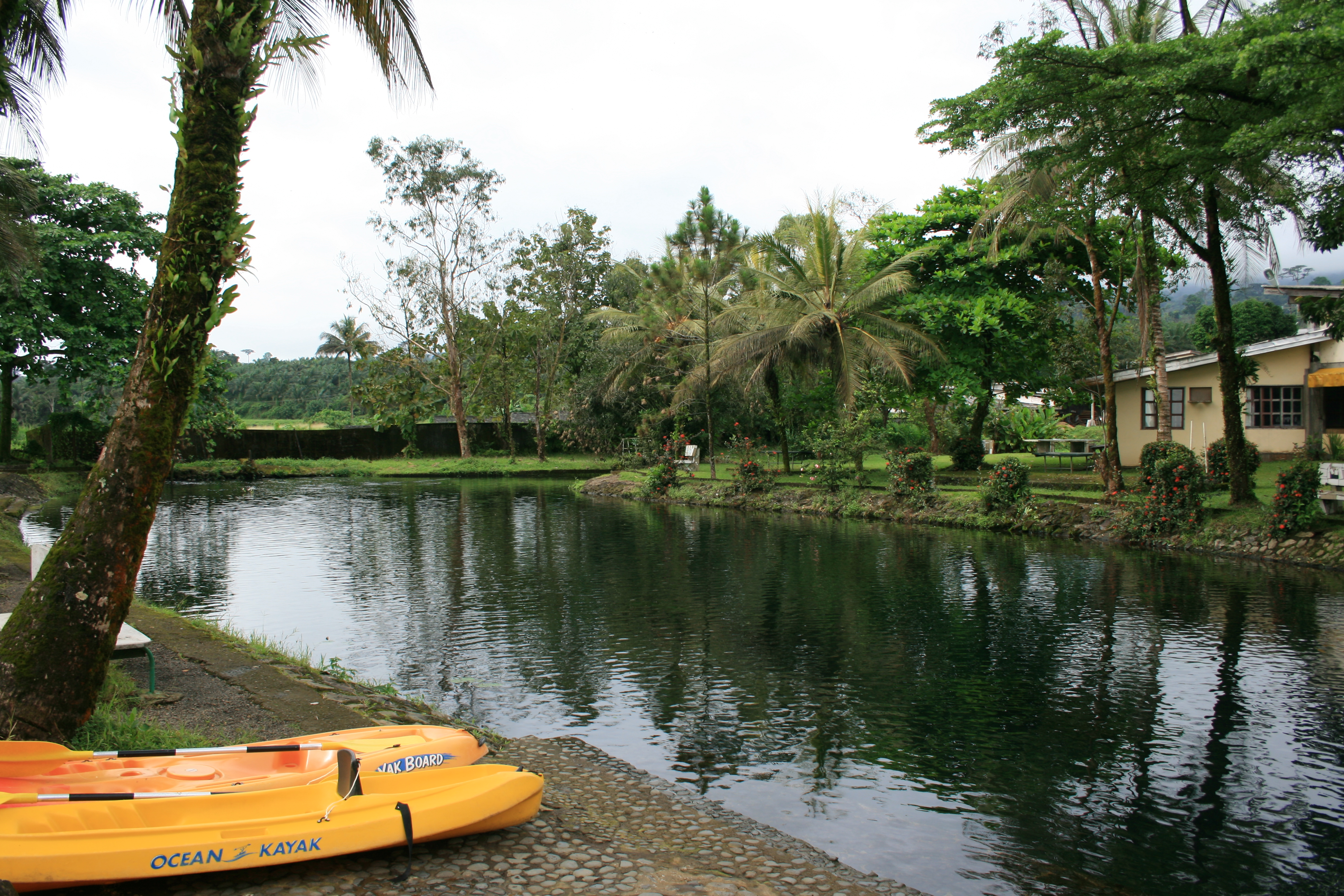
View of Semme Beach, Limbe

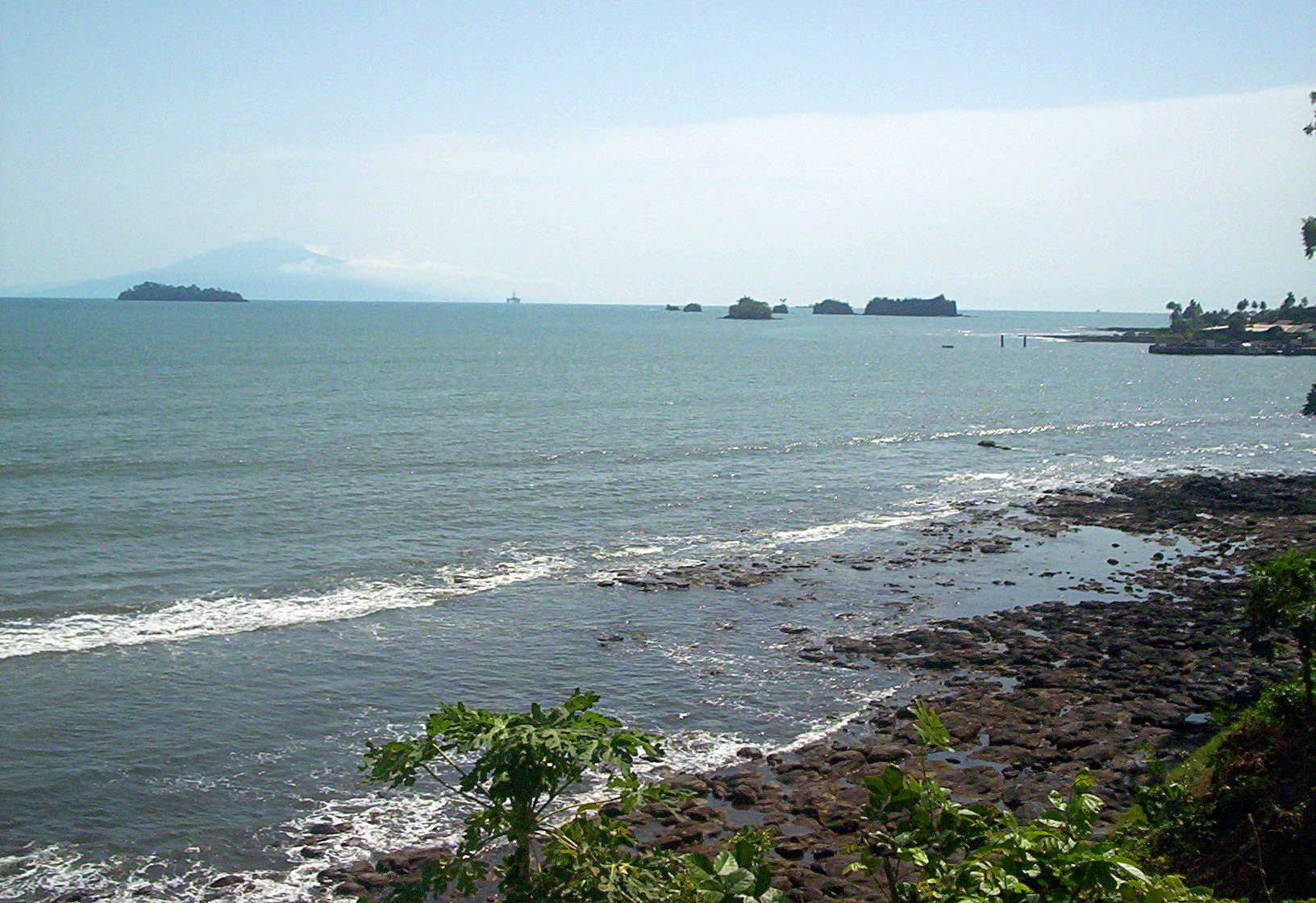
View of Bioko Beach, Limbe

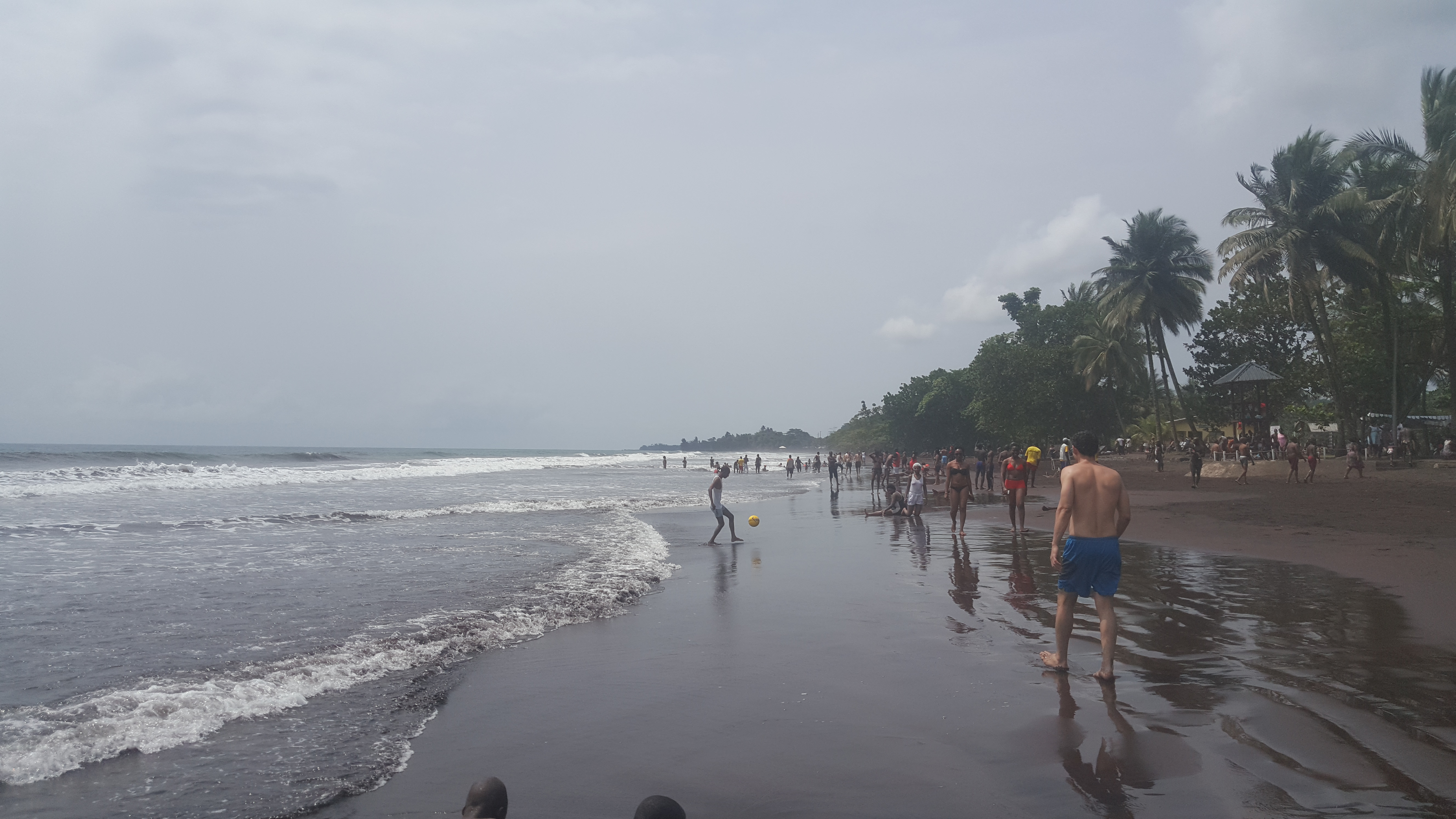
Tourist in Limbe Beach

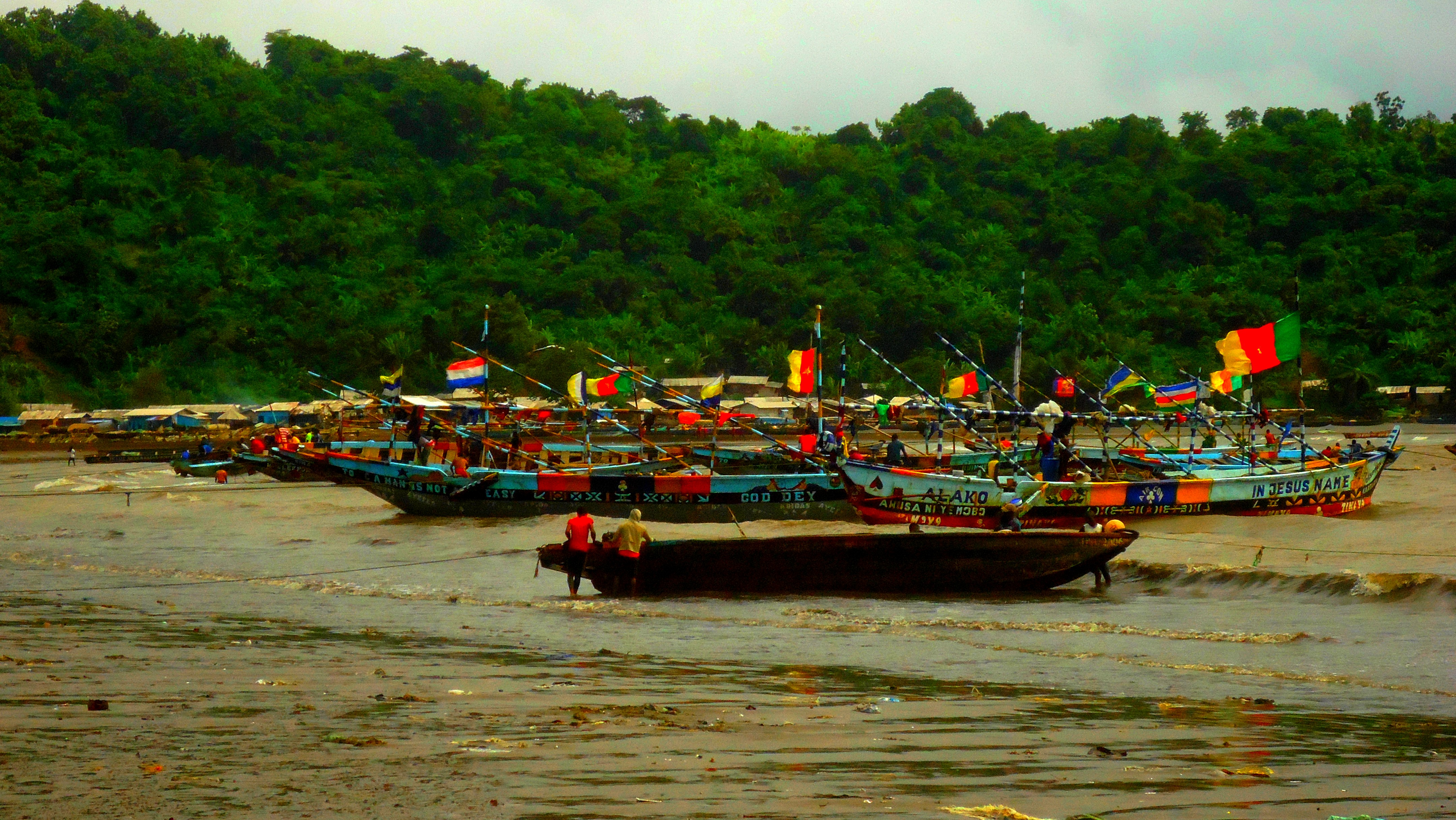
Fishing Canoes in Down Beach, Limbe

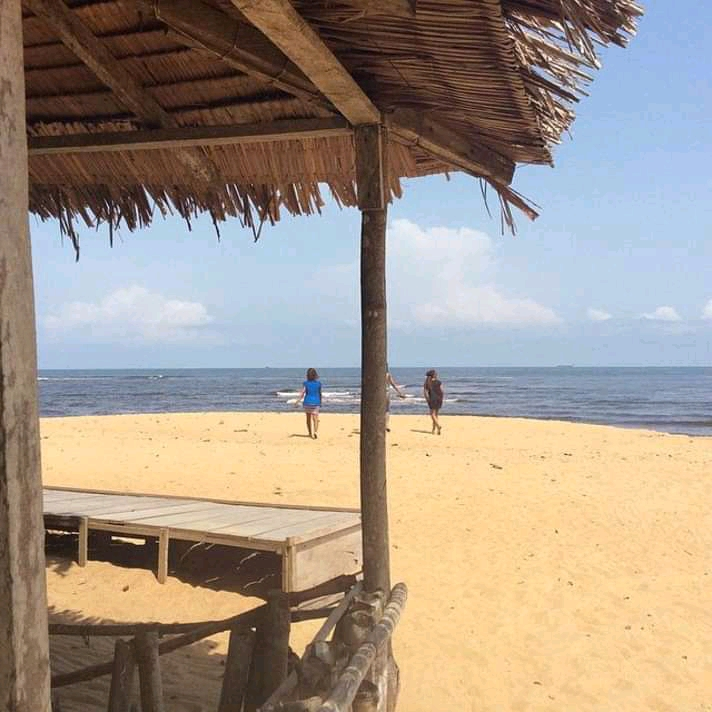
Limbe Beach with beautiful sandy shore

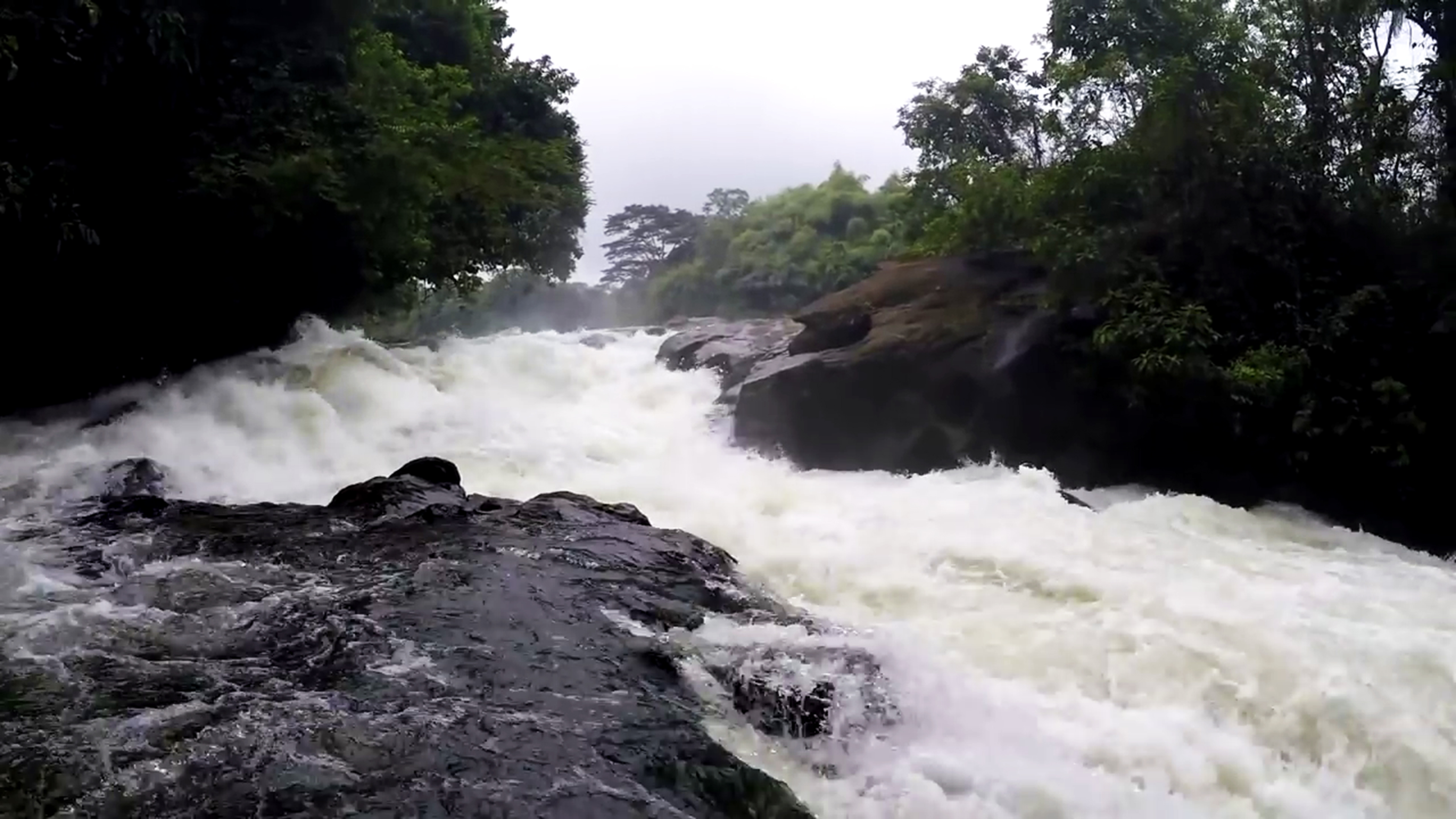
Waterfall in Korup Park

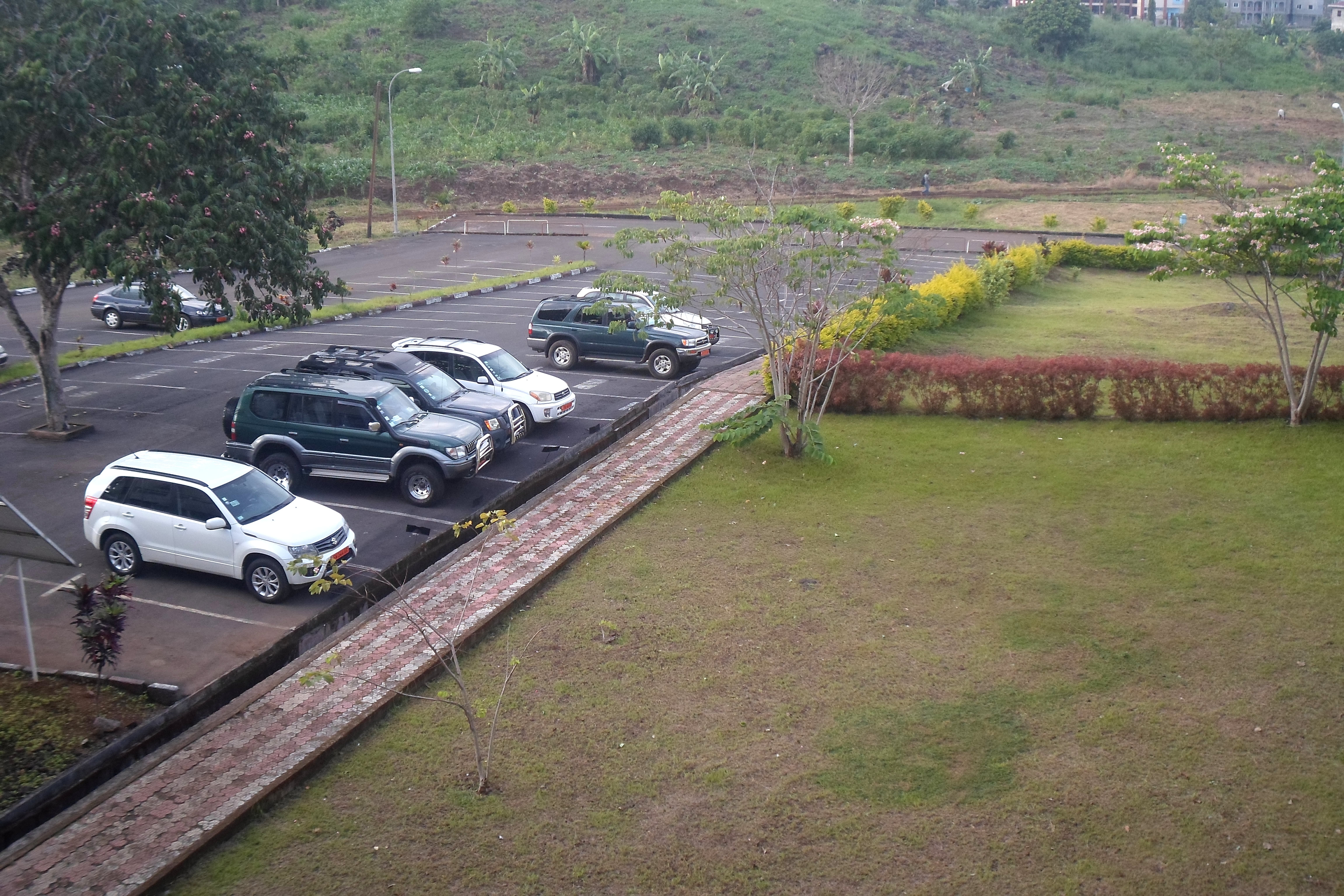
University of Buea Parking Space

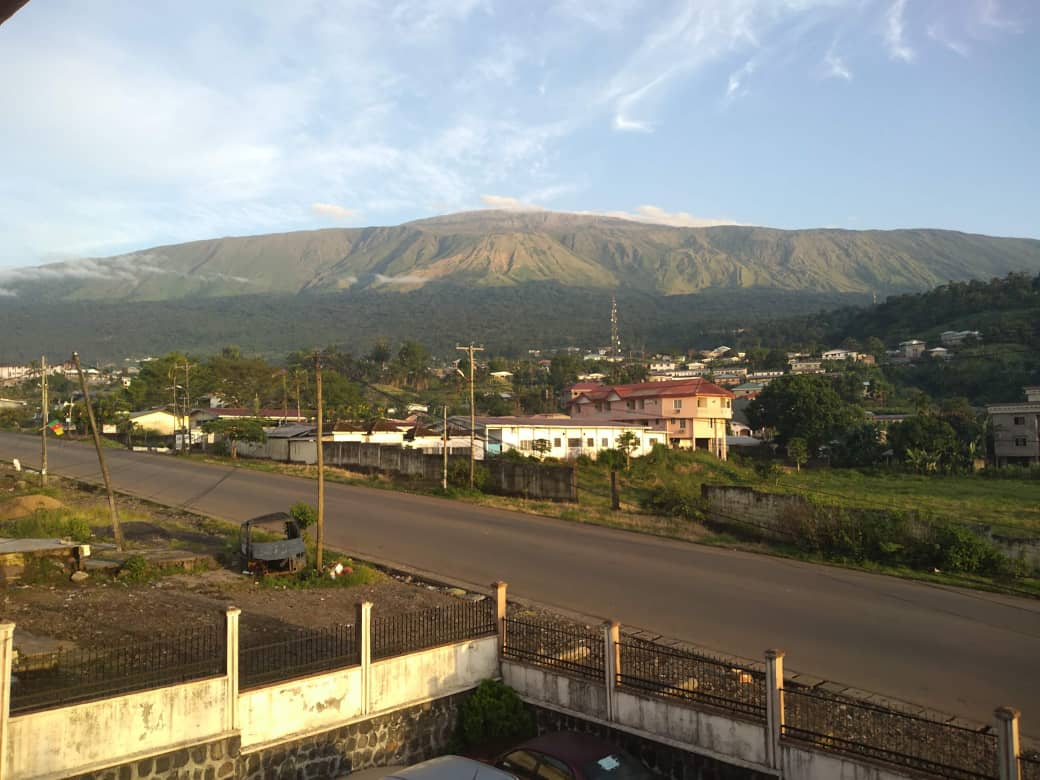
View of Mount Cameroon from Sopo

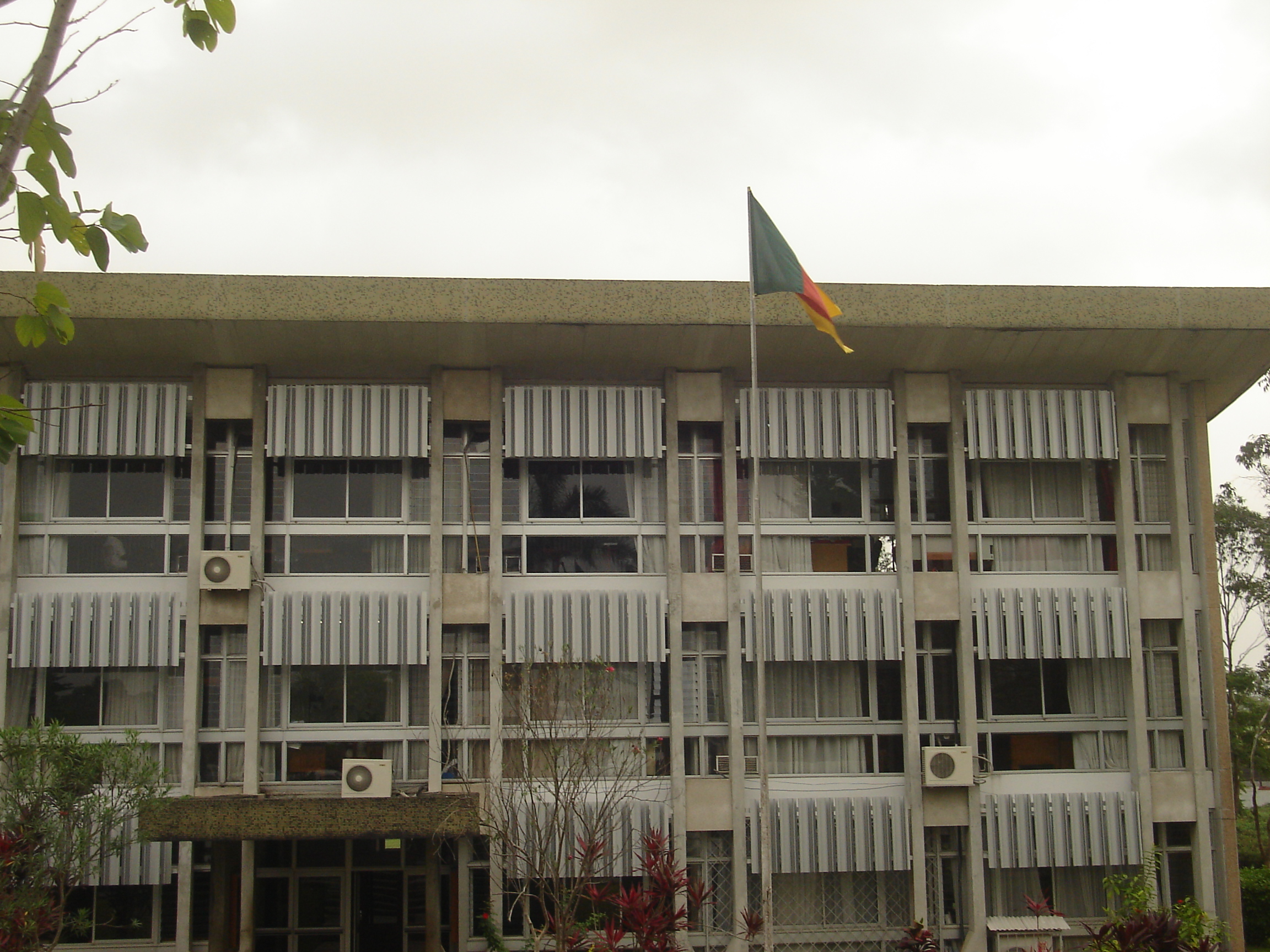
Administration Building, Buea University

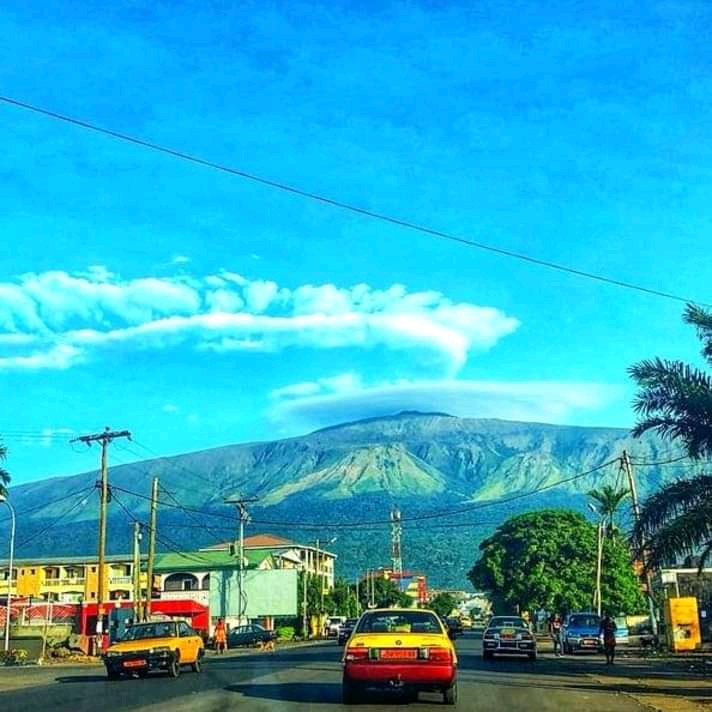
View of Buea City

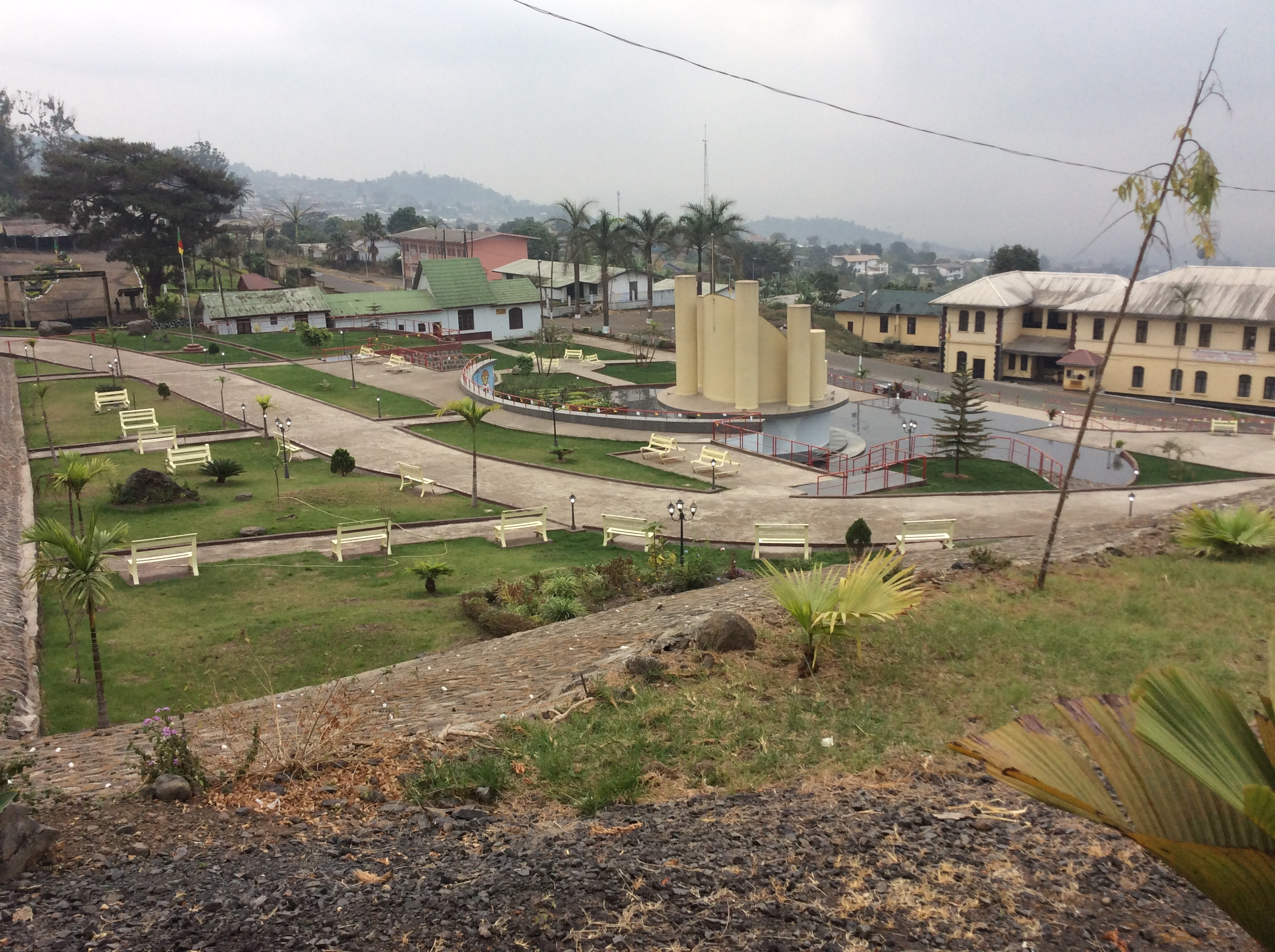
Extensive view of a Reunification Monument in Buea

Closer view of the Buea Reunification Monument
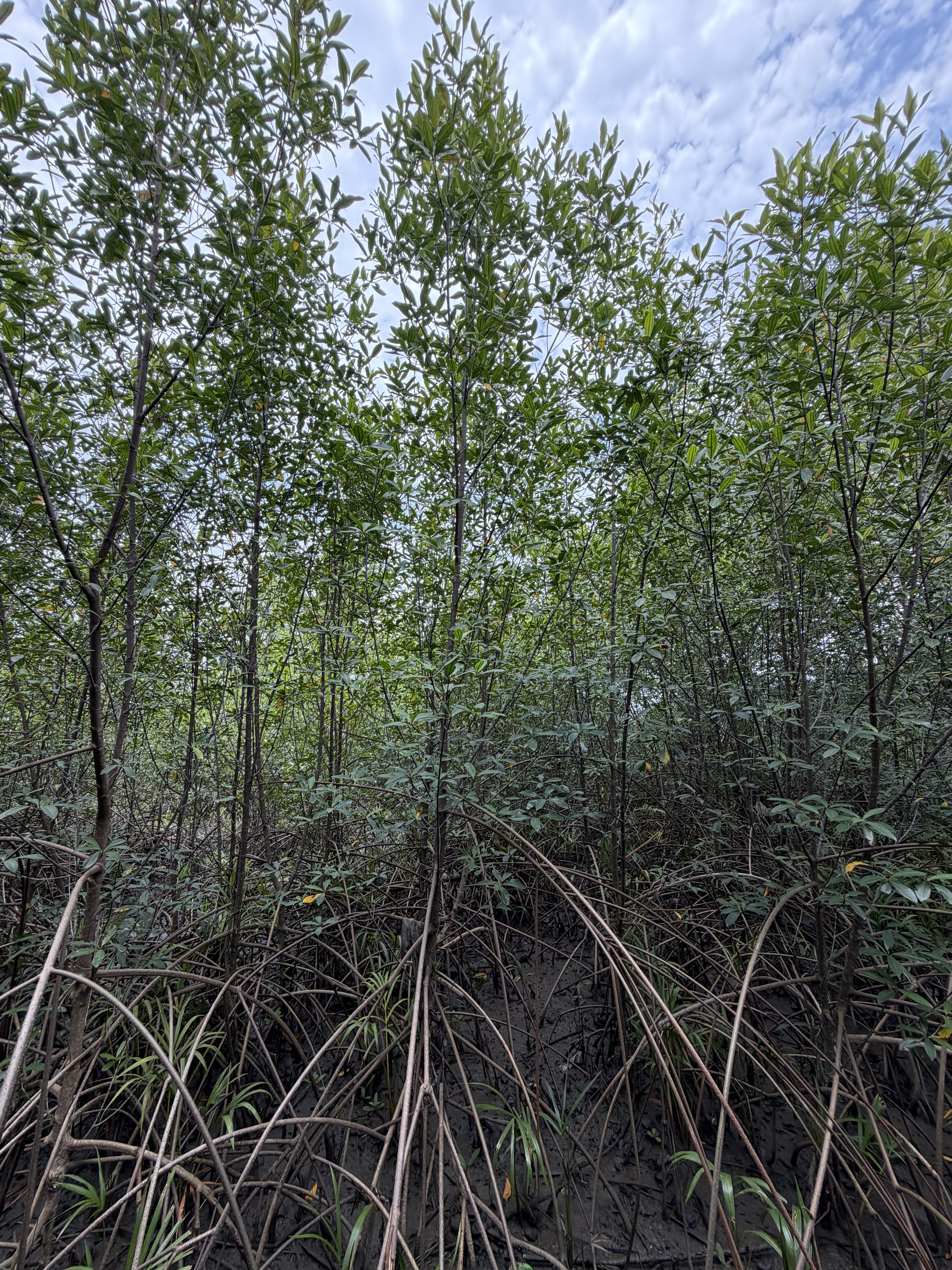
Mangroves off the coast of the Kombo Itindi District by the Ndian River Boats and ships off the coast of Idenau

== Culture ==
The province is largely Anglophone and Protestant Christian.

Folk dances

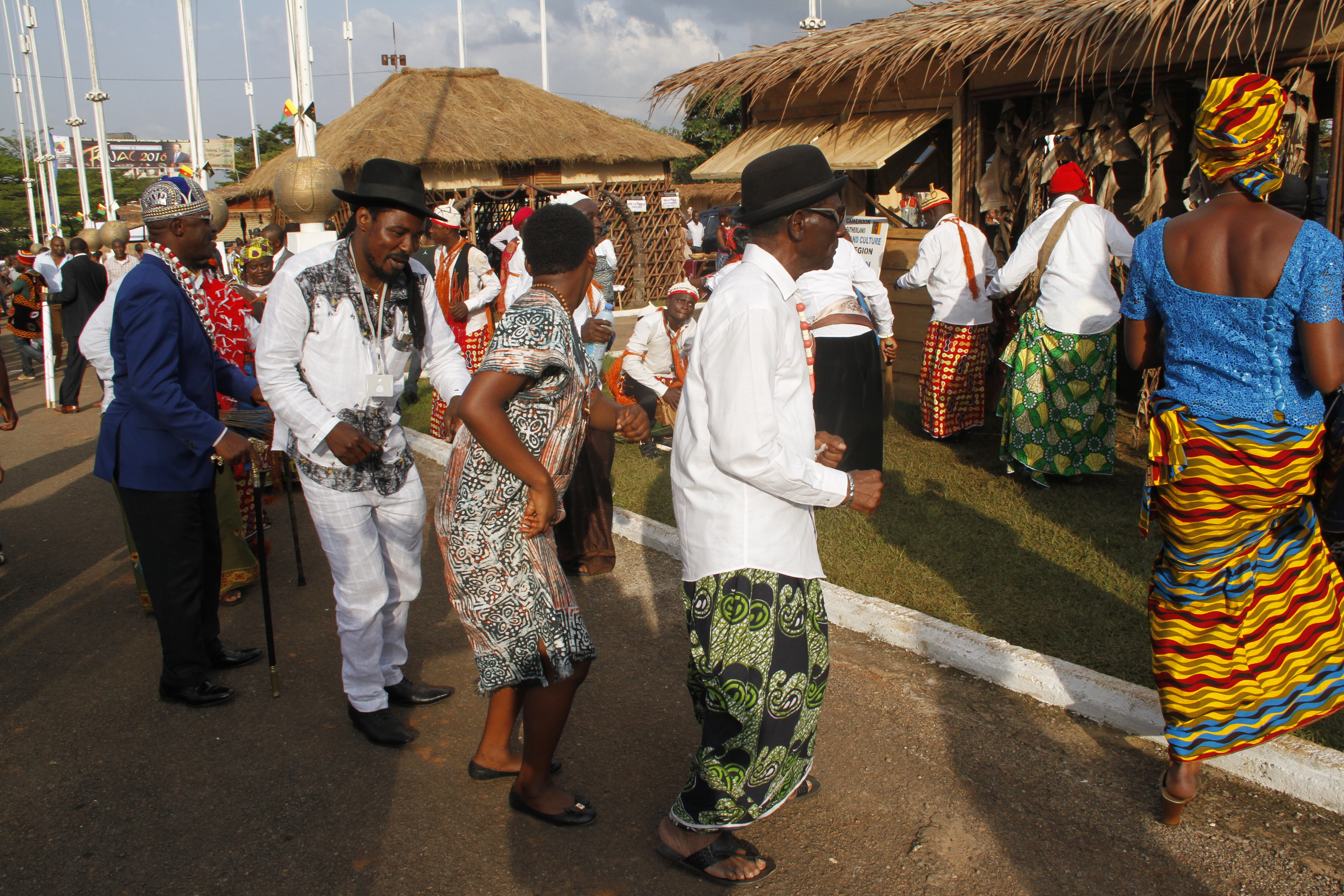

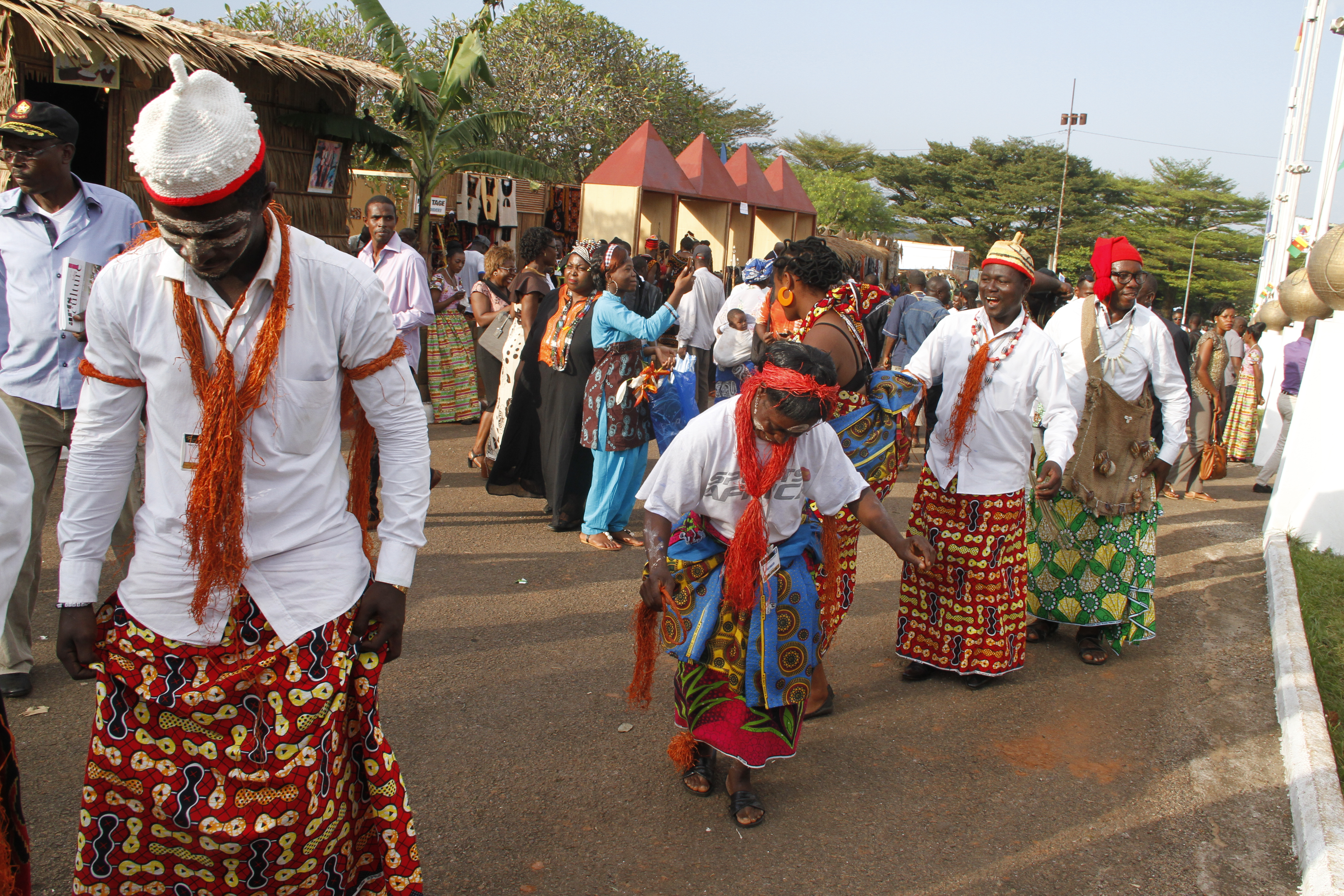

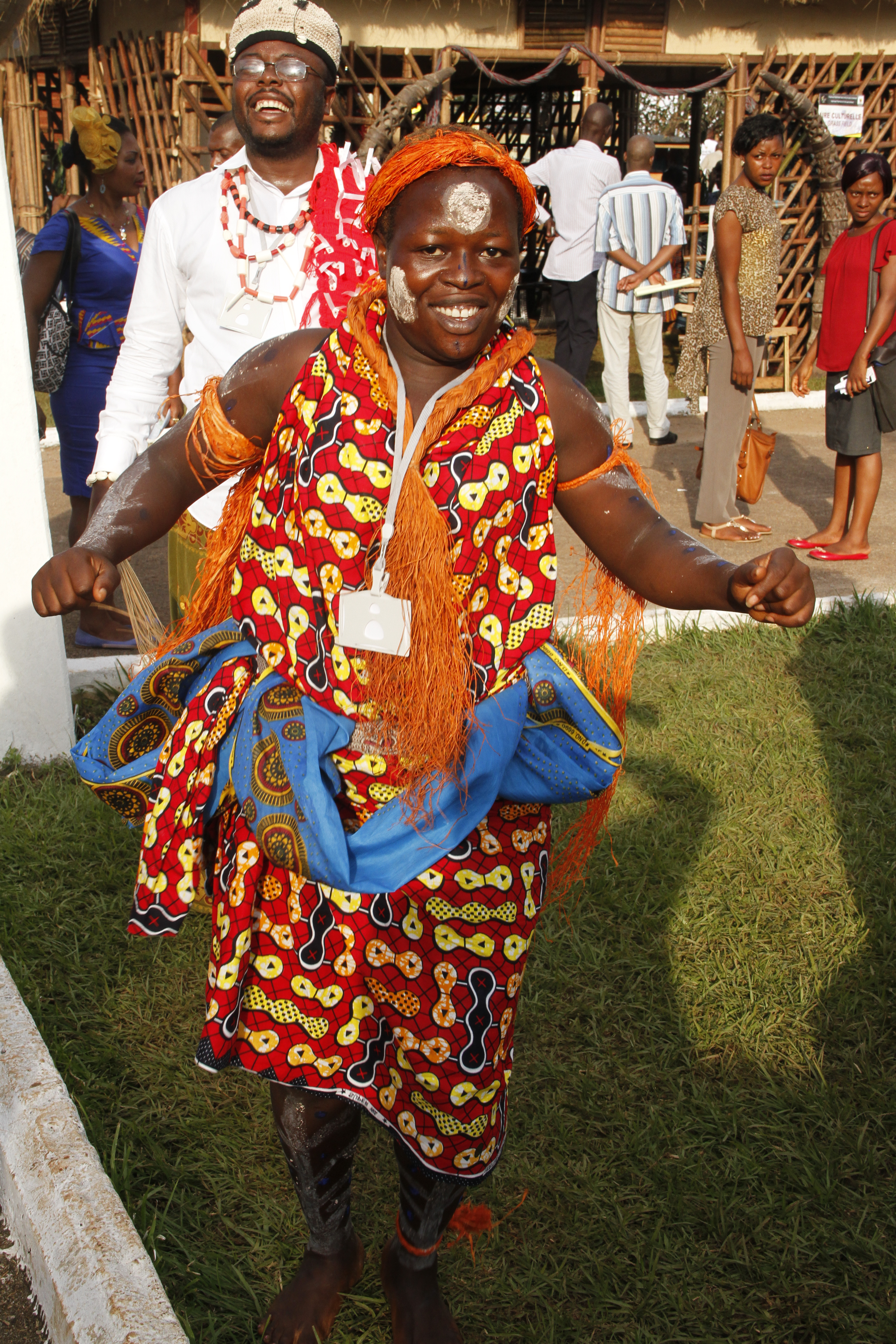

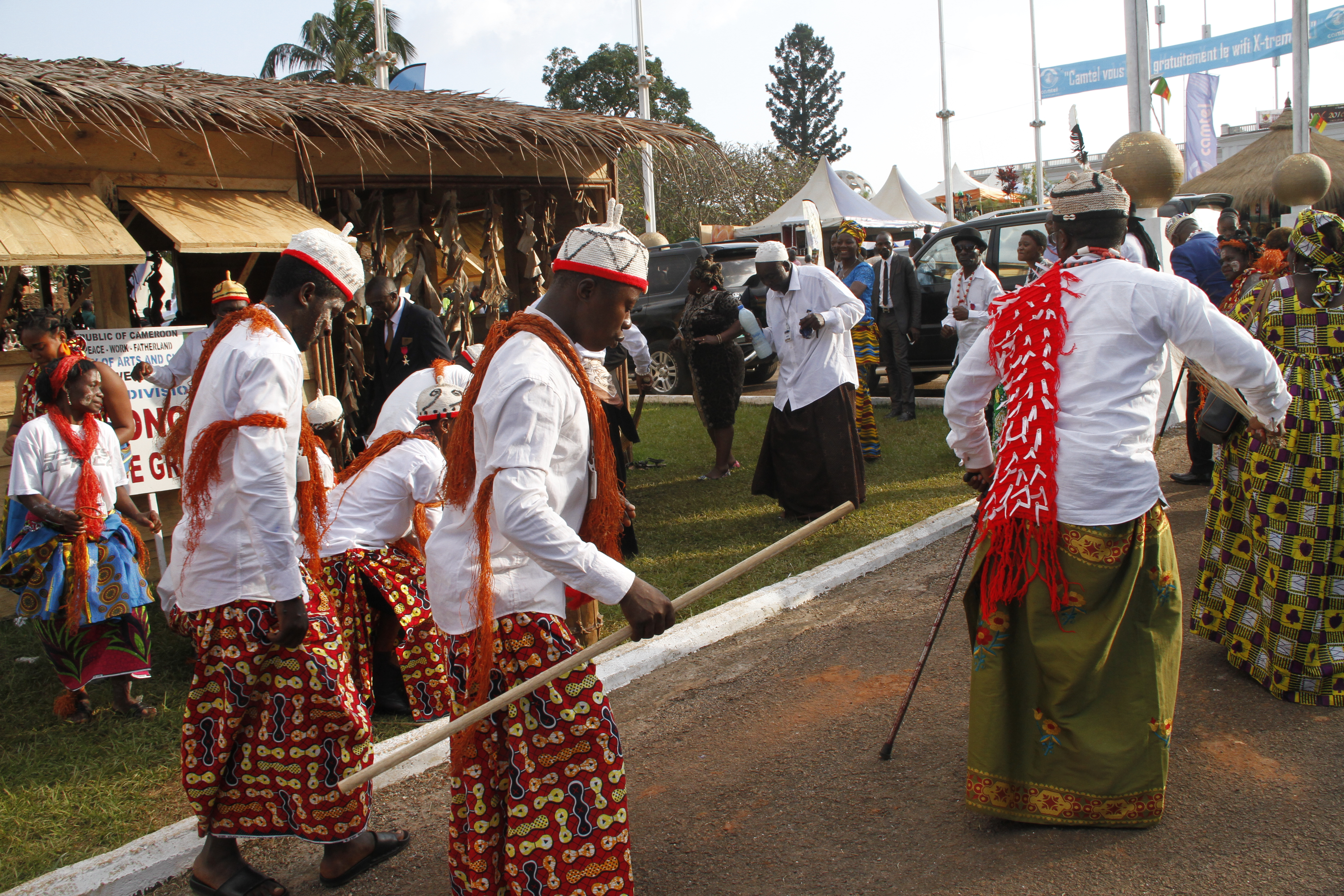

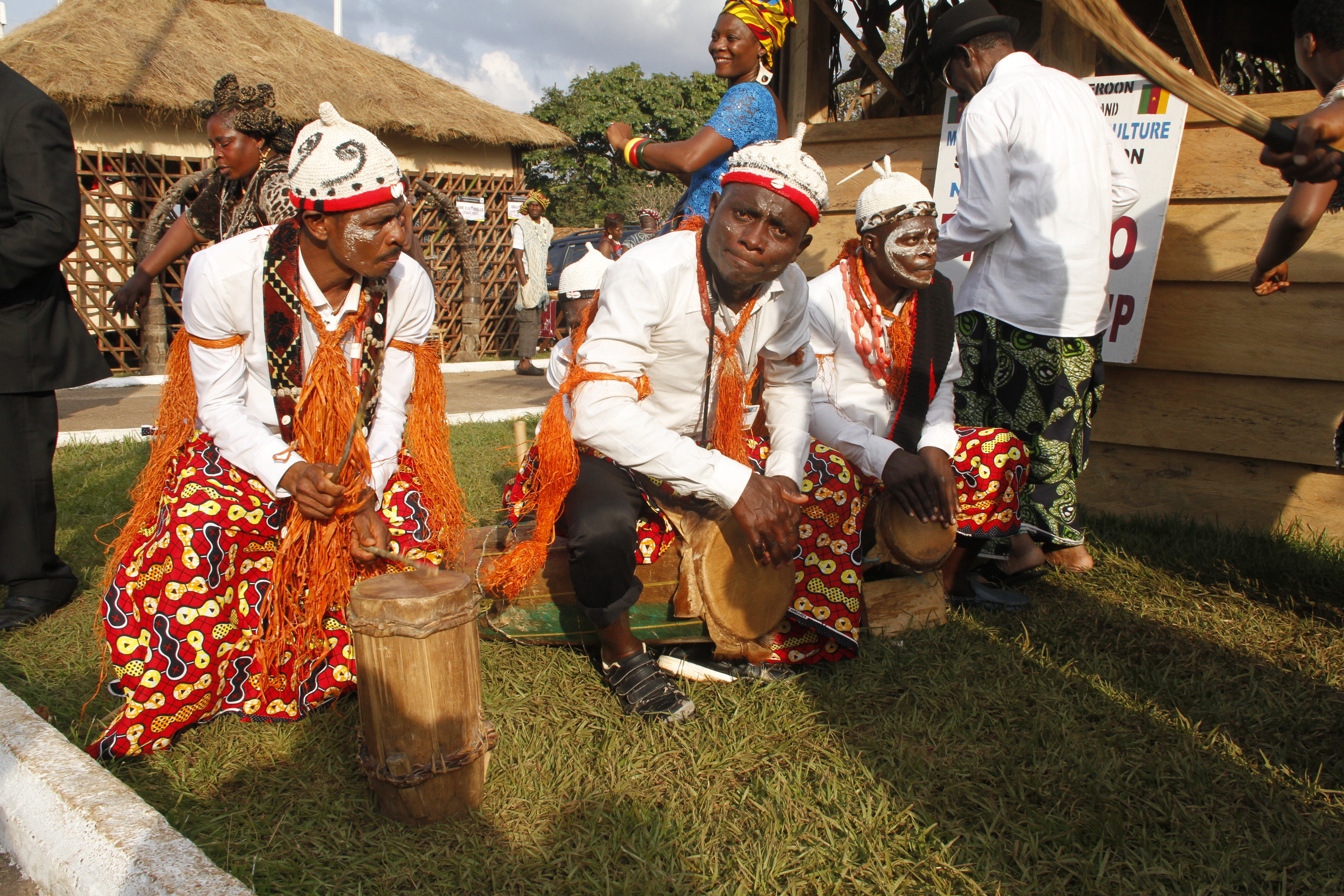

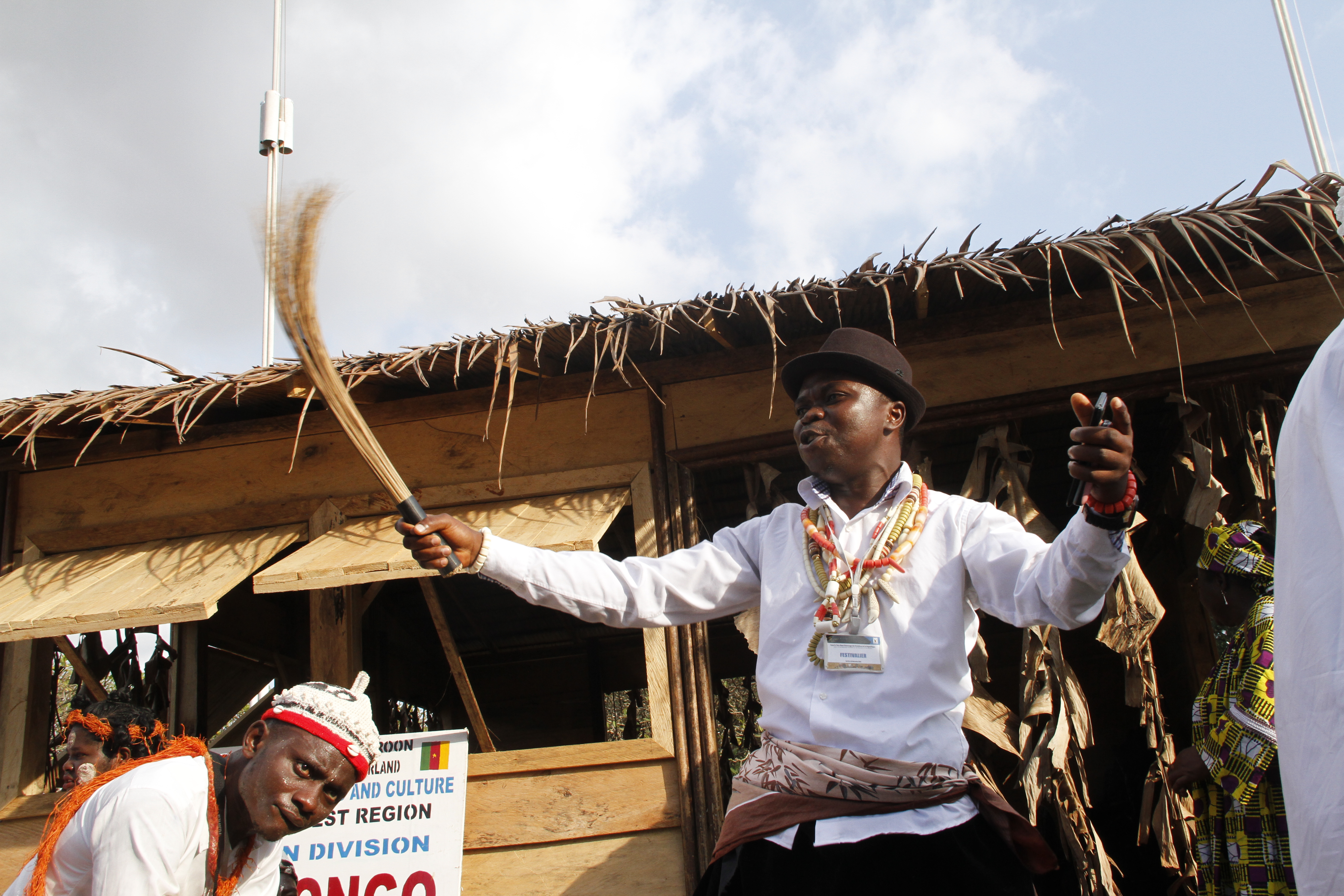

=== Common dishes in the region ===
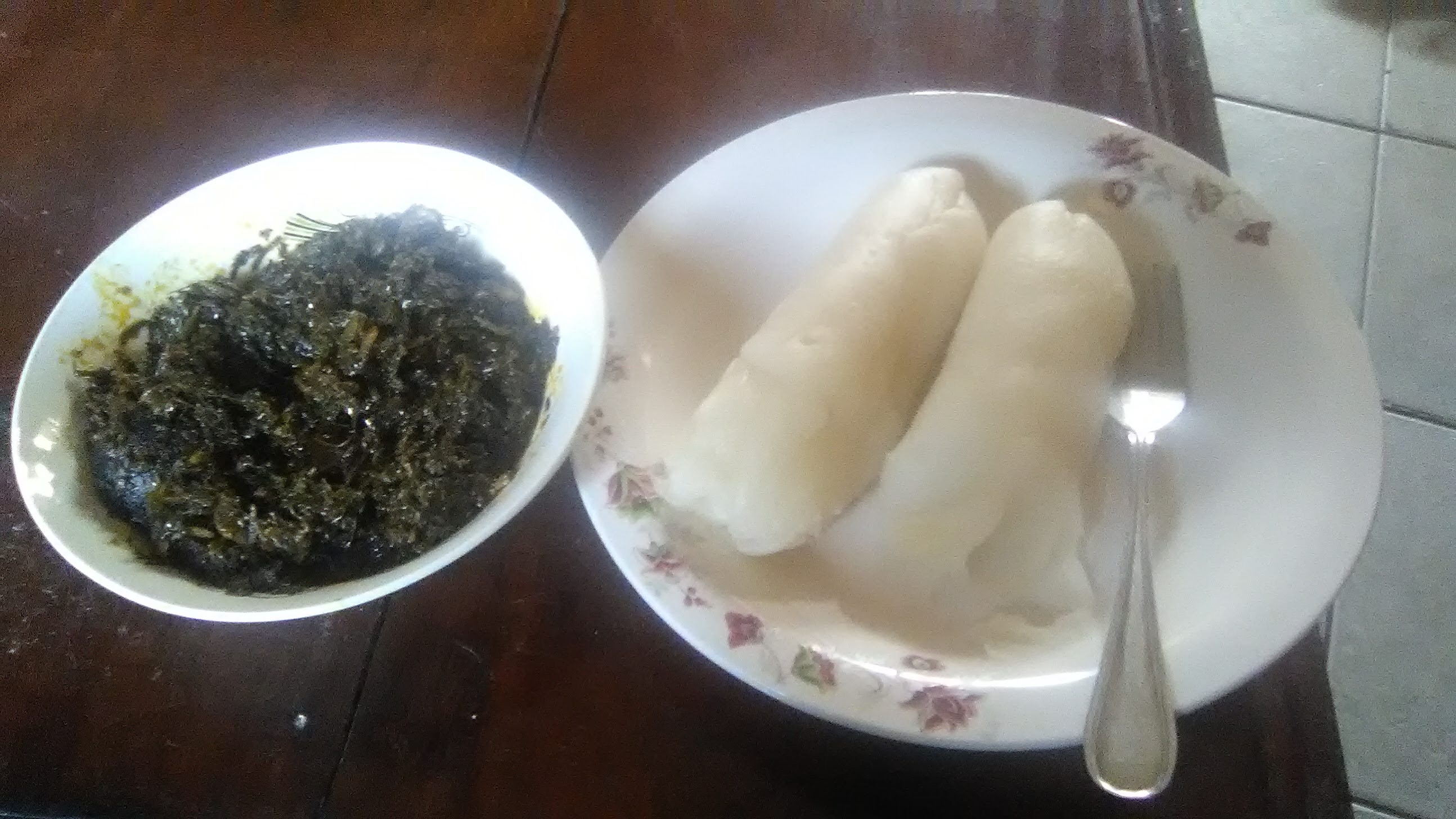
Eru and water fufu

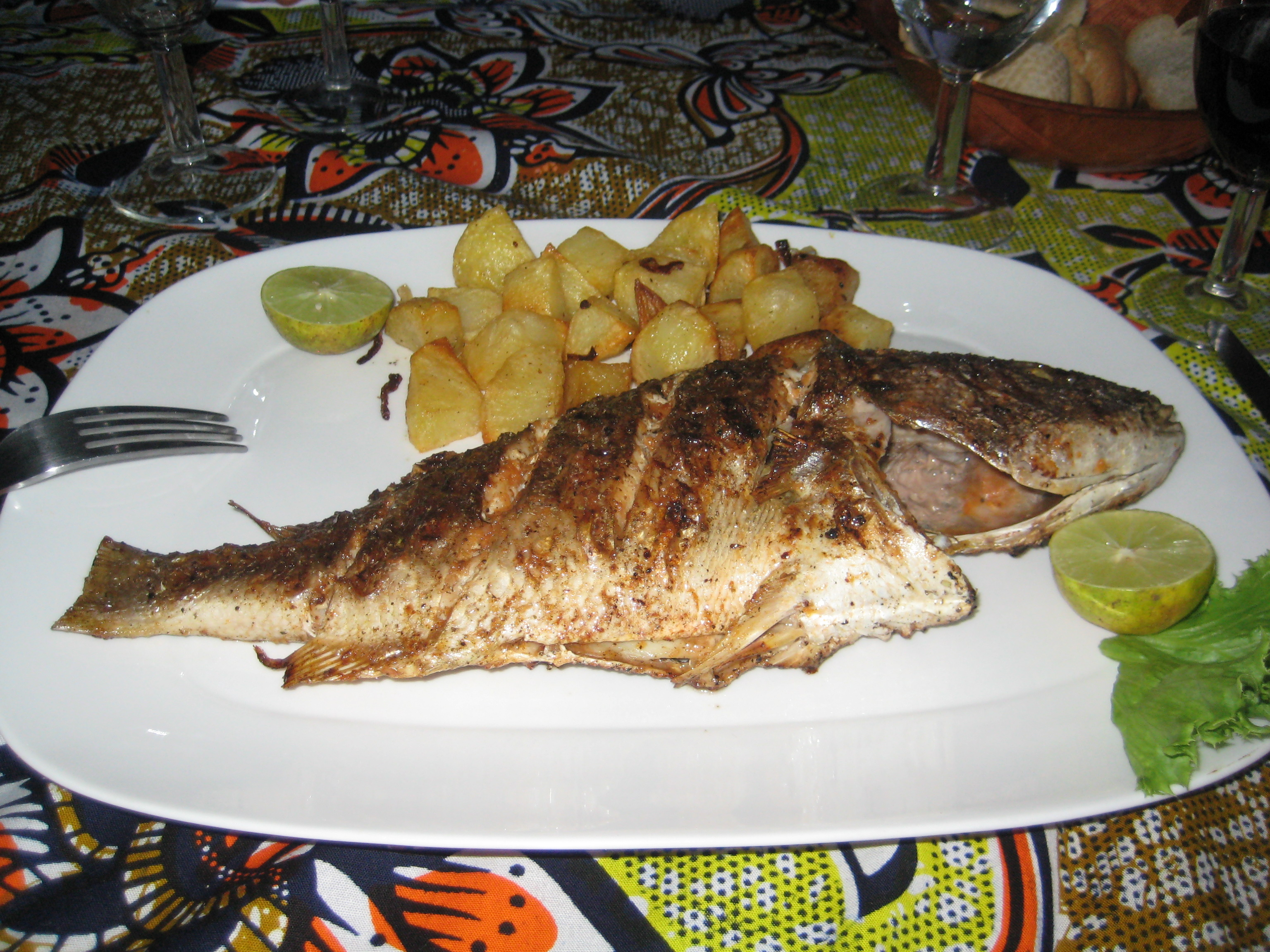
Fish barbecue and fried potato

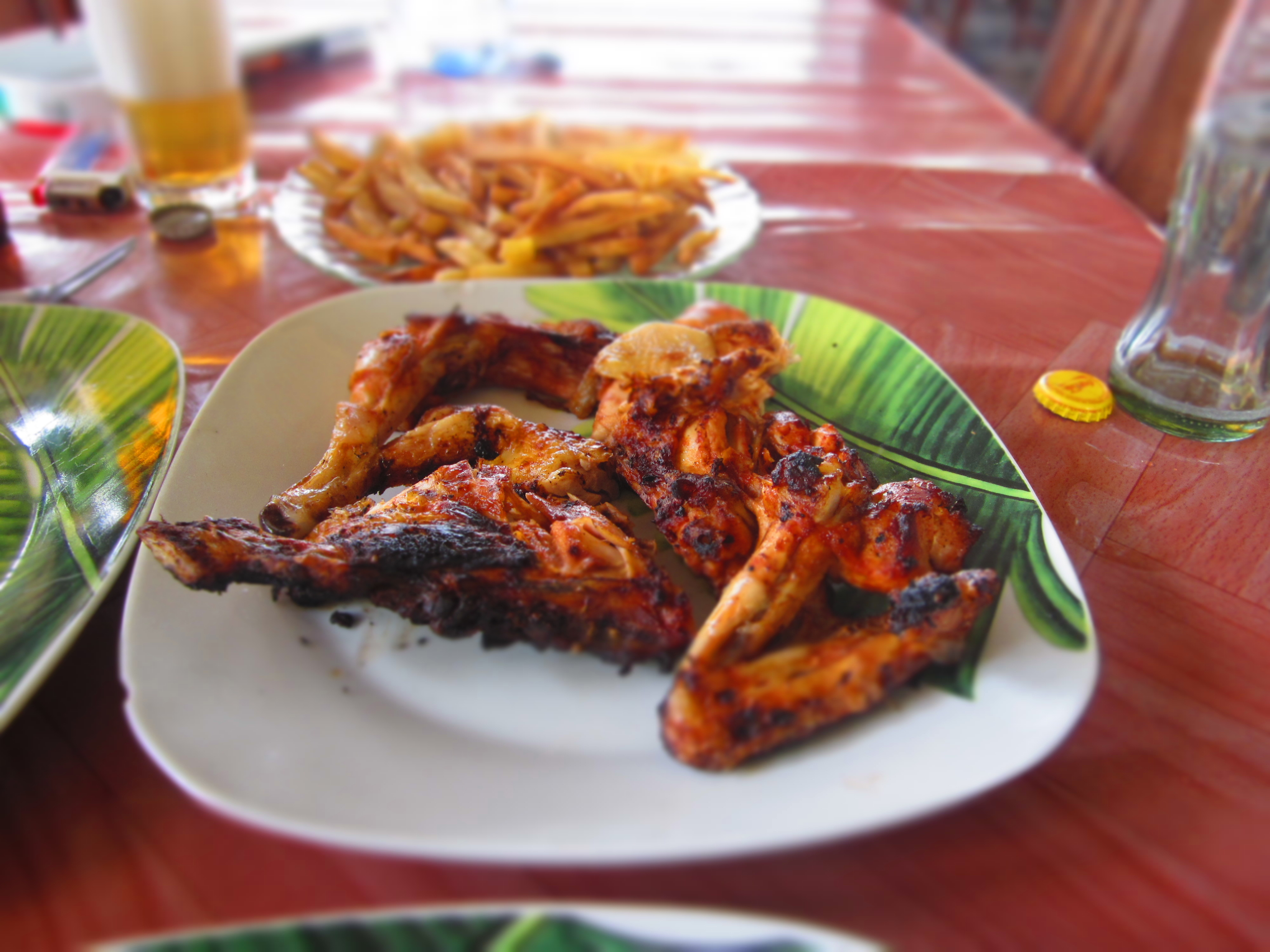
Chicken barbecue at "48 spices", Buea

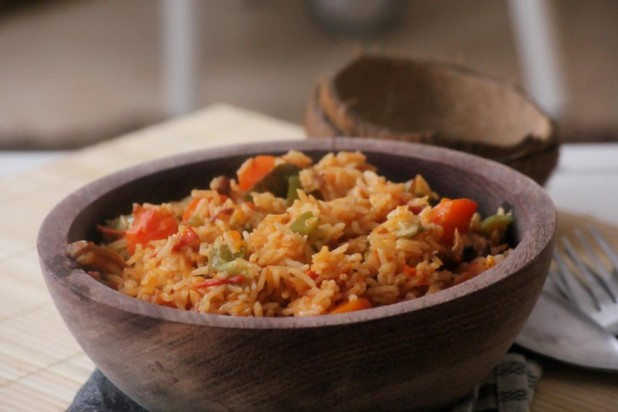
Jollof rice

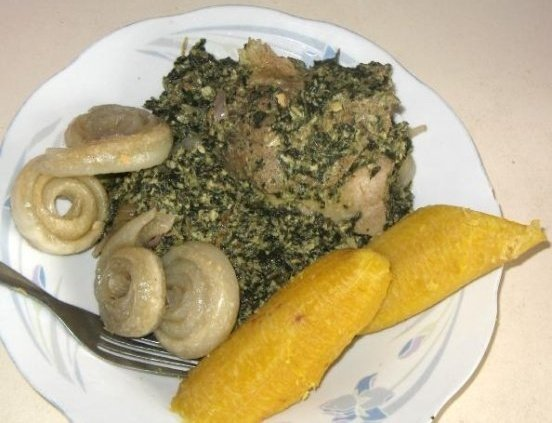
Ndole and plantains with bobolo

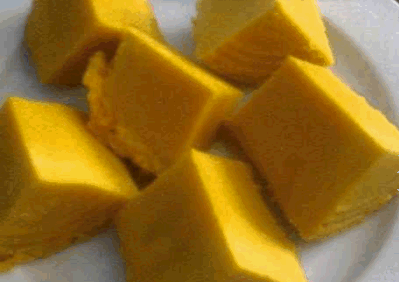
Koki, mostly eaten by Barondo people

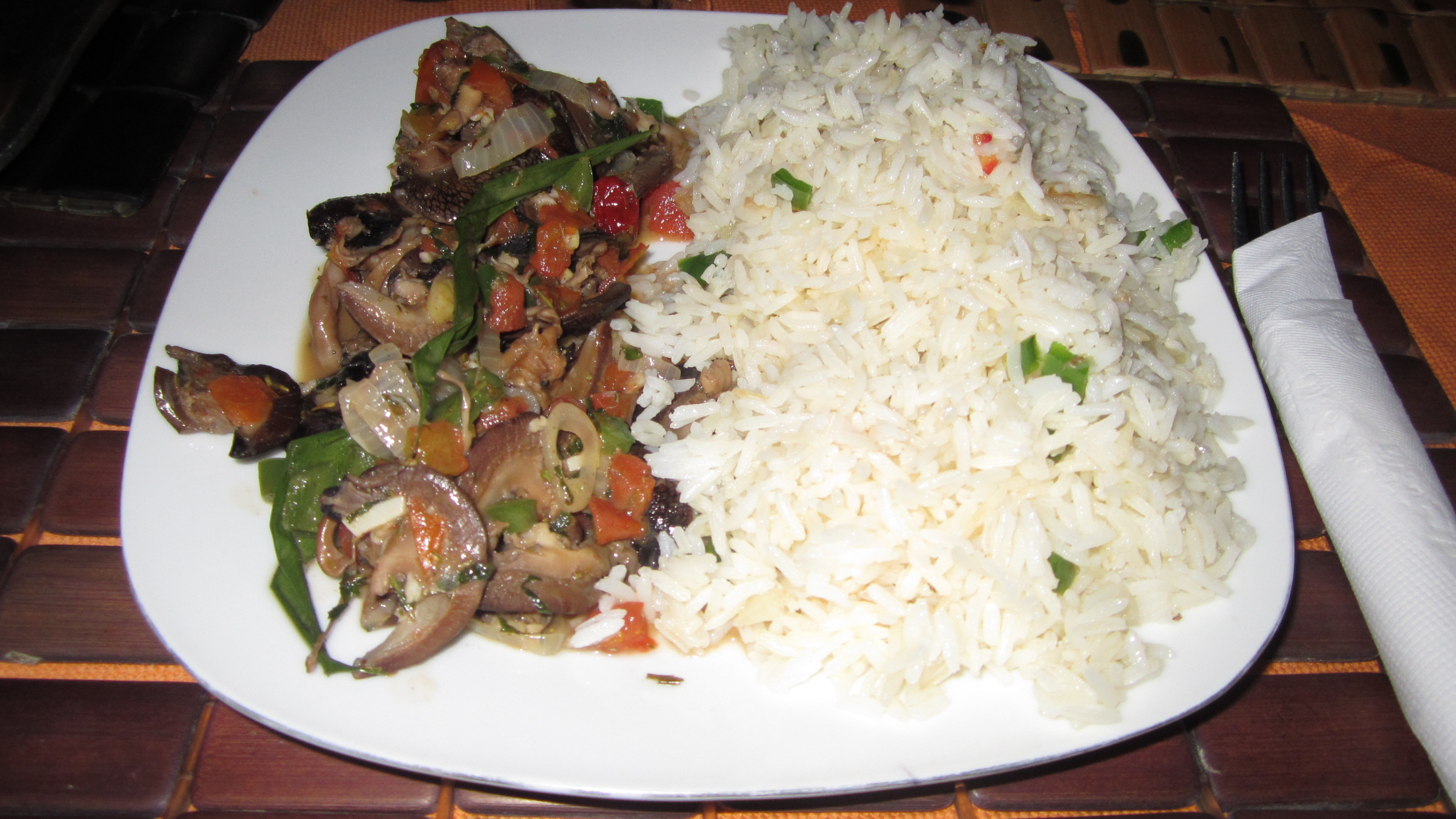
Snails and rice

== Demographics ==
Historical population
Year	Pop.	±% p.a.
1976	620,515	—
1987	838,042	+2.77%
2005	1,316,079	+2.54%
2015	1,553,320	+1.67%

== Healthcare ==
- Limbe Provincial Hospital
