= Bangem =

Coordinates: 5°05′N 9°46′E

- Commune and town
- Interactive map of Bangem
- Country: Cameroon
- Time zone: UTC+1 (WAT)

Bangem is a town and commune in Cameroon.

Bangem is the capital of the Koupé-Manengouba division (consisting of the Bangem, Tombel, and Nguti subdivisions) and is also considered the heartland of the Bakossi tribe. Nestled halfway up Mount Manenguba and its famous twin lakes, Bangem enjoys a cool, rainy climate.

The dry season is short and lasts from November to March, and there are rains the rest of the year. The road network is deplorable and travel in the wet season can be slow and uncomfortable.

Bangem has roads to Melong, Tombel, and Nguti, but only the Melong-Bangem road is passable by car, the others can be passed on a bike.

Bangem has among the most tourist potential of any part of Cameroon. Currently, a slightly developed tourist site at the crater lakes of Mount Manenguba (about 10 km uphill from Bangem) is managed by the Bangem council. More inaccessible is the nearby Bakossi National Park which has some of the most diverse rain forests, with exceptional species and a diversity of plants. Furthermore, the park has chimpanzees and a large population of mandrills. The nearby Bayang-Mbo Wildlife Sanctuary also boasts forest elephants, chimpanzees, pangolins, and other interesting creatures. More information on possible tourist destinations can be found online.

The Bangem area is home to many species of interesting birds, reptiles, amphibians, and fish as well, including the world's largest frog, the Goliath frog, the Mount Kupe bushshrike, various species of hornbills, etc. Furthermore, the nearby Lake Bermin boasts of the highest species diversity of fish as compared to the size of the lake, of any lake in the world. The 9 tilapia species are endemic sister species, implying sympatric speciation, making it of critical interest to conservationists and evolutionary biologists alike.

The area, however, remains under threat of attack from guerrilla forces belonging to the Ambazonian forces that operate in the region and are seeking independence from Cameroon. In 2017, the mayor was kidnapped, and as such, the area in general is unsafe, and a visit at certain times might not be recommended, such as during festivals, when the guerrilla pick up their attacks.

== Farming ==
Bangem is made up predominantly of farmers and produces "water fufu", cocoyams, cassava, plantains, and corn.

Every Wednesday, the general market is held in Bangem. However, other villages have their markets too, like Muambong, Nkikoh, Ekambeng, Mboasum, and Muaku.

== People ==
Bangem possesses many elites as Elung Paul Che, Phillip Ngolle Ngwesse, Ekane Michael, Mark Kogge, Ekane Ivo Ekoti, and Mbolle Epie, Ekungwe Christopher Kang, Akume Daniel Akume, Ekongwese Divine Nnoko, Mbong Michael, Elume Ekungwe-Kang.

Bangem also possesses several youth elites who have been named as Junior Parliamentarians in the Cameroon National Assembly:

- Henry Makogge (2012)
- Ekane Loic Evrade (2013)
- Enongene Sammy (2014)

== See also ==
- Communes of Cameroon
