= Mbule =

- Location in Cameroon
- Coordinates: 4°50′23″N 9°38′49″E
- Country: Cameroon
- Region: Southwest
- Department: Koupé-Manengouba
- Time zone: UTC+1 (WAT)

Mbule or Mbulle is a small community in Cameroon, to the north of Tombel in the Southwest Region, on the slopes of Mount Kupe.

== Conflict ==
On 31 December 1966 a Land Rover was attacked by unknown perpetrators while near Mbule. Four passengers were killed including three Bakossi. Tensions had been building between the Bakossi and Bamileke migrants to the region, and the incident triggered a rampage in which many Bamileke were killed.

== Wildlife ==
In 1979 a single specimen of Ardisia koupensis was collected from the western slopes of Mount Kupe, just above Mbule. Since then, two other locations have been found on the mountain above Kupe village. The plant, which grows in the understorey of mid-altitude to submontane closed canopy forest, was on the 2010 IUCN Red List of Threatened Species, classified as Endangered. Mount Kupe was formerly covered in forest above around 300 metres (980 ft), but cultivation has gradually encroached. Near Mbule the forest is now cleared up to around 1,000 metres (3,300 ft).

== Agriculture ==
In 2008 young farmers had begun to plant oil palms in Mbulle, but they did not have a processing machine, and lacked fertilizers and chemicals. They also had no way to get their crop to market.
