= Mbo people (Cameroon) =

Regions with significant populations
- Cameroon: 67,000

Languages
- Mbo language

The Mbo people are a Bantu ethnic group in Cameroon.

== History ==
The Mbo are a Bantu group of the Mbo plain, inhabiting the Littoral Region mainly the Mungo Division around Nkongsamba, Southwest Region and Melong subdivisions and in the West Region, Menoua Division, Santchou Subdivision and Upper Nkam Division, Kekem Subdivision of Cameroon.

The Bakossi Forest Reserve, which includes the Bakossi National Park, is mainly inhabited by the Bakossi people, but the population also includes Mbo as well as Manehas, Bakem, Baneka, and immigrant Bamiliké people. The Mbo and Banyangi people live in and around the Banyang-Mbo Wildlife Sanctuary. They hunt for bushmeat, which they sell fresh or smoked, and which is a good deal cheaper than other locally available forms of protein.

The Mbo originate from the Santchou area of the Southern Grassfield, but due to migration patterns and tribal rivalries, they have been restricted to the southern banks of the Betse and Betenten rivers since 1900, also known as Mbemboland (land of the Mbo or Mbo Country). Mbemboland consists of Melong, Santchou, Kékem and eastern parts of Nguti District.

They have a long tradition of conflict with the neighboring Bangwa people due to disputes over boundaries, oil palm groves, and kidnappings for slavery.

The Bamileke chiefdoms of Fongo Tongo, Foto, Foreke Dschang, and Fondongela all claim origin from the Mbo. In other Bangwa chiefdoms, minor subchiefs claim Mbo ancestry.

The Mbo people are extremely poor. They do not have access to medical treatment, so there is no HIV testing and counseling, although HIV/AIDS is prevalent.

== Genetics ==
In 2013, discovery of a previously unknown Y-chromosomal haplogroup, dubbed haplogroup A00 (AF6), was announced. First found in the Y-chromosome of an African American male submitted for commercial genealogical analysis, the haplogroup was identified in eleven Y chromosomes of Mbo males (out of a sample of 174, corresponding to 6.3%).

The discovery of this division of "haplogroup A00" ancestral from A0-FGC27410 pushes back the estimation of the age of Y-chromosomal Adam, the most recent ancestor through direct paternal lines of all humans currently alive to ~250,000 years ago.
