= Ngab =

- Location in Cameroon
- Coordinates: 4°46′4″N 9°39′32″E
- Country: Cameroon
- Region: Southwest
- Department: Koupé-Manengouba
- Time zone: UTC+1 (WAT)

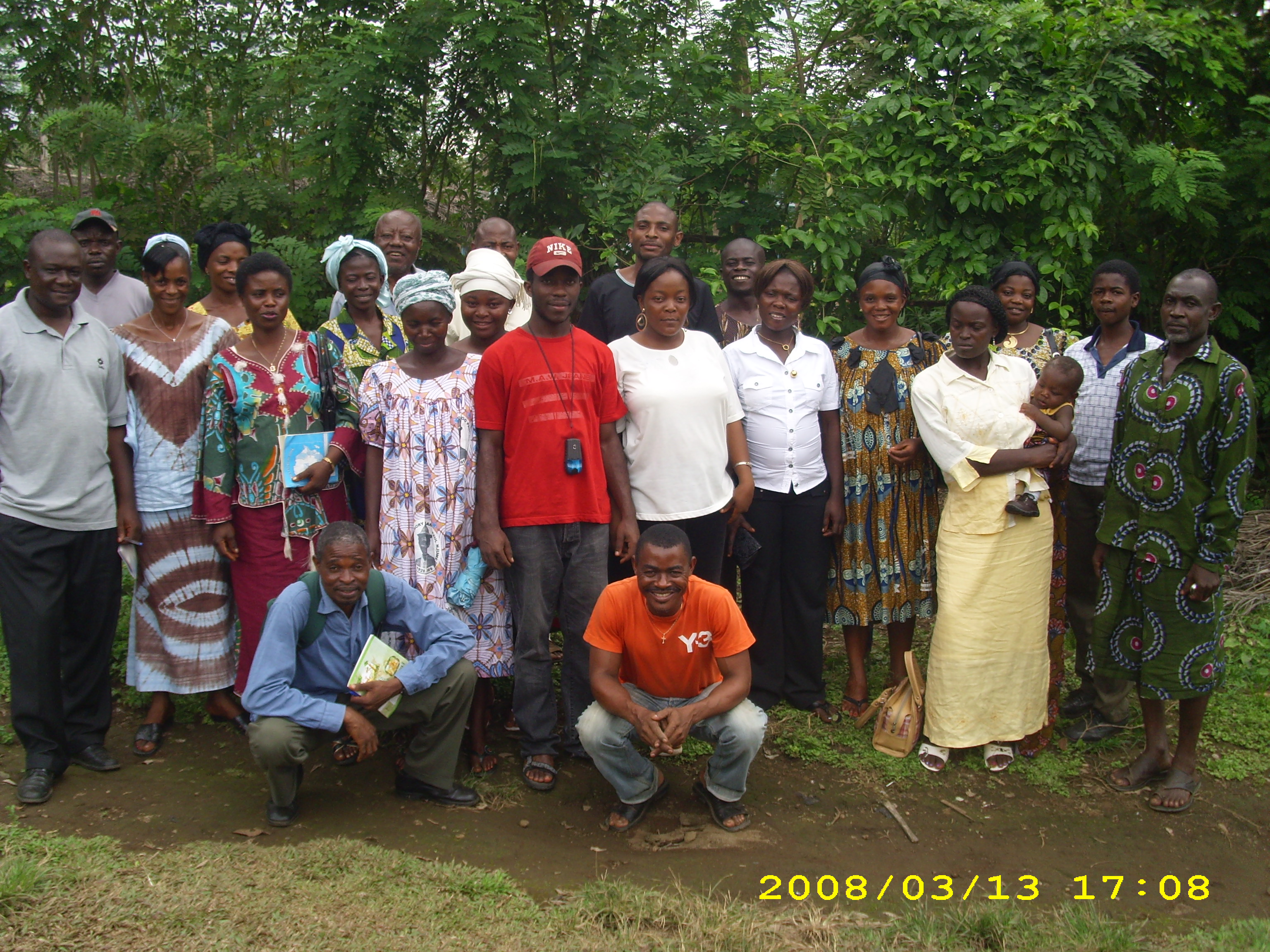
Farming trainees at Ngab in 2008

Ngab or Ngabe is a community in Cameroon, just to the north of Tombel in the Southwest Region, in the country of the Bakossi people.

In 1998 the Ngab-Tombel community received some assistance from Helvetas Cameroon Swiss Association for International Co-operation.
