= Bakossi =

Bakossi may refer to:

- Bakossi Forest Reserve, a protected area in Cameroon
- Bakossi language, one of the languages of Cameroon
- Bakossi Mountains, a mountain range in Cameroon
- Bakossi people, an indigenous group in Cameroon
