= Emmanuel Neossi =

Cameroonian businessman and cocoa processor

- Born: c. 1973; Kékem, Haut-Nkam, West Region, Cameroon
- Other name: Emmanuel Néossi
- Education: Accounting, technical high school of Kékem
- Occupations: Cocoa farmer, trader, businessman, industrialist
- Organization: Neo Industry SA
- Known for: Founding Neo Industry, a cocoa processing company in Kékem
- Title: Chairman of the board of directors, Neo Industry SA
- Children: 8

Emmanuel Neossi (also spelled Néossi; born c. 1973) is a Cameroonian cocoa trader, businessman and industrialist.

He founded Neo Industry, a cocoa bean processing company whose plant in Kékem, inaugurated in 2019, was presented as the first Cameroonian-owned cocoa processing factory.

== Biography ==
=== Childhood, education and early career ===
Neossi was born in Kékem, in the Haut-Nkam department of the West Region, and grew up on cocoa plantations. After studying accounting at the technical high school in Kékem, he took up cocoa farming and, with his mother's help, expanded his plot to 50 hectares. He then spent many years in cocoa trading.

=== Career ===
He founded Neo Industry in 2015. The company's plant in Kékem was inaugurated on 26 April 2019. It cost about 54 billion CFA francs, including state support, and was designed to process 32,000 tonnes of beans a year, about 10% of Cameroon's harvest, into cocoa butter, cocoa mass, powder and cake.

In November 2020, SCB Cameroon, a subsidiary of Attijariwafa Bank, launched a tender to dismantle the plant after Neo Industry struggled to repay a 13-billion-CFA-franc loan; the company had processed only 4,286 tonnes in the 2019–2020 season. The plant nevertheless remained in operation: in 2025 the company announced an expansion to raise its capacity to 80,000 tonnes a year by 2026. In May 2026, Neo Industry became the first Cameroon-based member of the International Cocoa Initiative, with Neossi as chairman of its board of directors.

Neossi also launched a public–private partnership project to build a shopping centre on the site of the former Congo market in Douala.

=== Personal life ===
Neossi is married and has eight children.

== See also ==
- Agriculture in Cameroon
