= Bakossi National Park =

National park in Cameroon

- Location within Cameroon
- Location: Cameroon
- Coordinates: 5.049907°N 9.567719°E
- Area: 293.2 km^{2} (113.2 sq mi)
- Established: 2008

The Bakossi National Park (BNP) is a protected area within the Bakossi Forest Reserve, created by a decree in early 2008. The park covers 29,320 hectares (72,500 acres), and was justified on the basis of preserving plant diversification.

== Location ==
The Bakossi Mountains are part of the Cameroon Line, running inland in a northeasterly direction from Mount Cameroon. The mountains have an area of about 230,000 square kilometres (89,000 sq mi) and typical elevation of 800 metres (2,600 ft) to 1,900 metres (6,200 ft). The highest peak is Mount Kupe at 2,064 metres (6,772 ft). The mountains contain what may be the largest area of cloud or submontane forest in West-Central Africa. The area includes the national park and the proposed Muanenguba ecological reserve to the east and Kupe ecological reserve to the south of the park.

The climate has a dry season between November and March, and a rainy season from April until October. The hottest month is January and the wettest month is August. The temperature ranges from 22 °C (72 °F) to 32 °C (90 °F), Rainfall is between 3 metres (9.8 ft) and 4 metres (13 ft) annually. Humidity is between 70% and 85%. The mountain slopes are mainly covered by fertile volcanic soil in which crops grow easily.

== Biodiversity ==
The Bakossi Landscape Area is part of the Cameroon Highlands ecoregion. The Bakossi landscape area includes a wide range of habitats at different heights. Staff from Kew Gardens and the IRAD-National Herbarium of Cameroon worked on preparing an inventory of plants in the Kupe-Bakossi region between 1995 and 2005. The area had not been known to have particularly rich diversity of plant life. The botanists found 2,440 plant species, a huge number. Of these, one in 10 species was new to science. 82 were strictly restricted to the area and 232 were threatened with extinction according to International Union for Conservation of Nature (IUCN) 2001 criteria.

One of the most interesting of the newly discovered species is Kupea martinetugei (Triuridaceae), a new species of saprophyte that completely lacks photosynthetic tissue. The species is part of a new genus and a new tribe. It is critically endangered, so far found only in two sites, each just a few square metres in area.

The area is home to important large mammals that include the drill, African forest elephant, chimpanzee, and Preuss's red colobus. The World Wide Fund for Nature (WWF), which facilitated creation of the park, has engaged in geospatial mapping of the distribution of key large mammals in the park. They are concentrated in the north and south of the park, perhaps due to greater availability of food and shelter and lower levels of hunting and farmland encroachment.

== Organization ==
A field consultation program for gazettement of Bakossi National Park was completed in 2004, jointly supported by the World Wildlife Fund's Coastal Forests Programme and the San Diego Zoo's Center for Conservation and Research for Endangered Species. The local communities were involved in the process, and over eighty villages signed the legislative support for the Park's creation. Some boundary changes were recommended, as were rules to define and preserve the legal rights of the communities. It was expected that sacred forest areas would be incorporated into the park, expected to be legally created in 2005.

After some delays, the Bakossi National Park was created in 2007 and officially inaugurated early in 2008 by a decree signed by Prime Minister Ephraim Inoni and Minister of Forests Elvis Ngollengolle. The signature followed shortly after the December 2007 release of the film "The Mists of Mwanenguba", which documents the importance of conservation in the Bakossi mountains. The film was viewed by the Minister of Forests and the Paramount Chief of Bakossi in January 2008. Unusually for national parks in the region, the main justification was to conserve plant diversity.

Creation of the park resulted in an improvement of the funding level of the area by WWF Sweden in mid 2008. The WWF-CFP announced a strategy for introducing conservation-based income generating activities. This was handicapped by lack of organization and record-keeping in the local communities, inappropriate agricultural activities, lack of proper benefit sharing, gender insensitivity and other issues. Nevertheless, there were hopes that the Village Forest Management Committees would come to play an essential role in initiating and maintaining sustainable forestry management practices in the park as long as the needs of the villagers were respected.

A 2011 report noted that outstanding tasks included completing the establishment process, demarcating boundaries and finalizing the management plan. Eco-guards had to be recruited, trained and equipped, and the community educated in conservation and involved in ape surveys.

== Threats ==
The region is mainly inhabited by the Bakossi people but the population also includes Mbo, Manehas, Bakem, Baneka and immigrant Bamiliki people. In the last few decades there has been rapid growth in the human population. The indigenous people practice logging on a small scale, with the wood used for construction of homes and for making furniture, and harvest forest plants. This has minimal impact on the environment. They cultivate cocoa and coffee as cash crops and grow plantain, cocoyam, cassava, beans and pepper for their own consumption and for sale. Encroachment on wildlife habitats is a concern. Most of the people hunt for bushmeat, which is an important source of protein. A 2003 report said this activity had reached unsustainable levels and was putting large mammals at stake.

More than 200 of the plant species in the park at risk of extinction. Kew Gardens has worked with the community to help them understand the value of conservation. The local people have taken the lead in preserving the forest from illegal logging and clearance for farming. Traditional beliefs have played a part in helping preserve the ecosystem. Sacred forests and groves in the national park have significantly higher plant species diversity than in nearby Mount Cameroon. However, most of the people of the area are poor subsistence farmers. Falls in the price of their coffee and cocoa cash crops have caused them to increase use of nontimber forest products to earn money, creating huge pressure on the forest.

As of 2011 a project was being planned to convert over 70,000 hectares (270 sq mi) of unprotected land in the region into oil palm plantations. The project has been justified as providing a sustainable source of income for the people of the region. Concerns are that clearance of forests to make way for the plantations will seriously affect the livelihood of the local people who depend on forest products, and that a massive influx of low-paid plantation workers will result in a sharp and unsustainable rise in illegal logging and hunting in protected areas such as the Bakossi National Park. Conservation groups identified the Blackstone Group as one of the main investors in what they call the "Cameroon deforestation drive", which they say will be an ecological disaster In fact, the US-based Herakles Farms acquired 100% of Blackstone's SG Sustainable Oils affiliate in Cameroon, and Blackstone is no longer involved. Herakles Farms is moving forward with the project, which originally included 132 hectares (330 acres) of the national park itself. Herakles has said "the plantations will follow the highest environmental and social standards, complying fully with Roundtable on Sustainable Palm Oil (RSPO) Principles & Criteria".
