= Bakos =

Bakos and in Slovak the accented Bakoš are surnames.

Bakos and Bakoš may refer to:

== Places ==
- Bakos, Alexandria, a neighborhood in Alexandria, Egypt.

== People ==
=== Bakos ===
- Bernadett Bakos (born 1992), Hungarian politician
- Georgios Bakos (1892–1945), Greek Army officer
- György Bakos (born 1960), Hungarian hurdler
- Jenő Bakos (1929–1959), Hungarian middle-distance runner
- Jozef Bakos (1891–1977), American painter of Polish descent
- Károly Bakos (born 1943), Hungarian weightlifter
- Michael Bakos (born 1979), German ice hockey player
- Mihály Bakos, also known in Slovene as Miháo Bakoš or Mihael Bakoš, (c. 1742–1803), Hungarian Slovene Lutheran priest, author, and educator
- Nada Bakos, American former Central Intelligence Agency (CIA) analyst and targeting officer
- Pál Bakos (born 1932), Hungarian rower
- Szabolcs Bakos (born 1987), Hungarian footballer
- Yannis Bakos, American professor of business

=== Bakoš ===
- Juraj Bakoš (born 1960), Slovak ice hockey player
- Marek Bakoš (born 1983), Slovak footballer
- Martin Bakoš (born 1990), Slovak ice hockey player

== See also ==
- Bakossi (disambiguation)
