= Ardisia koupensis =

Conservation status
- Endangered (IUCN 3.1)

Scientific classification
- Kingdom: Plantae
- Clade: Tracheophytes
- Clade: Angiosperms
- Clade: Eudicots
- Clade: Asterids
- Order: Ericales
- Family: Primulaceae
- Genus: Ardisia
- Species: A. koupensis

Binomial name
- Ardisia koupensis Taton

Species of flowering plant

Ardisia koupensis is a species of plant in the family Primulaceae. It is endemic to Cameroon. Its natural habitat is subtropical or tropical moist lowland forests. It is threatened by habitat loss.

In 1979 a single specimen of Ardisia koupensis was collected from the western slopes of Mount Kupe, just above Mbule. Since then, two other locations have been found on the mountain above Kupe village. The plant, which grows in the understorey of mid-altitude to submontane closed canopy forest, was on the 2010 IUCN Red List of Threatened Species, classified as Endangered.
