= Bakosi cattle =

Breed of cattle

Bakosi cattle, also known as Bakuri or Kosi, are a Savannah Shorthorn breed of cattle in Cameroon maintained by the ethnic group Bakossi. They are found in the south-western mountains of Cameroon, west of the Nkongsamba on the border between the Southwest region and Littoral provinces. They are used for their meat, hides, payment of bride price and rituals. Their coats vary from black to white but more than half are brown or black. Their calving interval is between 18 and 24 months.
