= Epuli Aloh Mathias =

Chief Epuli Aloh Mathias is Paramount Chief of the Bakossis in the south-west region of Cameroon. His jurisdiction covers all the thirteen Bassossi villages. In addition, he is a judge in the Supreme Court of the Republic of Cameroon. As of 7 June 2017, the Higher Judicial Council headed by president Paul Biya nominated Chief Justice Epuli Aloh Mathias to preside the Judicial Bench of the Supreme Court of Cameroon. After graduating from the National School of Administration and Magistracy (ENAM), he steadily rose through the ranks of the judiciary, working in many jurisdictions in the country. Furthermore, he has worked in helping develop key legislature, providing an insight into the customs and traditions of legal practice and how they were harmonized with local laws in the former West Cameroon under British rule.

In governance, his main focus has been on increasing the literacy rate in Bassossi villages by building schools, improving access to quality healthcare by encouraging more Bassossis to undertake healthcare studies, and above all, vigorously promoting environmental conservation within Bassossi communities.

As of 2012, he has been holding a series of meetings to evaluate progress made in preventing poaching and illegal logging, an ongoing challenge in Bassossi land.

Justice Chief Epuli Aloh Mathias is fluent in spoken and written English and French. He also speaks a slew of local languages, including "Nsuase".
