= Elvis Ngolle Ngolle =

Cameroonian politician and professor

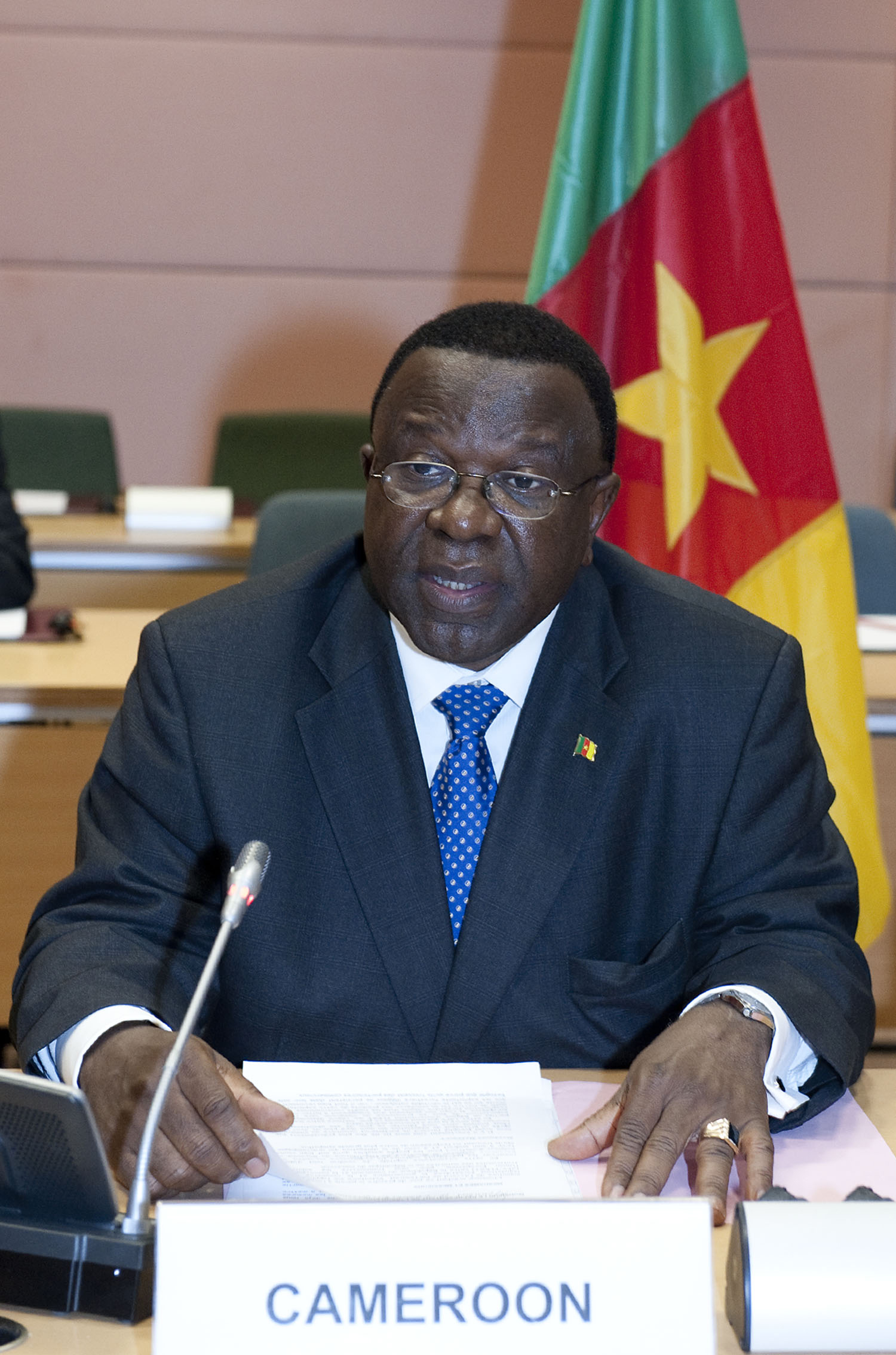
Elvis Ngolle Ngolle in 2010

Elvis Ngolle Ngolle (born 14 April 1953) is a Cameroonian politician and a professor, who lastly served in the government of Cameroon as Minister of Forestry and Wildlife. He had been a member of the government since 1997.

== Teaching career and early political activities ==
Ngolle Ngolle was born in kack, located in South West region. He is of Bakossi origin. He taught political science at the University of Denver in the United States from 1983 to 1985, and he subsequently taught at the University of Yaoundé's International Relations Institute of Cameroon (IRIC). He has been a resource person for the ruling Cameroon People's Democratic Movement (RDPC) since the early 1990s. He participated in the 1990 tripartite talks and subsequently participated in talks between the RDPC and the main opposition Social Democratic Front (SDF).

== Government service ==
Ngolle Ngolle was first appointed to the government as Minister of Special Duties at the Presidency of the Republic on 7 December 1997. Following the October 2004 presidential election, he defended President Paul Biya at the Supreme Court and argued against the petitions filed by members of the opposition; all of those petitions were dismissed. Speaking to The Post in July 2006, after Biya called an extraordinary RDPC congress, Ngolle Ngolle said that, because the RDPC was the ruling party, the health of the RDPC was indicative of the health of Cameroon as a whole. He also stressed that "power is seen as something that has a moral substance" in the RDPC and that "when you are in power and managing people, you must show exemplary conduct". According to Ngolle Ngolle, Biya's re-election as RDPC National President at the congress was almost a foregone conclusion due to what he described as Biya's impressive achievements; he credited Biya with introducing multiparty democracy as well as working with the opposition and thereby facilitating dialogue between political parties.

After nearly nine years as Minister of Special Duties, Ngolle Ngolle was promoted to the position of Minister of Forestry and Wildlife on 22 September 2006.

As Minister of Forestry and Wildlife, Ngolle Ngolle worked to enforce anti-poaching laws and curb the illegal sale of bushmeat. Although a law designed to protect endangered species from poaching was passed in 1994, it was not enforced until around 2004, and even afterward trade in illegal bushmeat remained quite widespread. Ngolle Ngolle complained in early 2010 that "we see people selling bushmeat everywhere, anywhere, in public places, along the roadsides. And it's more or less putting a shame on our dignity and our commitment to fight illegal poaching." At the same time, he discussed the introduction of a new government program to regulate the trade by allowing the sale of bushmeat only at specially designated places. At those places, bushmeat from relatively prolific species, such as cane rats, could be sold, but people selling meat from endangered species would be punished. Related government initiatives conducted by Ngolle Ngolle's ministry involved the recruitment of forest guards and providing bushmeat traders with work in the agricultural sector.
