= Mary Muyali Meboka =

Cameroonian politician (born 1961)

- Born: March 1961 (age 65); Tombel, Cameroon
- Citizenship: Cameroon
- Occupation: Politician
- Title: Vice President of the National Assembly
- Political party: Cameroon People's Democratic Movement

Mary Muyali Meboka (born March 1961) is a Cameroonian politician currently serving as a Deputy Speaker (Vice President) of the National Assembly of Cameroon. She is a member of the Cameroon People's Democratic Movement and has been a member of the National Assembly since 2007, representing the Ndian Division in the South-West Region.

== Biography ==
Meboka was born in March 1961 in Tombel, a commune and town in the Southwest Region of Cameroon, north of the Mungo Valley. She trained as an agricultural engineer at the University of Dschang and later obtained a Master of Science in Development Training and Education from the University of Wolverhampton in England.

Meboka worked with the Institute of Agricultural Research for Development in Ekona and the Korup Project, and served as Ndian Divisional Delegate for Environment and Protection of Nature, before entering the National Assembly.

== Politics ==
Meboka served as the Vice President of the Cameroon People's Democratic Movement Parliamentary Group from 2009 to 2022, when she was appointed to the National Assembly's bureau.

On March 18, 2022, during a plenary sitting, Meboka was elected as one of the Deputy Speakers of Cameroon's National Assembly.

Mary Meboka was described in an article in the Cameroon Tribune as a "pragmatic politician, balancing her party loyalty with a reputation for competence and professionalism."
