= William Serle =

William Serle OBE (29 July 1912 – 7 October 1992) was a Scottish ornithologist, doctor, and Church of Scotland minister.

== Biography ==
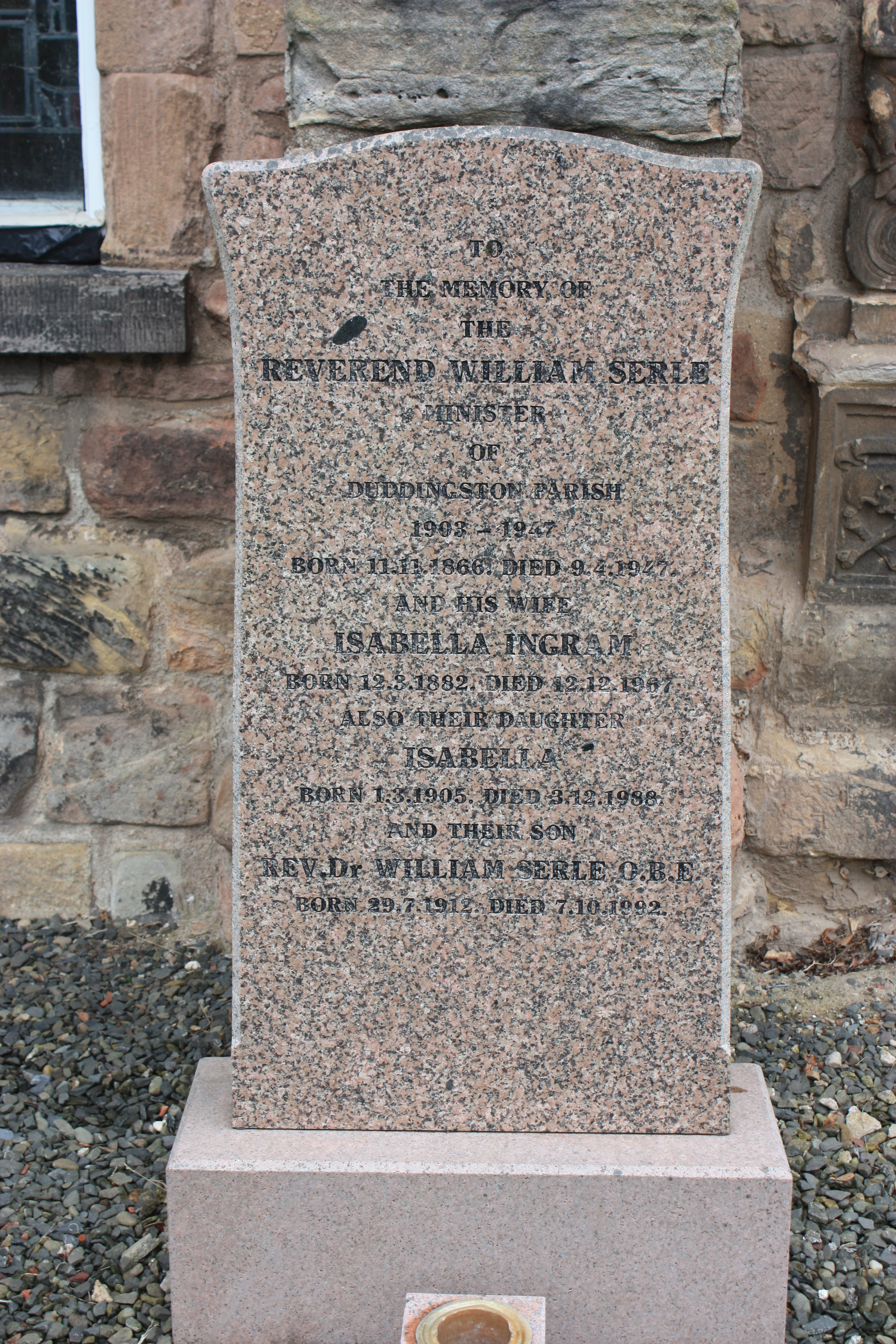
The grave of Rev Dr William Serle, Duddingston Kirkyard

Serle was born in Duddingston manse in Edinburgh in July 1912, the son of the Rev William Serle (1866-1947), minister of Duddingston Kirk, and his wife, Isabella Ingram.

He was a student at George Watson's Boys' College from 1918 to 1930. He then went to study medicine at the University of Edinburgh, graduating in 1935. He took a job as a doctor in the Colonial Service, and sailed to Nigeria in 1937. He lived in Nigeria and the Cameroons for the next 20 years. During World War II, Serle joined the West African Field Ambulance Corps, seeing active service in India and Burma. For his valorous service, he was mentioned in dispatches twice and made an Officer of the Order of the British Empire (OBE).

In 1956, Serle married Sheila Lawrie. They had five daughters and one son. In October 1957 Serle returned to the University of Edinburgh to study to become a minister. He was ordained in 1959 and made minister of Drumoak Church near Aberdeen, where he served for 28 years. Serle's health deteriorated in the mid-1980s, so he left Drumoak and retired at Ratho near Edinburgh, where he died on 7 October 1992. He is buried with his parents in Duddingston Kirkyard. The grave lies immediately south of the church.

Serle's father had an interest in birds, and was a member of the British Ornithologists' Union, so he may have picked up his interest in ornithology from his father. His first ornithological publication appeared in the Scottish Naturalist when he was only 18. Over his lifetime he published a total of 65 scientific articles or books on ornithology, of which about sixty dealt with African birds. His best-known work is the 1977 The Collins Field Guide to the Birds of West Africa, which he coauthored with G. J. Morel and which was illustrated by Wolfgang Hartwig. In addition to writing, Serle was a very active collector. He amassed a collection of about 10,000 study skins, as well as numerous eggs and nests. His collections of thousands of eggs and nests are now at the National Museum of Scotland (which also has his father's collection) along with detailed notes connected to them. Most of his study skins are at the Natural History Museum at Tring, and 500 are in the National Museum of Scotland. Serle named two species, the white-throated mountain babbler (Kupeornis gilberti) and Mount Kupe bushshrike (Telophorus kupeensis). James Chapin named a subspecies of Xavier's greenbul, Phyllastrephus xavieri serlei, in his honour.

Through his efforts, Serle greatly expanded the understanding of the birds of western Africa. Later in his life, he was unconvinced that ecological and ethological studies of birds were of great value. Writing in the Ibis after Serle's death, A. G. Marshall said that Serle was "a man somewhat out of his time, a Victorian naturalist and cleric," but that Serle's work was valuable because when he arrived in western Africa, extensive collecting and meticulous taxonomic work still "was vitally needed."
