= Bakossi Forest Reserve =

Coordinates: 4°44′34″N 9°35′20″E

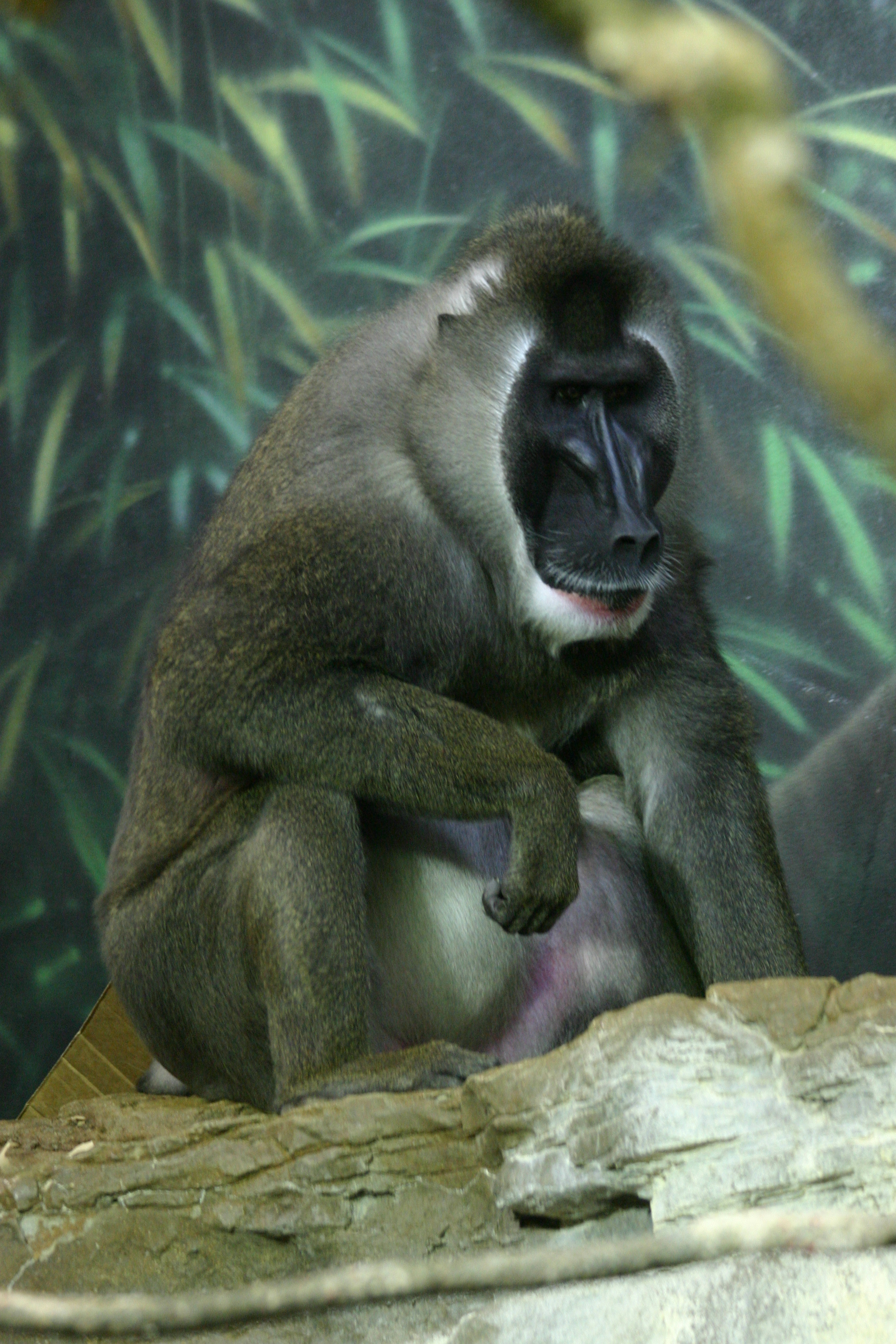
Drill in Lincoln Park Zoo.

The Bakossi Forest Reserve is a 5,517 square kilometres (2,130 sq mi) reserve within the Bakossi Mountains in Cameroon, home to many rare species of plants, animals and birds. The Forest Reserve in turn contains the Bakossi National Park, created by a decree in early 2008. The park covers 29,320 hectares (72,500 acres), and was justified on the basis of preserving plant diversification.

The Bakossi Mountains, which include Mount Kupe, cover in total about 230,000 square kilometres (89,000 sq mi), with perhaps the largest area of cloud forest in West-Central Africa. They are part of a larger tract of forest that extends northward into the western foothills of the Bamboutos Mountains. The reserve was created in 1956. In 2000, the main section of the reserve was designated a protection forest. All logging was banned and Kupe became a "strict nature reserve". The local Bakossi people participated in delineating the boundaries. Between 2003 and 2007, the effectiveness of management in this and other parks improved greatly, although the local people were not well integrated into the system, and lacked education and awareness of environmental goals.

The red ironwood tree (Lophira alata), known locally as the azobé, is endemic to the forest, and has suffered greatly because of illegal logging.

The mountains have one of the healthiest remaining populations of the endangered drill, a primate related to the mandrill. The drill population in Bakossiland has been threatened by hunters in the area. Drills became extinct in the late 1970s in the Loum Forest Reserve, and may be extinct on Mount Mwanenguba. However, since 1994, on Mount Kupe the drill population has started to recover due to protection from the Bakossi traditional chiefs. Other primates are Preuss's monkey, red-eared guenon, greater spot-nosed monkey and several species of bush baby, collared mangabey, chimpanzee and Preuss's red colobus. Some of the species of chameleon are thought to be found only in the region. The area has many species of bird. On Mount Kupe alone, more than 329 species have been recorded. These include the Mount Kupe bushshrike, the endangered white-throated mountain babbler, and the vulnerable green-breasted bushshrike and grey-necked picathartes.
