= Simon Munzu =

Cameroonian politician (born 1949)

Simon Munzu (born 1949, Nguti (Kupe-Manenguba)-Cameroon) was the United Nations Secretary-General's Deputy Special Representative for Côte d'Ivoire from October 2014 to August 2016. Prior to this appointment of 7 October 2014 by United Nations Secretary-General Ban Ki-moon, Munzu served the United Nations in various capacities.

== Biographical Information ==
Munzu has extensive experience in political affairs, human rights, law, academia and management. Munzu joined the United Nations in 1995 as a volunteer after working for more than thirteen years in academia. He has held several high-level positions with the United Nations including Acting Head of the United Nations Human Rights Field Operation in Rwanda, Senior Policy Adviser with the United Nations Development Programme, Representative of the United Nations High Commissioner for Human Rights in Côte d'Ivoire and Director of Political Affairs in the United Nations Stabilization Mission in the Democratic Republic of the Congo.

== Education ==
He attended St Joseph College Sasse, where he obtained his GCE Ordinary Level. At age 19, he attended Cameroon College of Arts, Science and Technology (CCAST) in Bambili (October 1968 to June 1970). Due to his brilliant performance in the General Certificate of Education Examination (GCE) Ordinary and GCE Advance Levels, he was awarded a government scholarship to study in England. Munzu holds a doctorate degree in law from the University of CambridgeMaster of Laws (LL.M.) degree from the University of London; and law degree from University of London He has been a member of the Bar in England since 1973.

One of the Founders of the 1996 Constitution of Cameroon:

As National Secretary for Economic and Social Affairs in the National Secretariat of the CPDM Central Committee, he took part in the deliberations of Tripartite Conference convened by President Biya in Yaoundé from 30 October to 18 November 1991. He was selected by the Tripartite Conference made up of an 11-member Technical Committee Drafting of the Constitution of Cameroon, made up of seven Francophones and four Anglophones and chaired by Professor Joseph Owona. As a CPDM member of the technical Committee in charge in drafting the constitution of Cameroon, Dr Munzu strongly advocated the return of the country to a federal system of government because he sincerely believed that such a system would be the best framework for recognizing, upholding and protecting the Anglophone identity and giving Anglophones their full rights as citizens of this country. In April 1993, he convened the first All Anglophone Conference (AAC) in Buea. The purpose of convening was for Anglophones to arrive at a common set of proposals for asserting and safeguarding Anglophone interests, to be submitted and defended at the impending national constitutional talks announced for March 1993, by the President. The AAC was massively attended, hugely representative and immensely successful and the federalism was adopted as the form of the state to be proposed by Anglophones at the announced national constitutional forum.
