= Koupé-Manengouba =

Division in Southwest Region, Cameroon

Koupé-Manengouba Kupenguba
- Department
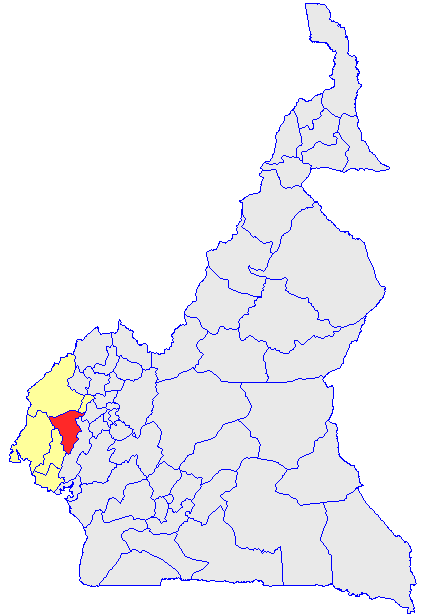
- Department location in Cameroon

- Location within Cameroon Location within Africa
- Country: Cameroon
- Province: Southwest Province
- Capital: Bangem

Area
  - Total: 3,404 km^{2} (1,314 sq mi)

Population (2005)
  - Total: 105,579
  - Density: 31.02/km^{2} (80.33/sq mi)
- Time zone: UTC+1 (WAT)

Kupenguba, derived from Mount Koupé in the south and Mount Manengouba in the North, is a division of the Southwest Region in Cameroon. The division covers an area of 3,404 km^{2} and in 2005 had a total population of 105,579. The capital of the division is Bangem. The County was named after the Kupe and Mwanenguba mountain located its South and North, respectively. It is home to the Mbo, Bakossi and Bassosi tribes.

== Subdivisions ==
The Koupé-Manengouba Division is divided administratively into 4 subdivisions and in turn into sub-districts and villages.

=== Subdivisions ===
- Mbemboland:
1. Melong
2. Santchou
3. Kékem

| District | Capital | Area (km^{2}) |
|---|---|---|
| Bangem | Bangem | 572.5 |
| Tombel | Tombel | 1,027 |
| Nguti | Nguti | 1,851 |
