= Nguti =

Nguti Town Bebum
- Mbo, Bakossi, Bayangi, Boyo, Basossi
- Location within Cameroon
- Coordinates: 5°19′N 9°25′E
- Country: Cameroon
- Region: South-West
- Department: Kupe-Manenguba

Area
  - Total: 1,444 km^{2} (558 sq mi)
- Elevation: 1,289 m (4,229 ft)

Population (2006)
  - Total: 27,151
- Time zone: UTC+1 (WAT)

Nguti is a town and commune in Cameroon. The town covers an area of 1.851 km^{2}. Nguti once had an airstrip, used for the transport of medicine and equipment, but is no longer in use. Nguti is nestled in Kupe Muanenguba Division, Southwest Region of Cameroon. Nguti is a Sub Divisional headquarter comprising 54 villages and four principal ethnic groups; the Mbo, Belong, Bassosi and Bakossi.

== Geography ==
The commune extends over the northern part of the department of Koupé-Manengouba, it borders eight Cameroonian communes: Mamfé, Tinto, Fontem, Santchou, Melong, Bangem, Konye.

== People ==
During the 2005 census, the commune had 27151 inhabitants, with 4560 living in the main town (Nguti town).

== Notable People of Nguti ==
- Nzo Ekangaki (Former SG OAU)
- Hon. Chief Justice Asu Mbanda
- Dr. Simon A. Munzu (fmr. Ass. U.N Sec Gen)
- Dr. Mbu Etonga
- Dr. Bernard Nzo-Nguty
- Mr. Emmanuel Njang
- Ndor Johnson Okie
- Chief Justice Epuli
- Roman Oben
- Mr. Osohmboh Mbu
- Dr. Elombi George (Executive Vice President AFREXIMBANK)
- Mr. Emmanuel Ayompe
- Mr. Jackson Kepe
- Mr. Theophile Njang
- Mr. Peter Esapa
