= Banyang-Mbo Wildlife Sanctuary =

Protected area in Cameroon

- IUCN category IV (habitat/species management area)
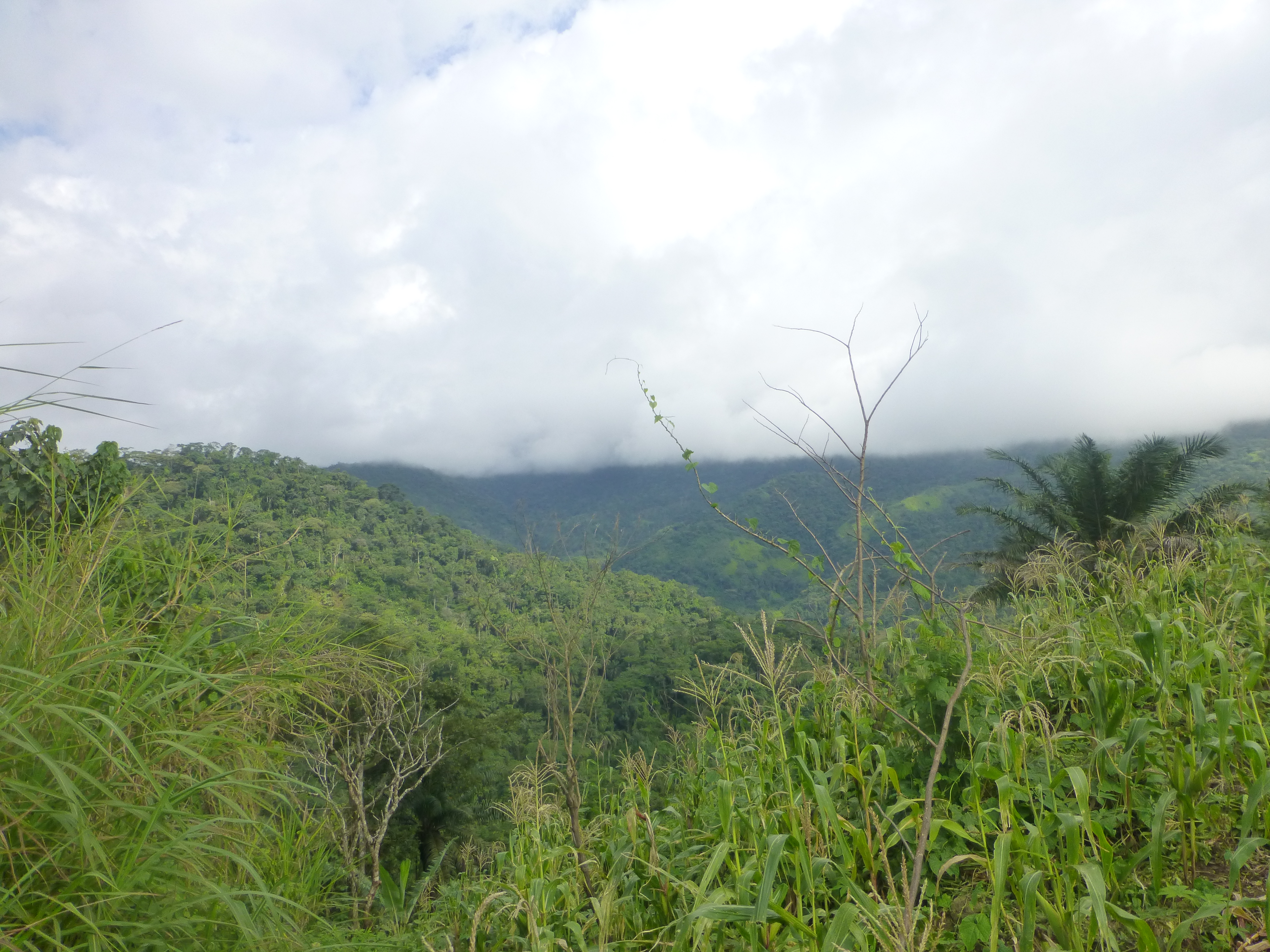
- A wide view of Mbayang Mbo Wildlife Sanctuary landscape

- Location within Cameroon
- Location: Cameroon
- Coordinates: 5°25′N 9°35′E
- Area: 691.45 square kilometres (266.97 sq mi)
- Established: 1996

The Banyang-Mbo Wildlife Sanctuary is a wildlife sanctuary found in Cameroon. It was established in 1996. This site is 691.45 km^{2}.

== Fauna ==
Recent surveys suggest that the 680-km^{2} Banyang-Mbo Wildlife Sanctuary provides habitat to possibly the largest population of chimpanzee remaining in this region and the last remaining sizeable population of forest elephants. In fact, it is estimated that 500-1000 Nigeria-Cameroon chimpanzees (Pan troglodytes ellioti) live in the sanctuary, and there are only 3500–9000 in the entire world. Due to this great abundance of animals the area has been set aside as a wildlife sanctuary, with a ban on all hunting.

== Conservation ==
The Mbo and Banyangi people live in and around the Banyang-Mbo Wildlife Sanctuary. The maintain the right to use the forest and its natural resources, although they must not compromise the conservation goals of the protected area. They hunt for bushmeat, which they sell fresh or smoked, and which is a good deal cheaper than other forms of protein.

Despite the uniqueness of this area, and the fact that all animals are "protected" by law in the park, the sanctuary has been little developed and both conservation and protection efforts have largely failed. In fact, the Banyang-Mbo sanctuary suffers from well organized commercial poaching, where professional hunters come into the area, kill animals and transport the meat to large cities to be sold. This illegal hunting combined with habitat degradation is a major problem in the Banyang-Mbo Wildlife Sanctuary.

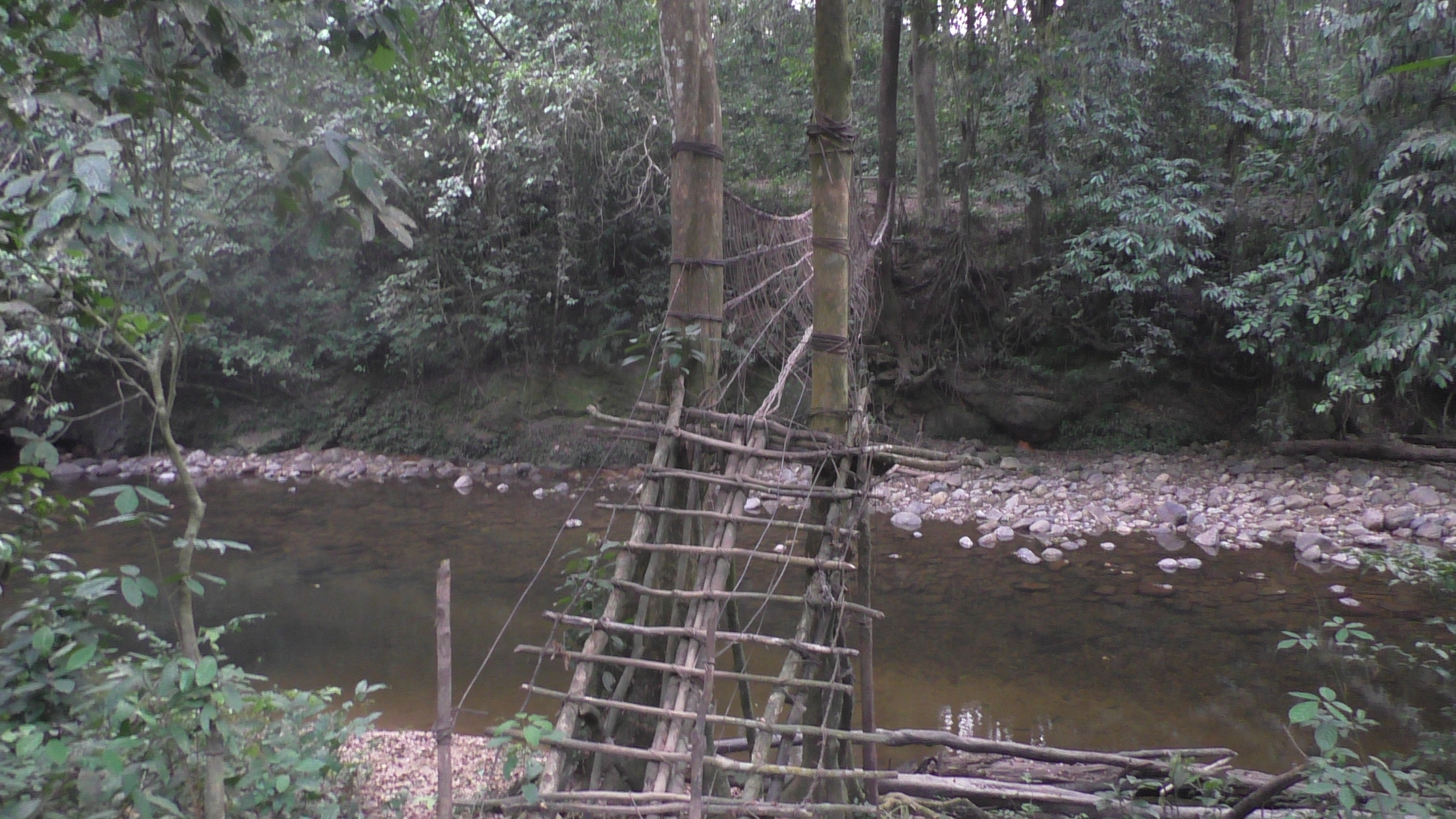
A cross bridge in the Mbayang Mbo Wildlife Sanctuary

The conservation efforts have failed in the past due to a lack of funding, enforcement of regulations, staffing, interest, long-term commitment etc. However, recently the sanctuary has been highlighted as one of the most important areas for chimpanzee conservation in the area, which could imply that further development of the conservation effort is approaching. However, in the meantime, it is important for the local communities to respect the regulations of the sanctuary in order to preserve it. Without local effort, this sanctuary is sure to become so degraded that it will no longer require protection and will no longer be listed as a protected area.

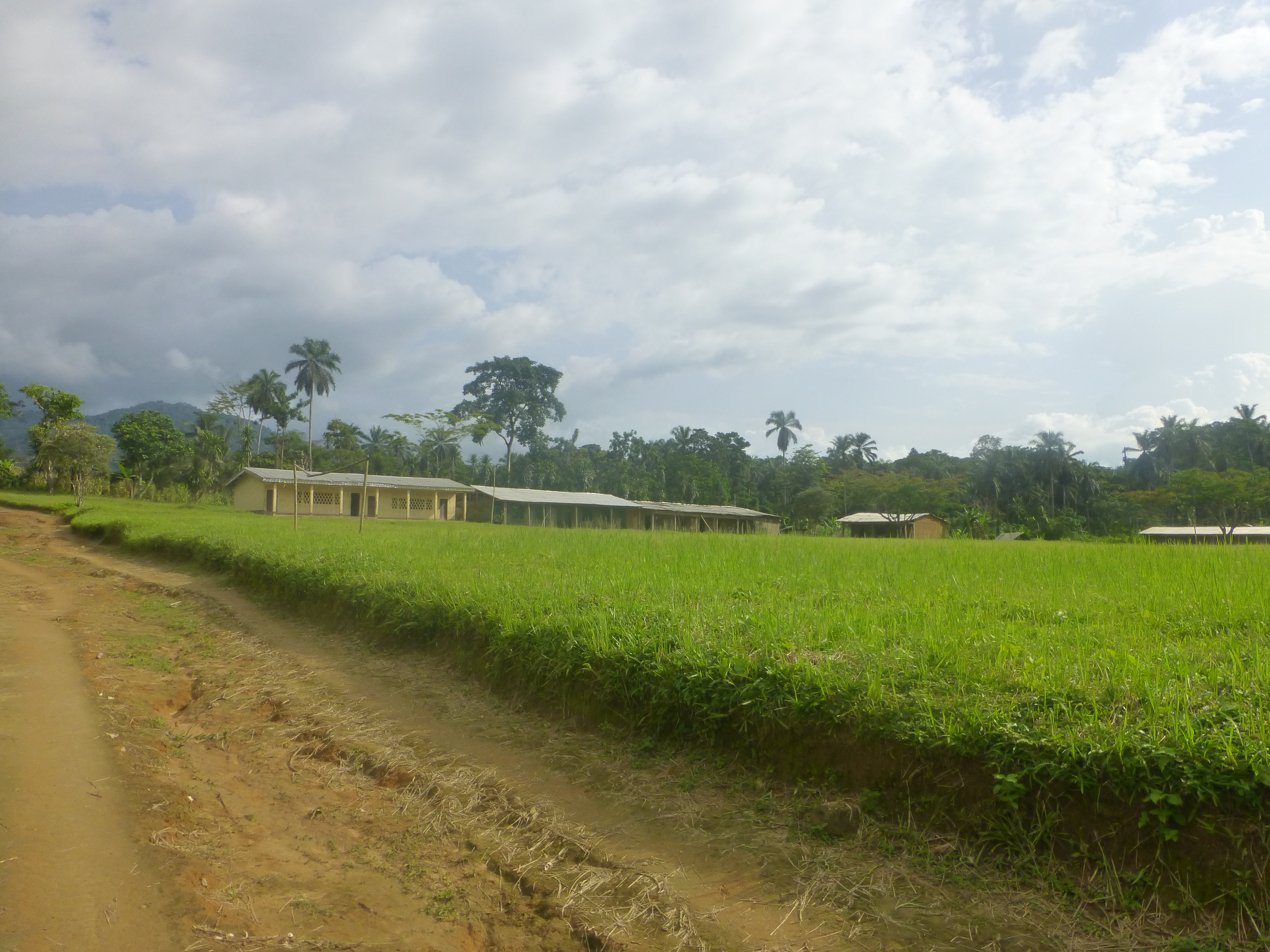
A school in Njunuye, a village around Mbayang Mbo Wildlife Sanctuary

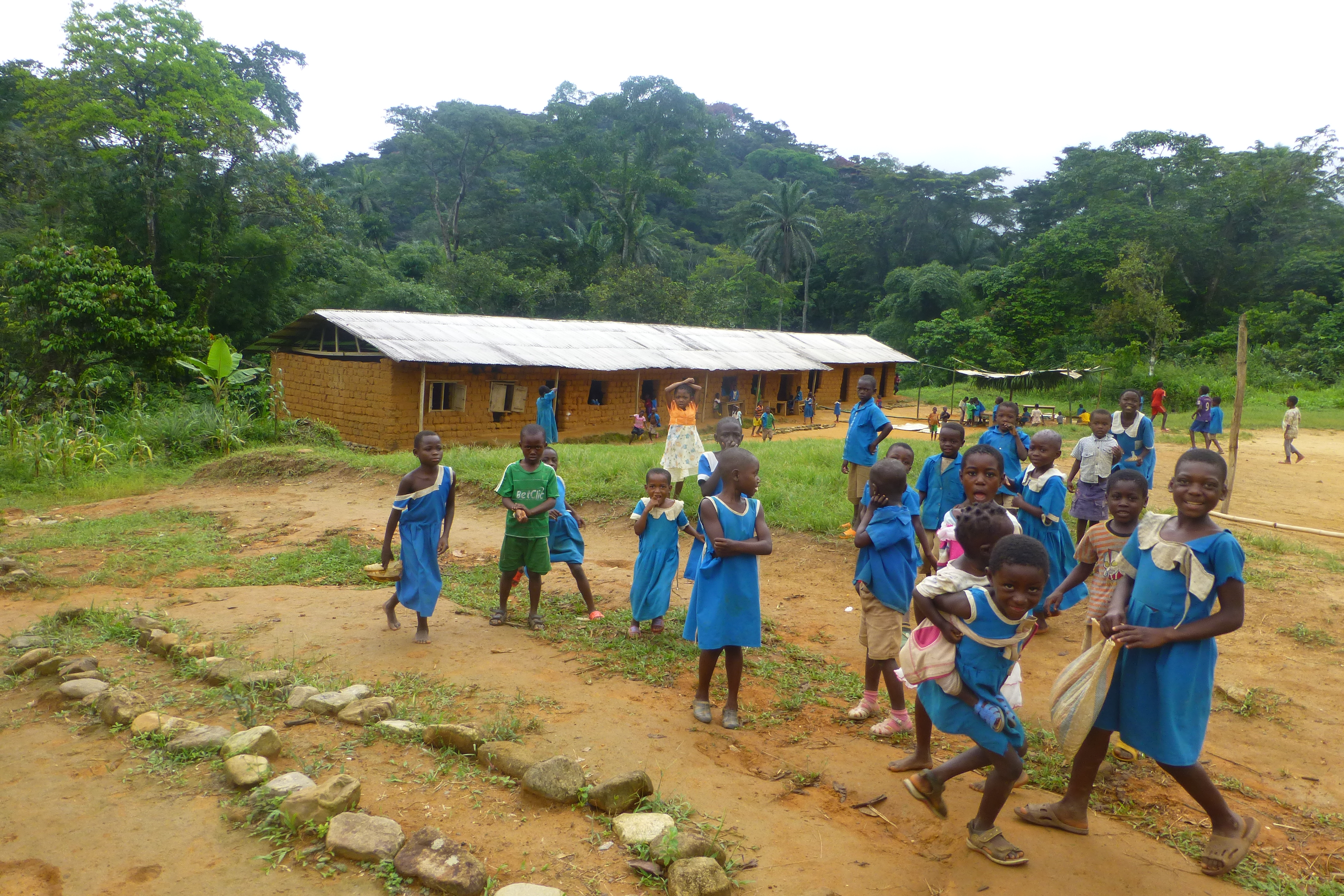
A school in Lebe, a village around the Mbayang Mbo Wildlife Sanctuary

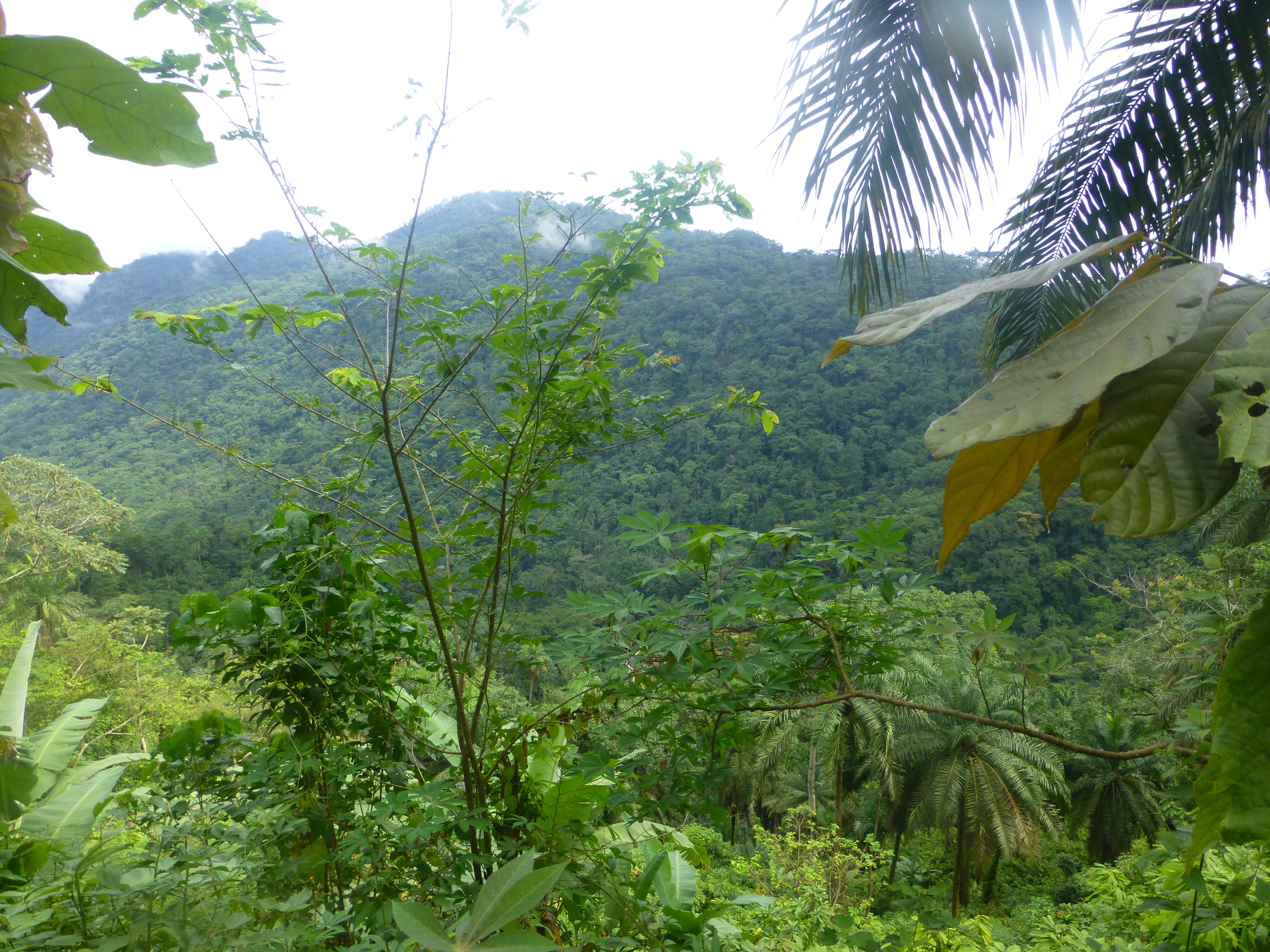
A view of Mbayang Mbo Wildlife Sanctuary landscape

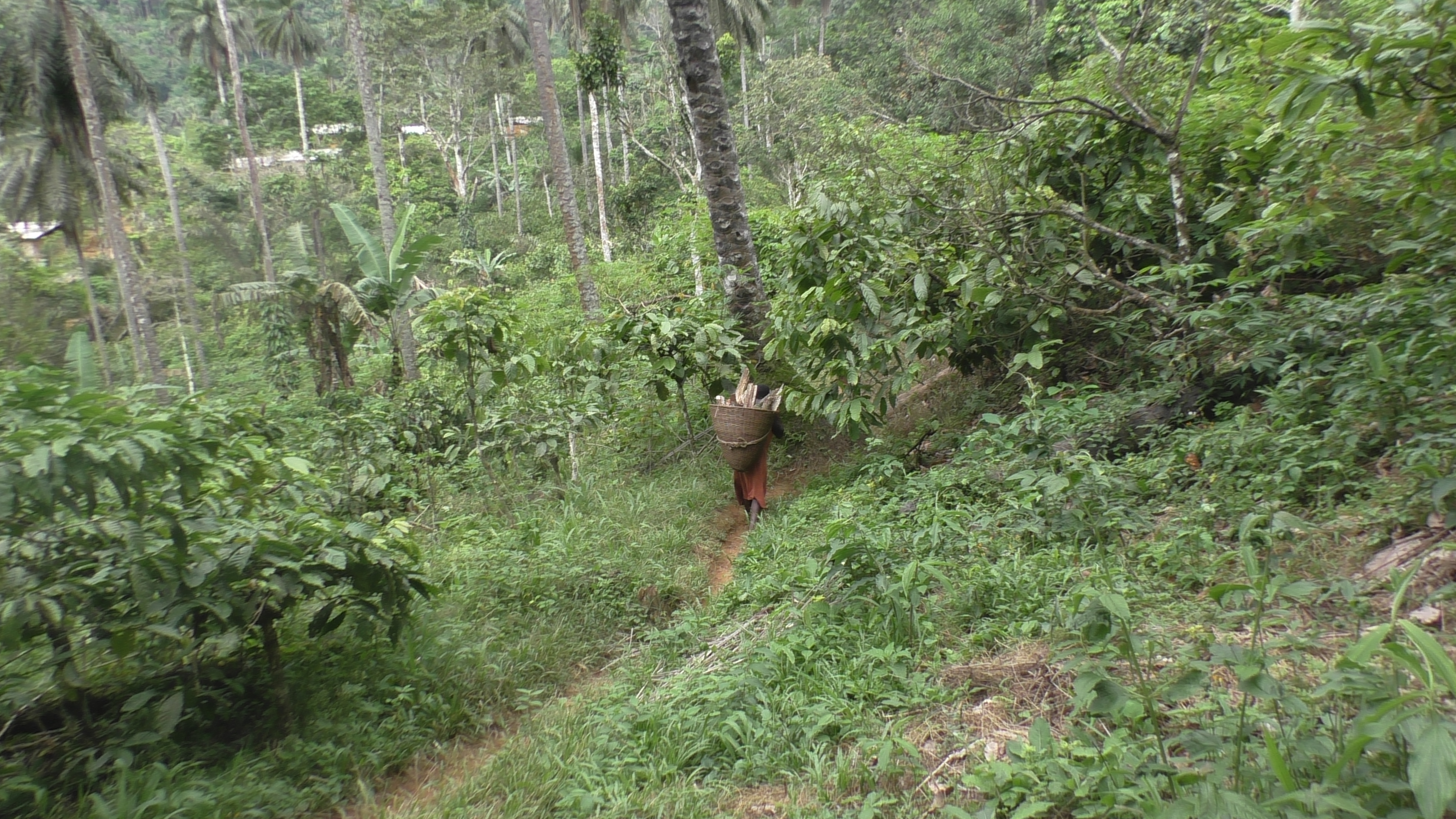
Agricultural activities in the Mbayang Mbo Wildlife Sanctuary

Gallery

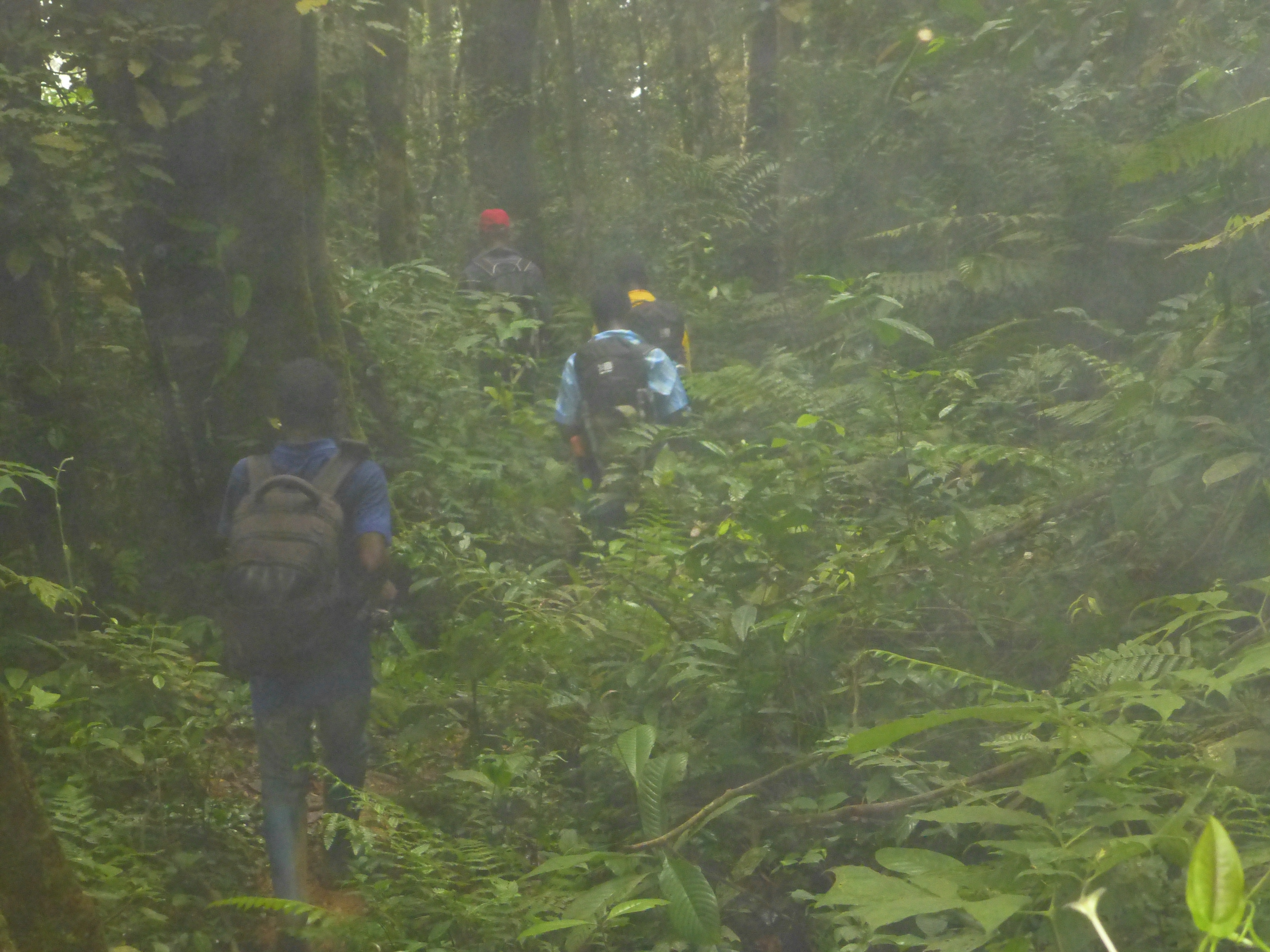
Narrow pathway in the wildlife sanctuary

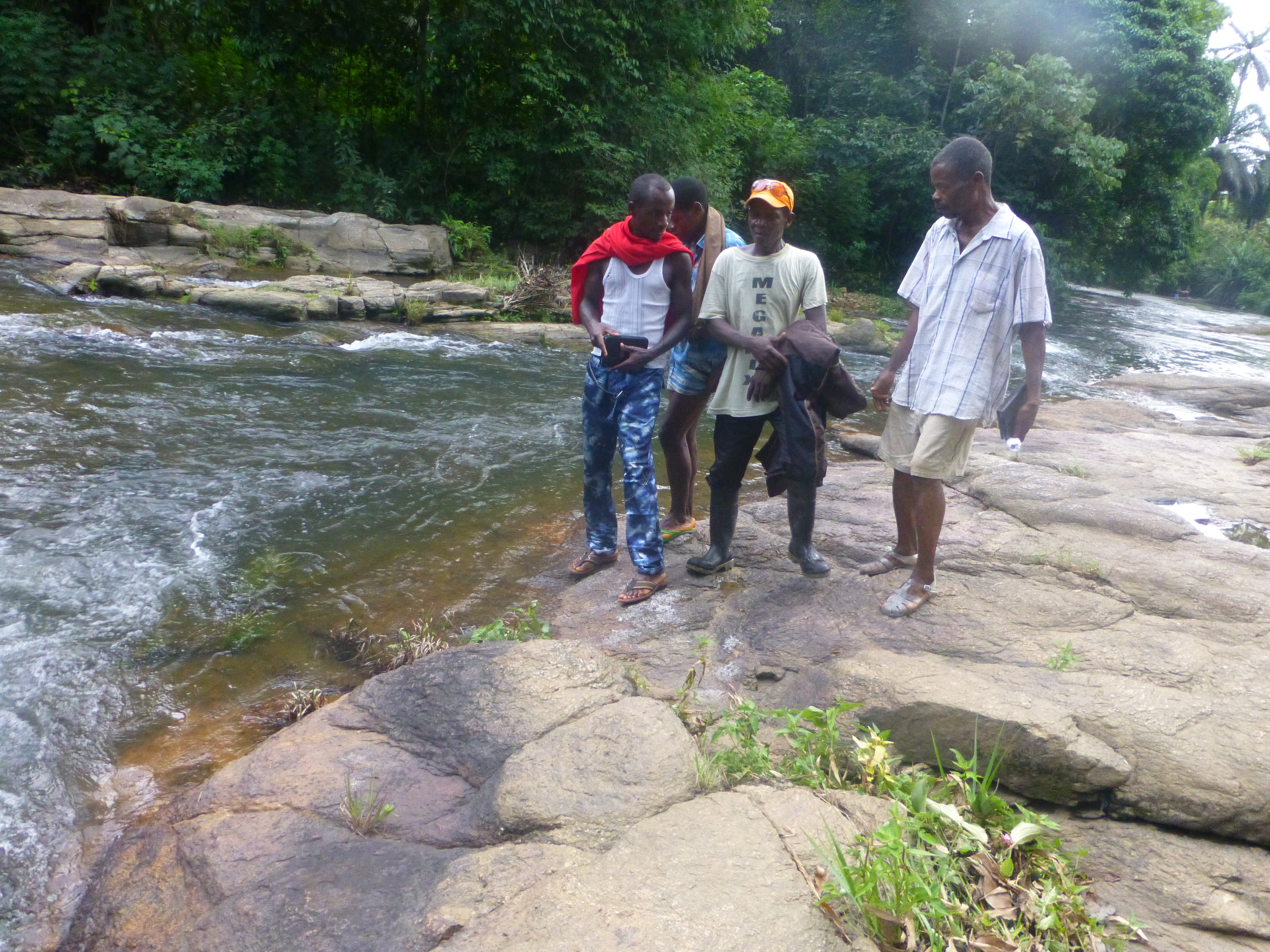
View of a river in the wildlife sanctuary

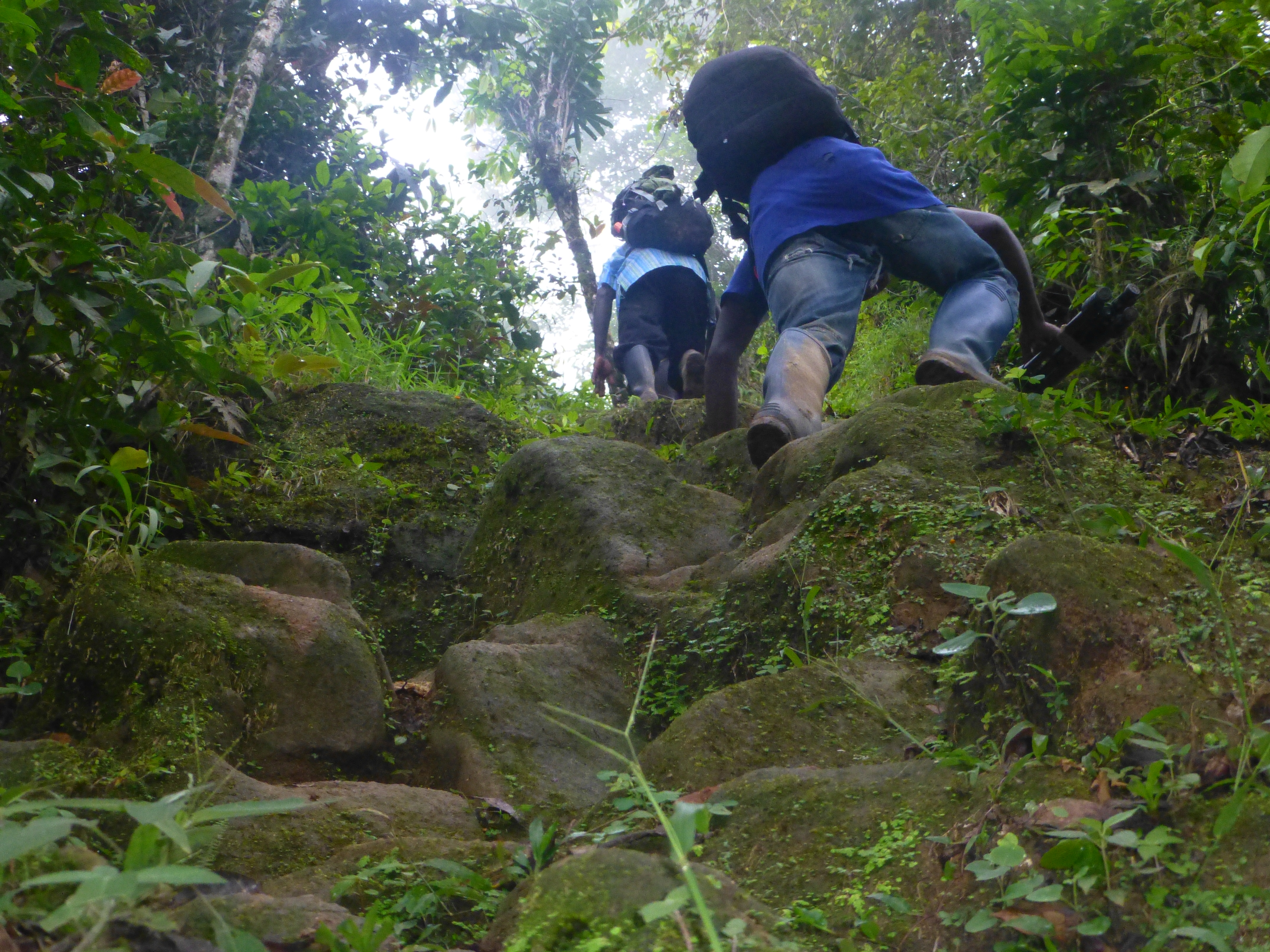
A steep footpath in the wildlife sanctuary

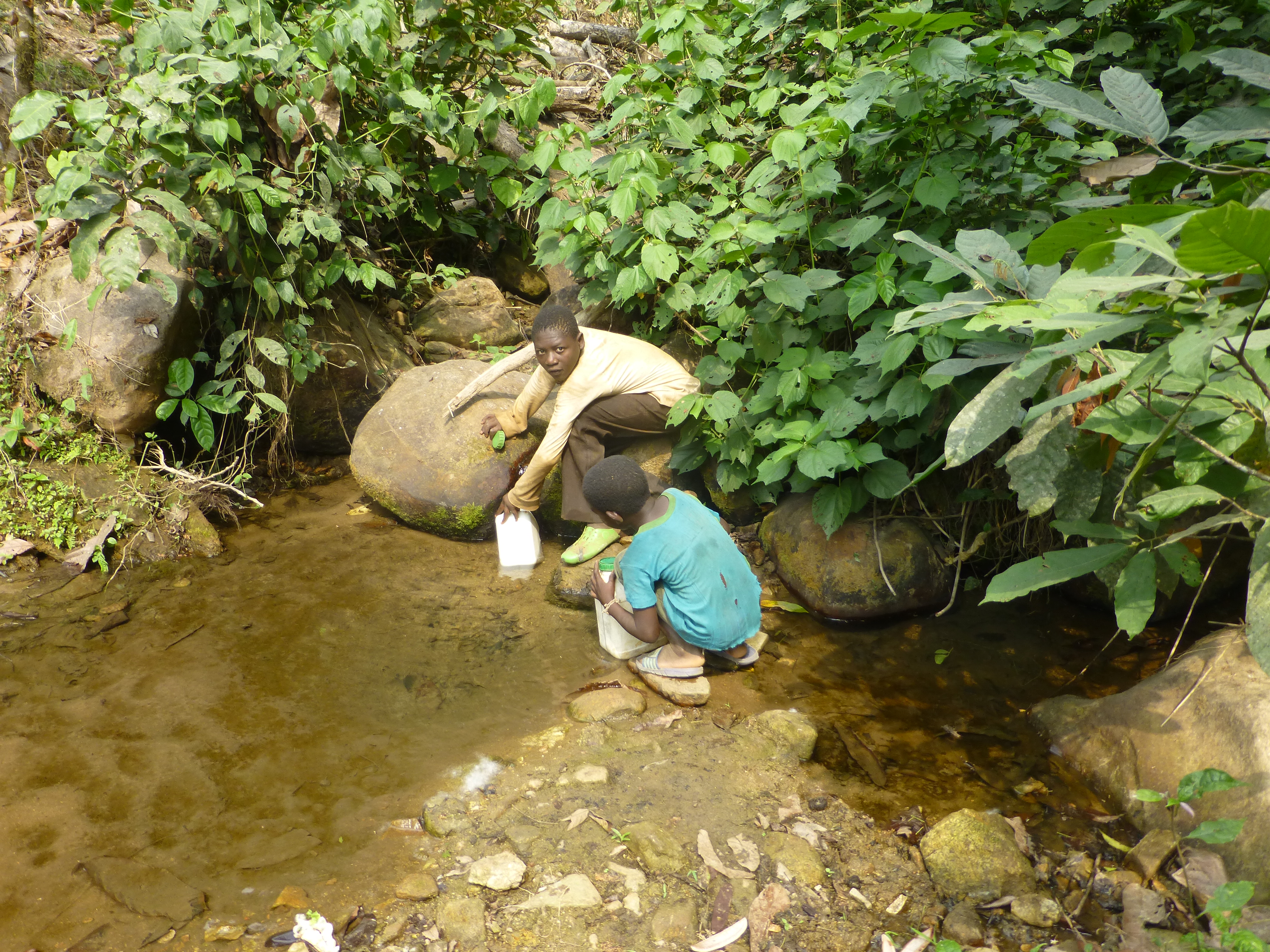
Drinking water point in the wildlife sanctuary

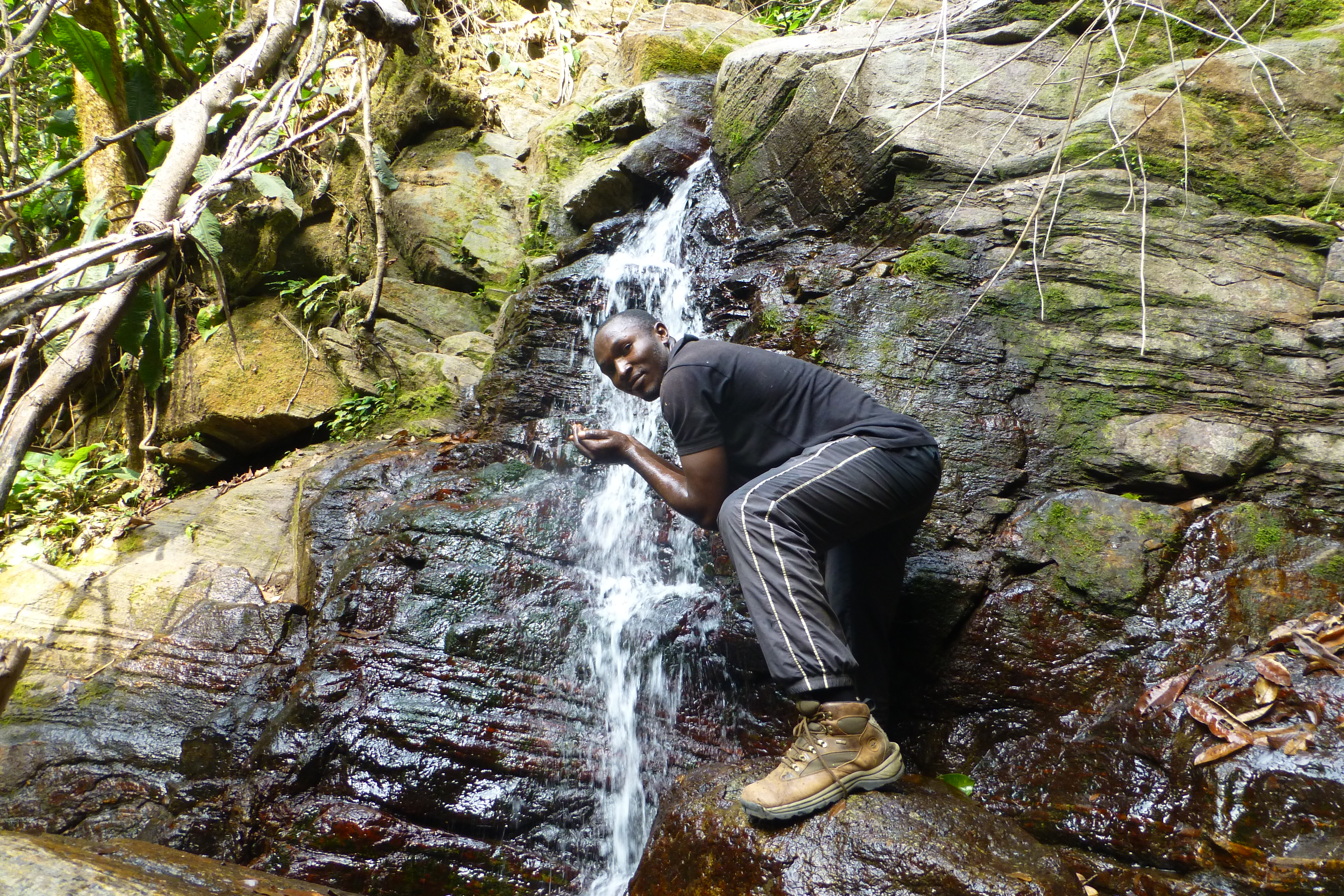
A man at a drinking water site in the wildlife sanctuary

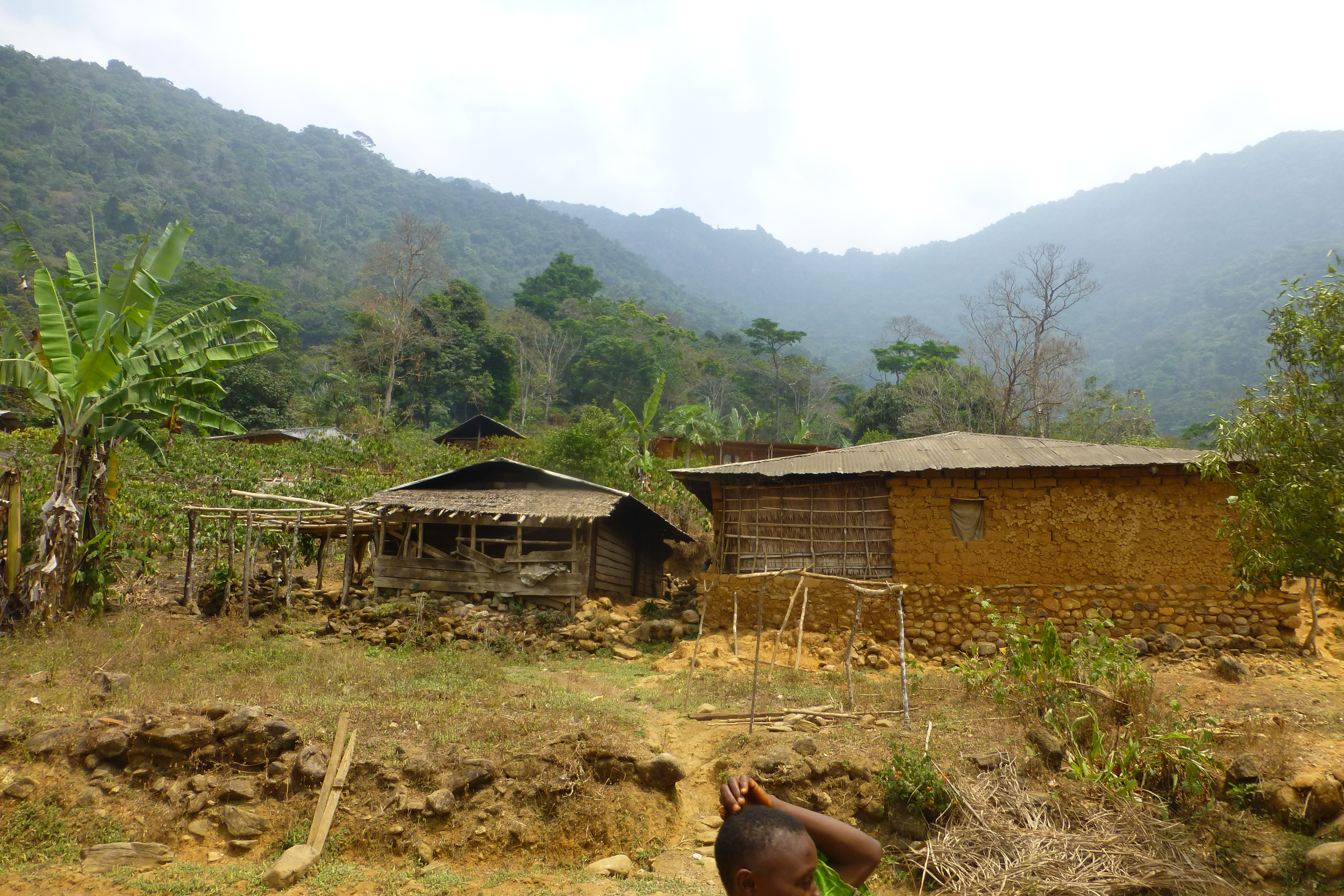
Extended view of the wildlife sanctuary from Lebe Village

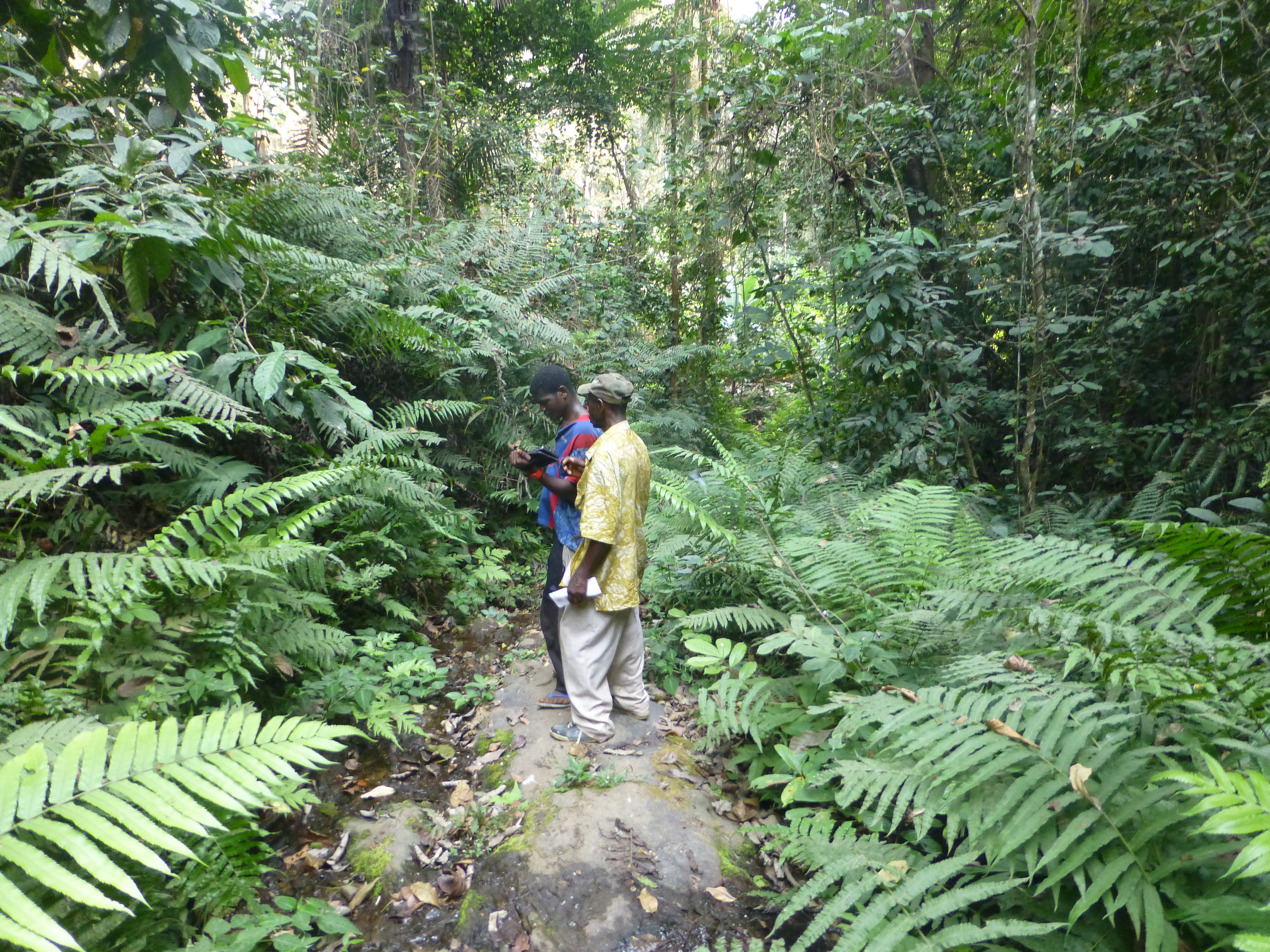
People at the core of the Sanctuary

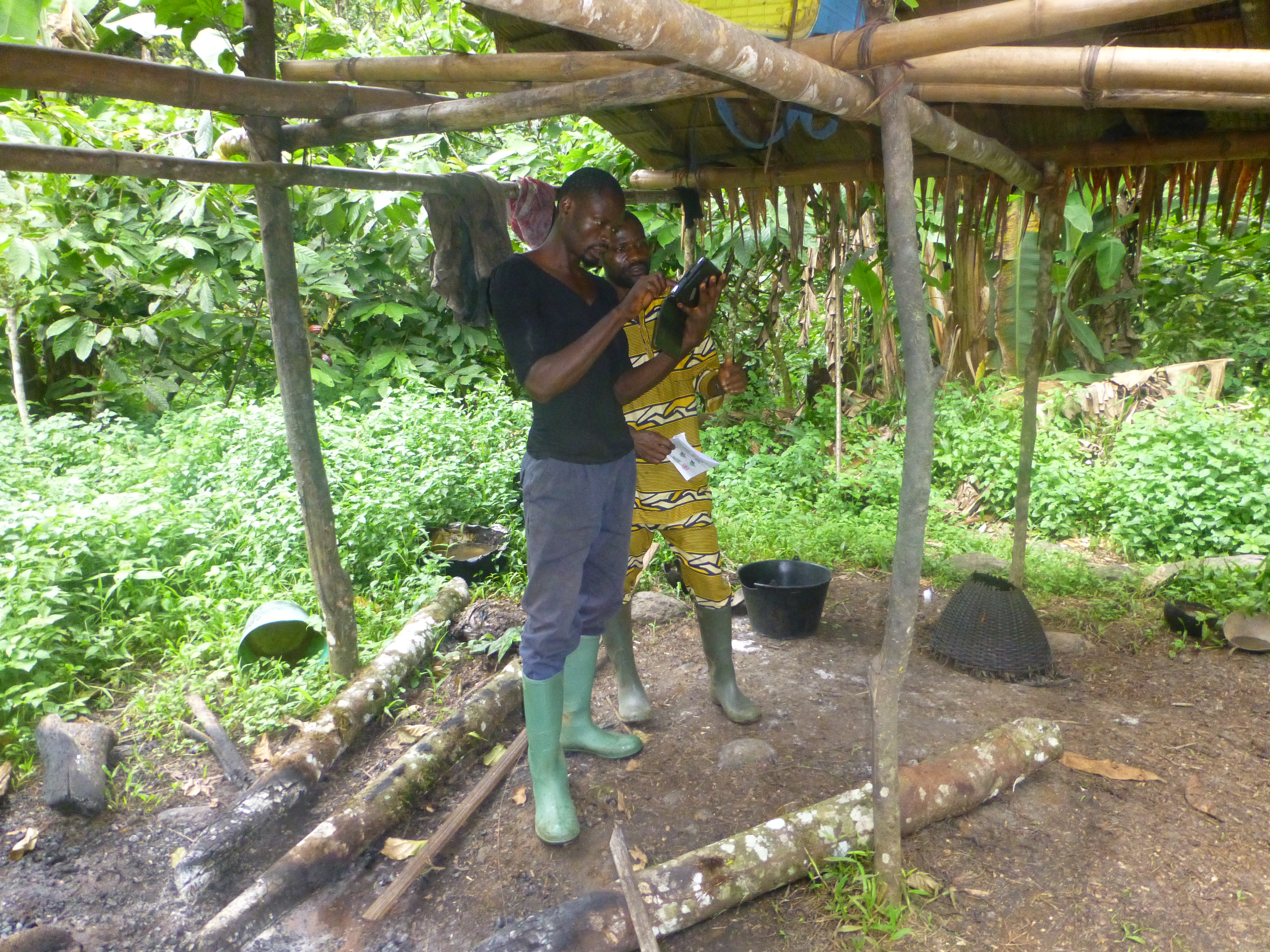
Camping House at the Sanctuary
