= Bakossi Mountains =

Mountain range in Cameroon

- Location within Cameroon

Highest point
- Peak: Mount Kupe
- Elevation: 2,064 m (6,772 ft)

Geography
- Location: Cameroon
- Regions: Littoral and Southwest
- Range coordinates: 4°48′05″N 9°42′29″E
- Parent range: Cameroon line

The Bakossi Mountains form a mountain range in Cameroon. They are home to the Bakossi people.

== Geography ==
The range forms part of the Cameroon line of active and extinct volcanoes in western Cameroon, covering about 230,000 square kilometres (89,000 sq mi). They lie in the regions of Littoral and the Southwest. The highest peak is Mount Kupe at 2,064 metres (6,772 ft). They contain a large area of cloud forest, and have considerable ecological interest. The climate is tropical, with rainfall throughout the year. The drier season lasts from November to March, with cold nights and hot days. The rainy season starts in April and peaks between late August and the end of October. The soil is fertile, supporting coffee and cocoa as cash crops.

=== Wildlife ===
A 60,000 ha site, encompassing the national park and the reserve, has been designated an Important Bird Area (IBA) by BirdLife International because it supports significant populations of many bird species. The area once contained an important population of drills; however, hunting of the species occurs and the status of the population is uncertain. Other notable mammals include Preuss's monkey and the giant otter shrew. The endemic frog Leptodactylodon wildi was only discovered in 1998.

== History ==
The mountains hold the Bakossi Forest Reserve, a 5,517 square kilometres (2,130 sq mi) reserve created in 1956. In 2000, the main section of the reserve was designated a protection forest. All logging was banned and Kupe became a "strict nature reserve". The local Bakossi people participated in delineating the boundaries. The Forest Reserve in turn contains the Bakossi National Park, created by a decree in early 2008. The park covers 29,320 hectares (72,500 acres), and was justified on the basis of preserving plant diversification.
