= John Ebong Ngole =

Cameroonian governor, and minister (1940–2020)

- Born: 11 January 1940; Enyandong, [
- Died: 2 July 2020 (aged 80); Yaoundé, Cameroon
- Occupation: Politician

John Ebong Ngole (11 January 1940 – 2 July 2020) was a Cameroonian prefect, governor, and minister.
