= Mount Kupe bushshrike =

Conservation status
- Endangered (IUCN 3.1)

Scientific classification
- Kingdom: Animalia
- Phylum: Chordata
- Class: Aves
- Order: Passeriformes
- Family: Malaconotidae
- Genus: Chlorophoneus
- Species: C. kupeensis

Binomial name
- Chlorophoneus kupeensis Serle, 1951

Synonyms
- Telophorus kupeensis Malaconotus kupeensis

Species of bird

The Mount Kupe bushshrike (Chlorophoneus kupeensis) is a species of bird in the family Malaconotidae. It was previously thought to be endemic to Cameroon, where it is found in the Bakossi Forest Reserve and in particular on Mount Kupe, where it has been known to attract ecotourists. In 2011 it was reported to be present in two sites in south east Nigeria.

== Distribution ==
Its natural habitat is subtropical or tropical moist montane forests. It is threatened by habitat loss.

== Description ==
It can be identified by its black mask, white throat, grey breast, grey belly, yellow vent, olive-green back, grey feet, black bill, and white supercilium. Some have a black or dark maroon collar. It is generally perceived as difficult to spot.
