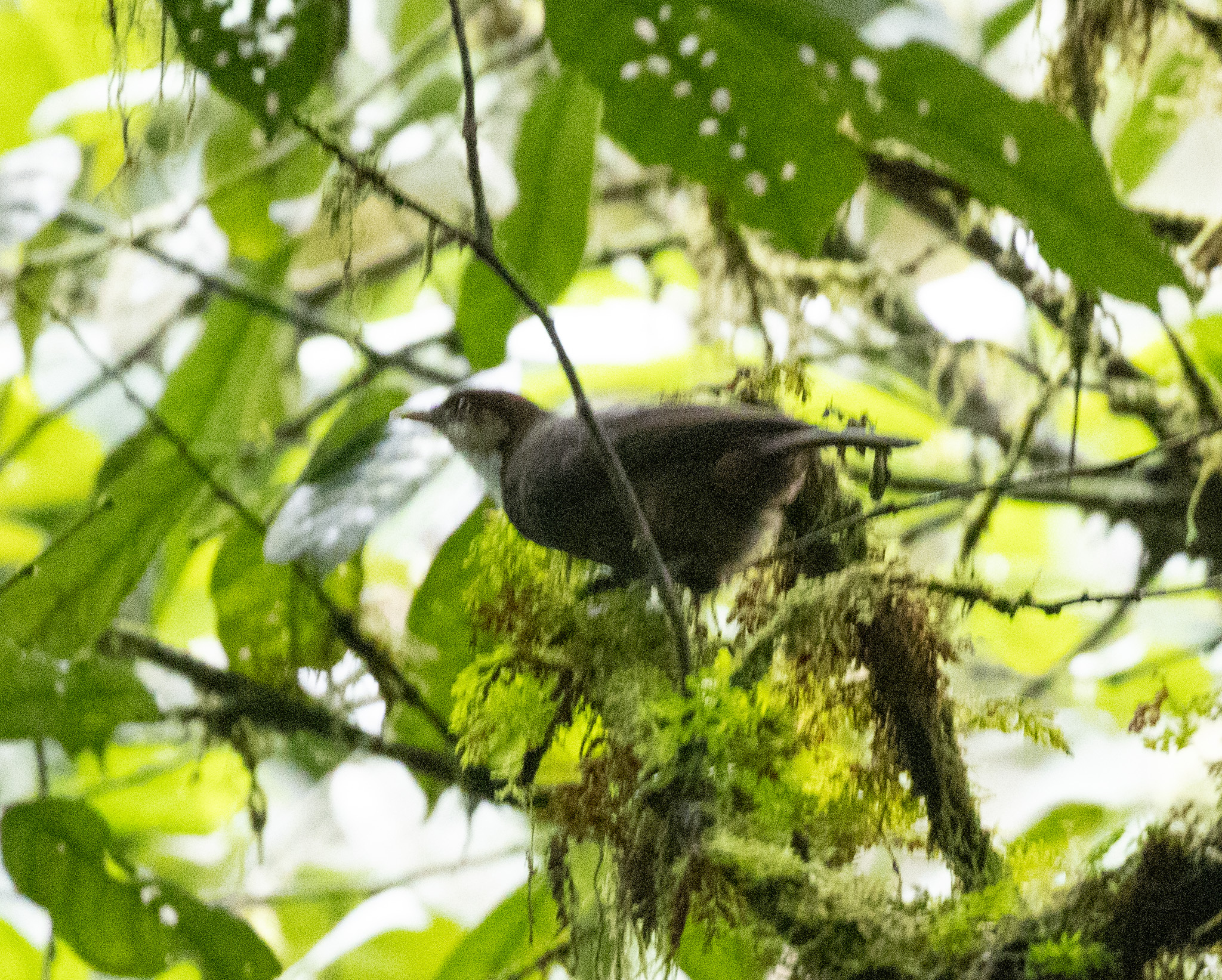

Conservation status
- Vulnerable (IUCN 3.1)

Scientific classification
- Kingdom: Animalia
- Phylum: Chordata
- Class: Aves
- Order: Passeriformes
- Family: Leiothrichidae
- Genus: Turdoides
- Species: T. gilberti

Binomial name
- Turdoides gilberti (Serle, 1949)

= White-throated mountain babbler =

Species of bird

The white-throated mountain babbler (Turdoides gilberti) is a passerine bird in the family Leiothrichidae. It is native to the Cameroonian Highlands forests.

It is threatened by habitat loss.

The white-throated mountain babbler was moved from the genus Kupeornis to Turdoides based on the results of a molecular phylogenetic study published in 2018.
