= Tombel =

- Commune and town
- Location in Cameroon
- Coordinates: 4°44′47″N 9°40′13″E
- Country: Cameroon
- Region: Southwest
- Department: Koupé-Manengouba
- Time zone: UTC+1 (WAT)

Tombel is a town and commune in the Southwest Region of Cameroon, in the north of the Mungo Valley. The town is traditionally part of the Bakossi people's country, but now has a significant population of other tribes from other regions of Cameroon.

In late 1966, tension between some Bakossi indigenes and some Bamilekes resulted in an outbreak of violence. This outbreak was the remnants of the Union of the Peoples of Cameroon's political movement. Losses were counted on both sides, mostly from the Bamilekes with 236 settlers dead. The Bakossi indigenes argued that some Bamilekes were forcing a political course that threatened the integrity of the Bakossi land and people. In response, the army moved in, rounded up all able-bodied Bakossi men in the Tombel area, and placed them in detention camps, where many were severely tortured to obtain confessions. Eventually, 143 Bakossi men were put on trial and 17 were sentenced to death, while 75 received sentences of life imprisonment.

Lying immediately to the south of Mount Kupe, Tombel receives little direct sunshine, particularly in the rainy season, due to constant cloud cover. The town has suffered from persistent shortage of water supply, despite attempts by the women of the town to improve the situation.

Politician Mary Muyali Meboka was born in Tombel.
