= Bakossi people =

Bakossi
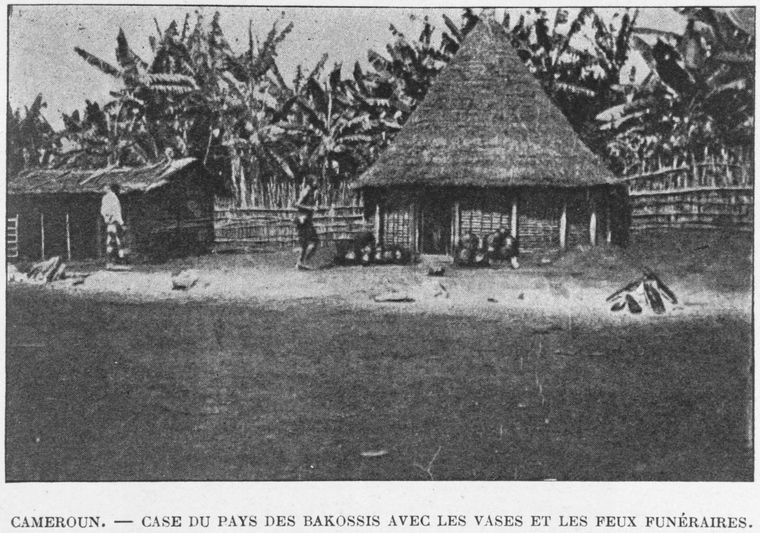
- Bakossi house in 1920

Total population
- 200,000

Regions with significant populations
- Bakossi Mountains (Cameroon)

Languages
- Akoose

Religion
- Christianity

Related ethnic groups
- Mbo and other Bantu peoples

The Bakossi people are a Bantu ethnic group that live on the western and eastern slopes of Mount Mwanenguba and Mount Kupe in the Bakossi Mountains of Cameroon. They number about 200,000, mostly engaged in subsistence farming but also producing some coffee and cocoa.

== Origins ==
According to their tradition, the Bakossi are descended from the great hunter Ngoe (or Ngweh) and his beautiful wife Sumediang. They had twelve children. At one time, a supernatural being warned the couple that a flood was coming and told them to make a box in which to escape. They built an ark, taking in their family and all kinds of animals, and survived the flood. The ark came to rest between the twin lakes of Mwanenguba, one of which is said to have a female character and the other male. The different clans claim descent from different children and grandchildren of this couple.

The Bakossi are related to other people of the region including the Bafaw, Bakundu, Balong, Bassossi, Mbo, Abo, Miamilo, Baneka, Muaneman, Muange, Bareko, Bakaka, Babong, Balondo, Manehas, Bongkeng, and Bakem. The Bakossi people speak a Bantu language called Akose. Today, this language includes many loan words from English, French and word that are also found or related to words in Douala. Ethnologue classifies the language in the Ngoe group of the Lundu-Balong family.

== Environment ==
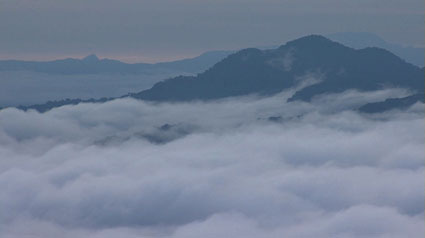
Photograph taken while shooting the 2007 documentary "Les Brumes du Manengouba" in the Bakossi Forests

The land occupied by the Bakossi people includes both highlands and lowlands. It has fertile soils, watered by streams that rise in the mountains, and is covered by dense forest which contain a wide variety of trees, birds and animals. Many of the Bakossi grow coco yam, cassava and some corn for food. For cash they cultivate coffee in the higher parts and cocoa lower down. More exotic foods include tadpoles and males of the Hairy Frog, which are thought to fall from the sky and, when eaten, to help childless human couples become fertile. Among the Bakossi, a hunter is respected for his skills and achievements as much as for the economic value of the animals he has managed to kill.

The Bakossi Forest Reserve of 5,517 square kilometres (2,130 sq mi) was created in 1956. In 2000, the main section of Bakossi was designated a protected forest. All logging was banned and Kupe became a "strict nature reserve". The local Bakossi people participated in delineating the boundaries. There were large gains in management effectiveness of the forest between 2003 and 2007 although the local people are still not well integrated into management of the area and there are weaknesses in education on environmental subjects.

== Traditional beliefs ==
The Bakossi beliefs and customs included belief and participation in jujus, a rather vague concept where the name of a juju might apply to a secret society, objects such as masks associated with the society, and certain magical powers. Mwakum was the most powerful of all the jujus, invisible, mysterious and full of magic. Some jujus were restricted to men of a certain age and demanded an initiation fee. Jujus and their ceremonies kept peace in the villages, warded off evils and detected the presence of witches.

The Bakossi people attached sinister magical properties to Mount Kupe. They believed that Nyongo, or members of the ekom association of witches, could put people to work on invisible plantations on the mountain. While still living, the future slaves would be given to a witch by a greedy relative in return for joining the association and gaining a plantation. After they appeared to die, but in fact became ekongi, the relatives were stolen from their graves by the witches and sold to a plantation owner. The practice of visiting a trader in ekongi is reported from 1962 in Douala, the commercial capital of Cameroon. The "ekongeur" would throw his visitor into a deep sleep through hypnosis. He would see the plantations with the ekongi working, and would be offered a plantation in return for someone such as his mother. On waking up, the ekongeur would explain that he now should take his time to decide what he would do... There may be an echo in this belief of early experiences with the slave trade.

The Nyongo could also find closed bundles on the mountain which might contain either riches or misfortunes, including illness and death. The bundle had to be brought back unopened and immediately thrown in the river if it was found to contain bad luck. By the 1950s a belief had risen that anyone who could afford a modern house with a tin roof must be a Nyongo, earning his wealth from the labors of his dead relatives. There was a reluctance to build such a house, even if the owner visibly did the work with his own hands and none of his relatives died. When a witch died, he could also become an ekongi. To prevent this, he might be buried face down so he could not rise, perhaps with his head severed from his body. These beliefs are now discredited. Heinrich Balz, in his 1984 study of the Bakossi, Where the Faith Has to Live, reported that before dying the last Ekom men left a message that there was no longer anything good to be found on Koupe. To get wealthy the people should take their cutlasses and open farms in the bush.

The Bakossi observed a ten-day cycle rather than the seven-day week common elsewhere. As elsewhere, they did not align their weeks with months.

== Pre-independence history ==
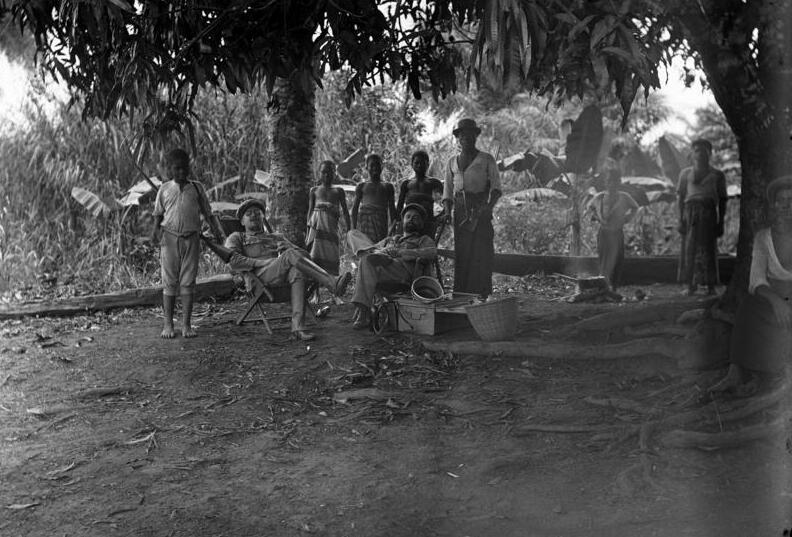
Two white settlers and local children and men on the Mungo River, Christmas 1901

The different Bakossi tribes originally each occupied independent territories, living as hunter-gatherers. As the Atlantic slave trade developed, the coastal town of Douala became an important trading center, reaching into the interior Bakossi Mountains along the Mungo valley. However, by the 1840s the slave trade had been replaced by the palm oil trade. Little is known about the effect on the Bakossi of either trade, but they were certainly involved in both. In nearby regions, slaves were still used domestically on palm oil plantations as gatherers, processors and carriers long after the export of slaves to the USA, Caribbean and Brazil had ceased.

During the European colonial era, the Bakossi came under German rule in the 1880s, and then, after World War I, their land was split between British and French colonies. The Mungo River, which flows through Bakossi territory, was taken as the southern boundary between the two colonies. Starting in the first half of the 20th century, Bamileke people began to migrate into Bakossi territory, particularly to the Tombel area, where they found work on the plantations and escaped the harsh forced-labor conditions on the French side of the border. They were welcomed by the Bakossi, who gave them land in return for free labor. The use of laborers in this way was consistent with the Bakossi's memories of employing slave labor and their belief in the invisible slave plantations on Mount Kupe.

In 1953, the Kumba Eastern Area Federation was established as an indigenous authority covering all the Bakossi. In the period immediately following World War II, the Bakossi people enjoyed a period of prosperity. Cocoa prices were high, and the farmers did not have to work since they could employ a sharecropper to tend the crop in return for one-third of the earnings. With nothing else to spend their money on, the men would buy cases of Spanish gin and brandy, consuming the booze in long drinking bouts that lasted all night. By the 1960s, the hangover set in as the people started to realize the need to invest in more important things, particularly education and became aware that they may have lost control of their land.

== Post-independence troubles ==
Mungo River valley. The river and then the mountain line formed the boundary between the former British and French colonies.

The modern independent state of Cameroon was formed in 1961 when the southern part of the British Cameroons united with the Republic of Cameroon, which had succeeded the French colony of Cameroun in 1960. The Bakossi were opposed to the union, and the Mwane-Ngoe Union of the Bakossi asked the United Nations to respect their wish to avoid the conflict in Cameroun and instead let them join Nigeria. At first the Southern Cameroons retained a degree of independence in a federation between two states. Full unification was resisted by the people of Southern Cameroons since they had a more democratic society than prevailed in the rest of the country under the oppressive regime of Ahmadou Ahidjo. In 1963, the Bangem District was created covering the land occupied by the Bakossi.

In the late 1950s and early 1960s, tensions began to rise between the Bakossi and the Bamileke people, who were becoming increasingly successful as farmers. The UPC rebellion broke out in the French territory in 1955, with Bamilekes prominent among the rebels. A growing number of Bamileke fled from persecution in the east and settled with their kin in Bakossi country. After unification in 1961 the UPC rebels came under increasing pressure and their numbers shrank. The remainder turned to living off the land, demanding supplies from the villages and capturing youths whom they inducted into their forces. This, along with pre-existing tensions between the Bakossi elite and the Kamerun National Democratic Party (KNDP) —which had its main base in the Anglophone part of the Grassfields— set the stage for the violence.

After three Bakossi were killed by unknown assailants on 31 December 1966, the Bakossi went on a rampage, killing 236 Bamileke settlers, looting and burning their houses. Substantial evidence suggest that this was the result of careful planning as evidenced by the fact that by late 1966, medicine men were active in distributing secret medicines which would give the Bakossi men courage and make them immune to bullets or machete strokes. In response the army moved in, rounded up all able-bodied Bakossi men in the Tombel area, and placed them in detention camps. Many were severely tortured to obtain confessions. Eventually 143 Bakossi men were put on trial and 17 sentenced to death. 75 received life sentences of life imprisonment. Bangem District was split into Northern and Southern districts in 1968, and, in 1977, the Bakossi Council was also split into Northern and Southern councils.

== Economic difficulties ==
Cameroon is a poor country, with a 2010 GPD per capita of US$2,300, placing it 183 among countries by wealth. Most of the people are engaged in agriculture. After independence the government faced growing demand for rural water supply. The government required that local communities provide labor to build the water facilities between 1964 and 1988, providing water through public taps. However, local councils found that the cost of supplying water to these taps was eating up a large part of their budget. When they failed to pay their bills the National Water Supply Company of Cameroun (SNEC) simply disconnected the supply. Starting in 1993 the SNEC tried privatizing the taps to reduce waste and recover costs, with an individual running the tap and selling the water. The Bakossi women of Tombel made a dramatic protest against these changes. In April 1994, 4,000 women marched on the SNEC offices, led by some old women who marched naked - their final weapon before death - and urinated on the steps. Herbs were thrown on the steps, which were said to be able to turn into poisonous snakes if anyone crossed the threshold. The SNEC employees had fled and refused to return from fear of the people and of the juju the women had placed. The outcome was partial success. Control of the water supply was given to a committee headed by the woman who had organized the protest. But the supply remained uncertain.

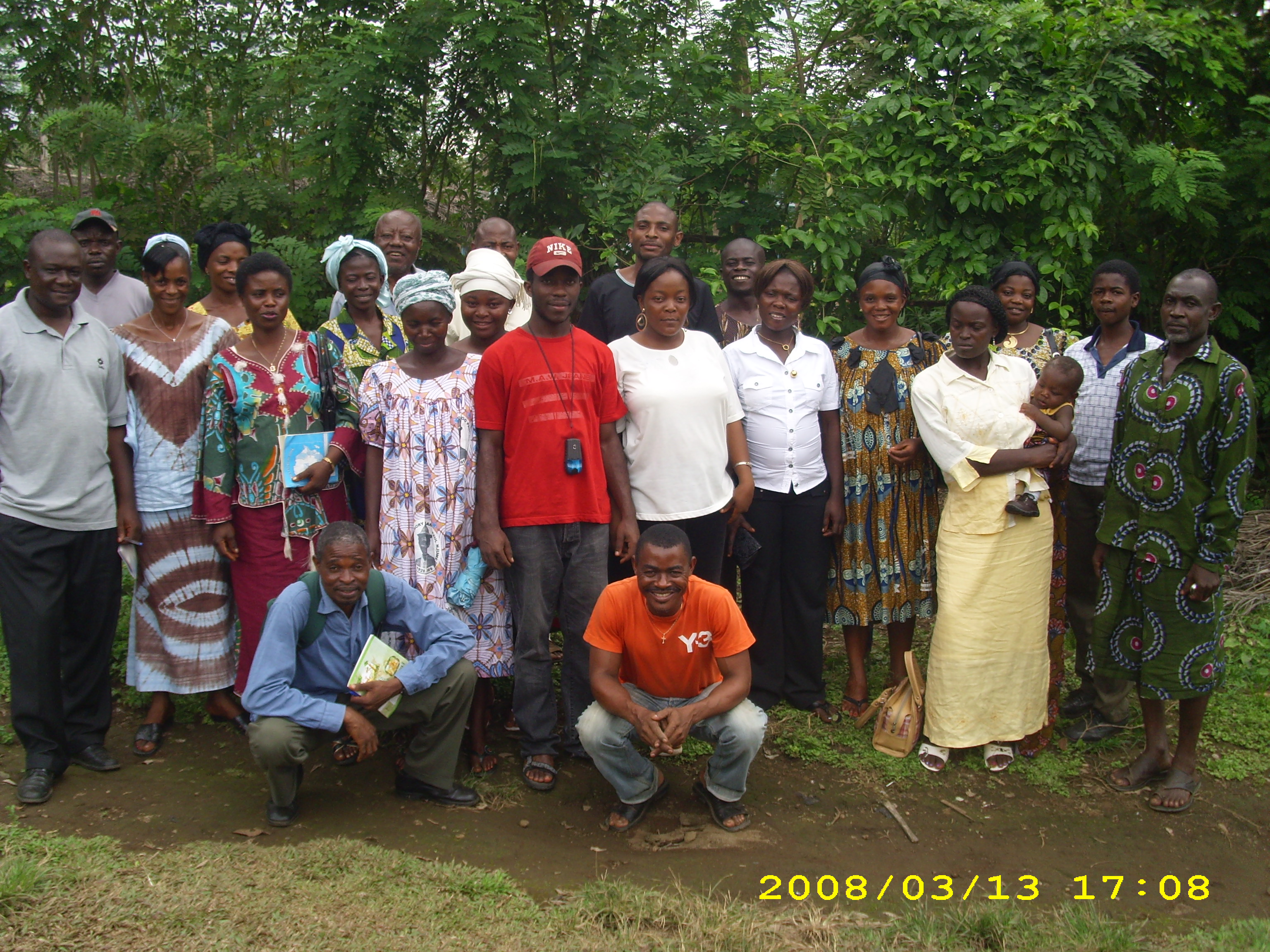
Farming trainees at Ngab in 2008

As of 2008, young Bakossi farmers faced the difficult choice of trying to make their way in the city or taking their chances in rural development. Some had started growing oil palms in Mbulle but lacked a processing machine, fertilizers and chemicals. Most important they lacked roads and transport to get their crops to market. Earlier cooperatives that gave some collective bargaining power had been disbanded leaving cash crop farmers at the mercy of private buyers.

== Prominent people ==
Albert Ngome Kome was a leading political figure of the Bakossi people. He was Minister of Transport from 8 November 1979 to 17 July 1984 under the governments of Ahmadou Ahidjo and his successor Paul Biya. A 2006 article described Kome as a member of the Kupe Muanenguba elite, which also included Mr Ekinde Sone Bernard Ivo, an educationist and politician; Professor Elvis Ngolle Ngolle, appointed Minister of Forests and Wildlife on 22 September 2006; Chief Justice Epuli Aloh Mathias; Professor Charles Epie Alobwede; Thomas Kolle Ekaney; Late Hon Nhon Nzuobontane Andrew Ngabe, Late Chief Lucas Nzuonkwelle; Ambassador Nkwelle Ekaney; Mr. Ngole Philip Ngwese; Nhon Mesue Stephen Nzuonkwelle; Makoge Ivo Charles; Nhon Nzuonkwelle Emmanuel Nkwelle; Nicolas Nkwelle Metuge; Dr. Nhon Nkwelle Jude Nzuonkwelle; General Ekongwese Divine Nnoko, appointed Military General on a presidential decree of 29 June 2017; Paul Elung; Hon. John Ebong Ngole; Dr. Nkwelle Akede Aaron, a pediatrician;late Ebong Ngalame and Late Justice Ngalame Kome, Mr Ekane Ivo Ekoti Supreme Court Justice and former Secretary of State; actress Syndy Emade and vocal Junior parliamentarian, Ekane Loïc Evrade.
