= Kékem =

Village in West Region, Cameroon

- Commune and town
- Location in Cameroon
- Coordinates: 5°10′N 10°02′E
- Country: Cameroon
- Region: West
- Department: Haut-Nkam
- Elevation: 877 m (2,877 ft)

Population (2012)
  - Total: 20,579
- Time zone: UTC+1 (WAT)

Kékem is a town and commune in Cameroon.

== See also ==
- Communes of Cameroon
