= Mount Kupe =

Mountain in Cameroun

- Mont Koupé
- Location within Cameroon

Highest point
- Elevation: 2,064 m (6,772 ft)
- Prominence: 1,044 m (3,425 ft)
- Listing: Ribu
- Coordinates: 4°48′05″N 9°42′29″E

Geography
- Location: Cameroon
- Parent range: Cameroon line

Mount Kupe or Mont Koupé is a plutonic mountain in the Western High Plateau of Cameroon, part of the Cameroon line of volcanoes. It is the highest of the Bakossi Mountains, rising to 2,064 metres (6,772 ft).

The mountain is revered by the local Bakossi people as the home of their ancestral and forest spirits. Missionaries in the 1890s observed that the mountain had a strong magical reputation, and it still has an important role in beliefs related to ekong, a form of witchcraft. The mountain used to be forest-covered apart from a few small grassy areas near the summit. Shifting cultivation, logging for timber, felling for fuelwood, growth and expansion of human settlements and establishment of pasture lands have deforested the Bakossi landscape. All sides of the mountain have been steadily converted to agricultural use. Forest has been cleared up to 1,500m on the eastern slopes and up to between 750m and 1,100m on the western and northern sides, above the villages of Mbule and Nyasoso.

As of 2010, there was still primary mid-elevation and montane rainforest on the northern side. The cloud forest supports rich biodiversity, and is home to chimpanzees and several species of threatened primates. The Mount Kupe bushshrike (Telophorus kupeensis) is known to be endangered due to its small range and declining quality of its habitat. The Mount Kupe Forest Project was first managed by BirdLife International, then by WWF-UK and most recently by WWF-Cameroon. As of 2010 the project was dormant.
