= Timeline of the Anglophone Crisis (2019) =

Conflict, started 2017, in Cameroon

This is a timeline of the Anglophone Crisis in Cameroon during 2019.

The Anglophone Crisis is an ongoing armed conflict in the Republic of Cameroon in Central Africa, where historically English-speaking Ambazonian separatists are seeking the independence of the former British trust territory of Southern Cameroons, which was unified with Cameroon since 1961.

== January ==
- On 2 January, armed men chopped the hands or fingers off at least half a dozen workers at Cameroon Development Corporation. No one claimed responsibility for the attack.
- On 3 January, armed men burned down the residence of Prime Minister Joseph Ngute in Bobongo, Ekondo-Titi, Southwest Region. In Mbelenka, Lebialem, three gendarmes were wounded in a separatist attack. In Widikum, Momo Division, an Ambazonian general was killed when security forces raided a separatist camp. Government forces claimed that 17 separatists were killed during the raid, while the separatists claimed that the general was the sole loss. In Fundong, a police officer was killed.
- On 4 January, separatists killed two soldiers and wounded two more in Fundong, seizing their weapons.
- Between 4–27 January, the Cameroonian Army claimed to have killed 68 separatist fighters. The separatists claimed that 14 or more were civilians.
- On 6 January, Anglophone Cameroonians in the diaspora organized protests to mark the first anniversary of the arrest of the Ambazonian leadership. Throughout the day, armed clashes took place in Muyuka, Bafut, Mundum and Mamfe. In Mamfe, two Ambazonian generals were killed when their camps were raided by the Rapid Intervention Battalion.
- On 10 January, Ambazonia's first president Sisiku Julius Ayuk Tabe, as well as other Ambazonian leaders who had been extradited from Nigeria to Cameroon a year before, appeared before the Military Tribunal in Yaoundé. This was followed by ghost towns all over the Anglophone regions. In Muyuka, heavy clashes led to a large military deployment.
- On 11 January, government soldiers ambushed and killed at least 21 separatist fighters in Mbot, Nkambé, Northwest Region. According to villagers, the soldiers burned down several houses during the attack.
- On 12 January, at least seven suspected separatists were killed in Alabukam, Northwest Region, bringing the total number of separatists killed over the weekend to at least 28.
- On 15 January, unidentified gunmen illegally detained at least 36 people at the Buea-Kumba Highway. They were released the next day, while the gunmen held on to phones and money.
- On 16 January, separatist fighters killed a soldier in Ngoh. In Ediki, 36 civilians were briefly abducted.
- On 17 January, two soldiers were beheaded.
- On 18 January, a well-known investor and cattle owner from Wum was assassinated by suspected separatists. As a response, government forces raided a separatist camp in Wum two days later, killing at least six separatists. Two soldiers were beheaded somewhere in Northwest Region.
- Between 18–27 January, separatists killed six soldiers.
- On 19 January, unidentified gunmen set a truck on fire in Nkwen, Bamenda. Gunshots in front of public buildings forced civilians to flee.
- On 22 January, the head of a decapitated security guard was displayed on a stick in the Kosala neighborhood of Kumba.
- On 23 January, three people were arrested in Mamfe for smuggling ammunition from Nigeria.
- On 24 January, the leader of Southern Cameroons Defence Forces (SOCADEF), General Andrew Ngoe, was killed in Matoh, Mbonge, alongside several other SOCADEF fighters. SOCADEF confirmed the loss.
- On 25 January, two lawyers were abducted in Buea.
- On 28 January, two separatists were killed during a clash in Bambili, and another three near Bamenda, where a policeman was also killed. Clashes also took place in Bafut, where Cameroonian forces launched a two-day offensive in which they captured a separatist camp. 14 separatists were killed in Bafut, while government casualties remained unclear.

== February ==
- On 4 February, separatists declared a 10-day lockdown, telling people all across the Anglophone regions to stay at home from 5–14 February. The lockdown was a matter of controversy among the separatists, with a spokesperson of the Ambazonia Defence Forces arguing that it would be counterproductive. In Mamfe, the corpses of nine young men were discovered. In Ndu, at least three separatist fighters were killed in clashes with the army, before heavy rains forced the army to abort its operation and retreat. In Buea, one person was killed and another was wounded by armed men.
- On 5 February, separatists initiated the planned ten-day lockdown. Large parts of Buea were closed down, while armed clashes took place in Muea and Muyuka. Most of Bamenda was closed down, with smaller clashes taking place. In Muyuka, an Ambazonian Colonel was killed alongside two other separatist fighters. In Mbengwi, two separatists died while attacking the Divisional Office there.
- On 6 February, gunmen clashed with the security forces and burned three vehicles in Buea. A civilian was killed after being caught in the crossfire, and at least two civilians were abducted by the gunmen. A headless body was also discovered, possibly a security officer. In Bole-Bakundu, Mbonge, at least 15 civilians were killed when the army moved against separatists, most of whom managed to escape. In Widikum, separatists attacked a military brigade, wounding five soldiers. The United States announced it would be withholding military support to Cameroon over the government's handling of the crisis.
- On 7 February, separatists ambushed a military truck in Ndawara, Northwest Region, injuring six Cameroonian soldiers, three seriously. The security forces claimed to have killed 10 separatists. 15 human rights organizations, including Civicus and the Centre for Human Rights and Democracy in Africa, called on the UN to investigate "serious" human rights violations committed by Cameroonian troops.
- By 8 February, according to Cameroon, 69 people had been killed in fighting since Tuesday ahead of Cameroon's Youth Day on the 11th, including 47 separatists, 16 civilians and six government soldiers. The separatists claimed to have killed more soldiers.
- On 11 February, Youth Day celebrations had negligible turnout in the Anglophone regions, the Interim Government of Ambazonia having declared a lockdown in advance. In Bamenda, the Governor of Northwest Region, Adolph Lele l’Afrique, was escorted by soldiers to attend a small celebration. The military escort came under fire while driving to the ceremony, possibly resulting in casualties. The celebrations were boycotted in most major cities in the Anglophone regions, including Buea, Kumbo, Belo, Ndop, Ndu, Wum, Muyuka, Mamfe, Tombem, Mundemba and Lebialem, while there was a comparatively significant turnout in Nkambe. In Kumba, unidentified arsonists put a hospital on fire, leading to the death of at least four people. The Cameroonian Army blamed separatists, while separatists and some eyewitnesses claimed the army burned down the hospital after learning that separatist fighters were being treated there. The Cameroonian Army also announced it had captured around 200 mercenaries who were about to disembark near Idenau.
- On 12 February, the Governor of the South West Region travelled to Kumba to visit the hospital that was burned the day before. His convoy was attacked multiple times, leaving four soldiers injured.
- On 14 February, the separatist-imposed ten-day lockdown came to an end. Between 5–14 February, at least 100 people had died.
- On 16 February, unidentified gunmen abducted 176 people from Saint Augustine's College in Kumba, and released them the next day. The school subsequently announced it would shut down.
- On 17 February, the Cameroonian military burned down at least 30 houses in Kumbo.
- On 18 February, gunmen attacked the Assistant Secretary General of President Paul Biya, Paul Elung Che, in Bangem, before making an unsuccessful attempt to burn down his residency.
- On 19 February, at least six plantation workers had their fingers chopped up by unidentified gunmen in Tiko.
- On 21 February, separatists blocked a road in the Mile 14 Dibanda neighborhood of Buea, burning at least two vehicles. In Bamenda, a journalist was abducted by gunmen and held captive for hours.
- On 28 February, separatist attack army camps in Bafut and Mbiame, leaving one soldier and one separatist dead.
- At some point in February, a Rapid Intervention Battalion general was killed in an ambush in Lebialem.

== March ==
- On 1 March, around 10 people were killed in three localities in Northwest Region by government soldiers. In Nigeria, a Federal High Court Judge ordered the return of 69 Ambazonian leaders and activists, including President Sisiku Julius Ayuk Tabe, to Nigeria, as their deportation to Cameroon in January 2018 violated the Nigerian constitution. The court also ruled that they should all receive financial compensation for their wrongful deportation.
- On 10 March, gunmen beheaded a man they accused of being close to Cameroonian Army officers in Kumba. His body was left in the streets, together with a written warning to "black legs".
- Between 11–17 March, a dozen civilians were killed in Bui and Donga-Mantung.
- Between 11–20 March, at least 26 civilians and seven soldiers were killed in 30 separate incidents.
- On 14 March, Cameroonian soldiers killed at least 12 people (several of whom were burned alive), injured more and burned down several houses in Dunga Mantung and Menchum.
- On 16 March, a police officer was burned alive by suspected separatists in Bamenda. The incident was followed by armed clashes, as security forces chased the suspected separatists.
- On 19 March, around 80 people were illegally detained by gunmen along the Kumba-Buea Highway. The Rapid Intervention Battalion intervened, and managed to rescue all those abducted.
- On 20 March, former minister Emmanuel Ngafeson Banta was abducted by suspected separatists in Bamenda, and spent ten days in captivity before being released by his captors. In Buea, more than 15 students at the University of Buea were abducted by separatist fighters.
- On 21 March, Cameroonian soldiers ambushed and killed General Ayekeah of the Red Dragon militia, as well as two of his fighters.
- On 22 March, the Seven Karta militia set up concrete walls on the Bafut-Bamenda Highway in the villages of Agyati and Chum.
- On 25 March, clashes in Limbe left one civilian dead.
- On 26 March, security forces stopped an attempt by gunmen to abduct a teacher in Buea.
- On 27 March, separatist fighters ambushed and killed two Cameroonian soldiers and two aides of a businessman in Donga-Mantung. In Widikum, soldiers killed three civilians.
- On 31 March, various Ambazonian movements (including the Interim Government, the Southern Cameroons National Council, Southern Cameroons Civil Society Consortium, Republic of Ambazonia and the African People's Liberation Movement) agreed to form the Southern Cameroons Liberation Council, a united front consisting of both separatists and federalists.

== April ==
- On 1 April, separatist fighters raided Penda Mboko, Littoral Region, where they attacked a security checkpoint and wounded three gendarmes. A 30-minute gunfight ensued, before reinforcements pushed the separatists back. In Mutengene, Fako Division, mass arrests were carried out by security forces.
- On 4 April, rumors of a separatist-imposed lockdown triggered an exodus of people from Buea. The Interim Government denied having ordered a lockdown. In Meluf, Northwest Region, Cameroonian soldiers killed five civilians, including a disabled man, and wounded one more. Some of the corpses were mutilated.
- On 5 April, the head coach of PWD Bamenda was kidnapped, held for a few hours and then released unharmed.
- On 7 April, six children were kidnapped by unidentified gunmen in Fongo-Tongo, Menoua, West Region. In Bamenda, a teacher was abducted and held for a week.
- On 8 April, at least four people were killed by Cameroonian soldiers in Fuh, Ndu, including the sub chief of the village.
- On 9 April, the newly established Southern Cameroons Liberation Council (SCLC) declared an early end to the 10-day lockdown that had started on 4 April, citing how it mainly affected civilians. However, the Ambazonia Self-Defence Council, the armed wing of the Interim Government, declared that the SCLC had no authority to call off the lockdown. The same day, the President of the Bangem High Court was abducted by gunmen in Buea. He was released two days later.
- On 11 April, three waste management workers were abducted in Bamenda.
- On 13 April, a corpse dressed in a military uniform was discovered in Bambui. There had been clashes between separatists and security forces the night before.
- On 14 April, four Cameroonian soldiers and three separatist fighters were killed in Bali. In Ekona, at least six people were killed in a government offensive.
- On 15 April, security forces carried out mass arrests as they searched for separatist bases in Buea. In Bali, clashes left three government soldiers and four separatist fighters dead.
- On 19 April, the brother of SDF leader John Fru Ndi was abducted along with two workers by unidentified gunmen.
- On 23 April, a gendarme was abducted in Muyuka. He was found dead the next day.
- On 24 April, gunmen burned down the house of the mayor of Fundong. In Bamenda, a school proprietor was abducted, tortured and released the same day after a ransom was paid. In Kumbo, the second-in-command to the Fon of Nso was abducted by suspected separatists.
- On 25 April, a human head, possibly that of a soldier beheaded by separatists, was discovered in Bamenda. In retaliation, security forces burned several vehicles.
- On 27 April, SDF leader John Fru Ndi was abducted in Kumbo by separatists. He was released shortly afterwards, and the SDF claimed that the whole affair owed to a "misunderstanding" that was quickly solved. The next day, a video of John Fru Ndi conversing with his captors surfaced online, shedding light upon the purpose of the abduction. In the video, the gunmen asked the SDF leader to withdraw all SDF legislators from the National Assembly and the senate. Fru Ndi replied that he would not, stating that it would be counterproductive to boycott the only forum where they could talk to President Biya. Fru Ndi had travelled to Kumbo to attend the funeral of Joseph Banadzem, the Parliamentary group leader of the SDF. Local separatist fighters had consented to the funeral taking place, provided that no Francophone Cameroonians attended it. In Yaoundé, the ten detained members of the Interim Government of Ambazonia announced that they would start boycotting court sessions.
- On 30 April, the Divisional Officer of Ndu threatened to dismiss civil servants who had fled from the town. He claimed that "99 percent" of Ndu under was now under government control after security forces had pushed out the separatists, and that it was safe to return. In Kikaikelaiki, Bui, government soldiers killed one person and burned at least 10 houses.

== May ==
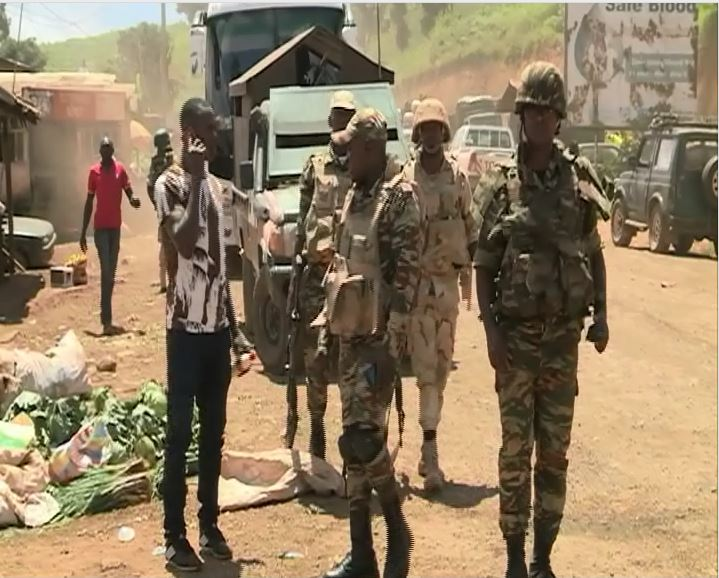
Cameroonian soldiers in Bamenda, 24 May.

- On 2 May, a document signed by Ayuk Tabe declared that the Sako-led interim cabinet had been dissolved, and that his own pre-arrest cabinet had been restored. The document expressed appreciation of the job the Sako-led cabinet had done since February 2018, but stressed that infighting had rendered it unfit to continue; the caretaker cabinet has lost the ability to reconcile our people and, in doing so, has imperiled the identity and mission of the interim government to complete the decolonization of Southern Cameroons through advancing our collective national interests. The Sako-led cabinet refused to step down, triggering the Ambazonian leadership crisis.
- On 4 May, Cameroonian soldiers killed two civilians in Wowo village, Ndu. The army later claimed they had been mistaken for separatist fighters.
- On 5 May, following appeals by the European Union Parliament, it was announced that the Anglophone Crisis would be debated at the United Nations Security Council. The original proposal was for a formal debate to be held; however, due to objections from non-permanent member South Africa, there would only be informal talks. South Africa and other African countries opposed in principle the involvement of the UN in the Anglophone Crisis, preferring that the African Union should handle it instead. In Bakassi, it was reported that Cameroonian gendarmes had destroyed the fishing community of Abana. According to locals who escaped, at least 40 people had been killed. The authorities denied that gendarmes had been involved, and blamed a local militia. According to the state government, Cameroonian soldiers subsequently moved into Abana and arrested 15 people suspected of having participated in the killings. In Ndu, Cameroonian soldiers invaded separatist bases in the villages of Ntamruh and Ntayi, but the separatists had already withdrawn. The soldiers subsequently burned down 42 houses and killed at least seven people. 400 cows were also missing after the attack.
- On 6 May, a video emerged online where three women had been tortured by separatist fighters in Bamenda, apparently for taking part in Labour Day celebrations on 1 May. The separatists had announced a lockdown that day, and the three women were made to swear to observe future lockdowns. In Bambui, a breastfeeding woman and her baby were killed by stray bullets.
- On 7 May, the Disarmament, Demobilisation and Reintegration Committee announced that a total of 56 separatist fighters had surrendered since its creation. This claim was questioned by the human rights group Cameroon Watch, which claimed that many of those who had surrendered were common criminals who had posed as separatist fighters.
- On 8 May, the Social Democratic Front announced that it would boycott National Day celebrations out of sympathy with people suffering from the Anglophone Crisis. The separatists had previously announced that there would be a lockdown on National Day on 20 May.
- On 9 May, Cameroonian Prime Minister Joseph Ngute embarked on a trip to the Anglophone regions. From Bamenda, he stated that President Paul Biya was ready for an inclusive dialogue to end the war, although there would be no dialogue on the question of Ambazonian independence.
- On 13 May, a military helicopter carrying security officials and local administrators crashed in Elak-Oku, leaving one dead and six wounded. While separatists claimed responsibility, reports indicated a technical fault.
- On 14 May, an informal discussion was held at the UN Security Council. While France, Belgium, Equatorial Guinea and the Ivory Coast expressed support for the peace efforts of the Cameroonian government, the United States, Germany, the United Kingdom, South Africa, India, Russia, Poland, Kuwait, Peru and the Dominican Republic criticized it for not doing enough and for violating human rights. China took a position of neutrality.
- On 15 May, separatist fighters killed at least two government soldiers in Bamenda. Cameroonian soldiers responded with a crackdown, burning several houses, a church and health centre in the process. The owners of those houses were offered compensation by the Cameroonian government. The same day, Prime Minister Joseph Ngute turned down a proposal by lawyers and students in Buea to demilitarize the region.
- Between 15–27 May, two soldiers, 17 separatist fighters and three civilians were killed throughout Northwest Region.
- On 16 May, there were clashes in Buea. Prime Minister Joseph Ngute, who was supposed to visit Kumba, was forced to stay in his hotel room in Buea as government soldiers battled the separatists. After the separatists had been repelled, the visit commenced as planned.
- On 17 and 18 May, a preparatory meeting was organized by the Centre for Humanitarian Dialogue (HD) with some leaders of the pro-independence groups of Southern Cameroons. The meeting aimed at preparing the participants ahead of potential negotiations with the Government of Cameroon as part of the Swiss-led mediation process.
- On 20 May, a four-month old baby was killed by Cameroonian soldiers inside a family home in Muyuka. Fearing for their safety, the family went into hiding.
- On 23 May, at least nine people were killed and several houses were burned in Esu, Menchum, in the aftermath of gun battles that had lasted for hours.
- On 25 May, clashes in Bali Nyonga, Mezam left at least seven people dead, five of whom belonged to a single family.
- On 26 May, at least two civilians were killed by Cameroonian soldiers in Buea.
- On 28 May 11 Ambazonian leaders declared that they were ready to negotiate with a third-party mediator.
- On 30 May, unidentified armed men attacked the Upkwa village in Wum, where they burned over 40 houses, abused civilians, killed their livestock and plundered their possessions.
- On 31 May, two human heads were discovered in Meluf, Bui Division. Locals claimed they were separatists who had been summarily executed by Cameroonian soldiers the day before. In Limbe, there was an explosion at the SONARA Oil Refinery; evidence pointed towards an accident. Near Lake Nyos, around a hundred separatist fighters invaded a Fulani resettlement camp, where they torched dozens of houses and killed livestock.

== June ==
- On 3 June, dozens of ethnic Fulani reportedly attacked residents of Wum town, Naikom, leaving at least one Wodaabe man dead. According to a report by the International Crisis Group, the attackers were encouraged by security forces. According to the Cameroon News Agency, local Wodaabe then called up the security forces, and together burned several buildings, including the Naikom Palace.
- On 5 June, fighting between separatists and government soldiers left three people dead in Ndekwai and another three in Babungo.
- On 7 June, heavy fighting broke out in Esu, Menchum. The clashes lasted for three days, and saw at least 12 civilians dead, as well as a Cameroonian soldier.
- On 8 June, eight people were summarily executed by Cameroonian soldiers in Ekona. While separatists claimed the victims were all civilians, the security forces claimed they were separatist fighters who had attacked soldiers shortly before their deaths.
- On 12 June, clashes in Santa left one separatist fighter and one civilian dead. In Jakiri, several houses and a market were set on fire during a confrontation.
- On 14 June, six corpses were discovered in Babanki.
- On 15 June, four policemen were killed and another six were wounded when a road bomb exploded in Eyumodjock, Manyu This was the first documented use of heavy weapons by the separatists, who had recently announced that they had started producing their own weapons within the Anglophone regions.
- On 17 June, a policeman was killed by separatist fighters in Mamfe.
- On 18 June, suspected separatists ambushed an army convoy killing one soldier near Bamenda. On the same day, separatists reportedly briefly illegally detained 40 people.
- On 21 June, soldiers from the Rapid Intervention Battalion killed an old man and raped a woman in Kumbo.
- On 22 June, the separatist Interim Government of Ambazonia said it was holding informal talks with the Cameroonian government.
- On 23 June, a video emerged online where armed men in Mezam were setting fire to a truck carrying humanitarian aid from the Cameroonian government.
- On 25 June, Archbishop Cornelius Fontem Esua of the Catholic Archdiocese of Bamenda was abducted by separatist fighters in Belo. The fighters told him that they had been ordered to arrest him because he had gone around a roadblock, compromising separatist operations in the area. He apologized to a Commandant, and was in turn informed that he would be allowed to go home as soon as possible. Due to concerns about the Archbishop's safety, he had to spend a night with his captors and was only able to return to Bamenda the following day. He had spent a total of 12 hours with the separatists. He later stated that he had not been harmed, and that the separatist fighters had been "very gentle" to him.
- On 27 June, the Swiss Federal Department of Foreign Affairs confirmed that it would act as a mediator in upcoming negotiations, following requests from both the Cameroonian government and the Ambazonian separatists. Eight separatist organizations issued a joint statement confirming their willingness to engage in the Swiss-led mediation process, while reaffirming that independence remained their goal. In Sabga, Cameroonian soldiers shot four people.
- On 28 June, the United Nations, the European Union and the United States issued statements of support to the Swiss-led mediation process. In Bamenda, SDF leader John Fru Ndi was abducted from his home, his second abduction in two months. His bodyguard was shot in the leg during the incident, and was rushed to a hospital. Unlike the first incident, this time Fru Ndi was subjected to beating, insults and rough treatment. The separatists demanded that he declare on video that he would recall all SDF senators and mayors within 24 hours. Fru Ndi refused to do so at gunpoint, and instead promised to discuss things with the politicians and get back to the separatists. The abductors complained that he had never visited them before, to which he replied that he had never been invited. In the end, he was forced to be photographed with the Ambazonian flag, before being driven back to his home at night. He had spent more than 24 hours in captivity.

== July ==
- On 2 July, the Vice President of the Interim Government of Ambazonia declared a 24-hour unilateral ceasefire, effective from midnight, to allow a United States Congressional delegation to safely visit the Anglophone regions. The declaration included a list of suggested places they might want to visit, as well as a request for the Cameroonian government to reciprocate and also declare a ceasefire. The declaration was ignored by the Congressional delegation and the Cameroonian government, as well as by separatist fighters.
- On 3 July, at least 30 separatist fighters ambushed a military boat carrying 13 Cameroonian soldiers on the Ekpambiri river, Manyu Division. According to the Cameroonian Army, the attackers used dane guns and automatic rifles. Three soldiers escaped, and two more were found in a rescue mission shortly after the attack. While the corpse of one of the soldiers was discovered after five days, the remaining seven remain unaccounted for. The Cameroonian Army declared that they knew which base the attackers had come from, and that an operation would be launched to destroy it.
- On 4 July, Cameroonian soldiers killed a nurse and wounded her 15-year-old sister inside their house in Bamenda.
- On 8 July, at least two gendarmes were killed and several more were wounded in an ambush in Ndop.
- On 10 July, soldiers from the Cameroon Air Force killed a construction worker and a mentally disabled man in Bamenda. An elderly man was also killed in the crossfire during clashes, which was followed by the searching of homes by government soldiers.
- On 11 July, at least seven separatist fighters were killed in Esu, according to the Cameroonian Army.
- On 12 July, armed men stopped a bus that was passing through Belo and kidnapped around 30 passengers. Locals claimed infighting between armed groups to be the cause of the incident, with the kidnappers conditioning the release of the passengers on the return of firearms previously confiscated by another armed group.
- On 14 July, one Cameroonian soldier and three separatist fighters were killed in Muea, Buea.
- On 15 July, Anglophone magistrate Justice Chi Valentine Bumah was abducted by unidentified, French-speaking gunmen. In a video that circulated online, one of the abductors questioned Bumah on criticizing the Cameroonian government. There were also clashes in Kumba. In Bali, four suspected separatist fighters were filmed while beating up breast-feeding mothers, accusing them of tipping off Cameroonian soldiers about their whereabouts.
- On 17 July, Barrister Sang George Nang, one of the lawyers to the ten detained members of the Interim Government of Ambazonia, was abducted in Bamenda, held for a day and then released. In Mbiame, at least one Cameroonian soldier and at least five separatist fighters were killed. The Cameroonian Army also suffered three wounded and lost a few military vehicles.
- On 18 July, armed men abducted a manager of the Cameroon Development Corporation from his home in Idenau. Two of his guards were also abducted. In Bamenda, two doctors were abducted; they spent 24 hours in captivity before being released.
- On 19 July, an army officer was abducted from his home in Bamenda by gunmen. Relatives of the officer offered the abductors 500,000 CFA franc in ransom. The abductors refused the offer, and demanded 10 million instead.
- On 21 July, a gendarme officer was killed in a separatist attack on a control post in Eyumodjock, Manyu. The same day, the Cameroonian Army claimed to have killed 20 or more separatist fighters within the last two days.
- On 22 July, Ambazonian detainees at Kondengui Central Prison staged a protest against the prison conditions and the war in the Anglophone regions. The protest soon escalated into a riot, with Ambazonian and Cameroon Renaissance Movement inmates taking over the prison yard, forcing the guards to pull out. Security forces moved in to regain control, firing shots in the air and using tear gas on the inmates. Several prisoners were injured in the quelling of the riot, which was also broadcast live on Facebook by participants. Following the incident, Amnesty International called on Cameroon to improve the prison conditions in Kondengui, and to allow an independent investigation of the crackdown on the riot. More than 100 inmates were moved to undisclosed locations for detention, and there were speculations that some had been killed during the riot. The Network for the Defence of Human Rights in Central Africa later claimed that at least some of the missing detainees had been subjected to "severe torture".
- On 24 July, around 100 inmates at Buea Central Prison, acting in solidarity with their fellow detainees at Kondengui, staged a protest of their own. Security forces fired shots in the air while quelling the demonstration.
- On 26 July, the two competing factions of the Interim Government of Ambazonia issued statements regarding the riot at Kondengui. The faction loyal to Samuel Ikome Sako gave Cameroon five days to account for the inmates who had been missing following the riot at Kondengui; if it failed to do so, the separatists would enforce a "total lockdown" where "nothing enters and nothing leaves" the Anglophone regions, starting on 30 July. The faction loyal to Sisiku Julius Ayuk Tabe, supported by the Ambazonia Governing Council, refrained from making any ultimatums, declaring instead that a lockdown would be imposed on 29 and 30 July regardless of Cameroon's actions.
- On 29 July, the lockdown announced on 26 July came into effect. There were reports of gunshots in Mbengwi. Governor of Northwest Region Adolphe Lele L’Afrique embarked on a peace tour across the region, starting in Nkambé. On the way there, his convoy came under attack twice by separatist fighters. In Donga-Mantung, four separatist fighters were killed.
- On 30 July, the ten detained members of the Interim Government of Ambazonia declared that they would go on a hunger strike over the disappearance of convicts at Kondenguin Central Prison and the Buea Central Prison, starting at midnight. Later on the same day, the Cameroonian government broke the silence and declared that rumors of the deaths of any detainees were false, and that all were doing fine while being held for investigation. At midnight, the hunger strike started as announced.

== August ==
- On 2 August, Pidgin news anchor Samuel Wazizi was arrested by the military. Days later, he was accused of having ties with separatist militias, an accusation he denied. On 2 June 2020, it was reported that he had died at a military hospital due to torture, after being held for more than 300 days.
- On 4 August, separatist fighters ambushed and killed a soldier and his civilian driver in Penda Mboko, Littoral Region. The Ambazonia Military Forces rejected calls from the Sako-led faction of the Interim Government for a 10-day lockdown. The detained Ayuk Tabe cabinet equally rejected the calls.
- On 6 August, two priests were abducted by suspected separatists in Kumbo, allegedly for encouraging parents to ignore the separatist school boycott. While one of the priests was released the same day, the other one was held until 10 August and allegedly subjected to torture.
- On 7 August, six people were killed in Njenefor, Nkwen, including a mother and her two children who were summarily executed outside their home by Cameroonian soldiers.
- On 9 August, the traditional ruler of Ntumbaw, Ndu was kidnapped by gunmen suspected to be separatists. The abductors later demanded seven million CFA franc for his release. Clashes in Southwest Region left a number of separatists dead.
- Between 11 and 15 August, government soldiers killed seven civilians in Banga Bakundu and Mautu.
- Between 12 and 18 August, at least 15 people were killed in Bamenda, including 10 civilians and five soldiers.
- On 13 August, civil servants who had escaped from Bui Division were given an ultimatum by the Senior Divisional Officers to get back to work or face punitive measures.
- On 14 August, separatist militias announced that region-wide lockdowns would be enforced on 2–6 September and 9–13, covering the first two weeks of the academic year. These lockdowns were endorsed by the Ayuk Tabe cabinet, while the Sako cabinet declared a three-week lockdown starting from 26 August. The amount of respect for these lockdowns was expected to reveal which government held the most influence on the ground.
- On 15 August, at least seven soldiers from the Rapid Intervention Battalion were injured when their vehicle skidded off the road in Kumba. The soldiers sustained anything from minor and life-threatening injuries, and were promptly transported to a hospital. Separatists claimed responsibility for the incident, claiming that the vehicle had hit an improvised explosive device; however, the Cameroonian Army claimed it was simply a road accident. Separatist fighters had attacked the vehicle when it passed through Muyuka earlier the same day. Outside Bali, a police officer was mortally wounded in a separatist ambush, and died later in a hospital. A soldier was also killed in Muyuka. The same day, six separatist fighters were killed in various locations.
- On 16 August, two Catholic priests were abducted in Kumbo while on their way to Oku. The government blamed armed separatists, while the separatists were quick to deny any involvement. The priests were released late on 18 August. In Ghana, SOCADEF leader Ebenezer Akwanga was questioned by the Ghanaian Bureau of National Investigations.
- On 20 August, the ten detained members of the Interim Government of Ambazonia, including President Ayuk Tabe, were sentenced to life imprisonment by the Yaoundé Military Tribunal. This was followed by military escalation across the Anglophone regions, and the Ambazonia Defence Forces announced that a half-year lockdown was being planned. In Bamenda, separatist forces responded to the sentencing by enforcing an unannounced ghost town.
- On 21 August, parts of Bamenda were shut down, and there were gunfights at a food market. According to the Cameroonian military, at least two people were killed and another six were wounded. In Momo Division, two football players were found dead in a river, having reportedly drowned while escaping from separatist fighters. In Eyumodjock, 16 people were illegally detained by armed men; they were released two days later with no ransom paid, and none were subjected to violence while in captivity.
- On 22 August, three teachers were kidnapped by separatist fighters in Buea. In Bamenda, a journalist was kidnapped by armed men, held overnight and released unharmed the next day.
- On 24 August, civilians invaded travel agencies in Bamenda, desperate to get out of the city as they were unprepared for the sudden lockdown declared four days prior. In Kumbo, separatist fighters abducted the bishop of the local Roman Catholic Diocese, apparently wanting him to pray for them. He was released the same day.
- On 25 August, the SDO of Lebialem banned iron rods in the division. Days before, soldiers had discovered that separatists were producing their own weapons in the division. In Ndop, unidentified gunmen killed three civilians. In Wum, suspected Fulani herdsmen, with alleged support from the Cameroonian government, killed seven people and mutilated at least one person.
- In total, between 24 and 25 August, a total of at least 40 people were killed in Bafut, Bamenda, Ndop, Kumbo, Mamfe and Kumba. In addition, eight people were kidnapped.
- On 26 August, a three-week lockdown announced by the Sako-led Interim Government came into force. Uncertainty regarding this lockdown, a particularly violent weekend and fear of the upcoming two lockdowns in early September triggered a mass exodus of Anglophones into other parts of the country, with tens of thousands of people fleeing.
- On 27 August, most of Bamenda was deserted due to the lockdown, while there were still vehicles moving around in Buea, Kumba and Tiko. In Limbe, the lockdown was completely ignored.
- On 28 August, suspected separatists attacked a travel agency in Bamenda, storming the area and firing at busses. No one was harmed in the incident. In Bafoussam, Cameroonian authorities pledged to take action to separatist incursions into West Region.
- On 29 August, separatist fighters invaded Ndop to enforce a lockdown. They blocked the road, destroyed a few vehicles and forced a few shops to close before retreating when security forces arrived.
- On 31 August, separatist fighters seized the corpse of a traditional ruler from a funeral in Donga-Mantung, holding it for several hours while demanding ransom.

== September ==
- Between 1–7 September, government soldiers killed at least four separatist fighters in Kumba.
- On 2 September, the new academic year started. Despite efforts by Cameroonian authorities and by individuals, the "back to school campaign" – an effort to reopen at least 4,500 schools that had been closed – failed due to the separatist-imposed lockdowns. Separatist fighters had already assaulted and wounded nine teachers, and separatists insisted that schools would not be allowed to reopen until Sisiku Julius Ayuk Tabe and the other jailed members of the Interim Government were freed. One place where the back to school campaign did appear to succeed was Nkambé. In Bamenda, militants fired at an ambulance.
- On 3 September, a journalist was abducted from a radio station in Buea by unidentified gunmen.
- Between 3–11 September, clashes left 11 people dead in Bui and Bamenda.
- On 4 September, a Cameroonian soldier was killed in a separatist ambush in Nchoubou, Bamenda. A Cameroonian officer claimed that four separatists were subsequently killed.
- Between 5–9 September, nine people were killed in Bali Nyonga, Bambui, Weh and Kumbo.
- On 6 September, it was reported that self-declared separatists had tortured and murdered a man for allegedly renting out his home to government soldiers.
- On 7 September, a government-imposed two-day lockdown came into force in Kumba, covering two days in-between separatist-imposed lockdowns. During the lockdown, several people were arrested by soldiers.
- On 9 September, suspected separatists abducted four bike riders in Limbe, allegedly for violating the separatist-imposed Monday ghost town that same day.
- On 10 September, President Paul Biya held a rare televised speech, during which he announced that the "Major National Dialogue" would take place before the end of the month. The dialogue, which he stressed would be "within the context of the constitution", would include the Anglophone Cameroonian diaspora, and efforts would be made to reach out to them. Biya also encouraged countries hosting separatist leaders to crack down on their activities. Biya's announcement was immediately rejected by the Southern Cameroons Liberation Council, with Ebenezer Akwanga stating that dialogue had ceased to be an option long ago, and that the separatists would only settle for independence.
- Between 12–19 September, government soldiers killed at least a dozen people in Muntengene and Munyenge.
- On 14 September, an official and a journalist were abducted by suspected separatists at the Cameroon Tribune compound in Bamenda. Elsewhere in Northwest Region, two Ambazonia Defence Forces soldiers, including a commander, were killed when the Cameroonian military ambushed them. The Ambazonia Governing Council confirmed the loss.
- On 16 September, a video emerged online where a woman was executed by suspected separatists in Guzang, Momo Division.
- On 20 September, separatist fighters launched a coordinated attack on a hotel in Bamenda where several government officials were staying. Security forces were able to repel the attack.
- On 24 September, government soldiers plundered the palace of the Fon of Bafut for three hours. During the attack, the Fon's brother was shot and wounded by the soldiers, who claimed to have been looking for armed separatists.
- On 25 September, a pro-separatist Muslim scholar from Bamenda was detained in Yaoundé. He was released on 1 November.
- On 28 September, a wardress at the Bamenda main prison was abducted. She was found decapitated two days later. In Bambili, Mezam Division, militants burned down a truck carrying humanitarian aid.
- On 30 September, the Major National Dialogue began. In Owe, Muyuka, five separatists were killed, including a commander known as Obi. Separatists confirmed the loss on social media.

== October ==
- 1 October marked the second anniversary of the Ambazonian declaration of independence, which was celebrated by a significant number of people in the Anglophone regions. Throughout the day, nine people were killed in armed clashes in Kumbo, Kikaikom, Mbveh, Kumba and Mamfe. In Lebialem, the Red Dragon militia began to force traditional rulers to flee from the subdivision, resulting in the deaths of at least two local traditional rulers. The leader of the Red Dragon militia, Lekeaka Oliver (popularly known as "Field Marshall"), subsequently declared himself Paramount Ruler of Lebialem. Over the next days, the Cameroonian Army made unsuccessful attempts to capture Oliver, and at least nine separatist fighters and a police officer were killed in the resulting clashes.
- On 3 October, a Catholic Education Secretary was abducted by armed men in Bamenda. As the Major National Dialogue neared its conclusion, President Paul Biya issued a decree that discontinued the court cases against 333 Anglophone activists.
- On 4 October, the Major National Dialogue was concluded.
- On 5 October, Cameroonian troops invaded Bali Nyonga, a separatist-controlled village. Hours of fighting left several people dead, including six who were identified as separatist fighters.
- On 8 October, ten separatist fighters from a camp in Bakassi reportedly surrendered to the Governor of Ndian Division.
- On 9 October, unidentified gunmen abducted two students and their father in Southwest Region.
- On 10 October, three students were abducted by unidentified gunmen in Bamenda.
- On 11 October, inter-separatist clashes in Guzang, Batibo left two dead.
- On 14 October, traditional rulers of Lebialem condemned Lekeaka Oliver of the Red Dragon militia for declaring himself Paramount Ruler of Lebialem. In Wum, separatist general Ekeom Polycarb publicly surrendered to the governor of Northwest Region, and encouraged his men to follow suit. In Tiko, separatist fighters mutilated at least 11 plantation workers and abducted another four.
- On 15 October, separatist fighters abducted some students from the Government Bilingual High School Nkambe, Donga Mantung Division. One of the students was released on 26 November.
- On 16 October, two students were briefly abducted by unidentified gunmen in Nkambe, but were freed by the army the same morning.
- Between 16–19 October, separatists killed two soldiers in Bamenda.
- On 17 October, Ambazonian general Ekeom Polycarp, who had publicly laid down his weapons three days prior, was killed in his home in Wum. The Cameroonian Army, which had been in the process of preparing a safe place for him to live, claimed that he had been assassinated by separatists. In Bamenda, separatists killed two members of a local vigilante committee who had appeared on TV the night before.
- By 18 October, separatists had opened nine "community schools" across the Anglophone regions, providing an alternative to the government-run schools which they had boycotted for years.
- On 18 October, a new Senior Divisional Officer was installed in Bui Division. Separatists attempted to disturb the brief ceremony, but were repelled by the army. In Lebialem, the Cameroonian Army raided camps belonging to the Red Dragon militia; it would later claim to have killed at least six separatists over the ensuing three days.
- On 20 October, a police officer was killed and decapitated in Bamenda. In Bamenda and Ndop, at least five separatist fighters were killed in clashes with Cameroonian soldiers. In Manyu Division, a Nigerian priest was abducted by unidentified gunmen who subsequently demanded ransom. The priest was released the following day. In Bombe Bakundu, Meme Division, seven people were killed in a raid by the Cameroonian military.
- On 21 October, separatists were reported to have attacked the convoy of Governor Adolphe Lele Lafrique in Kumbo. Following the attack, two civilians were injured by a roadside bomb that had been meant for the governor's convoy. The Cameroonian government later denied that there had been an attack.
- Between 22–26 October, six civilians and an unknown number of separatist fighters were killed in raids by the Cameroonian military.
- On 24 October, separatist fighters attacked a convoy that was transporting the Senior Divisional Officer of Meme Division. The fighters caused serious damage to some of the vehicles, but were eventually repelled.
- On 27 October, Patrick Ekema Esunge, Mayor of Buea, died in a hospital in Douala. While separatists claimed that someone had poisoned him, sources at the hospital claimed that it was likely a cardiac arrest.
- On 30 October, unidentified armed people set fire to a health centre in Buea, partly burning it down. The incident caused no casualties. In Bambili, Bamenda, heavy fighting took place around the University of Bamenda, where one civilian was injured by a stray bullet.

== November ==
- On 4 November, eight separatists were killed when Cameroonian forces ambushed their camp in Muyuka, including a commander known as Wazuzu. Several separatists were also wounded, while Cameroonian Army had no casualties. In Mbot, Nkambé, Cameroonian soldiers killed 12 motorcycle taxi drivers whom they claimed were separatists.
- On 5 November, militants attacked a school in Buea, but ran off when nearby security forces fired shots in the air.
- On 6 November, a suspected separatist fighter known locally as "Rati" was killed in Kumba.
- On 8 November, suspected separatists captured, tortured and killed a soldier in Muyuka. The abductors videotaped parts of the incident, where they announced that the killing was a response to the Cameroonian attack on a separatist camp in Muyuka on 4 November.
- On 9 November, one student was killed and another 12 were abducted from the University of Bamenda by unidentified gunmen. The police accused separatists of having carried out the kidnapping, while separatists denied being involved. In Ngo-Ketunjia, nine people were killed in clashes.
- On 10 November, gunmen suspected to be separatists abducted eight people and killed at least one person in Bamenda.
- On 11 November, it was reported that a former separatist general known as "General Nambere" had been photographed in Yaoundé together with another former separatist, a French diplomat and a journalist. This seemingly confirmed suspicions that General Nambere, who had escaped to Nigeria a year prior, had indeed abandoned the separatist cause. General Nambere was subsequently labeled a traitor by the separatists. In Widikum, separatist fighters ambushed gendarmes who were guarding the Divisional officer's house, killing one and wounding another. The fighters decapitated the dead gendarme before leaving. In Yoke, Muyuka, Cameroonian soldiers ambushed a separatist camp and arrested four men, all of whom they suspected of having participated in the torturing and killing of a soldier on 8 November.
- On 15 November, a soldier who was injured when his vehicle hit a road bomb in Kumba had his leg amputated. In Mamfe, Cameroonian soldiers invaded a neighborhood, killing one man in the process. Separatists alleged that French soldiers were fighting alongside the Cameroonian Army in Manyu, Lebialem and other areas.
- On 16 November, two government delegations started embarked on a mission in the Anglophone regions to win popular support for the conclusions of the Major National Dialogue. In particular, the delegations aimed to convince the populace that a "special status" for the Anglophone regions would address their grievances.
- On 19 November, a woman was buried alive after days of captivity in Kosala, Kumba. The body was exhumed two days later, and local authorities and security forces blamed separatist fighters for the murder.
- On 21 November, two people were killed in a Cameroonian raid in Menchum.
- On 22 November, a woman was abducted by armed men in Fundong. She was released on 24 November.
- On 20 November, the Rapid Intervention Battalion and members of a local vigilante group carried out a joint ambush on a separatist camp in Northwest Region. According to the Cameroonian Army, three hostages were freed during the raid and at least 10 separatists were killed.
- On 27 November, there were clashes in Bui, where Cameroonian soldiers had recently deployed in force. In Benakuma, separatist fighters killed one Cameroonian soldier and wounded another four. A journalist was also wounded. In Muea, Buea, Cameroonian soldiers killed five civilians.
- On 28 November, armed men abducted six students at the University of Bamenda. In Nkambé, Cameroonian soldiers stormed a separatist camp, reportedly killing several fighters.
- On 30 November, an aid worker employed by REDHAC was abducted and killed by unidentified militants in Donga-Mantung. In a statement, REDHAC condemned both the murder and acts of terror carried out by government-sponsored vigilante groups.

== December ==
- On 1 December, a Camair-Co passenger plane was fired at while it was landing at Bamenda Airport. Bullets penetrated into the cabin, but no one was wounded in the attack. This was the first attack on an aircraft in the Anglophone Crisis. The Ambazonia Governing Council quickly endorsed the attack, with its leader Ayaba Cho Lucas stating that the airline in question often transports soldiers, and that the separatists thus consider all incoming aircraft to be a security risk by default.
- On 3 December, separatists abducted three people in Bambili and Bamenda. They were released after a ransom had been paid.
- On 9 December, armed separatists abducted the mayor of Bamenda III, four councilors from Bamenda III and another 15 councilors from Jakiri. The separatists later declared that they would remain in custody until after the 2020 Cameroonian parliamentary election, which the separatists intended to boycott. Everyone were released on 18 December, after a ransom had been paid. Meanwhile, the Cameroonian Army launched a series of operations in Mezam, Boyo, Donga Mantung, Bui, Ngo Ketunjia and Boyo that would, over the next six days, force around 5,500 people to flee their homes.
- On 11 December, separatists ambushed a Cameroonian patrol in Widikum, killing at least three soldiers and wounding one. According to the separatists, 10 Cameroonian soldiers were killed in the attack, while according to the Cameroonian Army, the separatists were eventually pushed back in a counterattack. In Mamfe, one civilian was killed and another four were wounded during clashes between the army and separatists. The clashes continued into the following day, before coming to a halt.
- On 12 December, armed separatists abducted the mayor of Bamenda II. He was released on 18 December, together with 20 other officials who had been abducted on 9 December. According to the SDF, a ransom was paid for their release. In Kimbi, Boyo, Fulani vigilantes dressed in military uniforms burned down houses and killed villagers.
- On 15 December, the residence of SDF party chairman Joseph Mbah Ndam in Batibo burned down, possibly after separatists set it on fire.
- At some point in mid-December, there were clashes between separatists and ethnic Fulani in Bua Bua and Kimbi.
- On 16 December, one Cameroonian soldier was killed and another three were wounded in clashes with separatist fighters in Muyuka. In Bui Division, a house belonging to the mayor of Kumbo was burned down by suspected separatists.
- By 16 December, separatists had abducted at least 40 politicians as part of their effort to sabotage the 2020 election.
- On 17 December, at least 20 separatist fighters laid down their weapons to return to civilian life in Kumba. They were transported to the Buea Disarmament, Demobilization and Reintegration Centre the following morning.
- On 19 December, separatist fighters attacked a civilian truck near Ekona using firearms and roadside bombs, killing three civilians and wounding another 15. The truck was being escorted by Cameroonian soldiers, leaving it unclear whether the separatists had intended to attack civilians, soldiers or both.
- On 20 December, the Parliament of Cameroon passed a bill that granted a special status to Northwest Region and Southwest Region. The bill dealt with issues related to local autonomy, particularly in the field of education and common law. The bill was rejected by the separatists, who insisted that there would be no talks while the Cameroonian Army was still present in the Anglophone regions. The bill was also criticized by the Social Democratic Front, which favored a federal state over a special status for the Anglophone regions.
- On 22 December, a Cameroonian soldier who had been captured by separatists was found dead and decapitated.
- On 24 December, the Rapid Intervention Battalion arrested a humanitarian worker. He was found dead on 2 January 2020, with wounds indicating that he was subjected to torture.
- On 25 December, there were clashes in several places in the Anglophone regions. In Meme Division, three civilians were killed during clashes between separatists and Cameroonian soldiers. In Babessi, civilians fled to escape armed clashes. There were also clashes in Kumbo.
- On 28 December, seven civilians died during a Cameroonian raid in Donga-Mantung.
- On 30 December, the Cameroonian military detained an Anglophone journalist in Kumbo, accusing him of assisting separatist fighters in Bui Division. The journalist denied having any separatist connection. Security forces also carried out an operation against separatist forces in Bamessing. Separatist forces withdrew from the town, only to return days later when the Cameroonian soldiers had departed.
- On 31 December, former Ambazonian general Nambere Leonard and 86 others who had fled to Nigeria, were received Yaoundé Airport by Paul Atanga Nji, Minister of Territorial Administration. On the occasion, Nambere encouraged separatist guerrillas to lay down their weapons and be reintegrated into civilian life. In Donga-Mantung, suspected separatists abducted and killed a local business man, after accusing him of assisting the Cameroonian Army. In their respective New Year speeches, President Paul Biya of Cameroon and Samuel Ikome Sako of Ambazonia both promised to intensify the war in 2020.
