= Timeline of the Anglophone Crisis (2023) =

Conflict, started 2017, in Cameroon

This is a timeline of the Anglophone Crisis in Cameroon during 2023.

The Anglophone Crisis is an ongoing armed conflict in the Republic of Cameroon in Central Africa, where historically English-speaking Ambazonian separatists are seeking the independence of the former British trust territory of Southern Cameroons, which was unified with Cameroon since 1961.

== January ==
- On 1–2 January, following President Paul Biya's announcement in his New Years' speech that the Cameroonian military was crushing the Ambazonian rebellion, separatists moved to enforce local lockdowns. The Cameroon Armed Forces announced that it had deployed scores of troops to Oku, Kumbo and Jakiri, Northwest Region, and claimed to have killed 11 separatists. The Ambazonia Defence Forces (ADF) announced that the separatists had expanded their territorial grip and that the war would continue.
- On 4 January, a Cameroonian gendarme was killed by separatist fighters in Bamenda. The ADF claimed responsibility. In Bache, Akwaya, three people were killed and ten were injured in a separatist raid. The separatists accused the locals of assisting a Cameroonian raid on one of their camps a few days prior.
- On 5 January, locals in Ndoh Beach in Mbanga in Littoral Region complained that the army had effectively abandoned them, enabling separatists to attack the town with impunity. The Divisional Officer of Mbanga promised to reinforce security in the area. Separatist forces abducted 15 mourners in Ashong, Batibo subdivision in the Northwest Region.
- On 6 January, the 15 mourners who had been abducted by separatist forces were released.
- On 7 January, Cameroonian forces invaded a burial and opened fire killing a masquerade in Bambui.
- On 9 January, a Cameroonian soldier was shot dead by separatists who then seized his gun in the Northwest Region.
- On 11 January, a man claiming to be commander Zami of the Ambazonia Restoration Force was killed by Cameroonian forces during a gun battle in Kumba.
- On 12 January, sporadic gunshots were heard in Mile 5 Nkwen in Bamenda. The exact cause of the clashes is unknown but some locals claim it is following an attack on a gendermerie road patrol element. In Gayama near the Nigerian border, clashes between separatists and armed Fulani herders from Nigeria left at least 12 people dead, including the traditional ruler of Munkep, his son, and four other civilians. In addition, at least 20 civilians were injured, and some houses were burned down. Days later, Cameroon sent at least 100 soldiers to Gayama; many civilians fled for fear of getting caught up in clashes between separatists and Cameroonian troops.
- On 13 January, following an attack on Cameroonian forces in Mile 5 Nkwen in Bamenda, Cameroonian forces moved to invade the area and set on fire several shops and motorbikes. In Kumba, suspected separatist fighters killed a police officer.
- On 14 January, a military base around the Mamfe bridge was attacked and destroyed by separatist forces and several weapons and ammunitions were taken away. One soldier was killed during the attack. In a separate incident, three soldiers were killed during a separatist improvised explosive device (IED) ambush in Mbengwi.
- Between 10–17 January, ten soldiers were killed in various separatist attacks, four of whom were killed in Bamenda.
- On 18 January, separatists killed an election official in Bamenda.
- On 21 January, the government of Canada announced that the warring parties had signed an agreement to enter a peace process facilitated by Canada. The agreement was signed by the Cameroonian government, the Ambazonia Governing Council (and its armed wing, the ADF), the African People's Liberation Movement (and its armed wing, SOCADEF), the Interim Government of Ambazonia, and the Ambazonia Coalition Team.
- On 23 January, in reaction to the announcement of a peace process facilitated by Canada, Communication minister of Cameroon, René Sadi says the Government of Cameroon has not mandated any peace mediator or facilitator. Suspected separatist fighters stormed Mamfe and set a Total petrol station on fire.
- On 28 January, General No Pity resurfaced in a video after he had been out of the public view for several months. He said that "three truck loads" of soldiers had attacked his stronghold in Bambalang two days prior, only to be repelled with heavy losses. In Mamfe, separatist fighters burned down the village of Eshobi, killed one person and abducted another five. According to locals, Cameroonian soldiers stationed at a base in Eshobi watched the attack, but did not attempt to intervene.
- On 30 January, an ADF general known as General Mbula (born Orock Valentine) was killed by a military officer during a special military operation at Ekpor in Upper Banyang.
- On 31 January, Cameroonian forces killed Ambazonian rebel leader General Transporter and his loyal follower following a gun battle in Konye and displayed their corpses in public.

== February ==
- On 1–3 February, separatists carried out a string of attacks in Bamessing, Oku, Nkambe, Kumbo, Kom and Nkambe, using IEDs. The Cameroonian military said that several civilians were killed or abducted, while some military vehicles were also destroyed. Ambazonia Restoration Forces commander Sagon Jaguar said in a video that his forces had destroyed five military vehicles in Bamessing using IEDs. Capo Daniel from the ADF said that separatists had increased their IED attacks to avenge the killing of "General Transporter" on 31 January.
- On 3 February, suspected separatists shot and killed a man in Alakuma, Bamenda.
- On 5 February, three separatist fighters were killed and two Cameroonian soldiers were injured, one seriously during clashes in Baba I. In Bambui, Social Democratic Front (SDF) Member of Parliament Wainachi Nentoh Honourine was abducted by armed men, who went on to demand 36 million CFA francs for her release.
- On 10 February, separatists imposed a lockdown in Bamenda, which was largely respected by the population on the eve of the Youth Day celebration. Several explosions were reported in the town, for which the separatists claimed responsibility. In Tiko, six CDC workers were killed by separatist fighters for defying a separatist-imposed ghost town.
- On 16 February, a Cameroonian soldier was killed in a separatist attack against a Brasseries du Cameroun truck escorted by the army in Kumba. In Nkambé, a teacher was killed by separatist fighters for participating in the Youth Day celebration, five days ago.
- On 20 February, a teenager in Bali was beheaded by suspected separatist fighters, who accused her of revealing separatist hideouts.
- On 21 February, seven bodies were found in Ndop after a day of heavy battles between Cameroonian forces and separatists. The Cameroonian Army said 15 separatists had been killed in Ndop alone in February, and that at least 30 had been killed elsewhere in Northwest Region. The Cameroonian Army also said that 15 separatists had surrendered. The ADF said it had killed 38 Cameroonian soldiers since Paul Biya had announced the 12 March Senate election.
- On 25 February, nineteen athletes were wounded in multiple explosions during the Mount Cameroon Race of Hope. The Ambazonia Defence Forces (ADF) claimed responsibility, saying that their primary target had been Cameroonian elite forces.
- On 26 February, separatists killed a driver and set his vehicle ablaze in Mmouck-Leteh in Lebialem.
- On 28 February, a woman victim of the Mount Cameroon Race of Hope explosions, that took place three days ago died at the hospital. She was severely injured alongside her three children.

== March ==
- On 6 March, it was reported that Cameroonian forces had raided and dismantled a separatist camp in Buea that had been led by "General Black Rapen", arresting a number of men and dismantling six IEDs.
- In the days leading up to the 12 March, Cameroon senatorial election, separatists blocked roads and carried out a string of lethal attacks against military vehicles. Battles were recorded in Tadu, Bamenda, Ndop, Wum, Jakiri, Oku, Bambili, Sabga, Mamfe, Menji and Tiko. The Cameroonian Army said that two dozen separatists had been killed, while acknowledging the loss of several military vehicles. The SDF said that the clashes had made it impossible for its candidates to campaign.
- On 27 March, separatist fighters attacked a military helicopter in Ngarbuh, severely injuring two soldiers.
- On 29 March, Cameroonian forces entered a market in Kumbo to search for separatist fighters, but they were ambushed by separatists who attacked their position with a rocket-propelled grenade (RPG). An armored vehicle also hit a land mine. At least one separatist fighter was injured in the fighting, while Cameroonian army losses could not be verified. Following the fighting, Cameroonian forces burned down and looted several shops in the market.

== April ==
- On 5 April, at least three separatist fighters were killed in a Cameroonian ambush in Nforyah, Bafut.
- On 6 April, local officials said that throughout the past week, armed men had abducted at least 25 people from villages in the Ako district, near the border with Nigeria. Officials believed that armed Fulani from the Nigerian side were responsible. Hundreds of people had fled from the affected villages.
- On 10 April, one person died and at least four vehicles were set ablaze during a separatist attack in Buea.
- On 11 April, three separatists were killed in a military ambush in Babessi.
- On 22–23 April, separatists killed four civilians in Mbei, Santa.

== May ==
- On 1 May, separatist fighters attacked a checkpoint in Matouke, Littoral Region, killing five soldiers or police officers and one civilian, and wounding many others. The separatists seized soldiers' clothing, weapons and ammunition before heading back into bordering Southwest Region. A small group of separatists from Ambazonia Liberation Council claimed responsibility. The attack was regarded as notable because Matouke is located less than 40 kilometers from Douala, the economic capital of Cameroon. In Mamu near Ekona, Muyuka, at least six people were killed and more were wounded in a raid by the Cameroonian Army.
- On 7 May, a journalist was killed by separatist fighters in a bar in Bamenda. Former AGovC activist Capo Daniel said that the separatist fighters had mistaken the journalist for someone else.
- On 11 May, a soldier from the Rapid Intervention Battalion was killed during a separatist attack in Ndop.
- On 16 May, three soldiers from the Rapid Intervention Battalion were killed in a separatist IED ambush in Mabonji, on the outskirt of Kumba. An armed separatist militia known as the Reborns claimed responsibility. In Mundemba, 18 armed separatists surrendered to Cameroonian authorities, including commanders David Dibo ("General Baron") and Ekpe Jerome ("General JB"). The fighters revealed that they had been operating from Nigerian territory, which had become more difficult due to Cameroonian cross-border raids and actions by Nigerian authorities. Cameroonian authorities called this the largest surrender in a single instance to date.
- On 17 May, a teacher and his wife were abducted by separatists from Ambazonia Defence Forces in Yelum. They were abducted shortly after the writing of the government common entrance examination which took place six days ago, other teachers were released.
- On 18 May, separatists attacked a military checkpoint killing two gendarmes and abducting one in Tombel. A civilian was shot in the leg during clashes between soldiers and separatists.
- On 19 May, separatists injured several women in Big Babanki protesting against monthly levies imposed by separatists. Cameroonian soldiers subsequently entered Big Babanki, and separatists carried out a failed IED attack. Following the incident, separatists declared a curfew in Big Babanki, banning crowds and any outdoors activity after 6pm.
- On 20 May, an improvised explosive device (IED) detonated in Buea during The National Day celebrations. Six officials and teachers who had participated in National Day celebrations were abducted in Momo. In Big Babanki, Mezam, civilians who protested against separatist-imposed war levies were shot in the legs by armed separatists.
- On 22 May, the North West Regional Councillor and others were kidnapped by the Ambazonia Defence Forces in Ngie after taking part in 20 May celebrations.
- On 24 May, it was reported that separatists had abducted 30 women in Babanki days prior. Separatist activist Capo Daniel confirmed the abduction, stating that the women were being punished for "allowing Cameroon's administration to manipulate them". All the women were released the same day as the incident was first reported, many with serious injuries; a local source said that some had gunfire wounds and that one might require an amputation.
- On 25 May, four soldiers were killed in a separatist IED ambush in Belo.
- On 26 May, Cameroonian troops invaded Big Babanki to search for separatist fighters. According to locals, the troops soon began looting shops and burning down houses. In Bambui, Cameroonian soldiers tortured four civilians with knives.
- On 29 May, Mbashie Sylvester aka "General Shina Rambo" of the Bambalang Marine Forces (brother of General No Pity) surrendered to Cameroonian authorities. In Muyenge, two separatist fighters were killed when the Rapid Intervention Battalion raided their camp.
- On 30 May, one of the frontline organisers of the All Anglophone Conference (ACC), and leading activist of the Southern Cameroons National Council Barrister Sam Ekontang Elad died.
- On 31 May, a Rapid Intervention Battalion lieutenant was killed in a separatist IED ambush in Mbengwi.

== June ==
- On 1 June, traditional ruler Fon Kevin Shumitang II abducted in 2021 by separatists under the orders of General No Pity was released. The Cameroonian Army claimed to have rescued the fon in a military operation, while the separatists said that the fon had been exchanged for 15 members of General No Pity's family whom the Cameroonian government had arrested.
- On 6 June, two soldiers were killed in an IED ambush in Ekondo-Titi.
- On 7 June, separatist commanders Felix Kibam ("General Slow") and Benard Kuh ("Oga Landlord") surrendered to Cameroonian authorities in Fundong.
- On 8 June, a Gendarmerie Brigade Commander was killed in a separatist ambush in Bamenda.
- On 12 June, Cameroonian troops launched a military operation in Belo, killing two separatist fighters, searching homes and stationing soldiers in the village. Separatist fighters withdrew into the surrounding hills.
- On 14 June, separatists blocked the Bamenda-Boyo road in Big Babanki, in response to the deployment of Cameroonian troops in Big Babanki three days prior. A police officer was killed and three others were injured during a separatist attack on a police station in Balikumbat.
- On 16 June, six civilians were arrested and then summarily executed by Cameroonian forces in Big Babanki. Another dozen were killed by soldiers as they attempted to flee from Big Babanki.
- On 22 June, three villagers were killed by Cameroonian forces who set their corpse on fire in Big Babanki.
- On 24 June, Cameroonian forces killed five men and set several houses on fire in Ekona.
- On 26 June, gendarmes killed a separatist fighter and a civilian in Kumba.

== July ==
- On 4 July, Cameroonian forces invaded Mejang in search of separatist fighters and allegedly set several houses and the palace on fire, killing two women.
- On 5 July, two inhabitants of Kombone Bakundu were killed by separatists in Boa Bakundu shortly after being kidnapped.
- On 6 July, a man was killed in Essimbi by separatists who accused him of having links with the military.
- On 8 July, a soldier was killed by separatists in Bamenda.
- On 12 July, Cameroonian forces launched two operations in Mbonge subdivision killing three separatists. During the operation, a makeshift house was set on fire, one person was arrested and ammunition seized. Several construction workers were kidnapped by separatists at a construction site of a science laboratory at Government Bilingual High School in Ndop.
- On 13 July, suspected separatist fighters burnt a section of John Fru Ndi's house in Baba II.
- On 14 July, the Nkum Council was burnt down by unidentified individuals in Tatum. Cameroonian troops killed five civilians in Bamenda.
- On 16 July, gunmen killed ten people and injured another two at a busy junction in Bamenda. Seven of the dead were from West Region. Without claiming responsibility for the attack, Ayaba Cho Lucas declared that henceforth, whenever Cameroonian forces killed Anglophone civilians, the ADF would retaliate by killing civilians from the Francophone parts of Cameroon.
- On 19 July, one person died in an explosion in Bamenda.
- On 20 July, a man was killed in Bamenda.
- On 24 July, separatists killed two policemen and one gendarme officer in Ekok.
- On 26 July, three separatist fighters were killed by the Cameroonian Army in Ndop.

== August ==
- On 5 August, suspected separatists burned down the Bamenda residence of a politician from the Cameroon People's Democratic Movement (CPDM). One of the arsonists got trapped by the flames and burned to death, while another sustained injuries and was hospitalized.
- On 6 August, Cameroonian forces ambushed and killed two separatist fighters in Bafut, including former Seven Karta commander "General Tiger".
- On 7 August, Cameroonian forces killed five separatist fighters in Boppo including ''General T. Lion'', destroyed their camp and seized weapons and charms.
- On 8 August, security forces deactivated an IED in Bamenda.
- On 9–10 August the Nigerian Army 82nd Division carried out operations against the Eastern Security Network (ESN) and weapons smugglers in Cross River State, arresting in the process five Ambazonian gunrunners.
- On 11–12 August, four civilians were killed during a separatist attack on the villages of Kekukesim I and II, Akwaya. Houses were also burned, and several villagers are reported to be missing.
- On 18 August, two militants of the Cameroonian Party for National Reconciliation (CPNR) were killed in Mamfe.
- On 29 August, a separatist fighter known as ''General'' Christopher Elejuma was killed during a military operation in Akwaya while five others espaced with bullet wounds. During the operation, three weapons, ammunitions of various calibres, black unifoms, drugs and solar devices were seized by Cameroonian forces.
- On 31 August, armed men shot dead a security officer in Bamenda.

== September ==
- On 1 September, Cameroonian forces reportedly killed a suspected separatist and dumped his body in Kumba.
- On 3 September, three soldiers were killed by separatists in Kumbo. Two head teachers were killed in an alleged separatist attack in Mbessa. Inhabitants in Bamenyam in West Region protested against the abduction of some villagers by suspected separatists.
- On 4 September, a student was killed by a stray bullet during clashes in Kumba.
- On 5 September, several soldiers were injured and others were feared dead after separatists detonated an IED on a military truck in Alou. A civilian passenger also died in the attack. A separatist militia known as "The Team Retina" claimed responsibility for the attack.
- On 6 September, the ADF and the Bui Unity Warriors took over a border control in Lus, neighboring Nigeria and burned an armored car.
- On 7 September, three people were killed and two cars were burned down as separatists enforced a lockdown in Buea. Gunshots were also heard in multiples neighborhoods of the city. The Fako Mountain Lions claimed responsibility for the attack.
- On 8 September, one person was killed and dozens injured in a suspected separatist attack in Limbe.
- On 11 September, Cameroonian forces attacked a separatist hideout in Bamenda, killing two fighters. In Bafut, separatists burned a truck after the driver had disregarded a lockdown.
- On 13 September, separatist fighters killed a civilian in Belo for selling drinks to Cameroonian soldiers.
- On 15 September, two civilians were killed by separatists in Mile 16, Buea for having disregarded a separatist-imposed lockdown. In Kumbo, a separatist fighter escaped from detention, and killed a gendarme during the escape.
- On 17 September, gunmen killed four PAMOL workers in Lobe, Ekondo-Titi. Cameroonian soldiers stormed the market of Kedjom Keku and killed two civilians.
- On 19 September, the Cameroonian Army raided a separatist hideout in Mofako Butu, Meme and killed five separatist fighters, including "Field Marshall Bitter Kola", Communication Secretary of the Ambazonia People Liberation Council (APLC) and leader of the movement's forces in Fako.
- On 23 September, Cameroonian forces attacked a hideout of a separatist militia called the British Southern Cameroon Resistance Force (BSCRF) in Fundong, killing its commander "General RK" and six other fighters.
- On 28 September, separatists attacked a gendarmerie post and killed the commanding gendarmerie officer in the Awing locality. The separatists claimed to have captured another gendarme during the attack, and to have seized weapons.
- On 30 September, the Bamenda 3 Council Hall (belonging to the SDF) was burned down in a suspected arson attack.

== October ==
- On 1 October, three separatist fighters were captured by villagers in Ekonge, Nguti, and handed over to Cameroonian forces.
- On 4 October, Cameroonian forces freed 11 captives from a separatist hideout in Kikaikom, Bui.
- On 5 October, the ADF publicly executed two men by firing squad in Guzang, Batibo. The two had been accused of collaborating with Cameroonian forces.
- On 6 October, Cameroonian forces ambushed and killed at least four separatist fighters at their hideout in Kendem, Manyu.
- On 7 October, separatists in Ndop abducted a funeral procession, holding the corpse of a dead forester and 12 family members for two days before releasing all for ransom. A separatist group called the "Black Lions of Bamali" claimed responsibility.
- On 15 October, it was reported that Cameroonian forces had attacked a separatist hideout in Obonyi III, Akwaya, killing six fighters.
- On 26 October, separatist fighters killed a Cameroonian soldier in Weh, Northwest Region.
- On 29 October, Cameroonian forces raided Furu Awa and a separatist hideouts in Mbalangui, killing three and two fighters, respectively (two of whom were top commanders). In Besali, Lebialem, Cameroonian forces ambushed separatists who were transporting hostages, killing four separatist fighters. Two hostages were killed during the confrontation.
- On 31 October, suspected separatists abducted nine people in Big Babanki, accusing them of being collaborators, and set fire to some houses.

== November ==
- On 4 November, a separatist fighter was killed in Egbekaw, Mamfe, allegedly by Nigerian mercenaries who had been hired by villagers to protect the crossborder Boki community.
- On 6 November, separatist fighters carried out the Egbekaw massacre, killing at least 20 civilians, injuring another 10, and setting some 15 houses on fire in the Egbekaw, near Mamfe. Local sources reported more than 30 dead, many of whom were burned alive in their sleep. At least 15 people were abducted, and an unspecified number were raped. Cameroon News Agency reported that a group known as the "Tigers of Manyu" was responsible for the attack, and had carried it out as revenge for the death of one of their fighters two days prior. The perpetrators were reported to be natives of Egbekaw.
- On 11 November, Cameroonian forces raided a separatist hideout in Nguri, killing six fighters including a commander. Hours later, a Cameroonian soldier was killed in a separatist attack in Bamenda.
- On 12 November, three Cameroonian soldiers were killed in a separatist ambush in Belo.
- On 21 November, gunmen killed nine civilians and injured several others in an attack in Bamenyam, West Region.
- On 24 November, separatist fighters killed a schoolgirl during a failed attempt to abduct her father.
- On 25 November, separatist fighters were blamed for an attack on Nigerian actor Sylvester Madu that killed five people and injured several others in Bamenda.

== December ==
- On 5 December, Ambazonian separatists reportedly took control of the Belegete community inside Nigeria (in Obanliku), and abducted some 30 people including traditional leader Chief Francis Ogweshi. Two days later, Nigerian troops attempted a rescue mission in the jungle, during which an Ambazonian fighter was killed. The Ambazonians responded by killing the chief, whose corpse was discovered three days later. Ambazonian forces carried out subsequent attacks in Belegete, where they burned houses and attacked civilians with guns and cutlasses. Nigerian forces were later deployed to oust the Ambazonians, but they were unable to reach Belegete with a sizeable force due to the topography and the poor infrastructure, and camped at the Obudu Mountain Resort. The rebels later retreated from Belegete on their own, but threatened that they would return at a later date.
- On 12 December, separatist fighters abducted eight students from a school in Esu, Menchum. The students were rescued on the same day by Cameroonian forces.
- On 14 December, suspected separatists killed three civilians and burned down houses in Malende. In Bai Panya, Meme, at least three separatist fighters were killed in a Cameroonian ambush. Separatist losses included a commander known as "General Ayuk".
- On 17 December, Ambazonian separatists invaded and terrorized the Okwa community in Boki, in Nigeria's Cross River State.
- On 20 December, three soldiers and two gendarmes were killed in a separatist IED attack in Wum. Cameroonian forces subsequently attacked Mbankong village and environs, allegedly killing and arresting civilians.
- On 24 December, separatist fighters abducted and then later killed a civilian in Bali Nyonga.
- On 25 December, an IED detonated in a marketplace in Bamenda. There were no casualties.
- On 27 December, Cameroonian forces allegedly captured two separatists in Bali Nyonga.
