= July 2019 Cameroon prison riots =

Two prison riots in Cameroon

Kondengui and Buea prison riots
- Part of the Anglophone Crisis
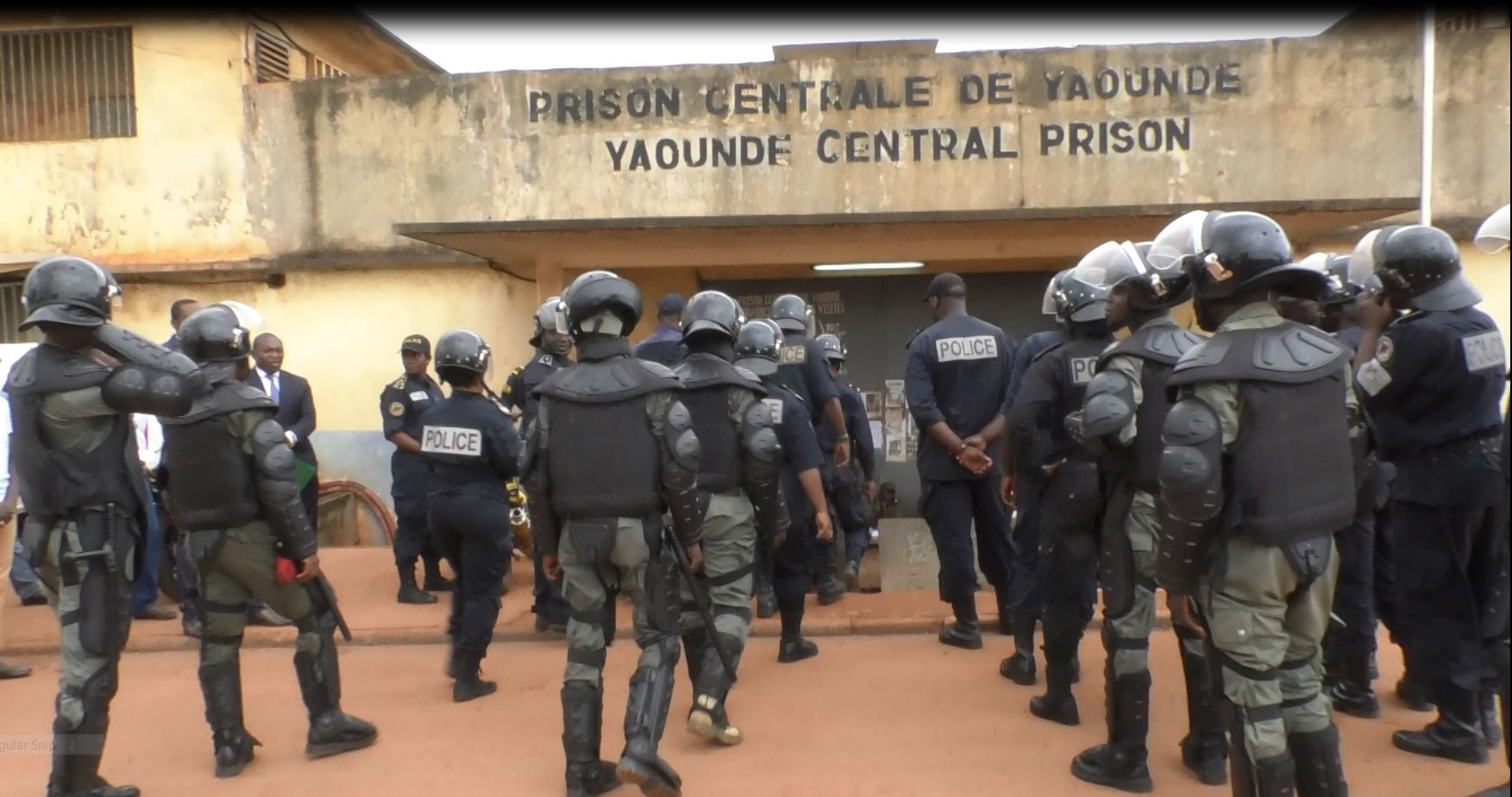
- Riot police enter Kondengui Central Prison
- Date: July 22 and 24, 2019
- Deaths: Unknown
- Injuries: Unknown
- Perpetrators: Inmates of various backgrounds, including separatists and political prisoners
- Motive: Poor prison conditions, war in Anglophone regions, demands for release

The Kondengui and Buea prison riots occurred on July 22 and 24, 2019, respectively. While the first riot started off as a protest against poor prison conditions and unjust detainment, the second riot was carried out in support of the former. Both riots were violently quelled by security forces, and hundreds of prisoners were transported to undisclosed locations. The fate of these prisoners and rumors of casualties during the crushing of the riots had political implications in the ongoing Anglophone Crisis, and brought international attention to the prison conditions. Following the riots, many suspected participants were subjected to torture, and were brought to court and sentenced without their lawyers present.

== Riots ==
=== Kondengui ===
On July 22, Ambazonian detainees at Kondengui Central Prison staged a protest against the prison conditions and the war in the Anglophone regions. The protest soon escalated into a riot, with over 600 Ambazonian and Cameroon Renaissance Movement (CRM) inmates taking over the prison yard, forcing the guards to pull out. The rioters also made a failed attempt to breach the special quarters.

The riot was live-streamed on Facebook by several inmates. In some videos, separatist inmates could be heard singing the Ambazonian national anthem. In one video, a political prisoner from the CRM stated that "We no longer want to eat maize porridge".

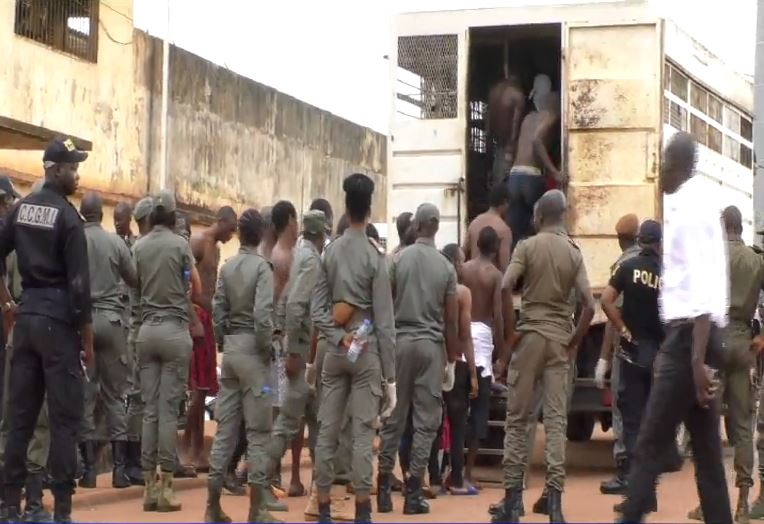
Prisoners being transferred out of Kondengui Central Prison to undisclosed locations on July 23.

After several hours, security forces moved in to regain control of the prison yard. Shots were fired during the quelling of the riot, and some buildings were set on fire. Several prisoners were injured, and Cameroon's main opposition party claimed that four inmates had died. More than 100 inmates were moved to undisclosed locations for detention.

=== Buea ===
On July 24, around 100 inmates at Buea Central Prison, acting in solidarity with their fellow detainees at Kondengui, staged a protest of their own. There as at Kondengui, security forces used live ammunition while quelling the riots.

== Aftermath ==
Following the Kondengui riot, Amnesty International called on Cameroon to improve the prison conditions in Kondengui, and to allow an independent investigation of the crackdown on the riot. Human Rights Watch was later able to document that many of the detainees had been tortured. Many were brought to court and charged for rebellion, and in some cases their lawyers were not allowed to enter the courtroom.

The riots and their aftermath drew strong reactions from Ambazonian separatist movements. On July 26, the two competing factions of the Interim Government of Ambazonia (split since the 2019 Ambazonian leadership crisis) issued statements regarding the riot at Kondengui. The faction loyal to Samuel Ikome Sako gave Cameroon five days to account for the inmates who had been missing following the riot at Kondengui; if it failed to do so, the separatists would enforce a "total lockdown" where "nothing enters and nothing leaves" the Anglophone regions, starting on July 30. The faction loyal to Sisiku Julius Ayuk Tabe (who had been detained at Kondengui for more than a year), supported by the Ambazonia Governing Council, refrained from making any ultimatums, declaring instead that a lockdown would be imposed on July 29 and 30 regardless of Cameroon's actions. As announced, a lockdown came into effect on July 29.

On July 30, the ten detained members of the Interim Government of Ambazonia, including Sisiku Julius Ayuk Tabe, declared that they would go on a hunger strike until their lawyers could verify the whereabouts of all convicts who had been missing since the riots. The hunger strike was to start at midnight the same day. The same day, the Cameroonian government made its first public statement on the riots, declaring that no detainees had been killed, and that some were being held for investigation. This declaration fell short of the Ayuk Tabe cabinet's demands, and the hunger strike was thus initiated.
