= Ivo Mbah =

Ambazonian general (died 2018)

- Died: December 21, 2018; Teke, Kumba, Cameroon
- Military career
- Allegiance: Ambazonia
- Branch: Ambazonia Defence Forces
- Service years: 2017–2018
- Rank: General
- Conflicts: Anglophone Crisis

Ivo Mbah (died 21 December 2018) was an Ambazonian general who fought in the Anglophone Crisis. Reportedly one of the first separatists to go to war against Cameroonian authorities, he fought for more than a year before he was killed in combat with the Cameroonian Armed Forces.

== Biography ==
Recruited by a man who went by the nom de guerre "General Divine", Ivo Mbah was one of the first Ambazonia Defence Forces members, and was popular among his fellow separatists. His followers reportedly believed that he possessed "mystical powers", and Mbah worked with these beliefs, stating in propaganda videos that "no man born of a woman could kill him". According to the Cameroonian military, he commanded more than 30 ADF camps throughout the Anglophone region by 2018. He mainly operated at Matoh and Teke in Meme department.

=== Death ===
In the morning on December 21, 2018, Ivo went to Teke, a locality in Kumba, to be present during his driver's wedding. According to the Cameroonian military, his attendance was leaked to the Cameroonian Army, and special forces moved in to assassinate the general. Dressed in civilian clothing, the soldiers moved in to with the intent of capturing the general alive, but a firefight broke out when separatist fighters recognized the soldiers. Ivo took refuge inside a building, where the soldiers pursued him. After an intense fight that involved close combat, the general was killed. Minutes after his death, pictures and videos of his dead body were published on social media. Other sources have stated that Mbah was killed by a local anti-separatist vigilante group or by a rival separatist force.

== Impact and legacy ==
The killing of Ivo was a significant achievement for the Cameroonian government forces, and a blow to the morale of the separatists. However, the assassination was not a complete success story for the Cameroonian government; the plan had been for Ivo to be captured alive, and use him for intelligence gathering. Instead, he died without giving up any information. The killing also had a detrimental effect for the recently formed disarmament and reintegration programme.

Several separatist leaders wrote tributes to the general. Ayaba Cho Lucas described him as "the finest and bravest that Ambazonia could hope for". Samuel Ikome Sako, Acting President of the Interim Government of Ambazonia, wrote that he personally admired Ivo for his bravery, and that his death was a great loss to the nation.

In May 2022, the ADF abducted CPDM Senator Regina Mundi. The ADF offered to exchange her with 75 political prisoners and threatened to execute her if Cameroon did not comply. The ADF further stated that alternatively, they could trade her dead body for the body of Ivo Mbah.
