= Wirba Joseph =

Cameroonian politician, humanitarian and social activist

Wirba Joseph Mbiydzenyuy
- Born: 8 January 1960 (age 66); Jakiri, British Cameroon
- Occupation: Parliamentarian

Wirba Joseph Mbiydzenyuy (born January 8, 1960), is a Cameroonian politician, humanitarian and social activist.

== Early life and education ==
Wirba Joseph Mbiydzenyuy was born into the household of the warriors of Mbisha-Kwe'ebiri, Rohntong, in Jakiri, Bui Division of British Cameroons. His parents Mama Theresia Biy and Papa WIRBA Dor did not have his birth officially recorded as he was born in a rural setting having neither a health facility nor birth records, at a time when women were assisted by traditional birth attendants (the ma'nkoiy). He was delivered at his family home, before, on, or about January 8, 1960.

Joe began his primary education at the local primary school in Kinsenjam, he then continued his education in a secondary school in Bamenda and completed high school in Nkambe.

After graduation, Joe got admitted into the University of Yaounde, Where he majored in Comparative Literature, the Teaching of Literature in English and English as a Second Language.

== Political career ==
On May 26, 1990, Wirba Joseph and an inner circle of leaders worked to bypass, frustrate and push back the army in order to successfully launch the Social Democratic Front (SDF), the main Cameroonian opposition party. Wirba was an active participant and advocate for the freedom of the people of West Cameroon in the All Anglophone Conference that was held in Buea, on April 2 and 3 1993, with follow-up meetings on April 29 to May 1, 1994 in Bamenda. Wirba remain a devoted member of the SDF and in September 2013, Joe Wirba won a landmark election in Jakiri in September 2013 to become a Member of Parliament for Jakiri Special Constituency since.

Wirba Joseph was the first Cameroonian parliamentarian to raise the 2016–2017 Cameroonian protests, which would later escalate into the Anglophone Crisis. He eventually abandoned his party's policies and came to support the independence of Ambazonia. Fearing for his safety, he fled to Nigeria in early 2017. He briefly returned and reappeared in parliament, but soon fled the country once again, this time to the United Kingdom. In January 2019, he published a book called "Wirbaforce", which is his personal tribute to those who had lost their lives in the Anglophone Crisis.

Wirba believes that the creation of the Interim Government of Ambazonia in October 2017 was a mistake, calling it an "imaginary structure" that paved the way for the 2019 Ambazonian leadership crisis. Wirba has also revealed that he had been contacted by Ambazonian president Sisiku Julius Ayuk Tabe and asked to assume leadership of the revolution, which he declined.
