= Ambazonian leadership crisis =

Interim Government of Ambazonia conflict

- Part of the Anglophone Crisis
- Date: 2 May 2019 – present
- Caused by: Infighting, alleged failures of the Sako-led cabinet
- Status: Interim Government divided, with four people claiming to be the President of Ambazonia

Parties
Cabinet led by Sisiku Julius Ayuk Tabe ("Nera 10"); Supported by: Ambazonia Governing Council (AGovC)	Cabinet led by Samuel Ikome Sako; Supported by: Ambazonia Restoration Council (until February 2022) Cabinet led by Chris Anu (from September 2022)	Ambazonia Restoration Council (from February 2022)

Casualties and losses
Unknown	Unknown	Unknown

The Ambazonian leadership crisis is an ongoing internal conflict within the Interim Government of Ambazonia (IG). The crisis started on 2 May 2019, when a document signed by the first president of Ambazonia, Sisiku Julius Ayuk Tabe, acting from detention in Yaoundé, declared the dissolution of the cabinet of interim president Samuel Ikome Sako and the restoration of Ayuk Tabe's cabinet. This effectively led to the existence of two interim governments, with neither recognizing the other.

In February 2022, Sako ordered the suspension of the Restoration Council, the legislative arm of his own Interim Government. The Restoration Council subsequently impeached Sako, and later announced that Marianta Njomia had replaced Sako. The Ambazonian movement thus found itself with three people claiming to be president.

== Background ==
Following the arrest of the Ayuk Tabe cabinet in January 2018 in Nigeria, Samuel Ikome Sako was elected the acting president of the Interim Government. His presidency saw attempts to unite the separatist camp under one roof (notably the creation of the Southern Cameroons Liberation Council in April 2019), but faced criticism for alleged incompetence, divisiveness and misappropriation of funds.

== Ayuk Tabe–Sako split (2019–2022) ==
On 2 May 2019, Ayuk Tabe – still in prison – declared that the Sako-led cabinet had been dissolved, and that the cabinet led by himself had been restored. While the document recognized the Sako cabinet for its sincere efforts, it claimed that it was ultimately not fit to continue;

Considering that despite all efforts by well-meaning Ambazonians responding to my appeals to keep the Interim Government afloat by accommodating the caretaker cabinet while these issues of infighting in the struggle involving grave improprieties both in the management of material and human resources are sorted out, the caretaker cabinet has lost the ability to reconcile our people and, in doing so, has imperiled the identity and mission of the interim government to complete the decolonization of Southern Cameroons through advancing our collective national interests.

It is incumbent on me as a servant-leadership fiduciary to bring redress to the Southern Cameroons-Ambazonians, to their struggle and their nation, from their slow descent into a footnote of our own history.

I hereby declare and direct that the caretaker cabinet is forthwith dissolved and that, the cabinet as was in office on January 5th 2018, when myself and parts of the leadership were abducted be reconstituted, restored and reactivated.

At some point after making this declaration, Ayuk Tabe reached out to former SDF parliamentarian Wirba Joseph, asking him to assume leadership of the revolution. Wirba declined the request, believing the Interim Government to be an "imaginary structure" and detrimental to the cause.

However, the Sako-led cabinet did not recognize Ayuk Tabe's authority to dismiss the interim cabinet, and consequently refused to step down. In June 2019, the Ambazonia Restoration Council "impeached" Ayuk Tabe for "treasonous misconduct", and declared that he had lost his mandate to speak on behalf of Ambazonia.

The leadership crisis complicated the already delicate allegiances among Ambazonian separatist movements. The Ambazonia Governing Council (AGovC), which traditionally has had a complicated relationship with the Interim Government, voiced support for Ayuk Tabe. Wirba Joseph called the impeachment of Ayuk Tabe "absurd". In November 2019, pro-separatist sources reported that Sako and his supporters had changed his title from Acting Interim President to President, aiming to permanently replace Ayuk Tabe even if the latter would ever be released.

On 13 October 2020, Ayuk Tabe called from prison in Yaounde to settle the dispute and cooperating against Cameroon. President Ikome Sako reiterated his refusal to recognize Ayuk Tabe's cabinet, stating that "there is only one Interim Government". He further insisted that Ayuk Tabe declare the dissolution of his cabinet before any reconciliation could take place.

== Split within the pro-Sako faction and AGovC (2022–present) ==
In February 2022, Sako ordered the suspension of the Restoration Council, the legislative arm of the Interim Government. The Restoration Council subsequently impeached Sako, thus widening the long-running Ambazonian leadership crisis. Meeting in Washington DC, 10–13 March 2022, the second Ambazonian Stakeholders Strategic Conference upgraded the Restoration Council to an Interim House of Representatives elected from the 13 counties of Ambazonia and reaffirmed support of Sako as President of Ambazonia. Meanwhile, the Restoration Council, declared Marianta Njomia as Sako's replacement.

On September 10, 2022, long-term IG spokesperson Chris Anu (brother of deceased separatist general Lekeaka Oliver and former Sako loyalist) declared himself President of Ambazonia. Consequently, the separatist movement found itself with four claimants for president.

In early 2023, the AGovC also experienced a splintering when the group's deputy Capo Daniel left to create his own independent factions. Though Daniel and the rest of AGovC, led by Ayaba Cho Lucas, initially appeared to have parted amicably, Capo Daniel began to openly challenge Lucas over the next months. In June 2023, the former deputy declared himself "the new leader of the war for the liberation of Ambazonia" and denounced Lucas.

By late 2023, researcher Alex Purcell argued that the leadership crisis involved various infighting groups, though the inter-rebel clashes were mainly fuelled by the conflict between "two pairs of protagonists", namely "Sako/Anu" and "Ayaba Cho/Nyih": Roughly ten major militias supported Sako and/or Anu, while Ayaba Cho and his Vice President Julius Nyih were mainly backed by the Ambazonia Defence Forces (ADF).

On January 1, 2024, Ayuk Tabe wrote a letter calling for an end to the leadership crisis and unity among separatist factions.

== Consequences ==
Purcell has argued that the leadership crisis, alongside the rebel militias' growing abuses, "Odeshi, substance abuse, and illusory superior titles", has made it increasingly unlikely that the Ambazonian rebels will win their rebellion. Instead, the insurgent movement has devolved into "disparate, warring factions".

=== Effects on negotiations with Cameroon ===
The leadership conflict led to the seeming emergence of two governments, an elected leadership under president Sako in the Diaspora and a putative leadership under Ayuk Tabe in Yaounde, each claiming legitimacy. This paradigm shift may have complicated and delayed the prospect of direct talks with the Cameroonian government. During the later half of 2019, Switzerland emerged as mediator for peace talks between Ambazonian nationalists and the Cameroonian government. On 22 September 2019, the Sako faction of the IG brought together leaders and representatives of 10 Ambazonian nationalist movements to create the Ambazonia Coalition Team (ACT), or Team Ambazonia and a “joint platform for negotiations” with the Cameroon government. The following talks in Switzerland were boycotted outright by the Ayuk Tabe faction, while the AGovC questioned whether Switzerland was truly neutral. In July 2020, Cameroonian officials met with Ayuk Tabe to discuss a ceasefire absent any international mediator or guarantor. The Sako-led government responded to the meeting by declaring that prisoners cannot negotiate. The AGovC, which had supported Ayuk Tabe against Sako, took a similar stance.

By 2023, researchers Gordon Crawford and Maurice Beseng argued that the division within the Ambazonian exile leadership was a major obstacle to any further peace negotiations, a view shared by Alex Purcell.

=== Relations with Nigeria ===
The leadership crisis resurfaced in mid-2021, when pro-Ayuk Tabe AGovC announced an alliance with the Indigenous People of Biafra (IPOB), a Biafran independence movement. Sako denounced the alliance on grounds of the importance of goodwill from Nigeria, and argued that AGovC had put the hundreds of thousands of Anglophone refugees in Nigeria at danger. The Sako-led government preferred instead to repair relations between Ambazonia and Nigeria. The AGovC fired back, stating that "those who liberated Rwanda came from refugee camps in Uganda" and that "Nigeria has shown itself not to be our friend". IPOB also denounced Sako's claim to the Ambazonian presidency, declaring him one of many "traitors and selfish fellows".

=== Effects on the war zone ===
Sako's impeachment by the Restoration Council in February 2022 coincided with an escalation of infighting on the ground, as the ADF had already begun to fracture. Given the autonomous nature of many armed groups, the causation between the leadership crisis and infighting within the IG remains a matter of debate. Conversely, Purcell considered the leadership crisis as a major factor in the inter-rebel clashes.

By 2023, the infighting among the exile leadership and the protracted nature of the insurgency had dimmed support for a continued armed separatist campaign among civilians in the war zone.
