= Nacho Junction massacre =

2023 attack in Cameroon

- Part of Anglophone Crisis
- Location: Nacho Junction, Bamenda, North West Region, Cameroon
- Date: 16 July 2023; 7:30pm
- Target: Civilians from the West Region
- Deaths: 10
- Injuries: 2
- Perpetrator: Ambazonia Defence Forces

The Nacho Junction massacre was the killing of ten civilians at Nacho Junction, Bamenda, Northwest Region, Cameroon, on 16 July 2023. Both the Ambazonia Defence Forces (ADF) and the Cameroonian government traded blame for the massacre.

== Background ==
The Anglophone Crisis began in 2017, when English-speaking separatists in the northwestern and southwestern regions of Cameroon declared independence due to allegations of persecution by the French-speaking government. Originally beginning as a low-level insurgency, the Cameroonian government established control over the major cities while the Ambazonian rebels controlled much of the countryside and a few villages by 2020. By 2022, both sides regularly launched raids on the territories of one another.

In July in Bamenda, the capital of Northwest Region, tit-for-tat raids were ongoing between ADF militants and the Cameroonian government. Between 1 and 4 July, three Cameroonian soldiers were killed near Bamenda; government forces responded by killing two women in Mejang on 5 July and three separatists in Mbonge on 12 July. On 14 July, five young men, described by relatives as civilians, were killed by Cameroonian forces in the Nacho neighborhood of Bamenda.

== Massacre ==
At about 7:30pm local time, twelve armed men exited several vehicles at Nacho Junction, a busy place with bars, restaurants, and other nightlife. The men, dressed in Cameroonian military uniforms, ordered locals to lie on the floor. Some people were dragged out of their homes by the militants. Those who obeyed were shot. One witness said that while telling people to lie on the floor, the gunmen accused the locals of failing to back the separatists. Another said that the gunmen were looking for residents of Mbouda, West Region, which shares a border with North West region. The reason for West Region in particular was, according to what a militant told a witness, people from the West Region had given up the hideout of their compatriots to the Cameroonian military. Twelve people were shot at; ten were killed in the massacre. Seven of the victims were men, and three were women. After shooting the victims, the perpetrators drove off.

The Cameroonian military released a statement on 17 July denying responsibility and blaming separatists. The military accused the separatists of wearing Cameroonian military uniforms to deflect blame. Northwest Governor Adolph Lele Lafrique called the perpetrators "terrorists" and accused separatists of conducting the massacre. The mayor of Bamenda, Achombong Paul, said that residents were living in fear. Prominent elites in West Region protested the massacre.

ADF spokesman Lucas Asu said that there was a possibility that the massacre was a revenge killing, but denied responsibility. Another separatist commander, Wo Scandy, denied responsibility. Later, ADF commander Ayaba Cho Lucas said that the killings were perpetrated by the ADF after the ADF found out the previous day's killing of five young men, four of whom were students.
