= Movement for the Restoration of the Independence of Southern Cameroons =

MoRISC
- Logo
- Chairperson: Boh Herbert
- Ideology: Ambazonian nationalism Ambazonian separatism

The Movement for the Restoration of the Independence of Southern Cameroons (MoRISC) is an Ambazonian independence movement. In March 2019, it participated in the All Southern Cameroons People's General Conference in Washington, D.C., and took part in forming the Southern Cameroons Liberation Council.

While MoRISC supports an armed struggle, it has been critical of excessively long "ghost towns". When separatist fighters initiated a ten-day ghost town in Buea in February 2019, MoRISC criticized them for causing misery for civilians.
