= Capo Daniel =

Ambazonian separatist and political activist

- Born: Ngong Emmanuel
- Military career
- Allegiance: Ambazonia
- Branch: Ambazonia Defence Forces (?–2023); Ambazonia Dark Forces (from 2023)
- Rank: Ambazonia Defence Forces deputy commander and spokesman (until 2023)
- Commands: Ambazonia Dark Forces
- Conflicts: Anglophone Crisis: Operation Bui Clean
- Other work: President of the "Ambazonia People's Rights Advocacy Group"

Ngong Emmanuel, better known by his pseudonym Capo Daniel, (Note: Alternatively written Daniel Capo, Daniel Caapo, or mononymously as Capo) is an Ambazonian separatist and political activist who served as member of the Ambazonia Governing Council (AGovC) and deputy commander of the Ambazonia Defence Forces (ADF) until 2023. Following his resignation from the AGovC and ADF, fighters loyal to him formed the Ambazonia Dark Forces. In 2024, he called for an end to the armed struggle. Daniel has generally operated from exile in Hong Kong.

== Biography ==
Cameroon's Anglophone regions have long been the subject to a separatist movement calling for the establishment of a state termed "Ambazonia". In the 2016–17 Cameroonian protests, calls for separatism reached a new height, fuelled by militant online activists. Ngong Emmanuel adopted the pseudonym "Capo Daniel" and became one of these early militant online activists, with notable others being Mark Bareta Barra, and Tapang Ivo. In September 2017, tensions escalated into a civil war known as "Anglophone Crisis" between the Cameroonian government and Ambazonian separatists. Daniel became a member of one rebel political faction, the Ambazonia Governing Council (AGovC), and was appointed deputy commander and spokesman of the Ambazonia Defence Forces (ADF), an alliance of separatist militias. Over the course of the civil war, Daniel has been mainly based in exile in Hong Kong. A Cameroonian loyalist and lawyer, Christopher Nsalai, made repeated though unsuccessful attempts to force the government of Hong Kong to extradite Daniel to Cameroon.

Daniel seemingly maintains a Facebook page and a YouTube channel, using them to spread separatist announcements and propaganda. However, journalist Zane Irwin pointed out that the tone between Daniel's Facebook and YouTube presence differed considerably, speculating that the two were possibly not run by the same person. (Note: Irwin considered it possible that the "Capo Daniel" Facebook page was actually run by "Fimba", an anti-separatist online activist who was well known for virtual identity theft to undermine separatist activities.) Despite living in exile, Daniel has seemingly been involved in directing separatist military operations. He has occasionally been described as an Ambazonian "general".

In 2020, elements of the Ambazonian separatists allowed the reopening of local schools in the Anglophone regions. These had previously been targeted by the rebels as Francophone institutes of the Cameroonian state. Daniel was among those rebels who expressed opposition to the school reopenings. He stated that his forces would only permit "community schools that have been approved by the Ambazonia Governing Council education board. We shall not tolerate any alien institution any longer. Our forces on the ground shall enforce this order". In 2021, forces associated with Daniel fought in Operation Bui Clean.

In 2022, Human Rights Watch attempted to contact several Ambazonian leaders to complain about crimes against civilians committed by rebel forces. Only Daniel responded to HRW; he apologized for an attack on the Cameroon Baptist Convention Health Services by the ADF and an allied militia, the "Buffaloes of Bali", but also stated that he considered the kidnapping of Senator Regina Mundi by the ADF as a legitimate operation.

In April 2023, Daniel resigned from AGovC and, by extension, the ADF, in order to pursue independent activism. He publicly declared that disagreements with the rest of the AGovC and ADF leadership had made it "impossible for me to continue serving our Liberation Movement in those capacities", though clarified that he continued to support and involve himself in the separatist rebellion. AGovC leader Ayaba Cho Lucas acknowledged his resignation and thanked him for his years of work. By May, Daniel had become President of the "Ambazonia People's Rights Advocacy Group" and founded a new militant group called the Ambazonia Dark Forces. He openly called on his fighters to abduct journalists for ransom. He explained this policy as a reaction against allegedly hostile journalism after separatists had "accidentally" killed Anye Nde Nsoh, the regional bureau chief of The Advocate newspaper. By June, Daniel was openly criticizing Ayaba Cho Lucas for obstructing negotiations between the Cameroonian government and the rebel forces; he subsequently declared himself "the new leader of the war for the liberation of Ambazonia".

In a statement released in May 2024, Daniel called for an end of the armed struggle against Cameroon and a switch to nonviolent resistance. Daniel said that the struggle had failed both militarily and diplomatically, and that pending negotiations, fighters should only use their weapons in self-defense. On 7 January 2025, the Bamenda family home of the Daniel was burned down. He blamed separatist fighters from Bui for this attack.
