= Major National Dialogue =

Part of the Anglophone Crisis in Cameroon

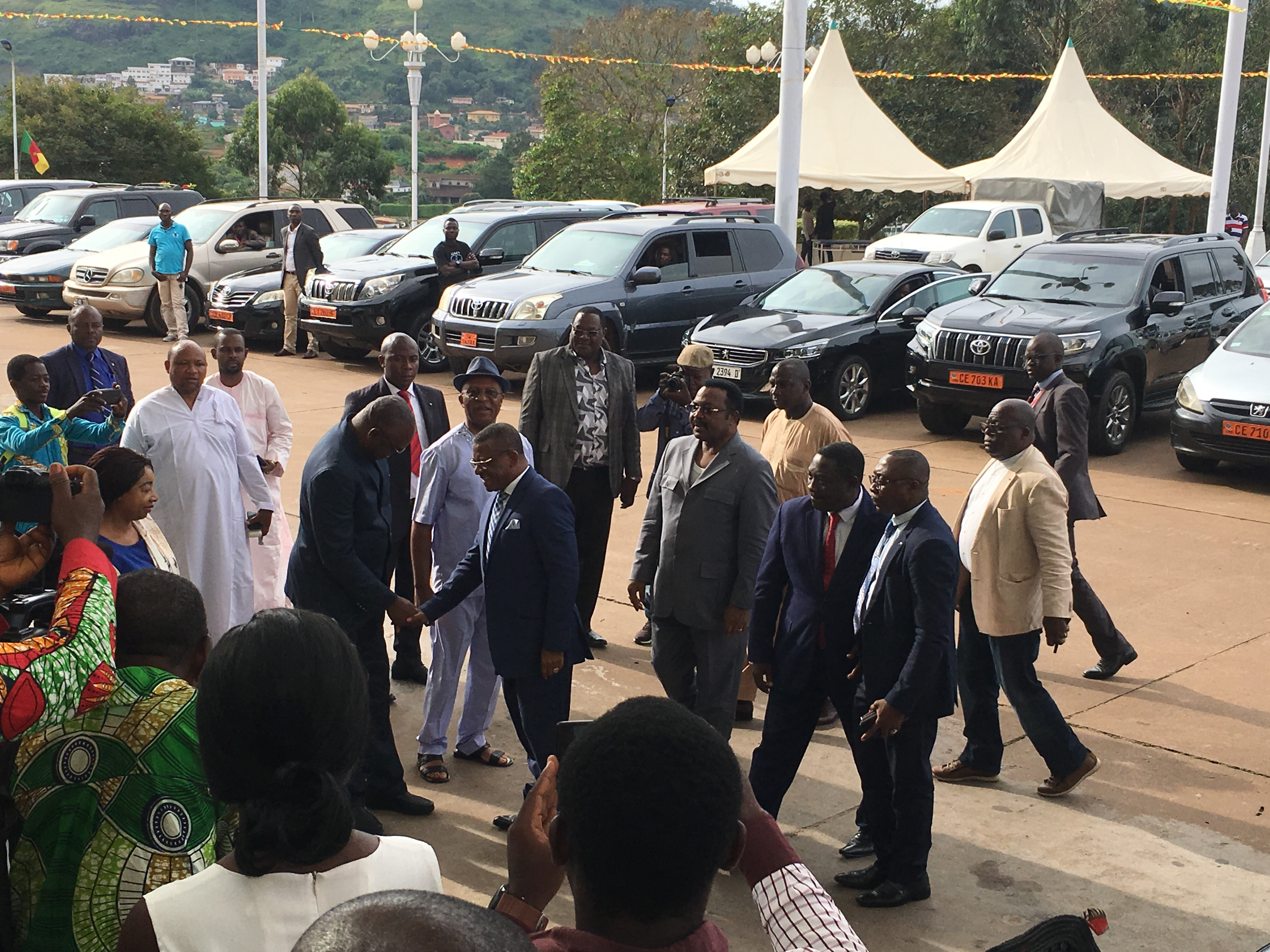
Joseph Dion Ngute, Prime Minister of Cameroon, visits the plenary hall of the Palais des Congrès in Yaoundé on Sept. 29, 2019, on the eve of the Major National Dialogue.

The Major National Dialogue (French: Grand dialogue national) is the official name of a dialogue between the Government of Cameroon and various opposition parties, aimed at resolving the Anglophone Crisis. The event took place between September 30 and October 4, 2019.

== Background ==
For decades, Anglophone Cameroonians in the area formerly known as Southern Cameroons had resented the central government for marginalizing them. In October 2016, major protests broke out in cities in the Anglophone regions. The Cameroonian government responded by deploying soldiers to quell the protests. Six weeks into the demonstrations, six demonstrators had been killed and more than 100 had been arrested. In September 2017, Anglophone separatists began to take up arms against the Cameroonian government, and on October 1, the Southern Cameroons Ambazonia Consortium United Front declared the independence of the Federal Republic of Ambazonia. The situation evolved into a military conflict including human rights violations called the Anglophone Crisis.

=== Negotiations ===
On September 10, 2019, President of Cameroon Paul Biya announced in a televised speech that a "grand national dialogue" would take place before the end of the month. The dialogue would take place "within the context of the constitution", hence ruling out Ambazonian independence, and would include the Anglophone Cameroonian diaspora. A government website was subsequently launched, where people could submit proposals ahead of the dialogue.

== Course of the dialogue ==
=== September 30 ===
The dialogue started with an opening ceremony, where former separatist fighters sang the Cameroonian national anthem. Afterwards, Prime Minister Joseph Ngute challenged the attendants to "make history" and find solutions to "the problems that have separated us physically and intellectually in recent years".

=== October 1 ===
Debates started fully on the second day of the dialogue. Eight commissions had been named, each focusing on a particular issue; one for multiculturalism and bilingualism, one for the educational system, one for the judicial system, one for the question of refugees, one for reconstruction, one for disarmament, one for the diaspora and one for decentralization.

At the end of the second day, Barrister Akere Muna of the "Now Movement" declared that he would withdraw from the dialogue unless the form of state would be discussed.

=== October 2 ===
The third day had the same focus as the second day. Barrister Felix Agbor Balla declared that the dialogue would be pointless unless the form of state was discussed, insisting that decentralization would be insufficient.

=== October 3 ===
On the fourth day, the commissions submitted their recommendations to the Prime Minister. As the Major National Dialogue neared its conclusion, President Paul Biya issued a decree that discontinued the court cases against 333 Anglophone activists.

Responding to the presence of separatist generals as the dialogue, the Ambazonia Self-Defence Council issued a statement claiming that these separatists were fake.

=== October 4 ===
On the fifth day, final resolutions were read. The decentralization commission proposed a special status for the Anglophone regions, as well as more local autonomy. Other recommendations included the construction of an airport and a seaport in the Anglophone regions, the renaming of the country to the "United Republic of Cameroon", measures against corruption, and an intensified effort to rehabilitate former separatist fighters.

== Outcome: Special status for Anglophone regions ==
In December 2019, the National Assembly of Cameroon passed legislation, granting "special status" to the Northwest and Southwest regions giving them additional rights and responsibilities in relation to economic, health, social, educational, sports and cultural development. Under the special status the regions would each have a bicameral Regional Assembly, made up of a 20-member House of Chiefs composed of traditional leaders and a 70-member House of Regional Representatives nominated by municipal councils. The Regional Assembly would appoint a Regional Executive Council which is led by the President of the Regional Assembly and includes a vice president, three commissioners, two secretaries and a questor. Additional powers over health and education were also granted to municipalities in both regions.

== Reactions ==
=== Reactions to the announcement ===
==== Within Cameroon ====
===== Support =====
- The United People for Social Renovation supported the initiative. Its leader Serge Espoir Matomba met with the Prime Minister ahead of the dialogue to submit his proposals.
- The Cameroon People's Party submitted its own proposals and views to the Prime Minister ahead of the dialogue.
- Felix Agbor Balla, President of the Centre for Human Right and Democracy, supported the initiative, but stressed that separatists should be given a guarantee that they would not be arrested if they showed up.

===== Conditional support =====
- The Social Democratic Front offered conditional support of the initiative, demanding a ceasefire and amnesty to all separatists who had been jailed. The party also declared that the dialogue should be chaired by a neutral third party, suggesting the United States, the United Kingdom or Germany. Later, the SDF accused the ruling CPDM party of sending a disproportionate number of representatives to the dialogue.
- Cardinal Christian Tumi, Archbishop Emeritus of Douala, stated that Ambazonian independence should not be ruled out from the onset.

===== Opposition =====
- The Cameroon Renaissance Movement declared that it would not participate unless its leader Maurice Kamto was released from jail. Kamto had been in jail since the immediate aftermath of the 2018 Cameroonian presidential election, in which he had claimed victory. This demand was eventually met after the dialogue had taken place.

==== Separatist response ====
- The Southern Cameroons Liberation Council, an umbrella movement of several Ambazonian separatist groups, including the Interim Government of Ambazonia, immediately dismissed the dialogue as insincere, citing the recent life sentences handed to Sisiku Julius Ayuk Tabe and other detained separatist leaders. Ebenezer Akwanga stated that it was far too late to talk about reforms, and that the separatists would only settle for independence.
  - Despite this, separatist fighters from Fako Division agreed to participate through a telephone conference.

=== Reactions at conclusion ===
The ruling CPDM party welcomed the recommendations from the commissions. Some attendants criticized the structure of the dialogue, as well as the fact that separation was not debated as an alternative. Others characterized the five-day event as a sham. The separatists reaffirmed their rejection of the dialogue, promising to step up the war.

In December 2020, the United Nations urged the government of Cameroon to address the issues that had been brought up at the Major National Dialogue and to continue the dialogue process with all parties involved. François Loucemy Fall, Head of the UN Regional Office for Central Africa, stated that "the implementation of the recommendations from the major national dialogue, in addition to continued dialogue with all parties, remains crucial to building lasting peace and development".

== Aftermath ==
The day after the conclusion of the dialogue, President Biya ordered the dropping of the cases of some supporters of the Cameroon Renaissance Movement, including its leader Maurice Kamto. This move was directly linked to the Major National Dialogue. On November 16, two government delegations started embarked on a mission in the Anglophone regions to win popular support for the conclusions of the Major National Dialogue. In particular, the delegations aimed to convince the populace that a "special status" for the Anglophone regions would address their grievances. This resulted in the "General Code of Regional and Local Authorities", which was passed by the Cameroonian parliament on December 18, 2019.

The war in the Anglophone regions intensified in the weeks following the dialogue. Maintaining its military approach to resolving the crisis, the Cameroonian government began to focus on creating local vigilante groups to fight the separatist guerilla. The separatists intensified their guerilla war against Cameroon, notably by assassinating a separatist general mere days after he had laid down his arms.
