= Ambazonia Defence Forces =

Ambazonian separatist group

- Seal of the Ambazonia Defence Forces
- Founder: Ambazonia Governing Council
- Leaders: Julius Nyih (Interim C.I.C, 2024-present); Ayaba Cho Lucas (C.I.C, 2017-2024); Benedict Nwana Kuah (Chairman of ADF Council); Former: Capo Daniel (deputy defense chief, 2017-23)
- Dates active: 2017 – present
- Country: Cameroon
- Allegiance: Ambazonia Governing Council
- Active regions: Northwest and Southwest Cameroon
- Ideology: Ambazonian nationalism, Ambazonian separatism
- Size: 1,500 (according to the ADF; as of July 2018); 200–500 (according to independent sources; by 2019)
- Part of: Ambazonia
- Wars: Anglophone Crisis

The Ambazonia Defence Forces (ADF) are a military organization that fights for the independence of Ambazonia, a self-declared state in Cameroon’s Anglophone regions (the Northwest and the Southwest, formerly known as Southern Cameroons). It was formally established by the Ambazonia Governing Council (AGovC) on 9 September 2017, the same day as the organization declared a war of independence.

Whereas other separatist militias have refrained from bringing the war outside the Anglophone regions, the ADF has taken a different stance. Since April 2021, the ADF has been allied with the Indigenous People of Biafra and its armed wing, the Eastern Security Network. Furthermore, then-AGovC leader Ayaba Cho Lucas declared in 2021 that if Cameroonians rise up against the government of Paul Biya, the ADF will support them militarily.

== History ==
The ADF has been fighting a guerrilla war against the Cameroonian Armed Forces in the Anglophone part of the country since September 2017. In June 2018, it claimed to have 1,500 soldiers under its command, spread across 20 bases across Southern Cameroons. Numerically and materially the inferior of their adversary, they rely on hit-and-run attacks, ambushes and raids, taking advantage of their familiarity with the terrain. The ADF aims to raise the cost of Cameroon's military presence in the region higher than the profits the country gets from there. Cameroonian authorities have acknowledged that they have little control outside the cities in Southern Cameroons; according to a foreign journalist who spent time with the ADF, this owes partly to the poor infrastructure in the region, making it hard for the army to pursue the guerrillas.

The ADF is loyal to the AGovC, which is not part of the Interim Government of Ambazonia. In the early phase of the war, this led to a complicated relationship between the ADF and the Interim Government, which initially did not endorse an armed struggle. On November 9, 2017, the Interim Government condemned ADF attacks that killed three gendarmes. The Interim Government's nonviolent stance changed in early 2018, opening the possibility of cooperation between it and the ADF. The ADF has declined offers to be integrated into the Ambazonia Self-Defence Council, an umbrella organization established by the Interim Government to unite all separatist militias under one banner. Following the death of General Ivo Mbah in December 2018, President Samuel Ikome Sako praised the deceased general and urged all separatist militias to "ignore our minor differences" and unite.

In March 2019, an ADF leader announced that they would take the war into the French-speaking parts of Cameroon. A week later, separatists - possibly the ADF - raided Penda Mboko, Littoral Region, and injured three gendarmes. This was in defiance of the policy of the Interim Government, which has stressed that the war should take place solely within the borders of Southern Cameroons.

In late-August 2019, the ADF announced that a half-year lockdown was being planned. This was in response to the life sentences that had just been handed to Sisiku Julius Ayuk Tabe and nine other detained separatist leaders by the Yaoundé Military Tribunal.

After at least five instances in January 2020 where angry villagers attacked separatist camps, the ADF openly condemned war crimes committed by fellow separatists. ADF fighters were given orders to arrest anyone caught terrorizing civilians, including fellow separatists. Later in the month, the Southern Cameroon Restoration Forces, led by General Chacha, abducted 40 ADF fighters, six of whom were executed.

When SOCADEF declared a 14-day ceasefire at the end of March 2020 because of the COVID-19 pandemic, the AGovC said that the ADF would do the same if Cameroonian troops were confined to their bases for the duration of the ceasefire.

As a response to Operation Bamenda Clean, the ADF called on locals to rise up against the Cameroonian army.

In March 2021, "General Efang" of the ADF publicly apologized to the population for war crimes committed by some separatist elements. He claimed that separatist fighters abusing civilians were often under the influence of drugs, and lamented that this had led to the creation of pro-government local paramilitaries.

On April 9, 2021, the AGovC formally entered into an alliance with the Indigenous People of Biafra (IPOB) and its armed wing, the Eastern Security Network (ESN). According to ADF deputy defense chief Capo Daniel, this would entail joint military operations, joint training bases, and an effort to seize the mutual border and ensure a free flow of weapons. By April 2022 this had been partly achieved, as Ambazonian forces and the ESN had consolidated their control over much of the common border and brought 90 percent of cross-border trade to a halt. The alliance was denounced by the Interim Government of Ambazonia as well as by other Biafran separatist groups.

In April 2023, Capo Daniel resigned from AGovC and, by extension, the ADF, in order to pursue independent activism. Ayaba Cho Lucas acknowledged his resignation and thanked him for his years of work. By May, Daniel had founded a new militant group called the Ambazonia Dark Forces, and openly called on his fighters to abduct journalists for ransom.

In July 2023, Cho Lucas declared that henceforth, whenever Cameroonian forces killed Anglophone civilians, the ADF would kill Francophone civilians. The AGovC leader added that "when Cameroon begins to respect the Geneva Convention, we will do the same".

On January 21, 2024, it was confirmed that Cameroonian forces had captured top ADF commander "General Efang", who had been wounded in action two weeks prior. This marked the second time that the ADF lost its top ground zero commander.

On September 24, 2024, Cho Lucas was arrested in Norway on "charges based on his various expressions on social media." Days later, AGovC vice president Julius Nyih (based in the Republic of Ireland) became the interim leader of AGovC, and effectively replaced Ayaba as the C.I.C of the ADF. He vowed to continue the armed struggle.

On September 5, 2025, Benedict Nwana Kuah and Pascal Kikishy Wongbi were arrested in Minnesota, United States, and charged with conspiracy to kill, kidnap, maim and injure persons in Cameroon; and conspiracy to launder money. Benedict Nwana Kuah faces additional charges of conspiring to use weapons of mass destruction in Cameroon.

== See also ==
- List of Ambazonian militant groups
