= Southern Cameroons Liberation Council =

Ambazonian umbrella movement founded in 2019

- Established: March 31, 2019
- Ideology: Big tent Ambazonian separatism (factions); Federalism (factions)

The Southern Cameroons Liberation Council (SCLC) is an Ambazonian umbrella movement, aiming to unite all Anglophone groups on a common front. As of April 2019, it consists of seven movements.

== Foundation ==
The SCLC was established at the All Southern Cameroons People's General Conference in Washington, D.C. The conference was open to both separatists and federalists, and was attended by the Interim Government of Ambazonia, the Southern Cameroons National Council, Southern Cameroons Civil Society Consortium, Republic of Ambazonia, the African People's Liberation Movement and MoRISC.

The Ambazonia Governing Council did not participate in the conference, with its leader Ayaba Cho Lucas describing the organizers as "enablers".

== History ==
One of its first actions was to declare an early end to a lockdown in Fako Division, citing how it mainly affected civilians. However, the Ambazonia Self-Defence Council, the armed wing of the Interim Government, challenged the decision, claiming that the SCLC did not have the authority to call off the lockdown.

The SCLC dismissed the Major National Dialogue as insincere.
