= Public holidays in Cameroon =

This is a list of holidays in Cameroon

== Fixed ==
| Date | English name | Notes |
|---|---|---|
| January 1 | New Year's Day | |
| February 11 | Youth Day | Commemorates the unification in 1961 and honors young people. |
| May 1 | Labour Day | |
| May 20 | National Day | Cameroon replaced its federal structure on May 20, 1972. |
| August 15 | Assumption Day | |
| December 25 | Christmas Day | |

== Movable holidays ==
The following holidays are public holidays but the date on which each occurs varies, according to its corresponding calendar, and thus has no set date.

| Date | English name | Description |
|---|---|---|
| Friday before Easter | Good Friday | Crucifixion of Jesus |
| 39 days after Easter | Ascension Day | Ascension of Jesus into Heaven |
| 1 Shawwal | Korité | Celebrates End of Ramadan |
| 10 Dhu al-Hijjah | Tabaski | Celebrates Feast of Sacrifice |

== See also ==
- Nigeria
