= Ayaba Cho Lucas =

Ambazonian activist (born 1972)

Ayaba Cho Lucas (S.G)
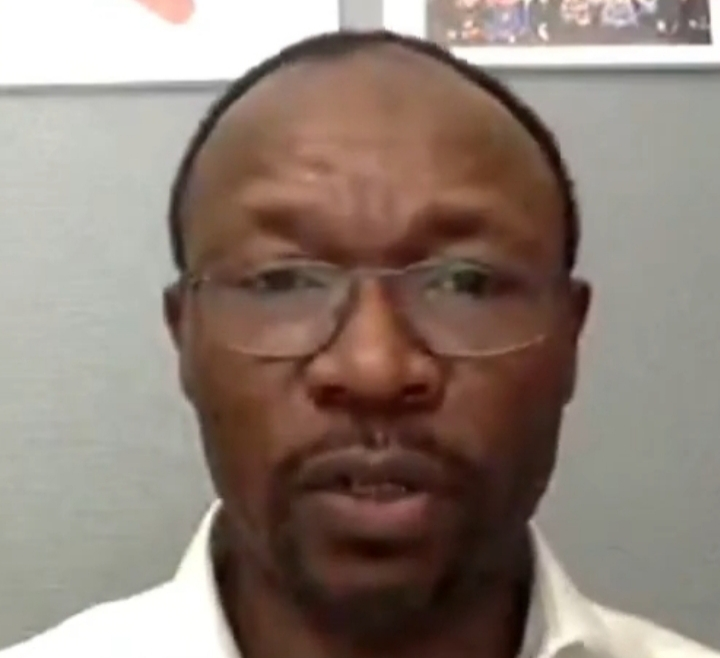
- Ayaba Cho Lucas in 2022.
- Born: Ayaba Cho Lucas; 25 August 1972 (age 54); Northwest Region, Cameroon
- Education: University of Buea (did not graduate)
- Occupation: Leader of the Ambazonia Governing Council

Ayaba Cho Lucas (born August 1972) is an Ambazonian activist. He is the former Secretary General of the Southern Cameroons Youth League (SCYL) and served as leader of Ambazonia Governing Council (AGovC), a separatist organization in Southern Cameroons that has an armed wing, the Ambazonia Defence Forces (ADF). He was arrested in Norway in September 2024 and charged with incitement of crimes against humanity.

== Early life and exile ==
Ayaba was expelled from the University of Buea in 1993 because he had led a one-man demonstration against tuition increases; he has been in exile from Cameroon since then. He eventually ended up in Norway, where he studied human rights and development at the Norwegian University of Life Sciences, and from where he has based his activism ever since.

In January 2017, Ayaba was allegedly targeted for assassination in Brussels, Belgium.

== Anglophone Crisis ==
As leader of the AGovC, Ayaba and Chairman Benedict Kuah oversaw the creation of the Ambazonia Defence Forces, which carried out its first guerilla action on September 9, 2017. This was the first armed action by Ambazonian separatists in what would become known as the Anglophone Crisis. This happened seven weeks before the Interim Government of Ambazonia was established, and months before it endorsed an armed struggle.

The AGovC's relationship with the Interim Government was oftentimes strained. In March 2019, Ayaba refused to attend the All Southern Cameroons People's General Conference in Washington, D.C., calling some of the attendants "enablers". The AGC did thus not become part of the Southern Cameroons Liberation Council. During the 2019 Ambazonian leadership crisis, Ayaba supported Sisiku Julius Ayuk Tabe against Samuel Ikome Sako "out of principle". Ayaba argued that it was wrong to attack Ayuk Tabe, who had been in detention since January 2018.

In July 2019, Ayaba claimed that Cameroon had practically lost the war and that separatist forces controlled 80 percent of the Anglophone regions.

On April 9, 2021, Ayaba held a joint press conference with Nnamdi Kanu, leader of the Indigenous People of Biafra (IPOB), where they declared an alliance between Biafra and Ambazonia. Ayaba also proposed an alliance with opposition forces within Cameroon, proposing that Ambazonia should help overthrow Paul Biya.

In March 2022, Ayaba Lucas Cho presented himself, on his Twitter page, as the sponsor of a terrorist attack on Ekondo Titi, which caused the death of seven people, including the sub-prefect and the mayor of this city, in the Southwest region of Cameroon.

On September 24, 2024, Ayaba was arrested in Norway on "charges based on his various expressions on social media." He could face 30 years in prison if convicted. Days later, AGovC vice president Julius Nyih became the interim leader of AGovC. He vowed to continue the armed struggle. On November 19, 2024, the Norwegian justice system extended his detention until January 14, 2025. Lucas Cho Ayaba's legal team, however, announced that they would appeal his detention. In January 2025, the Organization of Emerging African States (OEAS) called for the release of Ayaba and Simon Ekpa, a Biafran political activist.

A court case against Ayaba (In the Norwegian people's registry listed as Yabah) has been scheduled for September 15, 2026. Among the questions that Oslo Tingrett may have to decide on, is whether he should be considered a political leader of a liberation movement, or a military or paramilitary leader responsible for war crimes.

== Publication ==
Ayaba Cho Lucas, published the book "Not Guilty" An African Refugee Experience, which is the journey of a black refugee through the complex and restrictive economic centre of fortress Europe as seen through the eyes of one person.
