= Ambazonia Governing Council =

Main separatist movement of Ambazonia

- Coat of arms
- Established: 2013
- Leaders: Julius Nyih (interim president); Ayaba Cho Lucas (2013-24)
- Armed forces: Ambazonia Defence Forces
- Website: agovc.org

The Ambazonia Governing Council (AGovC) is an Ambazonian independence movement. The movement has been known as "hardline" compared to other major Ambazonian separatist movements, and unwilling to engage with federalists. Starting off with a complicated relationship with the larger Interim Government of Ambazonia (IG), following the 2019 Ambazonian leadership crisis, the AGovC officially allied itself to the faction of the IG loyal to the first President of Ambazonia, Sisiku Julius Ayuk Tabe.

== History ==
The AGovC was established in 2013 by the merger of several independence movements, including Southern Cameroons Youth League (SCYL), Southern Cameroons National Council (SCNC), the Southern Cameroons Restoration Movement (SCARM) and the Southern Cameroons Peoples Organization (SCPO). It is led by former SCYL Secretary General Ayaba Cho Lucas.

The AGovC played a key role in initiating the separatist war currently raging between Ambazonian separatist militias and Cameroonian security forces. On September 9, 2017, the AGovC declared the deployment of the Ambazonia Defence Forces in Southern Cameroons and the launching of combat operations to achieve the independence of Ambazonia. Three weeks later, the Southern Cameroons Ambazonia Consortium United Front (predecessor of the Interim Government of Ambazonia, henceforth IG) declared the independence of the country, but did not support the armed struggle that the AGovC had initiated, preferring civil disobedience and a diplomatic campaign. This stance would eventually change.

The AGovC remains outside the IG, with which it has had a complicated relationship. Nevertheless, after initial reluctance, the IG supports the armed wing of the AGovC, the ADF. In March 2019, the AGovC declined to participate in the All Southern Cameroons People's General Conference in Washington, D.C., and did thus not take part in the foundation of the Southern Cameroons Liberation Council. However, it participated in a workshop in Brussels in May 2019, which ended with all Ambazonian independence movements - including the AGovC - promising to set aside ideological differences and form a common front. In June, the AGovC sided with Ayuk Tabe against Samuel Ikome Sako when a leadership crisis broke out within the IG, and in August it formally allied itself with the Ayuk Tabe-led faction. However, when Cameroonian officials met with Ayuk Tabe to discuss a ceasefire in July 2020, the AGovC joined the Sako-led faction of the IG in declaring that prisoners cannot negotiate.

Following the outbreak of an insurgency in Southeastern Nigeria in early 2021, AGovC moved towards a formal alliance with Biafran separatists led by Nnamdi Kanu. The AGovC also declared that it would support Cameroonians who would take up arms to topple Paul Biya. The AGovC-IPOB alliance was denounced by the Interim Government of Ambazonia as well as by other Biafran separatist groups.

On January 21, 2023, the government of Canada announced that the warring parties had signed an agreement to enter a peace process facilitated by Canada. The agreement was signed by the Cameroonian government, the Ambazonia Governing Council (and its armed wing, the ADF), the African People's Liberation Movement (and its armed wing, SOCADEF), the Interim Government of Ambazonia, and the Ambazonia Coalition Team.

On September 24, 2024, AGovC leader Ayaba Cho Lucas was arrested in Norway and charged with inciting crimes against humanity. Following the arrest, AGovC vice president Julius Nyih (based in the Republic of Ireland) was declared interim leader of the organization.
