= Interim Government of Ambazonia =

Provisional government in exile of Ambazonia

- Seal of the Ayuk Tabe and Chris Anu cabinets Seal of the Sako cabinet (2018-2023); Seal of the Marianta cabinet (2022)

- Seal of the Sako cabinet (2023-present)
- Role: Executive cabinet
- Established: 31 October 2017
- President: Disputed (Note: Samuel Ikome Sako, Sisiku Julius Ayuk Tabe, Marianta Njomia, and Chris Anu all claim to be the legitimate President of Ambazonia; see Ambazonian leadership crisis.)
- Armed forces: Ambazonia Self-Defence Council

The Interim Government of Ambazonia, also known by the Sako cabinet as the Government of Southern Cameroons (Note: Sometimes, people add Ambazonia to the end of the name as well.) is an Ambazonian independence movement, and claims to be the provisional government in exile of the internationally unrecognized state. Formed in the early days of the Anglophone Crisis, the movement has since splintered into four factions that claim to be the legitimate Interim Government.

== History ==
=== Ayuk Tabe cabinet (2017–18) ===
The Interim Government of Ambazonia was formed from the Southern Cameroons Ambazonia Consortium United Front (SCACUF), a nonviolent independence movement. Its members include former leaders of the Southern Cameroons National Council (SCNC), an independence movement that was prominent in the 1990s. It was SCACUF, led by Chairperson Sisiku Julius Ayuk Tabe, that declared the independence of Ambazonia on October 1, 2017. The Interim Government was officially formed on 31 October 2017, with Tabe assuming the role as President of Ambazonia and SCACUF forming the Interim Government.

By the time SCACUF transformed into the Interim Government, a separatist war had been raging for almost two months. Several separatist militias were active, with the largest one - the Ambazonia Defence Forces (ADF) - answering to the Ambazonia Governing Council (AGVC), led by Cho Ayaba and with Benedict Kuah as Chief of staff. The Interim Government initially rejected the idea of an armed struggle, preferring civil disobedience and a diplomatic campaign. In early November, the Interim Government condemned an ADF attack on gendarmes.

In January 2018, most members of the Interim Government were arrested by Nigerian authorities and extradited to Cameroon. They were subsequently imprisoned for almost a year, before a trial started in December 2018. This became controversial in Nigeria, as most of those deported had submitted claims for political asylum. In March 2019, a Nigerian court determined that the arrest and deportation had been unconstitutional, and ordered everyone returned to Nigeria and compensated. This had no practical implications, and on August 20, 2019, the ten leaders, including Ayuk Tabe, were sentenced to life imprisonment by the Yaoundé Military Tribunal.

=== Sako cabinet (2018–19) ===
Following the arrest of most of the Interim Government, Samuel Ikome Sako was elected in a diaspora electoral college to acting president in February 2018. In an attempt to unite several local militias under a single banner, the Interim Government created the Ambazonia Self-Defence Council (ASC) in March 2018. While the ASC is collectively larger than the ADF, it does not have a centralized command structure and is more of a cooperation project than a single organization.

President Sako sought to bury the differences between the Interim Government and the Ambazonia Defence Forces, which is loyal to the AGovC. On December 31, 2018, he announced that a Mobile Wing Police would be established, and that the separatists would abandon their defensive strategy and seize the offensive. He also promised to take action against anyone involved in the kidnapping of civilians, which had become a growing problem in Southern Cameroons. On March 31, 2019, the Interim Government and several Ambazonian movements agreed to create the Southern Cameroons Liberation Council, a united front consisting of both separatists and federalists. However, despite its attempts at uniting the separatists, critics accused the Sako cabinet of incompetence and misappropriation of funds.

=== Leadership crisis (2019–present) ===
On May 2, 2019, a document signed by Ayuk Tabe declared that the Sako-led interim cabinet had been dissolved, and that his own pre-arrest cabinet had been restored. The document expressed recognition for the job the Sako-led cabinet had done, but claimed that infighting had rendered it unfit to continue; the caretaker cabinet has lost the ability to reconcile our people and, in doing so, has imperiled the identity and mission of the interim government to complete the decolonization of Southern Cameroons through advancing our collective national interests. This triggered a leadership crisis within the Interim Government, as the Sako-led cabinet refused to step down. In June, the Ambazonia Restoration Council impeached Ayuk Tabe for "treasonous misconduct", and declared that a proper change of leadership would be initiated in three months. This marked the start of the 2019 Ambazonian leadership crisis. The AGovC threw its support behind Ayuk Tabe, and in August it formally allied itself with the Ayuk Tabe-led faction of the IG.

Despite the imprisonment and the infighting within the Interim Government, Ayuk Tabe was still considered more influential than Sako. In July 2020, Cameroonian officials met with Ayuk Tabe and other members of his cabinet to discuss a ceasefire. When asked about his conditions for a ceasefire, Ayuk Tabe listed three; that the ceasefire be announced by President Paul Biya, that the Cameroonian military would pull out of the Anglophone regions, and a general amnesty for separatists.

The outbreak of the Insurgency in Southeastern Nigeria widened the gap between Ambazonian factions. The AGovC declared an alliance with the Indigenous People of Biafra (IPOB), a Biafran separatist movement. The Interim Government under Sako denounced this move, preferring instead to attempt to win the goodwill of the Nigerian government.

On 13 September 2022, long-term IG spokesperson Chris Anu (brother of deceased separatist general Lekeaka Oliver) was voted President of Ambazonia after a six months transition period of Marianta Njomia elapsed.

On 21 January 2023, the government of Canada announced that the warring parties had signed an agreement to enter a peace process facilitated by Canada. The agreement was signed by the Cameroonian government, the Ambazonia Governing Council (and its armed wing, the ADF), the African People's Liberation Movement (and its armed wing, SOCADEF), the Interim Government of Ambazonia, and the Ambazonia Coalition Team.

On 2 December 2023, Sako's Interim Government passed the "Full Restoration Bill", officially changing their name from the Interim Government of Ambazonia to the Government of Southern Cameroons, or the Government of the Federal Republic of Ambazonia, changing the coat of arms and seal of the government, the name of the Interim House of Representatives to the "Southern Cameroons House of Assembly" and restoring the House of Chiefs. They also passed a resolution allowing the government to trademark all property of the government of Ambazonia, and finally passed a resolution allowing the president to "keep master access to all government platforms and websites".

5 days later (on 5 December 2023), Sako signed the 2nd amendment to the constitution, saying on X that he would be signing into law the "revolutionary orders" to the Southern Cameroonian Council as amended, and "restoring the Government of Southern Cameroons in full, representing all people of Ambazonia, and as the sole institution recognised by the UN".

== See also ==
- Communes of Cameroon
- Timeline of the Anglophone Crisis (2023)
- Southern Cameroons
- West Cameroon
