= Sisiku Julius Ayuk Tabe =

Ambazonian separatist leader (born 1965)

1st President of Ambazonia
- Incumbent
- Assumed office 2 May 2019 (disputed)
- Preceded by: Samuel Ikome Sako (disputed)
- In office 1 October 2017 – 4 February 2018 (de facto)
- Preceded by: Position established
- Succeeded by: Samuel Ikome Sako

Personal details
- Born: 2 May 1965 (age 60) Kembong, Manyu Division

Sisiku Julius Ayuk Tabe (born 2 May 1965) is an Ambazonian separatist leader from Ewelle village in Manyu division, and is the disputed first president of the unrecognized Federal Republic of Ambazonia. In January 2018 he was extradited from Nigeria to Cameroon, where he has been incarcerated ever since.

== Life before the Anglophone Crisis ==
Ayuk Tabe was born in 1965 in Kembong, Manyu Division, Southwest Region. For a while, he worked for an electric company named SONEL in the Adamawa Region of Cameroon, and as Academy Manager for Cisco Systems. Eventually he started working for the American University of Nigeria, where he became Assistant Vice President in the field of Digital Services, Marketing and Recruitment. Ayuk Tabe also worked as a motivational speaker at several conferences worldwide. His involvement in charity includes the establishment of the Ayuk Tabe Foundation in the town of Eyumodjock, where he and his wife Lilian lived, and his involvement with the Adamawa Peacemakers Initiative. Ayuk Tabe and his wife owned a farm in Eyumodjock that employed 28 people, but they were forced to shut down in September 2017 after Cameroonian soldiers drove away the workers.

== Presidency ==
His presidency started with Ambazonia's unilateral declaration of independence on 1 October 2017, with Southern Cameroons Ambazonia Consortium United Front (SCACUF) forming the Interim Government of Ambazonia, and Tabe – chairperson of SCACUF – as president by acclamation. By the time of this declaration, a separatist war between Ambazonian militias and Cameroonian security forces had been raging for three weeks. At first, Tabe and the Interim Government rejected the idea of an armed struggle, preferring instead to focus on civil disobedience and a diplomatic campaign to gain international recognition. President Ayuk Tabe's stand was at odds with the declaration of war by President Paul Biya of Cameroon in November 2017 and the deployment of troops in the Anglophone regions.

President Sisiku Ayuk Tabe and other Ambazonian leaders were arrested in Nigeria and extradited to Cameroon in January 2018. Samuel Ikome Sako won a subsequent election to serve as acting interim president a month later.

== Detention, trial and life sentence ==
Following the arrest, Ayuk Tabe and the other separatist leaders spent 10 months at a gendarmerie headquarter, before being transferred to a maximum security prison in Yaoundé. Their case started on 6 December 2018 at the Yaoundé military tribunal. When his name and nationality was read out, he rejected his Cameroonian nationality, and other separatist leaders followed suit. The rejection of Cameroonian nationality led the case to be postponed.

In January 2019, Tabe's lawyer said that his client was ready to negotiate directly with Cameroonian president Paul Biya, on the condition that the negotiations would take place outside Cameroon. Three preconditions were made: A ceasefire, the release of everyone who had been arrested, and a general amnesty. These conditions were repeated in May.

In March 2019, a Nigerian court found his arrest and deportation illegal, and ordered that he and 68 others be returned to Nigeria and compensated. Following this ruling, Tabe and fellow Ambazonian leaders issued a joint statement titled the "Ambazonia Freedom Protocol", in which they made nine commitments, including equality between tribes, equality for women, equal share of the riches of the land, respecting human rights, standing in solidarity with other peoples in a similar situation, and fighting for however long it takes to achieve independence. On 27 April, Tabe and the other nine accused Ambazonian leaders announced that they would start boycotting court sessions, insisting to wait until the Appeal Court of the Centre Region decided on whether or not they should be returned to Nigeria.

On 2 May, a controversial document signed by Ayuk Tabe declared that the Sako-led interim cabinet had been dissolved, and that his own pre-arrest cabinet had been restored. The document expressed appreciation of the job the Sako-led cabinet had done since February 2018, but stressed that infighting had rendered it unfit to continue; the caretaker cabinet has lost the ability to reconcile our people and, in doing so, has imperiled the identity and mission of the interim government to complete the decolonization of Southern Cameroons through advancing our collective national interests. However, the Sako-led cabinet refused to abide by the declaration, resulting in what became known as the Ambazonian leadership crisis. In June, the Ambazonia Restoration Council (a separatist movement dating back to the 1980s) impeached Ayuk Tabe for "treasonous misconduct", and declared that he no longer had a mandate to speak on behalf of the Interim Government. The Ambazonia Governing Council, traditionally a rival of the Interim Government, condemned the impeachment and threw its support behind Ayuk Tabe.

At some point after his arrest, Tabe reached out to former SDF parliamentarian Wirba Joseph, asking him to assume leadership of the revolution. Wirba declined the request.

On 30 July 2019, Ayuk Tabe and the nine other detained members of the Interim Government declared that they would go on a hunger strike over the disappearance of convicts at Kondenguin Central Prison and the Buea Central Prison. The hunger strike would last until their lawyers could verify the whereabouts of each disappeared convict. The strike started at midnight the same day.

On 20 August, Ayuk Tabe and the other nine leaders were sentenced to life imprisonment by the Yaoundé Military Tribunal. Having expected this outcome, the separatists were singing in court while the sentence was pronounced. A week later, a letter signed by Ayuk Tabe stated that the life sentences was not a setback for the separatist cause, but rather a "validation of (their) self-determination and claim to a sovereign and free Southern Cameroons". In September 2020, the Court of Appeals upheld the sentence.

Ayuk Tabe dismissed the Major National Dialogue outright, stating that "[President] Paul Biya does not have the power to determine the fate of Ambazonia". He did, however, welcome the release of Maurice Kamto.

In November 2019, pro-separatist sources reported that Sako and his supporters had changed Sako's title from Acting Interim President to President, aiming to permanently replace Ayuk Tabe even if the latter would ever be released.

In January 2020, newly-arrived prisoners broke into the cells of Ayuk Tabe and the nine other Ambazonian leaders, stealing food and money. Ayuk Tabe and the others accused the prison administration of complicity through inaction, and claimed there was a conspiracy to threaten their lives.

In July 2020, Cameroonian officials met with Ayuk Tabe to discuss a ceasefire. Ayuk Tabe listed three conditions; a general amnesty, that the military pull out of the Anglophone regions, and that President Paul Biya himself announce the ceasefire. Ayuk Tabe also demanded that if prisoners were released in phases, he would be among the last to be released.

On 1 January 2024, Ayuk Tabe wrote a letter calling for an end to the leadership crisis and unity among separatist factions. In January 2025, he declared his continued commitment to the Ambazonian independence movement, and expressed the belief that the insurgency would ultimately succeed.

== Private life ==
Sisiku Julius is married to Lilian Ayuk Tabe, and together they have four children.
