= Samuel Ikome Sako =

Ambazonian politician (born 1966)

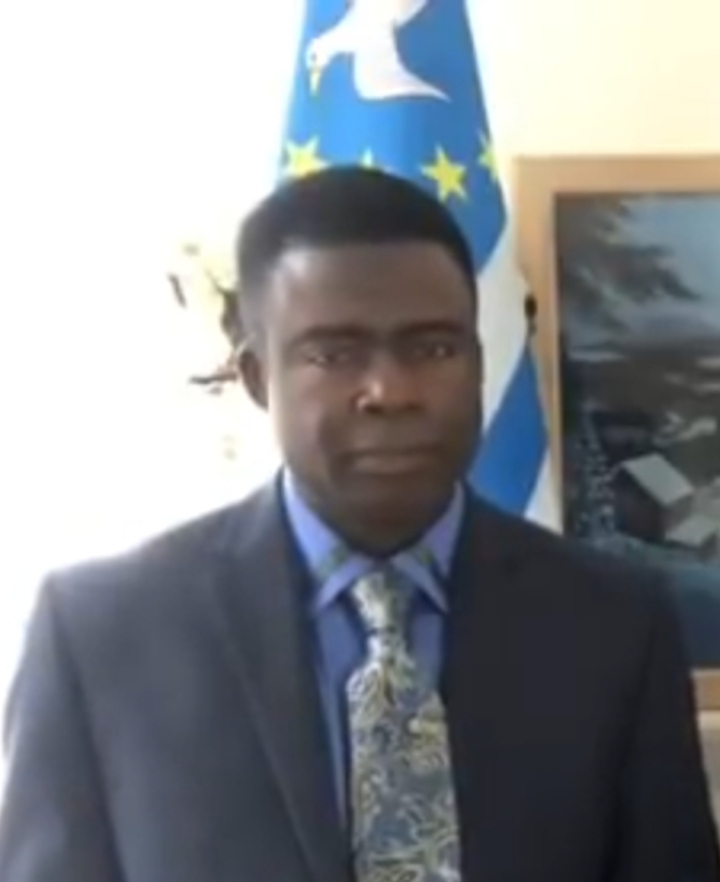
- Sako in 2018

President of Ambazonia
- Incumbent
- Assumed office 4 February 2018 (disputed)
- Preceded by: Sisiku Julius Ayuk Tabe

Personal details
- Born: 28 August 1966 (age 59)

Samuel Ikome Sako is an Ambazonian politician and incumbent president of the internationally unrecognized proto-state of the Federal Republic of Ambazonia. He was elected president of the Interim Government a month after Sisiku Julius Ayuk Tabe, the first president, was abducted in Nigeria and extradited illegally to Cameroon. From captivity in Yaoundé, the former president Ayuk Tabe announced that he had dismissed Sako in May 2019, a decision that started the long-running Ambazonian leadership crisis.

In terms of background, he studied linguistics, and theology and is an ordained minister, Christian counselor and a licensed financial professional. He has spent several years in the United States, where he worked with the Maryland state government, and has been a trade consultant and CEO. He was also president emeritus of the Community Humanitarian Emergency Board International (COHEB).

== Life before Presidency ==
Samuel Ikome Sako has always been in some way connected to politics, being a Securities Trade Consultant in the USA, a Civil Society Activist and Leader from 1998 and a Columnist from 1992 until 2000.

== Presidency ==
After being named interim president, one of Sako's first priorities was to unite the separatist militias on the ground under one banner. In March 2018, the Interim Government created the Ambazonia Self-Defence Council, an umbrella organization intended to include all separatist militias. While the Ambazonia Defence Forces declined to join, many other militias did.

In his end-of-year speech on 31 December 2018, Sako stated that the separatists would change from a defensive to an offensive strategy. He announced that a Mobile Wing Police would be created, with the intention of capturing and holding territory, as well as defeating pro-government militias. He also promised to take action against anyone involved in the kidnappings of civilians, including separatist elements.

In late-March 2019, he attended a conference in Washington, DC, where over a dozen Ambazonian movements (including federalists) were represented. The conference resulted in an agreement to unite under a common front, and the subsequent creation of the Southern Cameroon Liberation Council.

On 2 May 2019, a document signed by Ayuk Tabe declared that the Sako-led interim cabinet had been dissolved and that his own pre-arrest cabinet had been restored. The document expressed recognition for the decent job the Sako-led cabinet had done, but claimed that infighting had rendered it unfit to continue; "the caretaker cabinet has lost the ability to reconcile our people and, in doing so, has imperiled the identity and mission of the interim government to complete the decolonization of Southern Cameroons through advancing our collective national interests." The same declaration stated that Sako would continue as interim president for the time being and that they would look for a new leader in three months. This move was not recognized by the Sako-led cabinet, which refused to step down and accused the captured predecessor of acting the impulses of captors. In June 2019, the Ambazonia Restoration Council impeached Ayuk Tabe for "treasonous misconduct". This development was condemned by Ayaba Cho Lucas of the Ambazonia Governing Council, who supported Ayuk Tabe despite being a rival of the Interim Government.

In June 2019, Sako confirmed that the Interim Government would negotiate with the government of Cameroon with Swiss mediation.

In November 2019, pro-separatist sources reported that Sako and his supporters had changed his title from Acting Interim President to President, aiming to permanently replace Ayuk Tabe even if the latter would ever be released.

In February 2022, Sako ordered the suspension of the Restoration Council, the legislative arm of the Interim Government for unconstitutional usurpation of the executive and judicial malpractice. A contentious committee within the Restoration Council subsequently impeached Dr Sako on contentious allegations, but sought to evade a public trial for lack of sworn evidence, thus potentially widening the long-running leadership crisis but failed to remove him from office. Meeting in Washington DC, 10–13 March 2022, the second Ambazonian Stakeholders Strategic Conference upgraded the Restoration Council into an Interim House of Representatives elected from the 13 counties that make up Ambazonia. Members of the dissolved Restoration Council subsequently declared Marianta Njomia as President.
