= President of Ambazonia =

Head of state

President of the Federal Republic of Ambazonia
- Flag of Ambazonia
- Incumbent; Disputed
- Inaugural holder: Sisiku Julius Ayuk Tabe
- Formation: October 1, 2017

The president of the Interim Government of Ambazonia is the head of state of the unrecognised breakaway state of Ambazonia, which claims the Northwest Region and Southwest Region of Cameroon. No country has formally recognized Ambazonia's independence and the various pro-independence armed groups have not consistently controlled any territory, but are engaged in guerrilla campaigns against pro-government forces. The territory claimed by Ambazonia is currently the site of an armed conflict between Anglophone separatist guerrillas ("Ambazonians") and the Cameroonian military known as the Anglophone Crisis.

For its whole existence, the presidency of Ambazonia has been a position in exile. Since 2019, the presidency has been disputed and none of the claimants has demonstrated effective authority over the various Anglophone or pro-Ambazonian armed groups.

== History ==
On October 1, 2017, Sisiku Julius Ayuk Tabe, the appointed chairman of the Southern Cameroons Ambazonia Consortium United Front (SCACUF), declared the independence of Ambazonia with himself as president and SCACUF forming the Ambazonia Interim Government. His presidency de facto ended on January 5, 2018, when him and other members of the Ambazonia Interim Government were arrested in Abuja, Nigeria, and extradited to Cameroon on January 26. He has been imprisoned by the Cameroonian government ever since.

Following Tabe's arrest, on February 4, 2018, Samuel Ikome Sako was elected acting interim president by an electoral college comprising the remaining Ayuk Tabe cabinet and representatives from the diaspora. On May 2, 2019 and while under detention, a document signed by Ayuk Tabe declared that the Sako-led interim cabinet had been dissolved, and that his own pre-arrest cabinet had been restored. This move was not recognized by the Sako-led cabinet, which refused to step down, arguing that a leader in detention has no mandate to unseat the elected replacement.

In February 2022, Sako ordered the suspension of the Restoration Council, the legislative arm of the Interim Government. The Restoration Council subsequently impeached Sako, thus widening the long-running Ambazonian leadership crisis. Meeting in Washington DC, 10-13 March 2022, the second Ambazonian Stakeholders Strategic Conference upgraded the Restoration Council to an Interim House of Representatives elected from the 13 counties of Ambazonia and reaffirmed support of Sako as President of Ambazonia. Meanwhile, the Restoration Council, declared United Kingdom based Marianta Njomia as Sako's replacement in the interim.

On September 10 2022, long-term IG spokesperson Chris Anu (brother of deceased separatist general Lekeaka Oliver and former Sako loyalist) declared himself President of Ambazonia. Consequently, the separatist movement found itself with four claimants for president.

== List ==
No.	President	Tenure	
No.	President	Took office	Left office
1	Sisiku Julius Ayuk Tabe	1 October 2017	4 February 2018
2	Samuel Ikome Sako	4 February 2018	Incumbent (Note: Undisputed de jure until 2 May 2019, de facto ever since while it remains disputed whether he is still president de jure.)
(1)	Sisiku Julius Ayuk Tabe	2 May 2019	Incumbent (Note: De jure since 2 May 2019 according to his supporters; Sako remains de facto President. Ayuk Tabe received a life sentence at the Yaoundé Military Tribunal on 20 August 2019.)
3	Marianta Njomia	22 February 2022	Incumbent (Note: According to the Restoration Council.)
4	Chris Anu	10 September 2022	Incumbent (Note: According to the Interim Government faction that supports him.)

== See also ==
- Anglophone Crisis
- Premiers of Southern Cameroons
