= Anlu (Cameroon) =

Cameroonian Kom traditional practice

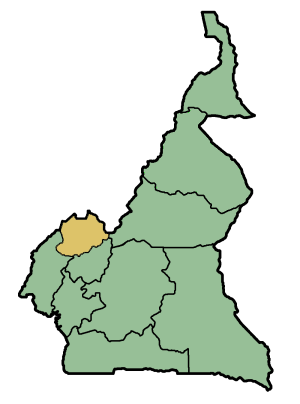
Map of Cameroon with the Northwest Region highlighted.

Anlu is a traditional practice in the Kom communities of the Northwest Region of Cameroon. The practice revolves around groups of women gathering together and engaging in extreme rituals to shame and ostracize individuals who break community morals, such as physical abuse of a pregnant woman or incest. The origin of the practice is said to come from a time the women of Kom communities were the only people left to defend the towns from an invading force and so dressed as men and caused the opposition army to flee. The traditional practice became relevant with large-scale, political mobilizations by women from 1958 until 1961. This political anlu paralyzed both traditional and colonial administration in the Kom region and disrupted courts, schools, markets, and travel through the region.

== Traditional anlu ==
=== Origins ===
Oral traditions claim that anlu was created when, during war, all the males were slaughtered (in some versions this is in Bamessi). The story records that the Kom people were a tributary to a chief in Mejang and their tribute was to build a house in the Mejang city every year. Eventually, the Kom refused and Mejang dispatched an army to put down the rebellion. The Mejang forces decided to attack while the men were hunting and capture all the women. The women heard about this and so dressed in male clothing and went with crude weapons to meet the Mejang. The men fled from what they thought were the troops of Kom and only one was captured. The women stripped off their clothing to reveal that the Mejang forces had been defeated by women and Mejang became a Kom tributary after that point.

=== Practice ===
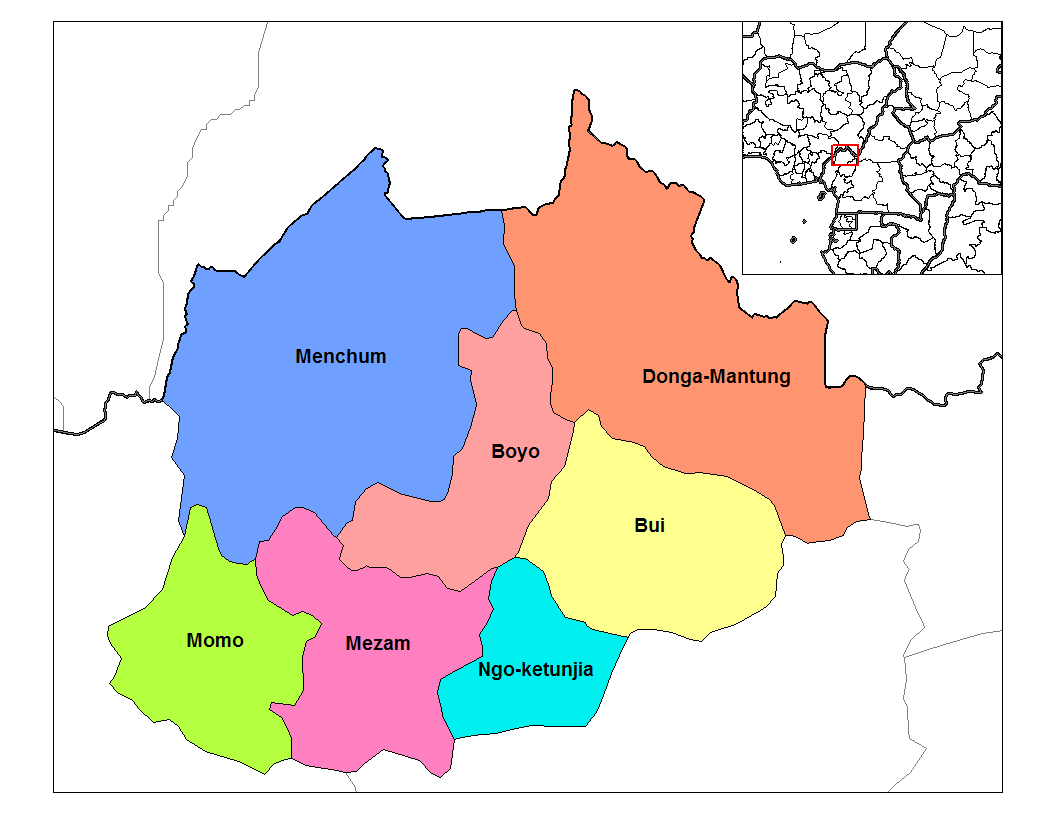
Divisions of Northwest Cameroon. The Kom communities are primarily in the Boyo and Menchum divisions.

Traditional anlu, similar to fombuen or keluh in Kedjom Keku communities and ndofoumbgui in the Aghem tribe, involves groups of women organizing and shaming individuals who violate certain moral rules. The ostracizing could develop as a result of any set of offenses that violated community morality and were believed to threaten the life of the community (by damaging fertility, food, or prosperity). These offenses could include insulting one's mother, physically abusing a pregnant or nursing woman, committing incest, or other offenses. The women would respond with actions considered outside of the communities moral order (vulgar speech, display of genitals, dress in men's clothing, defecation on the offender's property, etc.) in order to highlight the egregiousness of the offense and pressure for repayment. The women themselves are organized under the leadership of the oldest woman of the community, named the na-anlu.

Other men of the community would not intervene or interfere in the anlu, and could become a target of anlu if they did interfere, and husbands of women involved would take over household tasks. Anthropologist Paul Nkwi makes clear that while men typically retain power in traditional Kom communities, during anlu "the men are virtually powerless" and the traditional chiefs and councils are weakened.

The ostracism and punishment of offending individuals would only end when they beg and declare their renunciation of the actions. After this is accepted and a fee is paid, the individual is taken to a stream and immersed in water and the anlu ends.

=== Description ===
Francis Nkwain has provided one of the most popular descriptions of anlu:

Anlu is started off by a woman who doubles up in an awful position and gives out a highpitched shrill, breaking it by beating on the lips with four fingers. Any woman recognising the sound does the same and leaves whatever she is doing and runs in the direction of the first sound. The crowd quickly swells and soon there is a wild dance to the tune of impromptu stanzas informing the people of what offence has been committed, spelling it out in such a manner as to raise emotions and cause action. The history of the offender is brought out in a telling gossip. Appeal is made to the dead ancestors of the offender, to join in with the anlu. Then the team leaves for the bush to return at the appointed time, usually before actual dawn, donned in wines, bits of men's clothing and with painted faces, to carry out the full ritual. All wear and carry the garden-egg type of fruit which is supposed to cause "drying up" in a person who is hit with it. The women pour into the compound of the offender singing and dancing, and, it being early in the morning, there would be enough excreta and urine to turn the compound and houses into a public latrine. No person looks human in that wild crowd, nor do their actions suggest sane thinking. Vulgar parts of the body are exhibited as the chant rises in weird depth.

Many of the descriptive aspects change depending on the offense or the village, but many aspects are retained throughout the region.

== Political anlu (1958–1961) ==
At the end of the colonial period, a large-scale anlu was able to disrupt life in the North-West Province of Cameroon from 1958 until 1961. The anlu was organized around grievances by women over the agricultural policy of British and the Kamerun National Congress (KNC) and were used by the Kamerun National Democratic Party (KNDP) to dislodge the KNC from power. It is sometimes claimed that Augustine Ngom Jua, an important male leader of the KNDP, was a manipulator behind the scene, but accounts vary regarding his influence.

The administration of the colony was promoting a transition from horizontal farming which largely ignored terrain to contour farming which fits with the frame and women, who did most of the agricultural work, resisted the transition. At the same time an unfounded rumor spread that the Kom traditional land would be sold to either the chairman of the KNC or to Igbo people in Nigeria (the KNC at this point had a platform of having the region join with Nigeria). The KNDP organized their efforts in the region emphasizing the women as key in the political situation.

E. M. L. Endeley, the premier of the Southern Cameroon House of Assembly, was scheduled to travel through the Kom region to prepare for elections in 1959. Just prior to his scheduled visit, on 4 July 1958, a meeting was held in the town of Njinikom for a regional council member, Chia K. Bartholomew or C.K. Barth, to explain the contour farming law. Women surrounded the meeting before it adjourned and started the anlu with the traditional shrill cry. Bartholomew escaped from the meeting being chased by the women to the local priest's house. After a couple of hours, he left and returned home where the women gathered again that night. The women dressed in rags, men's clothing, and traditional vines spent the night following the usual anlu practices of shaming Bartholomew and polluting his yard. The movement was led by two women, Fuam (called the Queen) and Muana (called the Divisional Officer), who became the central political actors in the Kom region. The titles, Queen and Divisional Officer, were developed as mockery of the British colonial administration. The women led from the town of Wombong and created a parallel administrative structure during the disruptions from July 1958 until early 1961.

Rumors spread immediately that schools and markets would be disrupted by similar groups of women around the region and on 7 July there were the first in a series of disruptions to schools. The women were able to set up multiple roadblocks and to prevent supporters from attending the 11 July visit by KNC Chairman Endeley. KNC supporters were ostracized and the women forbade anyone from visiting the houses of KNC supporters or suspected supporters. The women began ceremonial mock burials of KNC officials and supporters and it was believed by some that the anlu resulted in the sudden death on 21 December of the KNC Chairman for the Kom region, Joseph Ndong Nkwain.

The women disrupted courts, schools, and markets throughout the Kom region for the rest of the year with protests and disruptive activity. Administrative mechanisms, both traditional and colonial, proved to be entirely powerless and the protests continued. Anthropologist Paul Nkwi explains that "The demonstrations were so wild that no police action could handle it. Only a few police officers were despatched to cover the event, and government had only to dialogue with the women. Even the traditional ruler, Foyn Alo'o Ndiforngu became virtually powerless. The women had taken over control of tribal affairs."

The movement was diverse with a number of different protests being organized by different groups in various villages. In late July 1958, the police were sent to arrest the leaders of the anlu movement, who peacefully surrendered to the authorities. However, women from throughout the region gathered in Bamenda to protest the arrests and the authorities released the leaders and provided transportation for the protesters back home. The leadership largely directed how the women participants should vote in the 1959 and 1961 elections, in which women voted heavily for the KNDP. The movement was crucial in leading the KNDP to victory in the elections in 1959 and 1961.

From 1959 until 1961, anlu was able to get most of their demands met through working with the KNDP which was now in power. It is not clear if the policy regarding contour agriculture was reversed. The anlu movement dissipated in 1959 and ended completely with the 1961 election and the significant victory by the (KNDP). At the beginning of that year, the mobilizations and activism subsided and women returned to their agriculture and households. The leaders retained importance after the anlu with Muana becoming a prominent judge in the customary court. The residents of the region disagree about whether the cleansing ritual from traditional anlu has occurred.

The traditional and political form provide the symbolic basis for the Takembeng protests by women in Cameroon since the 1990s. Those protests cross ethnic lines and join women from throughout the Northwest Province together in actions similar to anlu.

== See also ==
- Aba Women's Riots
