= Afo-A-Kom =

Sculpture and symbol of the Kom people

The Afo-A-Kom is a wooden sculpture, the foremost symbol of the Kom people of the North West Region of Cameroon. In 1966 it was stolen from Kom's royal compound. Seven years later it was recognized in a U.S. art gallery, and after some dispute, it was returned to the Kom people.

The Afo-A-Kom, which means the Kom thing (also Mbang in the Kom language) is a 62.5 in (159 cm) wooden stylized carving of a standing man, crowned and holding a scepter, behind a stool supported on three carved buffalo heads. The core is iroko wood. His face is sheathed in copper and much of the body is covered with reddish and blue beads. (See the Arthemis link below for a photo online.) The Foyn/Fon (chief) cares for the statue, and it symbolizes "royal authority and the promise of continued succession." The carver of this statue is unknown but it is speculated that Afo-A-Kom was carved by the second traditional leader (Foyn) of the Kom people in the 1920s.

In 1966, the Afo-A-Kom was stolen from its sacred grove at Laikom (the seat of the Kom people, where the Foyn resides) by one of the princes, then sold to a middle man who later sold it to an art dealer who took it to the United States of America. The Kom people believe that the Afo-A-Kom possesses mystical powers and that shortly after it arrived in the US it began disturbing its new owners by destroying everything around it. Its new owner took it and threw it into the sea but only to get back home and see the Afo-A-Kom. He took it to a New York art gallery where he sold it for circa 15 million CFA. While there it was recognized, and American art collector Warren M. Robbins raised an alarm. He raised funds together with other Americans and some Kom elite in the US to purchase the stolen statue back from the Manhattan art gallery for under $30,000. Returning the figure, Robbins was welcomed by the Fon of the Kom people Nsom Ngwe, and the President of Cameroon Ahmadou Ahidjo, among other dignitaries.

During the reception of the statue in Yaounde, Ahidjo suggested to Fon Nsom Ngwe that Mbang be kept in the National Museum in Yaounde, but the Fon replied that if the President can provide enough space in Yaounde for him to go and bring the Kom people to stay with it there, then he would accept the president's proposal. Seeing that Kom and the Afo-A-Kom were inseparable, the president made it possible for the statue to be taken back to its habitual residence at Laikom. It was briefly put on display at the Tourism Office in Yaounde and then transported by air to Bamenda. It was then ferried by a delegation of the dignitaries of the region back to Fundong where it was handed back to the Kom people.

It is now in the Laikom palace where it is put on display annually for the Kom people.
