= Timeline of the Anglophone Crisis (2025) =

Conflict, started 2017, in Cameroon

This is a timeline of the Anglophone Crisis in Cameroon during 2025.

The Anglophone Crisis is an ongoing armed conflict in the Republic of Cameroon in Central Africa, where historically English-speaking Ambazonian separatists are seeking the independence of the former British trust territory of Southern Cameroons, which was unified with Cameroon since 1961.

== January ==
- On 3 January, seven Cameroonian soldiers were killed when militants attacked a control post in Akwaya, Manyu. Another soldier was reported injured, and three were missing. According to locals, the militants came from Nigeria's Taraba State, and attacked in two waves, the first of which was repulsed with casualties. The attackers were reported to be Nigerian Fulani militants. Days later, the Ambazonia Governing Council (AGovC) claimed that its armed wing, the Ambazonia Defence Forces (ADF) had carried out the attacks.
- On 7 January, the Bamenda family home of the former AGovC activist Capo Daniel was burned down. Capo Daniel blamed separatist fighters from Bui.
- On 8 January, gunmen shot and killed the president of the Batibo Drivers Union, along the Bamenda-Mbengwi road.
- On 15 January, a businessman was killed by unidentified gunmen in Bamenda.
- On 16 January, a civilian was killed and eight others were injured in a shootout between security forces and suspected separatists in Bamenda.
- On 18 January, three separatist fighters were killed and two were arrested by the Gendarmerie in Bamenda.
- On 27 January, Cameroonian forces arrested several suspected separatists in Bamenda. A suspect was reported to have died in captivity.

== February ==
- On 4 February, suspected separatists killed a road worker in Bamenda. Cameroonian forces raided the vicinity in search for the perpetrators.
- On 9 February, Cameroonian forces launched an operation against a separatist hideout in Bamessing, Ngo-Ketunjia, killing two fighters and arresting three others. Other fighters escaped, including Ngeh Cyprian ("General The Only Bro"), who was the main target of the operation. In Bamenda, a football match in Cameroon's first division was abandoned after suspected separatists opened fire near the stadium. Police said that no one was harmed after the timely intervention of security forces forced the gunmen to flee. Also in Bamenda, two civilians were killed by armed men.
- On 10 February, separatist fighters killed cattle after a failed attack against Youth Day celebrations in Donga-Mantung.
- On 15 February, two separatist fighters were captured and killed by residents in Pinyin.
- On 16 February, Cameroonian forces killed a separatist commander known as "General JC" in his hideout in Bamenda.
- On 17 February, separatist fighters killed a Fulani herdsman they held hostage near Ntumbaw, Donga-Mantung, despite receiving ransom from his family.
- On 19 February, separatist leader Ngeh Cyprian (''General The Only Bro'') led an assault in Bamessing, killing five civilians, including a newborn baby.
- On 21 February, Cameroonian forces safely detonated a suspected separatist IED in Bamenda.
- On 22 February, separatist leader Ngeh Cyprian (''General The Only Bro'') and his group attacked mourners at a funeral in Kedjom Ketinguh. An unspecified number of civilians were kidnapped, and four vehicles were stolen during the attack. The attackers reportedly demanded ransom for the release of the abductees.
- On 23 February, separatist fighters raided Pinyin village and killed six civilians.

== March ==
- On 1 March, authorities in Bali announced that nine separatist fighters, including a commander, had turned themselves in.
- On 14 March, a retired prison warden was burned alive in Muyuka by a separatist fighter known as "One Man Squad." On the same day, the killing of a police officer in a separatist ambush by General Talk and Do's Ambazonia State Army was announced in Mbiame.
- On 17 March, two taxi drivers were killed by suspected separatist fighters in Bomaka, Buea. In Baba I, Ngo-Ketunjia, Cameroonian forces rescued six hostages from a separatist hideout and killed three separatist fighters.
- On 19 March, at least two Cameroonian soldiers were killed in a suspected separatist ambush in Magba, West Region.
- On 22 March, a Cameroonian soldier was killed and three others were abducted in a separatist attack near Mbingo, Boyo.
- On 23 March, Cameroonian forces ambushed and killed a suspected separatist fighter in Bamenda.
- On 26 March, it was reported that separatist fighters began confiscating ID cards from civilians in Bui.

== April ==
- On 1 April, a British missionary and his assistant were abducted by suspected separatist fighters in Bambui, before being released two days later.
- On 9 April, one officer was killed and another was injured in Bamenda. The ADF claimed responsibility for the attack. In Ekona, four separatist fighters were killed in a military ambush.
- On 12 April, at least four separatist fighters died in a failed attack on a military base.
- On 18 April, two suspected separatist fighters were killed and three hostages were released during a military operation in Ndu. Other separatist fighters were allegedly arrested.
- On 27 April, it was reported that Cameroonian forces killed a man in Bafut. In Bambili, a businessman and teacher was assassinated by suspected separatists.
- On 30 April, vigilantes and separatist fighters clashed in Pinyin.

== May ==
- On 1 May, separatist fighters killed the newly appointed manager of Moghamo Express in Bambui.
- On 2 May, separatist fighters killed two civilians and injured three others in Bambili.
- On 4 May, two Mbororo herders were kidnapped and killed by suspected separatist fighters in Mbawfi, Donga-Mantung. In Bambui, a journalist was kidnapped before escaping the next day. In Bamenda, separatist fighters killed a bike rider.
- On 5 May, two Cameroonian soldiers were killed and three others were injured in an IED attack in Munyenge, near Ikata.
- On 10 May, suspected separatist fighters killed a civilian in Bamenda for consuming a Brasseries du Cameroun product.
- On 11 May, it was reported that Cameroonian forces summarily executed two suspected separatist fighters in Nkwen.
- On 14 May, Cameroonian forces reportedly launched an operation in Pinyin, killing five people.
- On 15 May, Cameroonian forces launched a sweeping operation in Bambili, arresting at least hundred students.
- On 20 May, Cameroonian soldiers survived an IED attack in Tobin, Kumbo, after responding to an incident where separatist fighters raised their flag at a gendarmerie brigade. A group calling itself the "Bui Warriors" claimed responsibility.

== June ==
- On 1 June, three people were killed in two separate shootings in Bamenda. Nine students were reportedly molested by separatist fighters while travelling from Esu to Wum.
- On 15 June, suspected separatist fighters killed a man near a church in Bamenda.
- On 16 June, three people were injured in a separatist attack in Nkwen, Bamenda.
- On 18 June, separatists attacked a military post in Maloun le Petit, between the West Region and Mbonso, Bui, Northwest Region, killing three soldiers and injuring two others. The Bui Unity Warriors and the Donga Mantung Unity Warriors claimed responsibility for the attack.
- On 25 June, Cameroonian forces raided a separatist hideout in Benahundu, near Benakuma, Menchum, killing a commander known as "Vandam" and seizing weapons and ammunition.
- On 30 June, one person was killed and two people were injured after heavy shooting in Mile 16, Buea. Reports also say four taxis and a motocycle were set ablaze during the shooting.

== July ==
- On 7 July, suspected separatist fighters attacked the Dreamland Cabaret in Bamenda, injuring multiple civilians. At least four separatist fighters were killed in a Cameroonian ambush in Below Foncha, Bamenda.
- On 8 July, a gendarme was confirmed killed after he was abducted two weeks prior in Ndop. Separatist commander "General A Nova Die" claimed responsibility. Cameroonian forces raided Bamessing, killing two suspected separatists. In Muea, separatist fighters publicly executed a civilian whom they accused of being a "blackleg."
- As of 11 July, Cameroonian soldiers trekked along known separatist routes between Muyuka and Munyenge, deploying equipment to detect and neutralise IEDs.
- On 13 July, a soldier was killed and many others injured in a suspected separatist IED attack near Mile 12 Bafia, Muyuka Subdivision. Following the attack, dozens of civilians were arrested by the military.

== August ==
- On 2 August, at least four separatist fighters were killed in Maumu, Fako, including two commanders.
- On 6 August, a Cameroonian-American educator and businessman was killed by suspected separatist fighters in Bamenda.
- Over the weekend of 18 August, a passenger in a vehicle was shot dead by unidentified gunmen in Bamenda.
- On 19 August, a pregnant woman and the driver of the taxi she was traveling in were shot dead by law enforcement officers on the outskirts of Bamenda.
- On 23 August, separatist fighters attacked a convoy in Tiko, killing a soldier and a civilian.
- On 26 August, suspected separatist fighters abducted nine civilians in Tabenken.

== September ==
- On 5 September, seven Cameroonian soldiers were killed in a separatist IED attack in Malende, Muyuka Subdivision. The Unity Warriors of Fako claimed responsibility for the attack. ADF commanders Benedict Nwana Kuah and Pascal Kikishy Wongbi were arrested in Minnesota, United States, and charged with conspiracy to kill, kidnap, maim and injure persons in Cameroon, and conspiracy to launder money. Benedict Nwana Kuah faces additional charges of conspiring to use weapons of mass destruction in Cameroon.
- On 6 September, a gendarme was killed at a checkpoint in Wotutu, near Limbe. Separatist fighters claimed responsibility for the attack.
- On 14 September, an IED detonated in a bar near a police station in Batibo, killing one civilian and injuring four others.
- On 20 September, suspected separatist fighters stormed a neighborhood in Ekona, killing four civilians whom they accused of being "black legs". The assailants also burned down a house.
- On 21 September, a soldier was killed and two others were injured in a separatist IED attack in Kumbo.
- On 27 September, some Bamenda-based Ambazonian separatist militias reportedly declared a pause of regional ghost towns between 11–13 October, to enable people to vote in the 2025 Cameroonian presidential election. The document, which could not be independently verified, would (if authentic) signal a shift after successive election boycotts by the separatists, dating back to the start of the war. Diaspora activists were split on he matter, with Ayaba Cho Lucas and the AGovC declaring that there would be a strict, one-week lockdown between 6–12 October.

== October ==
- On 12 October, the day of the presidential election, most towns in the Anglophone regions such as Bamenda remained virtually deserted. In Fundong, gunshots were heard. The mayor of the town attributed these shots to separatists. Similar incidents were reported in Kumbo, without any casualties.
- On 21 October, a CPDM member of Parliament was kidnapped in Donga-Mantung, amid post-election tensions.
- On 28 October, the regional delegate of the Ministry of Livestock, Fisheries, and Animal Industries (MINEPIA) was shot dead by gunmen in Bamenda.

== November ==
- On 5 November, four gendarmes were killed in a separatist ambush in Tubah.
- On 13 November, suspected separatists attacked a mosque in Sabga, Tubah, Mezam, killing four worshippers. The attackers also kidnapped several other people before retreating into a forest area. Alerted of the situation, the national gendarmerie is deployed, conducting a search operation and freeing the hostages.
- On 30 November, two soldiers were killed in an IED attack in Bamenda.

== December ==
- On 2 December, a journalist was kidnapped in Bamenda.
- On 3 December, suspected separatist fighters abducted three people and briefly clashed with security forces in Bamenda.
- On 5 December, at least two Cameroonian soldiers were killed and several others injured in a separatist attack in Fundong. In Bafut, Cameroonian forces killed nine people including five separatist fighters and four civilians.
- On 17 December, separatist fighters ambushed government forces at a checkpoint in Binshua, killing one soldier. In Bangshie, two soldiers were killed in an IED attack.
- On 20 December, separatist fighters abducted several students and other residents in Bambili for ransom.
- On 28 December, suspected separatists carried out an ambush using an IED in Mile 6 Nkwen, Bamenda.
- On 29 December, Cameroonian security forces launched an operation to retake Mbveh from the forces of "General Talk and Do". The operation led to heavy fighting which lasted for several days.
