= Takembeng =

Cameroonian women's social movement

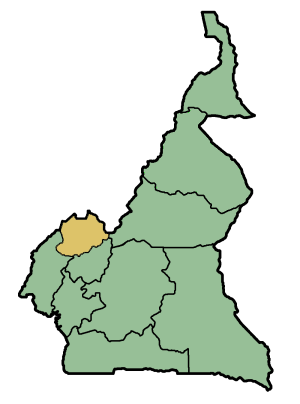
Map of Cameroon with the Northwest Region highlighted.

Takembeng or Takumbeng are a female social movement in the Northwest Region of Cameroon. These movements connect with traditional practices common throughout the Western grassfields of Cameroon where groups of women perform ostracizing rituals against individuals in their communities. Toward the end of colonial control and in the early years of independent Cameroon (the 1950s and 1960s), these local practices became a crucial tool for larger political protest, often against agricultural policy. With political liberalization in the 1990s, the Takembeng women became a crucial part of opposition to the ruling Cameroon People's Democratic Movement (CPDM) party. The women marched with the Social Democratic Front (SDF) and would use nudity and the social status of older women to prevent troops and security forces from harassing protesters.

The Takembeng practices often involve groups of thirty to a couple of hundred women participating in wider protests in Bamenda (the Northwest Region capital), but separated from other protesters by large spaces. Nudity, public defecation and urination are used, in connection with the precolonial practices, to emphasize the shame of anti-democratic practices and to prevent disruption by police or security forces. These practices have been very effective in providing room for protests and continue to be used in the Northwest Region.

== Name origin ==
Takembeng is referred to in a variety of different ways, including: Takumbeng, Amazons, les Amazones des SDF, and Mami Takembeng. However, Takembeng is the most common spelling and rendering in the English language newspapers of Cameroon. The name is claimed to derive from a society of princes in the precolonial Bafut tribal area.

== Roots ==
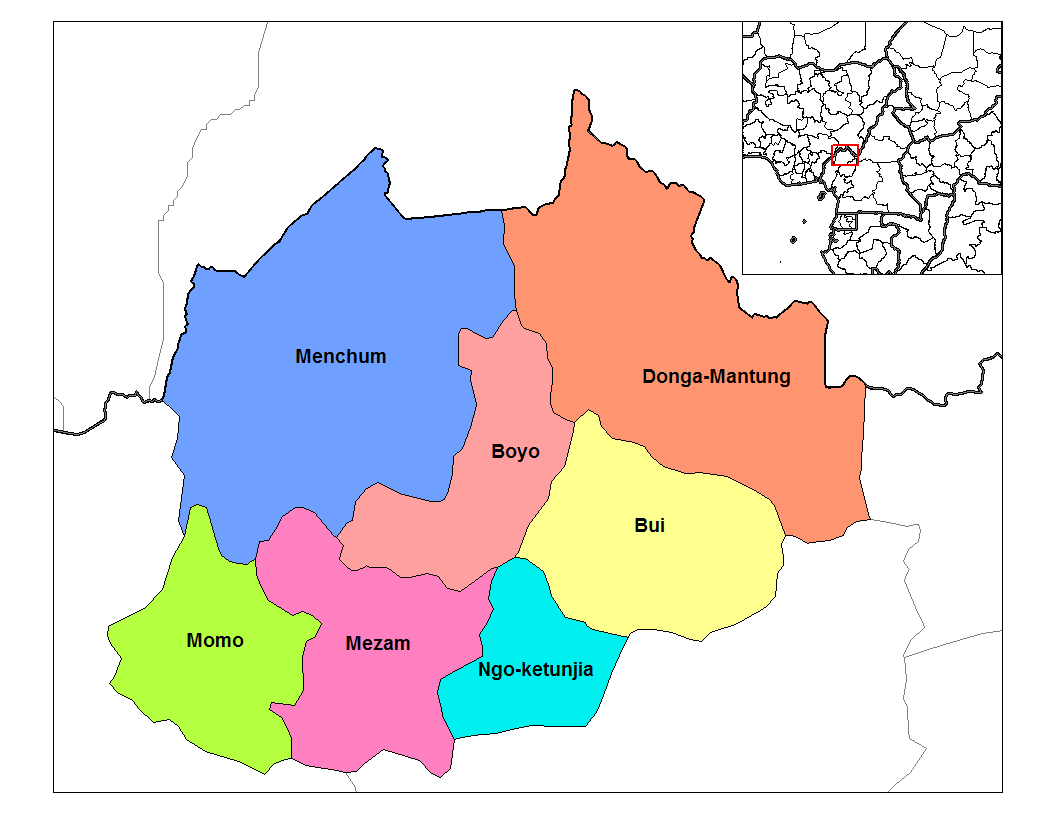
Divisions of Northwest Cameroon.

Takembeng mobilizations are the latest in a long history of female mobilizations in the Western grassfields of Cameroon. Sociologist Susan Diduk divides these mobilizations into three different periods (with prior forms continuing to exist in later periods). The first period of women exercising moral guardianship involved women in rural communities mobilizing to shame individuals who violated key community moral standards. A second period involved women from multiple communities connecting with one another to protest colonial and post-independence policies, primarily agricultural, from the 1950s on. Takembeng is the name for mobilizations which begun in the early 1990s and often took place with the opposition party to the government, the Social Democratic Front (SDF). Some sources claim that Takembeng is a long-standing practice in Ngemba communities and that it does not grow from the practices in the various communities.

=== Moral guardianship ===
Throughout many communities in the grassfields of Cameroon (much of the present-day Northewest Region), there are longstanding practices of women gathering together as moral guardians of the community and in shaming individuals who break key rules. In addition women provide key ceremonial functions in many of the rural communities throughout the region: namely in protecting agricultural fertility. The moral guardianship gatherings would often use outlandish behavior in the ostracizing of individuals in order to highlight the severity of the offense and to prevent other people from intervening in the punishment. The practices differed in the various communities and are called fombuen or keluh in Kedjom Keku communities, anlu in Kom communities, and ndofoumbgui in the Aghem tribe.

In general these gatherings would involve older women, usually post-menopausal, gathering together in order to punish individuals of the community for offense such as being accused of witchcraft, falsely accusing others of witchcraft, physically abusing family members or pregnant women, incest, or committing other offenses. In the precolonial situation, these practices were very local, never extended outside of a single ethnic community, and established clear remedies for the individuals targeted (typically begging for forgiveness from the women, paying a fine, and being ritually cleansed). The older women gather at the house of the individual being targeted, sing and chant, and behave in ways which are typically against decorum (including stripping, defecating and urinating on the person’s property, sexual harassment and puns directed at passersby, dressing in male attire, etc.) in order to express the severity of the offense. In Kedjom Keku communities, the women would be led by comedians (called vugweys) who would lead the group in making vulgar jokes and puns at those passing by and the individual being shamed. In Kom communities, the women would be led by the oldest women in the community, called na-anlu (mother of anlu) for the duration of the shaming, who was in charge of organizing the various efforts.

Dress was an important feature in these events and the women dressed often in old clothing or rags with hats (increasingly backwards baseball caps in Kedjom Keku) and would be adorned with plants which are claimed to provide protection to the women.

Men largely avoid the demonstrations and run away from the protests to avoid the women acting in offensive ways. There are rumors that seeing the women can drain a person’s vital force and this keeps men from intervening in the practice at all. These local, rural practices are considered crucial aspect of upholding the morality of the communities and provide women with a unique aspect of power in the affairs of the community.

=== Development as political protest ===
During colonial rule, these local gatherings were transformed into a more political practice which would be targeted against political institutions. They would include multiple communities, although still remaining closely related to specific ethnic groups, and would be aligned with political parties. During this period, key issues for mobilization included threats to female land tenure, rumors of the sale of land to different ethnic groups, crop destruction caused by grazing animals which had increased in the grasslands, and disputes over the required use of new agricultural techniques (namely, contour cultivation).

The traditional tools of shaming and ostracizing individuals grew to target and be organized against colonial authorities and specific political parties using protests, disruptions in public spaces, roadblocks, and other nonviolent means. The most significant example is the 1958-1961 political anlu in the Kom communities. The event started on 4 July 1958 in the town of Njinikom when women who were upset about agricultural policy decisions surrounded the location of a meeting and forced the local council member C.K. Batholomew to flee to the local church for protection. The disturbance spread and led to large shutdowns of schools, undermined both traditional and colonial authorities, set up roadblocks around the region, and disrupted most aspects of life. Government in the area was largely replaced by the women who organized a separate leadership structure and were able to influence the situation around the region. The protest proved crucial in undermining the Kamerun National Congress (KNC), which had been in power in the region, and leading to the victory of the Kamerun National Democratic Party (KNDP).

Similar protests continued in independent Cameroon with women organizing as a form of limited political protest, often against agricultural policy.

== Takembeng mobilizations ==
=== Background ===
Takembeng protests developed in the early 1990s, located primarily in the city of Bamenda. With political liberalization, including the first multi-party elections in 1992 and the legalization of opposition parties (including the important Social Democratic Front in the Northwest Province), Takembeng protests began to play a part of the wider political struggle. The movement became highly important following the 1992 elections and the disorder that followed in the Northwest Province, where much of the population believed the results were fraudulent and protests became widespread.

=== Practice ===
Since the early 1990s, most typically in the city of Bamenda, marches by groups of older women have been referred to as Takembeng. These protests involve groups of 30 to a couple hundred older women marching or protesting through the city, often taking part with other political protests affiliated with the main opposition party in Cameroon, the SDF. While the other protesters are quite loud and active at these protests, the Takembeng women remain largely silent while marching (which distinguishes the current manifestations from the earlier versions). Similarly, unlike the earlier practices, these recent movements include women from a variety of different ethnic groups. Although rural women provide a core part of the movement, it also includes urban women who live in Bamenda.

However, some symbols and practices associated with the earlier forms of local action are continued in Takembeng. The women primarily wear old clothes (although some wear deliberately clashing bright colors) and many dress with plants which are believed to provide protective powers, prominently the nkung plant. Men and uninvolved women deliberately avoid the Takembeng women and there are rumors that men become ill or die if they observe the Takembeng women naked. Rumors are widely circulated that soldiers and government forces which do not adhere to these conventions either die or lose their wives. As a result, soldiers and security forces change tactics when engaging with Takembeng women.

Most, but not all, of the participants are post-menopausal women and the older women are the leaders of the most challenging behaviors. Post-menopausal women are of key importance because they are believed not to be vulnerable to witchcraft which may take away their fertility, because they have esteem in their communities, and because they have more time for activities.

In terms of tactics, the Takembeng women use their numbers and the social status accorded to older women in order to protect other protesters. In certain instances, the women use nudity and urinating and defecating in public as key aspects of their protest. Showing their vaginas or threatening to do so provide a unique power for the women and these tactics are quite effective in preventing troops or security forces from intervening in the protests. Historian Henry Kam Kah explains that "The symbolisation in this threat of the vagina shows the central role of women in matters of procreation. Reverence for the vagina is reverence for the woman and her creator. A woman can lose all else but not her vagina which is representative of her entire womanhood. Women do not expose them carelessly and when this happens or threats are made to this effect, men take to their heels for they cannot abuse the part of the body that brought them to mother earth. In fact, in contemporary Cameroon, the Takembeng women of Mankon, Bamenda, used the vagina as a weapon to lend support to the Social Democratic Front (SDF) party and dispel the gun trotting [sic] military men." Similarly, Susan Diduk explains that “it is less that female nakedness affronts onlookers, and more that displaying female genitalia is a powerful act of moral censure embodying widely shared assumptions about mystical power and pollution.” These more direct forms of activism are not undertaken without great care being taken. Younger women are not included in these practices and are kept a good distance away from these demonstrations and soldiers and security forces are warned before they occur.

The Takembeng women provide a unique political organization in the restrictive political environment of Cameroon. In order to avoid being stopped by security forces as they walk from rural areas to urban centers they wear better clothing on the trip. However, when they march, the state responds with less violent measures than they do with other protesters (although at times, Takembeng women are also placed under house arrest, beaten, and killed by the government). As a result of this greater tolerance, Takembeng women provide some key support to the opposition party, the Social Democratic Front (SDF). In 1998, Takembeng women provided a protective caravan for John Fru Ndi, SDF Chairman, to leave the country and make a political trip to France and the United States. Although they are related closely with the SDF, the members of the Takembeng are clear in interviews that they are not a branch or tool of the party; instead, they support the ideals of the party and as long as the SDF holds to those values, their protests will overlap. During the disorder of the early 1990s, Takembeng women were recorded disrupting troops from elsewhere in Cameroon by stripping in front of them.

Takembeng women do not limit their involvement to protest with many taking place in traditional moral guardianship in their home communities and also increasingly taking an active role in promoting community development activities.

== Partial list of major Takembeng mobilizations ==
- After 26 May 1990- After six citizens were killed in a pro-democracy protest, Takembeng women began organizing.
- 5 July 1991- Takembeng women openly challenge security forces of Cameroon in a march to the provincial governor's house. Troops and security forces become largely powerless against the women when they strip and the march is completed.
- After the 1992 Presidential Elections- Opposition leader John Fru Ndi was placed under house arrest. Takembeng women surrounded his compound to prevent his formal arrest and provided him with food and access to supporters.
- 1998- Takembeng women provided a protected trip for Fru Ndi from Bamenda to Douala for a diplomatic trip outside Cameroon.

== See also ==
- Aba Women's Riots
