= Timeline of the Anglophone Crisis (2026) =

Conflict, started 2017, in Cameroon

This is a timeline of the Anglophone Crisis in Cameroon during 2026.

The Anglophone Crisis is an ongoing armed conflict in the Republic of Cameroon in Central Africa, where historically English-speaking Ambazonian separatists are seeking the independence of the former British trust territory of Southern Cameroons, which was unified with Cameroon since 1961.

== January ==
- On 4 January, two gendarmes were killed in a separatist attack in Bafmeng, Menchum.
- On 6 January, at least 11 separatist fighters were killed in a military ambush in Ntabah. A soldier was injured in the operation. In Eyumojock, separatists briefly abducted the mayor.
- On 14 January, 15 civilians were killed and 14 others were injured in a suspected separatist attack in Mbandfung, Ndu.

== February ==
- On 8 February, four people were killed when armed men raided Ntumbaw, Ndu.
- On 9 February, a civilian was killed during armed clashes in Bamenda.
- On 11 February, separatists imposed a three-day lockdown to disrupt Youth Day celebrations.

== March ==
- On 6 March, two Cameroonian soldiers were killed in a separatist ambush in Belo.
- On 9 March, a community leader from Bambui was found dead. He had been abducted by separatist fighters days prior. Previously, he had been abducted by the same group and released for ransom.
- On 14 March, two separatist fighters, including a commander known as "General Jakaban", were killed in a Cameroonian raid on their hideout in Bafut. A civilian was also killed.
- On 19 March, the Supreme Court of Cameroon annulled the life sentences of ten separatist leaders (the "Nera 10") from the Interim Government of Ambazonia, including Sisiku Julius Ayuk Tabe, and ordered a retrial.
- On 28 March, two Cameroonian soldiers were killed and an unknown number of others were abducted in a separatist attack in Ikata, Muyuka.

== April ==
- On 13 April, three days before Pope Leo XIV’s visit to Bamenda, a separatist alliance declared a three-day ceasefire, from 15 to 17 April.
- On 19 April, two soldiers were killed in separatist attacks in Ndop and Bambui.
- On 22 April, it was reported that fresh clashes had left several soldiers and civilians dead, as separatists carried out renewed attacks following the three-day ceasefire.
- On 25 April, separatist fighters took two construction workers hostage in Mile 5, Bamenda. On the same day, "Commandant Marcel", a Bui Unity Warriors commander, was captured by security forces at a hospital; he had previously been wounded in a clash with pro-government forces near Mbveh.
- On 26 April, Cameroonian forces carried out a raid in Ndzerem-Nyam, Jakiri, killing at least 14 separatist fighters and 6 civilians. Some civilians were injured and 38 motorcycles were burned.

== May ==
- On 1 May, two soldiers were killed in Kedjom Keku.
- On 2 May, two separatists were killed in Santa.
- On 3 May, separatist fighters burned heavy construction equipment in Mile 5, Nkwen, Bamenda over a failed ransom demand.
- On 9-10 May, separatists killed one civilian and abducted 13 in Bangourain, West Region.
- On 17 May, at least two soldiers were killed in a separatist attack on a military post in Muyuka.
- On 18-20 May, separatists declared a three-day lockdown to boycott the National Day.
- On 23 May, at least 40 civilians were abducted by separatist fighters in Bamti, Bui. The fighters reportedly accused the civilians of refusing forced labor.

== June ==
- On 2 June, about 12 people, including 10 bus passengers, were abducted by suspected separatist fighters in Sabga.
- On 5 June, a soldier was killed by separatists in Kumbo.
- On 6 June, eight separatists were killed in Sop.
- On 8 June, suspected separatist fighters shot and killed two students in Bambui.
- On 9 June, suspected separatists killed two soldiers and two civilians in a bar in Noni, Bui.
- On 11 June, two Cameroonian soldiers were killed in a separatist ambush in Belo.

== July ==
- On 3 July, Henry Njimbogwe ("General No Mercy") was killed by Cameroonian forces in Bambalang. Njimbogwe was the leader of the Bambalang Marine Forces and the Bui Unity Warriors, having succeeded General No Pity as the leader of both groups.
- On 9 July, separatist fighters killed Second Lieutenant Wamba Momo, son of Deputy Justice Minister Jean de Dieu Momo, in Bui.
- On 17 July, Cameroonian soldiers killed three separatists fighters at a separatist checkpoint in Bui.
- On 19 July, it was reported that the Rapid Intervention Brigade (BIR) had killed "Major General Sagat," the leader of a separatist militia known as the Fako Mountain Lions. In Bali, separatist fighters killed a civilian business owner and injured two others in a targeted killing; the separatists had previously extorted the business owner for money.
- On 20 July, the BIR raided a separatist hideout in Bai Road, Southwest Region, killing two separatist fighters who were led by a commander known as "General Lion".
- On 26 July, armed men stormed a football field during a match, summarily executed a match official, and abducted three others in Eyumodjock.

== August ==
- On 2 August, Cameroonian forces killed three civilians in Widikum, reportedly after mistaking them for separatists.
- On 5 August, separatists carried out a failed attack at a gendarmerie station in Nkor Noni to free detained separatists, who were subsequently killed.
- On 8 August, separatists ambushed a convoy on the Buea-Muyuka road.
- On 10 August, violent clashes initiated by insurgents erupted in Buea, killing a taxi driver and wounding several others.
- On 11 August, armed men stopped a bus at the Batibo-Mamfe road and kidnapped 20 people for ransom.
- On 15 August, clashes near Buea left two Cameroonian soldiers dead.

== September ==
- On 7 September, separatists began enforcing a week-long lockdown to disrupt the new school year, with armed clashes being reported in several towns.
- On 8 September, attackers killed a police officer and abducted five teachers in Wum.
- On 13 September, seven people were abducted by suspected separatist fighters in Bangourain.
- On 12-19 September, six civilians were killed in Ekona.
- On 14 September, armed men attacked guests at a bar in Bamenda, killing three and injuring two.
- On September 23, separatist fighters crossed into Littoral Region and killed three soldiers in Matouke.
- On 24-25 September, separatists launched attacks on Cameroonian forces and civilians in Buea and Bamenda.

== October ==
- On 1 October, separatists declared "ghost towns" to mark the 2017 Ambazonian declaration of independence, resulting in empty streets in Buea and Bamenda as well as a sizeable Cameroonian security deployment in the region.
- On 9 October, gunmen opened fire on the vehicle of the First Deputy Mayor of Bamenda.
- On 28 October, a group of suspected separatists opened fire in Koshin village, Menchum, killing four civilians. Cameroonian forces intercepted and killed four of the gunmen as they retreated.
