= Oshie (disambiguation) =

T. J. Oshie is an American former professional ice hockey player.

Oshie may also refer to:

- Mamoud Oshie (born 1998), Ghanaian footballer
- Oshie Bichar, musician that performed with the band Beartooth
- Oshie, Cameroon, a village in Cameroon
- Oshie Ridge, a ridge of the Sankwala Mountains
- Oshie language, an alternate name for the Ngoshie language of Cameroon
