= Warren Robbins =

Warren Robbins may refer to:

- Warren Delano Robbins (1885–1935), American diplomat
- Warren M. Robbins (1923–2008), American Foreign Service officer and founder of the National Museum of African Art

== See also ==
- Warner Robins, Georgia, a city in the United States
