= Bambui =

Bambui is an emerging township in northwestern Cameroon. With a population of about 35,000 people, it is located at an elevation of about 1350 metres above sea level. Administratively, Bambui is the headquarters of Tubah Sub-Division in the North West Region of Cameroon. Popularly known to its inhabitants as “abeh-mbeuh,” Bambui is one of the Bamenda grassfield communities of Cameroon, and is known for its mix of modern and indigenous African life. With its lush, rolling, and fertile plains, a mild tropical climate, and an extremely industrious farming community, Bambui is the bread basket of the North West Region in particular and of Cameroon in general. Lying snug in the immense arms of the Sabga hill, Bambui is situated between Sabga and the undulating foothills that separate it with its neighbors, virtually in the shape of a bowl. Bambui is located at the cross-roads that lead to some of the North West Region's major towns of Bamenda, Ndop, Kumbo, Fundong and Nkambé.

With its strategic location, excellent road infrastructure, and a galaxy of educational and religious institutions such as the government owned Institute of Agricultural Research and Development (IRAD), the School of Agriculture of the University of Dschang, a National Polytechnic and catholic institutions such as the Saint Thomas Aquinas Major Seminary (STAM), a Nunnery called Capuchin Friars, two communities or Convents of Reverend Sisters, as well as the hospitality of the people, Bambui is metamorphosing into a metropolis, but without compromising its culture and cultural identity.

Culturally and administratively, Bambui has been a fondom in its own right for nearly 400 years. Ruled by a Paramount Chief and made up of the sub-chiefdoms of Manju, Mallam, Matulaah, Fingeh, and Alaakubeh, the people of Bambui trace their ancestry to the Tikar tribe, which originated from the Adamawa, North and Far North Regions of present-day Cameroon. Like most Bamenda grassfield fondoms, the people of Bambui migrated to their present location in waves, and led by princes or family heads who had the desire of setting up their own dynasties. The first arrivals were the people of Manju, Matulaah and Mallam who as descendants of the same family were led by their own family heads or princes. The people of Alaakubeh and Fingeh sub-chiefdoms on the other hand, migrated to Bambui much later in the 20th century from Santa sub-Division and Kom in Boyo Division following chieftaincy and/or land disputes between them and their ancestral homes. In fact, the people of Alaakubeh and Fingeh were offered residence in Bambui by the late Fon Amungwafor II who ruled the fondom from 1947 to 1995.
