= Fonfuka =

- Commune and town
- Location in Cameroon
- Coordinates: 6°31′N 10°26′E
- Country: Cameroon
- Region: Northwest
- Department: Boyo
- Time zone: UTC+1 (WAT)

Fonfuka is located in Boyo with coordinates 6⁰31'N 10⁰26'E, this town is the headquarters of the Bum sub-division in Boyo Division in the Northwest of Cameroon. It is found in the grassfields of the Savana state which constitutes high lands and lowlands

Fonfuka is rich agriculturally with fertile soils, which is favorable in the cultivation of cash crops and palms. Most inhabitants of this area are farmers with a minority being businessmen and women.

The river Kimbi is one of their sources of water in the Fonfuka community which gives the agricultural advantage along its banks.

Religiously, it is the seat of the first Baptist church in the North West Region since 1927 Songka Fonfuka in Bum. It is a religious town with multiple denominations with the likes of the Roman catholic, Full Gospel, Presbyterian etc.

It's educational ladder ranges from kindergarten to college but the educational sector is still very limited due to the lack of good roads, internet and electricity.

== See also ==
- Communes of Cameroon
