= Francis Nkwain =

Cameroonian politician and educator

Francis Isidore Wainchom Nkwain (19 April 1931 — 19 October 2014) was a Cameroon politician and educator. He served as a senator and as a member of the Central Committee of the Cameroon People's Democratic Movement. A native of Boyo in north-west Cameroon, he was initially a Catholic mission teacher, having been educated at the St. Anthony Primary School, but in 1960, after 15 years of practicing that profession, he changed his career trajectory to public political service by attending the University of Ghana to study Sociology and Administration. He traveled internationally in diplomatic service from 1964 to 1987, when he was appointed Minister Delegate in charge of Relations with National Assembly. In 1997, he left political service for a time and thereafter served as the chairman of the board of the University of Dschang. In 2013, he was appointed to the senate. He died on 19 October 2014 of an undisclosed illness, leaving his wife, six daughters and a son. He was buried on 14 November 2014 in a ceremony attended by various heads of state.
