= Timeline of the Anglophone Crisis (2017) =

Conflict, started 2017, in Cameroon

This is a timeline of the Anglophone Crisis in Cameroon during 2017.

The Anglophone Crisis is an ongoing armed conflict in the Republic of Cameroon in Central Africa, where historically English-speaking Ambazonian separatists are seeking the independence of the former British trust territory of Southern Cameroons, which was unified with Cameroon since 1961.

== September ==
- On 9 September, the Ambazonia Defence Council (ADC) declared the deployment of the Ambazonia Defence Forces (ADF) and the launching of combat operations to achieve the independence of Ambazonia. The ADF carried out a guerilla attack against military base in Besongabang, Manyu Division. The ADF commander in charge claimed his soldiers managed to return to base unreduced. Three Cameroonian soldiers were killed in the attack.
- On 11 September, a bomb targeting security forces was detonated in the city of Bamenda. ADF claimed responsibility for the attack.
- On 21 September, an improvised bomb wounded three police officers in Bamenda. Separatists were blamed for the attack, which the governor described as an act of terrorism.
- On 22 September, Cameroonian troops opened fire against Anglophone protestors. According to eyewitnesses, five people were shot dead and many more were injured. In Ekok, 700 protesters attacked police stations and hosted the Ambazonian flag in public spaces.
- On 29 September, Cameroonian soldiers moved into Eyumodjock, and took over a farm belonging to separatist leader Sisiku Julius Ayuk Tabe.
- Throughout September, seven schools were burned.

== October ==
- On 1 October, Ambazonia unilaterally declared its independence, and the Cameroonian Army moved into the region in force to fight the separatists. Tens of thousands of people protested in the streets in favor of independence. At least eight people died in clashes between police and demonstrators in Buea and Bamenda. In total, 20 demonstrators were killed by security forces that day. The separatists strategically choose this date for mass demonstrations, as it is the anniversary for the unification of Cameroon and Southern Cameroons.
- On 2 October, a mentally disabled man was beaten to unconsciousness by soldiers in Kumbo.
- On 9 October, the Cameroonian military claimed to have stopped "hundreds of Nigerian fighters" from entering Southern Cameroons to join the struggle.
- On 17 October, hundreds of young people set fire to the Catholic Primary School in Menji, Lebialem.

== November ==
- On 8 November, the ADF killed two or three Cameroonian gendarmes in Bamenda. The ADF claimed responsibility for the attacks, which were condemned by the Interim Government of Ambazonia, which had not yet endorsed an armed struggle.
- On 9 November, Cameroon issued international arrest warrants for 15 separatist leaders, including President Sisiku Ayuk Tabe. Two Cameroonian soldiers were killed by separatists in two attacks the following night.
- On 14 November, there were four bombings in Bamenda, none of which caused any casualties.
- On 19 November, unidentified gunmen killed a policeman in Bamenda.
- On 24 November, parts of the Government Bilingual High School in Menji was burned down.
- On 29 November, separatists attacked a military convoy in Mamfe, killing two soldiers and two policemen. One soldier escaped with wounds. The separatist fighters seized a large amount of weapons before taking off.
- On 30 November, separatists fighters killed five policemen and a soldier in Eyumodjock. The attackers claimed to be loyal to SCACUF, a separatist movement in exile.
- Throughout November, eight soldiers, at least 14 civilians and five fugitives were confirmed killed due to the conflict. Based on the combined figures from news reports, the real number of deaths was clearly higher.

== December ==
- On 1 December, ahead of a planned Cameroonian offensive, authorities in the Manyu Department ordered people from 16 villages to evacuate, saying that anyone defying those orders will be treated as separatists.
- On 4 December, the Cameroonian government officially declared war on "these terrorists who seek secession", referring to the ADF.
- On 7 December, Cameroonian forces retook the villages of Bafia and Muyenge.
- On 9 December, an attack on a military post near Mamfe left six separatists and one Cameroonian police officer dead. The Cameroonian government claimed that 200 guerillas took part in the attack, using guns, spears and machetes.
- On 13 December 23 people, including minors, were arrested by security forces in Dadi and subsequently subjected to severe torture. One of those arrested would later die in jail.
- On 14 December, an elite army unit started an operation to retake villages that were controlled by the separatists. In the village of Bodam, soldiers fired indiscriminately at fleeing civilians, and executed one elderly man who tried to defend himself with a cane. Several houses were burned during the attack. Most of the villagers fled to Nigeria.
- On 15 December, days of heavy fighting in Mamfe came to an end. Both sides claimed victory, with the Cameroonian Army claiming to have retaken Mamfe from the ADF, while the ADF claimed it had never occupied Mamfe to begin with.
- On 18 December, four gendarmes were killed by separatists in Kembong.
- On 20 December, Nigerian sources claimed Cameroonian soldiers crossed the border into Nigeria in pursuit of separatist fighters. While the governments of both Nigeria and Cameroon denied that any such incidents had taken place, Cameroonian military officials had previously accused Nigeria of sheltering separatists.
- Between 18–23 December, Cameroonian troops destroyed dozens of houses and killed, beat and arrested several civilians in Kembong and Babong, Manyu Department, in retaliation for the killing of security forces.
- On 25 December, two gendarmes and a Brigade Commander were wounded in Toko, Ndian Division. The residence of the Civil Administrator of Toko was also burned down.
- At some point in December, soldiers from the Rapid Intervention Battalion allegedly fired indiscriminately at villagers in Kajifu, killing at least three people.
