= Belo, Cameroon =

Coordinates: 6°08′N 10°15′E

Belo
- Commune and town
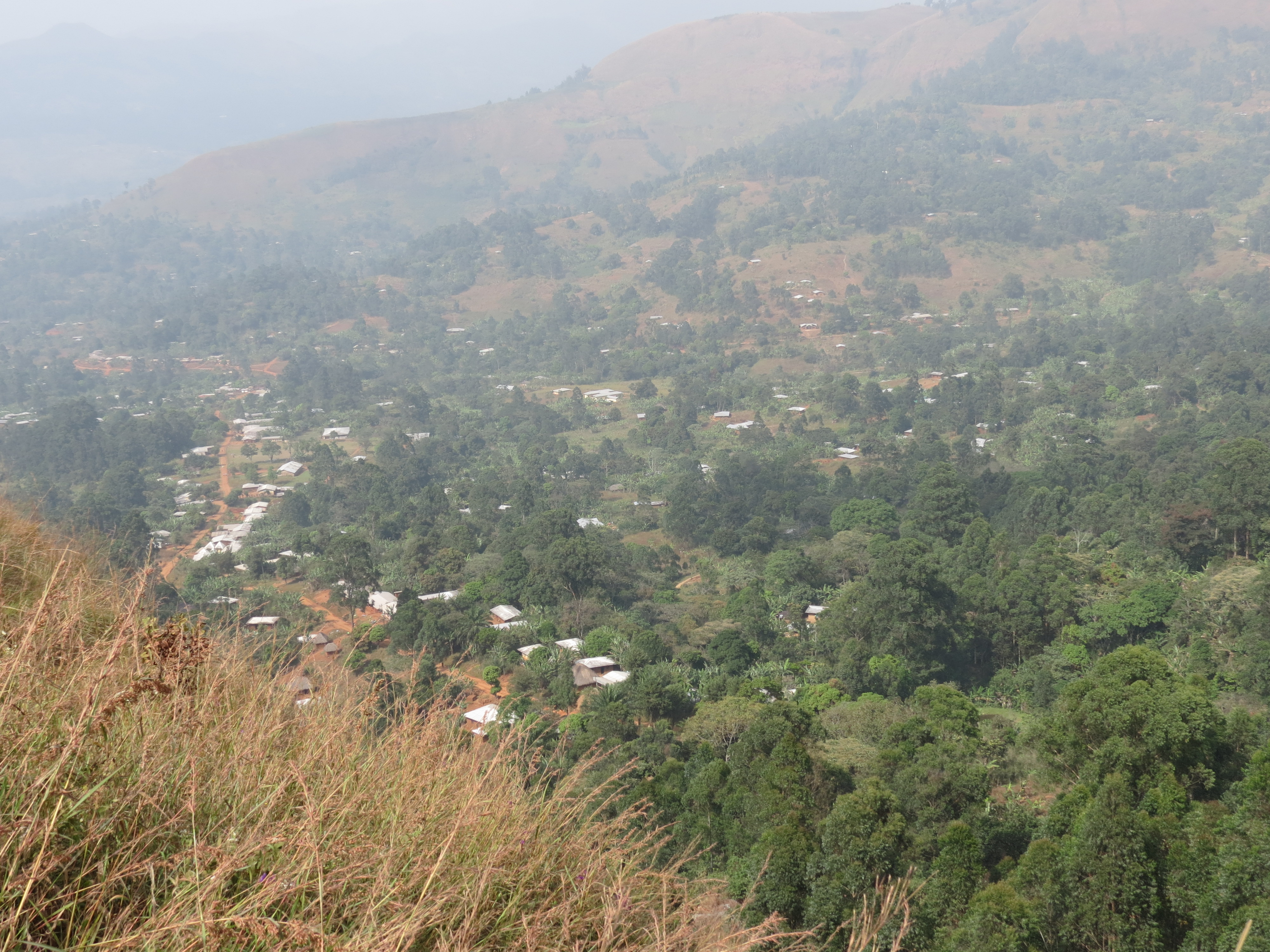
- Interactive map of Belo
- Country: Cameroon
- Region: Northwest
- Department: Boyo
- Time zone: UTC+1 (WAT)

Belo is a town and commune in Northwest Region of Cameroon. It is mainly populated by Kom people.

== History ==
In April 2018, during the Anglophone Crisis, the town came under control of separatists fighting for the independence of Ambazonia. The Cameroonian Army later retook the town, which was depopulated due to the fighting.

On National Day in 2024, separatist fighters killed the mayor of Belo and two other people.

== See also ==
- Communes of Cameroon
