= Warren M. Robbins =

American art collector (1923–2008)

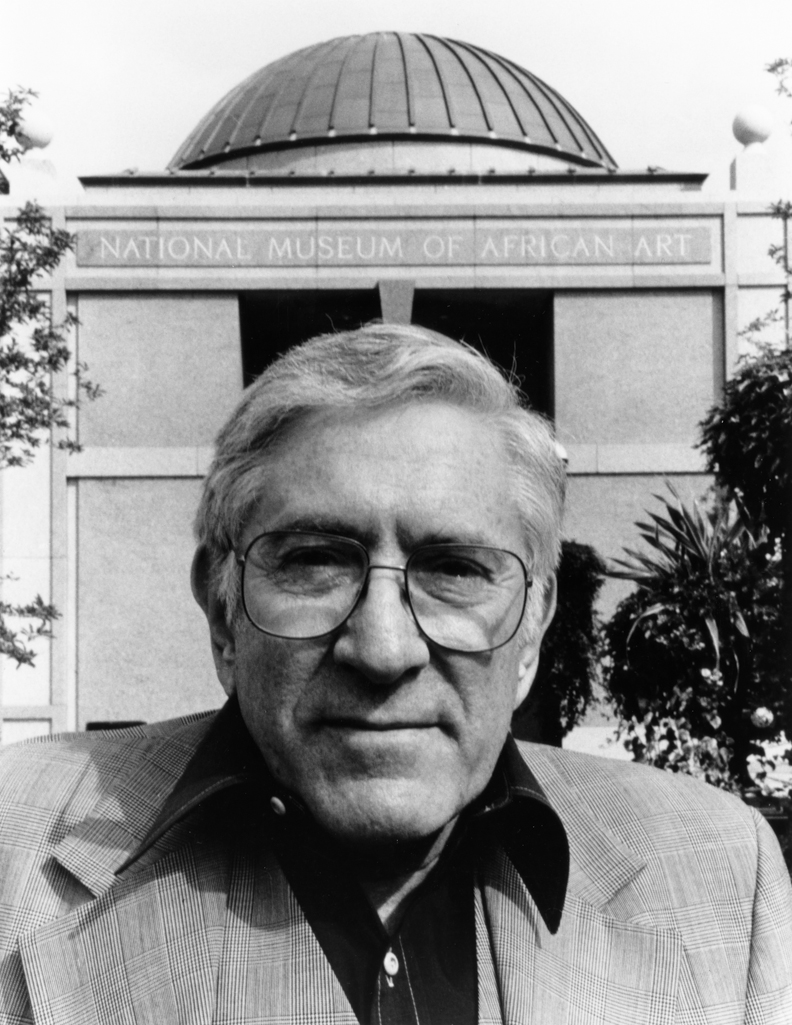
- Warren M. Robbins at the Smithsonian's National Museum of African Art
- Born: September 4, 1923; Worcester, Massachusetts
- Died: December 4, 2008; Washington, D.C.
- Resting place: Congressional Cemetery
- Citizenship: United States
- Education: University of New Hampshire, University of Michigan
- Occupations: Art collector, diplomat, cultural affairs officer
- Organization(s): Department of State, Smithsonian Institution
- Known for: Founding the National Museum of African Art
- Spouse: Lydia Puccinelli

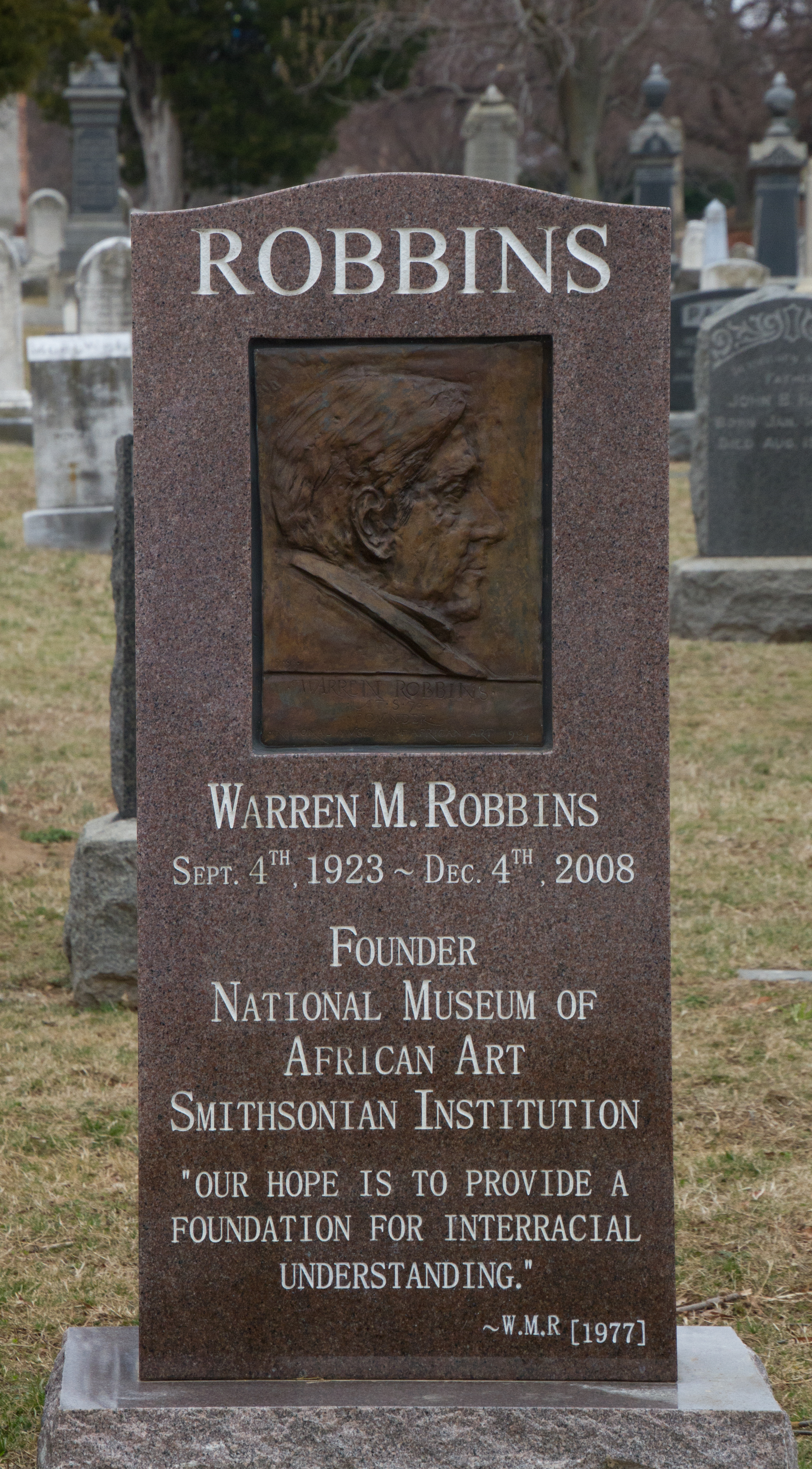
Grave of Warren M. Robbins at Congressional Cemetery

Warren Murray Robbins (September 4, 1923 – December 4, 2008) was an American art collector whose collection of African art led to the formation of the National Museum of African Art at the Smithsonian Institution.

Robbins was born in Worcester, Massachusetts, on September 4, 1923, to Jewish immigrants from Ukraine. He attend the University of New Hampshire where he earned a bachelor's degree in English in 1945. He was awarded a master's degree from the University of Michigan in 1949, majoring in history. After graduating from college, he taught briefly at Nurnberg American High School and then became a cultural affairs officer for the Department of State.

While working as a cultural attaché for the State Department at the United States Embassy in Bonn, he was walking the streets of Hamburg in the late 1950s or early 1960s with future United States Senator S. I. Hayakawa when he impulsively entered into an antiques shop and spent $15 on a carved-wood figure of a man and woman, the work of the Yoruba people of Nigeria. Back in Hamburg a year later, he spent $1,000 on 32 African masks, textiles and other pieces in a different shop.

Returning to the United States, Robbins purchased a home in Washington, D.C. which he decorated with the 33 items he had brought back from Europe, and adorned the rooms with tropical plants to evoke the jungles of Africa. After an article was printed about his collection in The Washington Post, he invited in curious visitors who started appearing at his door to take a look. He created this informal museum in his basement as part of an effort to promote cultural communication during the Civil Rights Movement. Robbins was unapologetic in the face of complaints that he was a white man operating a museum of African art, noting that "I make no apologies for being white. You don't have to be Chinese to appreciate ancient ceramics, and you don't have to be a fish to be an ichthyologist."

He established the beginnings of a freestanding museum near Capitol Hill in 1963, raising $13,000 and taking a mortgage to purchase for $35,000 half of a home at 316-18 A Street Northeast that had been the residence of abolitionist Frederick Douglass from 1871 to 1877. When it opened in May 1964, it was the first museum in the United States dedicated to African art exclusively. The Frederick Douglass Institute of Negro Arts and History was established in 1966. In addition to Robbins' existing collection, the museum also displayed items borrowed from Life magazine photographer Eliot Elisofon and items on loan from the University of Pennsylvania Museum.

In succeeding years, Robbins raised money to acquire the remaining half of the Douglass house, naming it the Museum of African Art. As the collection grew, he purchased adjoining residences, with his museum ultimately including nine townhouses, 16 garages and two carriage houses.

His first visit to Africa was in 1973, by which time his museum's collections had grown to 5,000 pieces with a staff of 20. Robbins had raised funds to purchase from a Manhattan art gallery a bearded icon called Afo-A-Kom, considered sacred by the Kom people of West Africa, which had been taken from a hill-top village in Cameroon in 1966. Returning the figure, Robbins was welcomed by Nsom Nggue, then king of the Kom people, greeted by men and women in tribal dress.

Robbins lobbied his friends in Congress to have the Smithsonian Institution assume management of the collection, which took place in 1979. He was the museum's first director, remaining in the position until 1983 when he was named founding director emeritus and a Smithsonian senior scholar, and replaced as director by Sylvia H. Williams. The museum was relocated to the National Mall in 1987 and renamed the National Museum of African Art. By the time of his death in 2008, the Museum included more than nine thousand objects from Africa, including headdresses, pottery, copper reliefs, musical instruments, baskets, and ceremonial objects, as well as more than 30 thousand volumes on African art, culture and history.

Robbins died at age 85 on December 4, 2008 at George Washington University Hospital from complications resulting from a fall at his home a month before his death. His interment was at Congressional Cemetery.
