= Timeline of the Anglophone Crisis =

This is a timeline of events related to the Anglophone Crisis. This entry is divided into the following articles:

- Timeline of the Anglophone Crisis (2017)
- Timeline of the Anglophone Crisis (2018)
- Timeline of the Anglophone Crisis (2019)
- Timeline of the Anglophone Crisis (2020)
- Timeline of the Anglophone Crisis (2021)
- Timeline of the Anglophone Crisis (2022)
- Timeline of the Anglophone Crisis (2023)
- Timeline of the Anglophone Crisis (2024)
- Timeline of the Anglophone Crisis (2025)
- Timeline of the Anglophone Crisis (2026)
