= Lydia Puccinelli =

American museum exhibition curator

Lydia Marie Puccinelli-Robbins
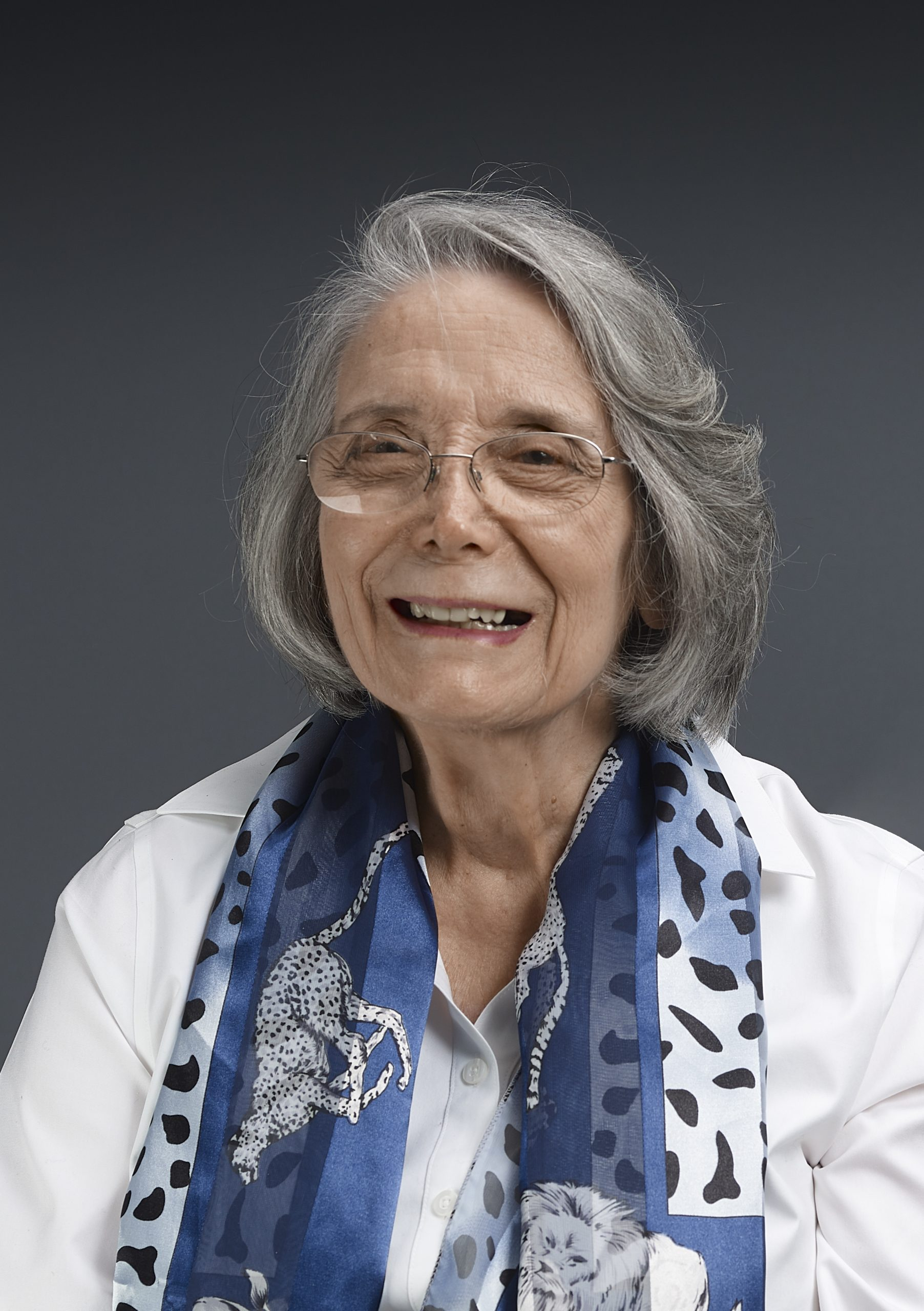
- Photo of Lydia Puccinelli
- Born: December 7, 1930; Pittsburgh, Pennsylvania
- Died: December 27, 2023 (aged 93)
- Education: The School of Art, Cooper Union; the Aspen School of Art
- Known for: Curator of National Museum of African Art
- Spouse: Warren M. Robbins
- Elected: Smithsonian Institution, the Robbins Center for Cross-Cultural Communication

Lydia Puccinelli (born Lydia Marie Puccinelli-Robbins; December 7, 1930 – December 27, 2023) was an American exhibition designer, curatorial assistant, registrar and curator of exhibitions and of collections.

== Early life and education ==
Born on December 7, 1930, Lydia Puccinelli was became interested in art in her early life. She briefly attended Carnegie Mellon University, but, discovering art's creative and expressive capabilities, she then attended the Cooper Union School of Art majoring painting and graduated in 1959. She was later accepted by Yale University, while also studying painting at the Aspen School of Art in Colorado. Interested in textiles, she also studied textile design and designed textiles for large American textile firms.

== Career ==
=== The African Art Museum ===
In 1966, Puccinelli was told that she was suitable for a position at a new museum on Capitol Hill, then known as the African Art Museum. There she met her husband Warren M. Robbins, also the founder of the African Art Museum. After she joined, Puccinelli was gradually promoted from Designer to Curator of Exhibitions. The African Art Museum initially consisted of Warren Robbins' personal collections, which include artworks from different African tribes such as Mali, Kongo, and Dogon. Later, Robbins' collections would grow to 9100 pieces, all of which were managed by Puccinelli and Robbins.In 1979, when the museum was merged into the Smithsonian, Puccinelli was promoted to Curator and directed over 75 exhibitions and 3 catalogues. In 2000, she retired from the Museum.

=== Personal Connections with African Art ===
Puccinelli received honors for her great contributions to promoting cultural communication with African art, and she personally devoted herself to the studies of African art. She visited Africa personally in 1974 and 1981. She studied African art collections in museums at Amsterdam, Belgium, Paris, London, Oxford, Vienna, and Germany, funded by the Museum Professional Fellowship grant.
