= Njinikom =

Coordinates: 6°14′N 10°17′E

- Commune and town
- Interactive map of Njinikom
- Country: Cameroon
- Region: Northwest
- Department: Boyo
- Time zone: UTC+1 (WAT)

Njinikom is a town and commune in Northwest Region of Cameroon. It is mainly populated by Kom people.

== See also ==
- Communes of Cameroon
