= Bomaka =

Coordinates: 4°09′33″N 9°18′27″E

Bomaka is a locality in Buea, Cameroon. The area has been a flashpoint of the Anglophone Crisis.

== Notable Sites ==
Bomaka has the sacred heart parish of Bomaka, Holly Trinity foundation clinic Bomaka, Zindatal kindergarten and primary school Bomaka
