= Laikom =

Capital of the Kom people in Cameroon

Coordinates: 6°15′N 10°20′E

Laikom is the capital of the Kom people in Cameroon. It is in Laikom province. It is home to the Kom royalty.

The Frobenius Institute published a study of the royal court architecture.

The Metropolitan Museum of Art in New York City contains a photograph of Laikom taken by Paul Gebauer in 1940.
