= Oshie, Cameroon =

Oshie
- Location in Cameroon
- Coordinates: 6°07′N 9°53′E
- Country: Cameroon
- Province: Northwest Province

Oshie is a small mountainous village covering approximately 70 square kilometers. It is located in the English-speaking Northwest Province of Cameroon. It is located to the east of Njikwa Sub-division in Momo Division and forms a geographical gate way into Njikwa. Oshie is a land of rich physical diversity and presents an undulating landscape which is an extension of the Bamboutos Highlands of the Western Highlands of Cameroon. It is a centre of Garri production.

== Population ==
2004 population projections placed the population of the village at 10,822 inhabitants. This population is structured into families that were born out of two principal families; Andek and Oyemi. Though the population is made up predominantly of indigenes, the society is ethnically and religiously pluralistic, yet very peaceful. Most of the inhabitants speak the Ngishe language, of which Oshie is the main centre. The village is structured into quarters with Nyebai, Beimban, Barimbom, Nyikob, Fum, Fringyen and Bereje being the main quarters. They are further broken into sub quarters each under a quarter head.

== History ==
The present site was initially inhabited by the Konda and Beba people, who were driven out by the migrant Oshie people. Early settlement sites were places such as Tikob, Edek, and Togobeiku. These sites were chosen for defensive purposes, taking advantage of the strategic landscape. The people who make up part of the semi Bantu ethnic group of Cameroon are said to have originated from Mbeitong near Ntadkon in present day Mezam Division in the Northwest Province. These people were forced to migrate south because of the spread of Islam in west and central Africa. They then migrated in two waves; first through Oshum, Widikum and Ngie, the second through Njinibi and Frigyien.
