= Fundong =

Coordinates: 6°15′N 10°16′E

- Commune and town
- Interactive map of Fundong
- Country: Cameroon
- Region: Northwest
- Department: Boyo

Government
  - Mayor: Lazarus Tchatchouang
- Time zone: UTC+1 (WAT)

Fundong (Kom: Fɨ̀ndoŋ) is a town and commune in Cameroon. It is the capital of Boyo Division, with a population of about 20,000. It is situated about 80 km from Bamenda, the regional headquarters of the North West region.

The population of Fundong is mostly rural, with farming as primary occupation, and is mainly populated by Kom people.

The Catholic Church community in Fundong is supported by Mill Hill Missionaries.

== See also ==
- Communes of Cameroon

== Sources ==
- Site de la primature - Élections municipales 2002 (in French)
- Contrôle de gestion et performance des services publics communaux des villes camerounaises - Thèse de Donation Avele, Université Montesquieu Bordeaux IV (in French)
- Charles Nanga, La réforme de l’administration territoriale au Cameroun à la lumière de la loi constitutionnelle n° 96/06 du 18 janvier 1996, Mémoire ENA. (in French)
