= Eyumodjock =

Coordinates: 5.7697°N 8.9864°E

Eyumojock
- Commune and town
- Interactive map of Eyumojock
- Country: Cameroon
- Region: Southwest Region
- Department: Manyu
- Time zone: UTC+1 (WAT)

Eyumojock is a town and commune in Cameroon, and the sub-divisional headquarters of the Eyumojock sub-division in the Manyu division. The small volcanic Lake Ejagham is near the town. Current mayor of the Eyumojock Council is Jacques Ayamba Ita.

== See also ==
- Communes of Cameroon
