= Kom people (Cameroon) =

Ethnic group in Cameroon

Founded in 1800, the Kom are one of the 250 ethnic groups that are located in the grasslands of Cameroon within the Boyo Division of Africa. Kom includes most of Boyo division, including such towns as Fundong, Belo, Njinikom and Mbingo. The area can be reached from Bamenda on the so-called Ring Road.

The Kom are one of the principal ethnic groups of the North-West province of Cameroon, where traditional government institutions are very important. The capital, Laikom, is the seat of the ruler, the Fon, and his advisors, the Quifon, who continue to be the most respected leaders despite the imposition of a central Cameroonian government. Vincent Yuh II died in November 2017 and Fon Ndzi II who took over the seat "disappeared" and a transition of the 15th Monarch of Kom took place on July 19, 2026. The Cameroonian government recognizes to some degree the authority of the Fons and local chiefs subject to them. The elaborate language and rich culture of Kom are very similar to neighbouring groups, collectively known as the Tikar. The Kom language is also called Kom or Itangikom, a non-written language.

== History ==
During the 18th century migration in Cameroon, most tribes moved south in search of better economic opportunities. The Kom people, who originated from upper Mbam in Tikari, moved in search of fertile soils. They first settled in Babessi. While in Babessi, their population began to grow drastically, and rapidly. The Fon of Babessi feared a possible attack from the Kom people. He then tricked the Fon of kom (Muni) into believing that the increase in their male population may some day lead to them being overthrown. The fon of Kom believed this and subsequently accepted his proposal to burn all the healthy men in two separate rooms.

After the act was committed, the Fon of Kom realized that he had been tricked. The Babessi Fon had built a secret door for his men to escape when the fire started. Unable to bear the loss and betrayal, the Fon of Kom committed suicide by hanging himself. He died without a son. Legend has it that a python appeared and led the people of Kom to their present settlement in Laikom. For more information on Kom see Nkwi(2012 and 2015)

Citation Nkwi, W. G. (2011, May 24). Kfaang and its technologies : towards a social history of mobility in Kom, Cameroon, 1928-1998. African studies collection. Retrieved from https://hdl.handle.net/1887/17674

== Government and politics ==
The Kom tribe covers ¾ of the Boyo division. The capital of Kom is Laikom, and it is made up of over 43 villages. Their system of politics is highly hierarchal. The tribe is ruled by a king or Fon (Fondom) and followed by the traditional parliament/legislative assembly (kwifoyn). The Fon rules with the help and respect of his people and is highly regarded and praised within his community. In Kom as elsewhere in the Bamenda Grassfields, it is the executive arm of the traditional government. The system of government of checks and balances suggests the democratic process of indigenous African civilization. However, Its job is to make sure that the Fon's orders are followed to the letter. Besides the traditional prime minister is the council of elders (nchidoh). Unlike any other elderly person in the Kom indigenous society, this set of people can easily be recognized by the red feather they carry on their hats. After the nchidoh, is the village head. He is also the spiritual leader of the villages. He takes orders from the Kwifoyn and implements them.

== Spirituality and religion ==
As a result of the introduction of the colonial church in the 19th century, Kom social hierarchies were changed.

When Fon Ndi took the throne in 1926, he legitimized Christianity and allowed for churches to be built, against the desires of the previous Fon. With Christianity being more present, the Fon's power gradually decreased in the 1960s and 1970s. New roles developed including catechists, pupils, teachers, students, and workers who adhered to the colonial regime rather than the Kom's traditional values and hierarchies, and thus a continuation of the decline of his power.

== Economy and agriculture ==
Agriculture and trade is the predominant form of income for the Kom peoples. Because of fertile soil and moderate temperatures, many crops are farmed in the community. Maize, guinea corn, cocoyams, and yams are sold and traded, with the women of the community doing most of the farming. Men within the community handle tree cultures like raffia palms, plantains, and coffee. Coffee is the only cash crop produced in Kom. In trade, there are many cooperative unions that help in the marketing of coffee. Locally dyed cloths are also sold. Many Kom retailers buy stuff from places like Nigeria, Bamenda and Bafoussam. Some buy right from Dubai; to retail in the main towns of Fundong, Njinikom and Belo.

== Society ==
Kom society is patriarchal. Males hold the vast majority of power and privilege, while females labour mostly in domestic roles in kitchens and on farms. A man's power and wealth is measured by the number of his wives. Polygamy is a thing of pride. This makes a man with one wife voiceless in a men's gathering. Girls get married as young as 15 years old.

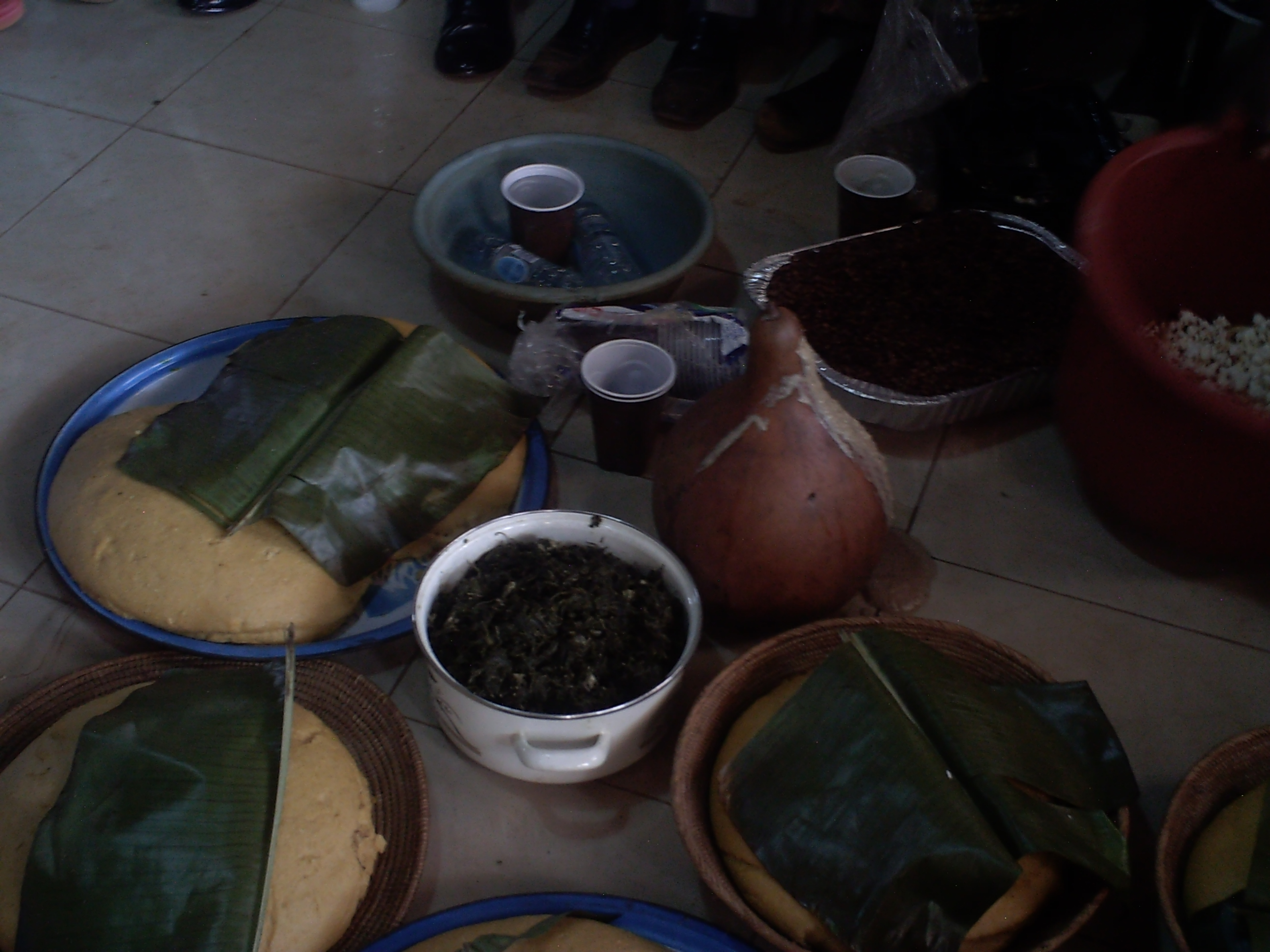
Food at traditional wedding

Although Kom males hold most of the power in day-to-day affairs, Kom society is matrilineal in matters of succession. In this way, Kom society differs significantly from other tribes of Cameroon. Lineage in the Kom culture continues on the side of the mother and not the father in such a way that when an adult Kom male dies, ownership of his property including his compound, wives and children is transferred to his nephew (son of his sister) and not his own son. The process of matrilineal succession in Kom society is more complex if a deceased male did not have a nephew to inherit his property. In this case, succession is continued on the side of first cousin. As of the late 20th century, this practice is growing obsolete.

Kom society also places a great emphasis on respect for elders.

Although there has been a large amount of social change within the Kom culture, oral tradition within the community is still very significant and contributes to the annual festival that is hosted by the Fon. Food that is traditionally served at these events can be found all over the Kom community. This includes Abain and Bas, which is corn-fufu and vegetables, and khati-khati to help the Abain and Bas enter the stomach quickly.

== Art and performance ==
Art within the Kom community is extremely important. Although not much history on their art is easily found, a very significant piece of art, the Afo-A-Kom, is an important story retold by the Kom and is well known among the Kom people. The Afo-A-Kom is a life-size beaded wooden figure said to be the most sacred item in the kingdom. It was stolen in from the Laikom palace in 1966 and then sold to a New York art dealer. The Cameroon Government was aware of the Afo-A-Kom's location in 1973 and immediately demanded that the possessor, the Furman Gallery, return it. This brought about discourse regarding repatriation and started conversations about returning art that was stolen from Africans because of colonialism, and a New York Times article was written. The Afo-A-Kom was eventually sold by the Gallery to a businessman, who returned it to the Kom people.

Other sculptures and figures were also prominent in the Cameroon area.

There are numerous dance groups like the Njang and chong, which performs in many occasions including funerals. Prince Yerima Afo’o kom and Ateh Bazor are two of Kom's most prominent folklore musicians. The following are the performances and displays of culture that happen within the Kom community:

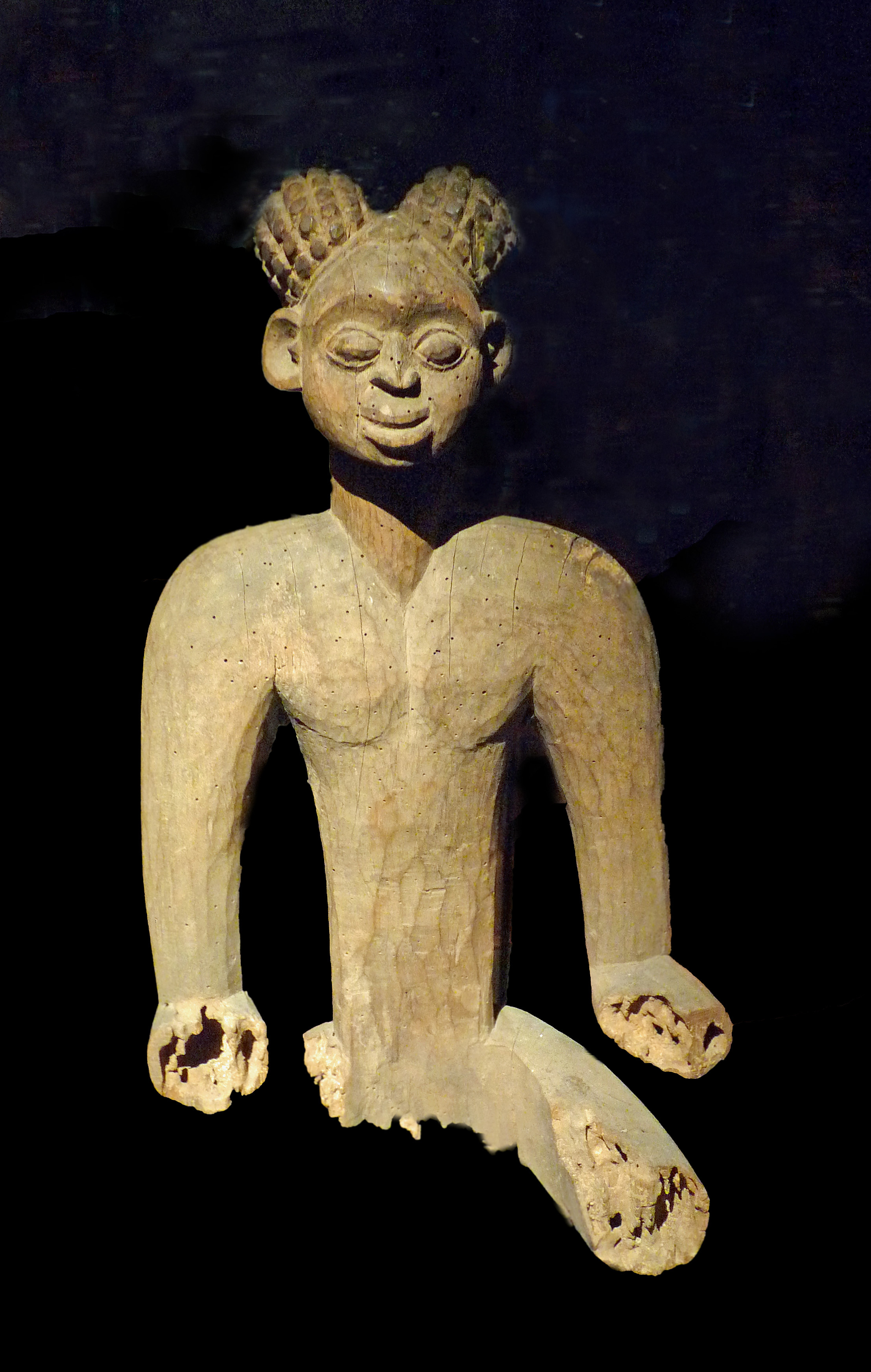
Anthropomorphic figure; 19th century; wood; from Cameroon; Musée du quai Branly (Paris)

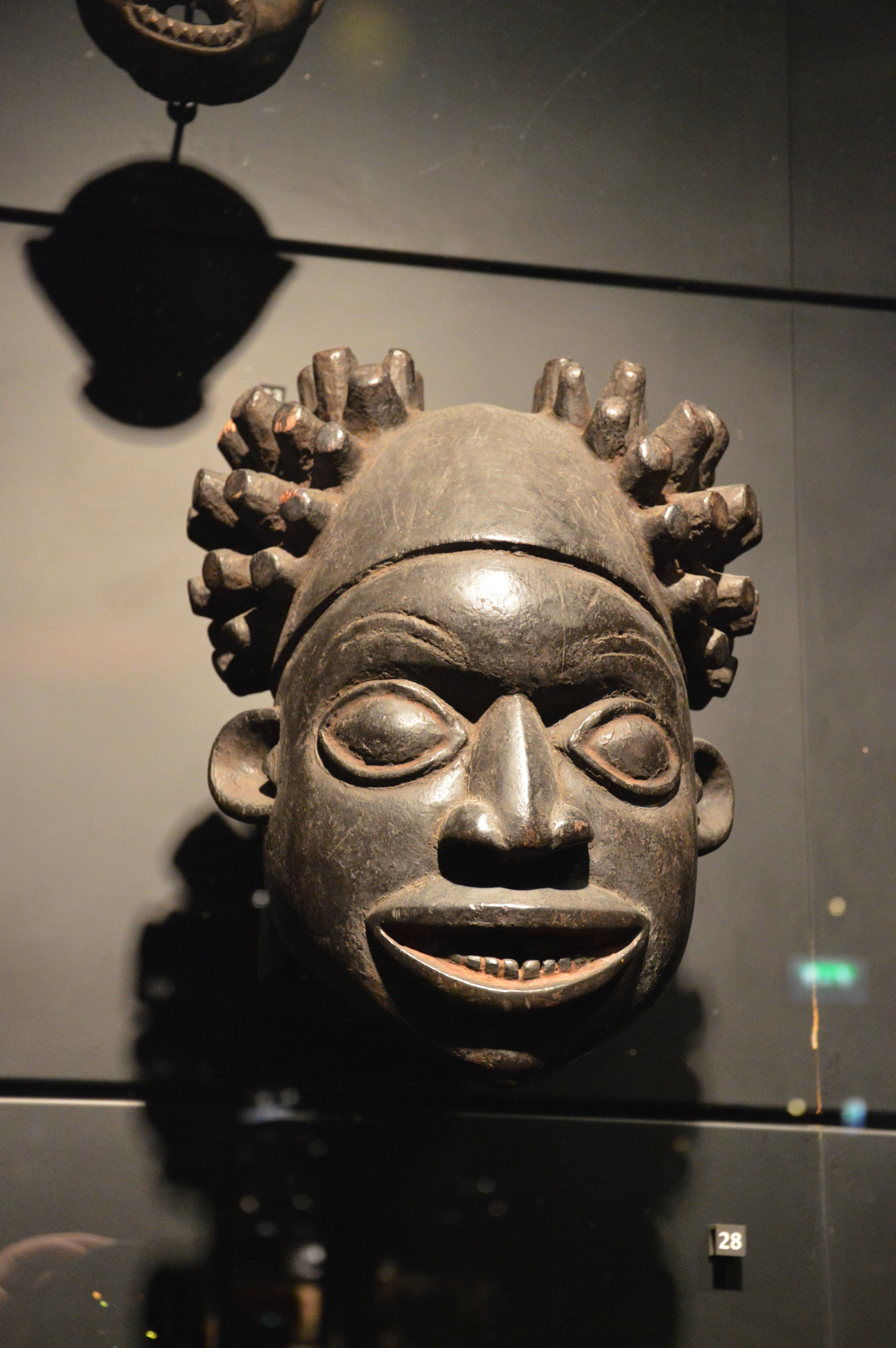
Anthropomorphic mask; 19th–20th century; wood; from Cameroon; Musée du quai Branly

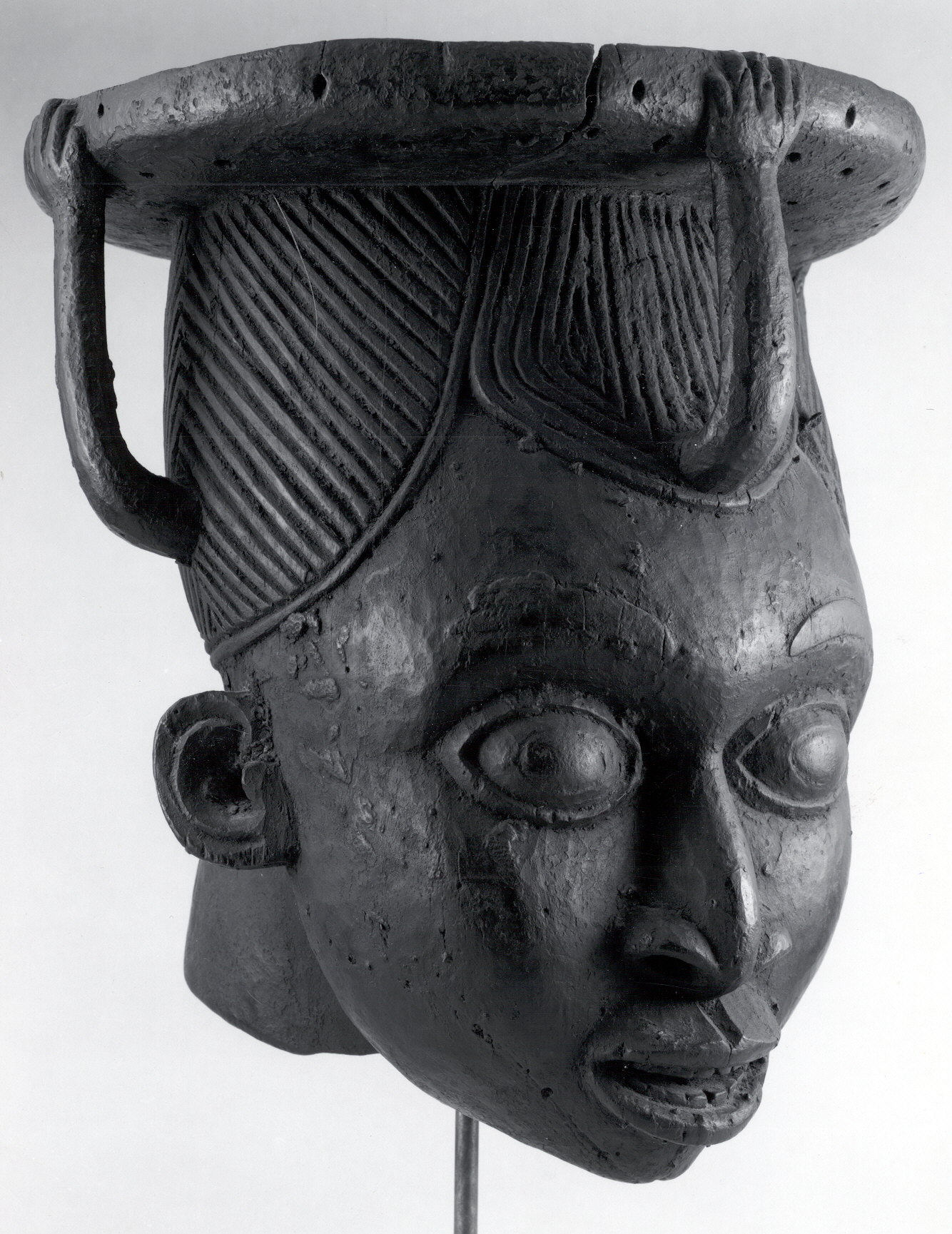
Black-and-white photo of a helmet mask; circa 1830–1855; wood, iron, copper, pigment & wax; Metropolitan Museum of Art (New York City)

Njong-Kom: This performance is the done by the military group of the Kom kwifon and is done by men within the community. The men fire off guns in the air to show the Fon their power and their preparation.

Chong Society: One of the most prestigious titles within the Kom community, those who belong to the Chong Society have completed many requirements to be a part of it. The dancers of this group are highly respected for their work. Although the group is mostly men, women will sometimes perform with the Chong at funeral celebrations.

Njangwain: A performance mostly done by women, the Njanwain is a very important performance that stresses the importance of oral tradition within the Kom culture. The songs that are sung during the performance are memorized and passed on to the audience. The songs are very symbolic and express the lifetime of the African and is reflective of the human condition. This performance is done at marriages, birth celebrations, and other important events, like the annual Kom festivals.

Njang-fubom: This dance is performed by both men and women within the Kom community to entertain and promote the culture.

Juju dancing: A masquerade dance performed exclusively by men. Women are not allowed to enter the Juju houses because the rituals that take place are for men's eyes only.

Kom Royal Dance: This dance was originally reserved for princesses, but the modern dance is performed by the Kom people for women who are getting ready for marriage. The Fimbang dance is performed to show the beauty and importance of women.
