= Kom language (Cameroon) =

Grassfields language spoken in Cameroon

Kom
- Itaŋikom
- Native to: Cameroon
- Region: North-West Province
- Native speakers: 210,000 (2005)
- Language family: Niger–Congo?: Atlantic–Congo; Benue–Congo; Southern Bantoid; Grassfields; Ring; Center; Kom

Language codes
- ISO 639-3: bkm
- Glottolog: komc1235

The Kom language (also Itaŋikom) is the language spoken by the Kom people in Northwest Province in Cameroon. It is classified as a Central Ring language of the Grassfields, Southern Bantoid languages in the Niger-Congo language family. Kom is a tonal language with three tones.

== Phonology ==
=== Consonants ===
Kom consonants
	Bilabial	Labio- dental		Alveolar		Palatal		Labial- velar	Velar	
Plosive	b			t	d	c	ɟ		k	ɡ
Fricative		f	v	s	z					ɣ
Nasal	m				n		ɲ			ŋ
Approximant							j	w		
Lateral					l					

=== Vowels ===
Kom vowels
	Front		Central		Back
Close	i		ɨ	ʉ	u
Mid	e	œ			o
Open	æ		a		

== Orthography ==
Kom uses a 29-character Latin-script orthography based on the General Alphabet of Cameroon Languages. It contains 20 single characters from the ISO set, six digraphs, and three special characters: barred I (Ɨɨ), eng (Ŋŋ), and an apostrophe (’). The digraphs ae and oe are also written as ligatures æ and œ, respectively.

Kom alphabet
Letters	a	ae	b	ch	d	e	f	g	gh	i	ɨ	j	’	k	l	m	n	ŋ	ny	o	oe	s	t	u	ue	v	w	y	z
IPA	/a/	/æ/	/b/	/c/	/d/	/e/	/f/	/g/	/ɣ/	/i/	/ɨ/	/ɟ/	/ʔ/	/k/	/l/	/m/	/n/	/ŋ/	/ɲ/	/o/	/œ/	/s/	/t/	/u/	/ʉ/	/v/	/w/	/j/	/z/

The orthography is mostly phonemic, although the characters ae, oe, ue, and ’ represent allophonic variations: the three vowel digraphs are the product of vowel coalescence, and the apostrophe represents the glottal stop, a syllable-final variant of /k/.

Although Kom has eight phonetic tones, only two are marked in writing: the low tone [˨] is written with a grave accent (◌̀) over the vowel (e.g. kàe [kæ̀] "four"), and the high-low falling tone [˦˨] is written with a circumflex (◌̂) over the vowel (e.g. kâf [kâf] "armpit").

== Bibliography ==
- Shultz, George, 1997a, Kom Language Grammar Sketch Part 1, SIL Cameroon
- Shultz, George, 1997b, Notes on Discourse features of Kom Narrative Texts, SIL Cameroon
- Jones, Randy, compiler. 2001. Provisional Kom - English lexcion. Yaoundé, Cameroon: SIL
