= Boyo (department) =

- Department
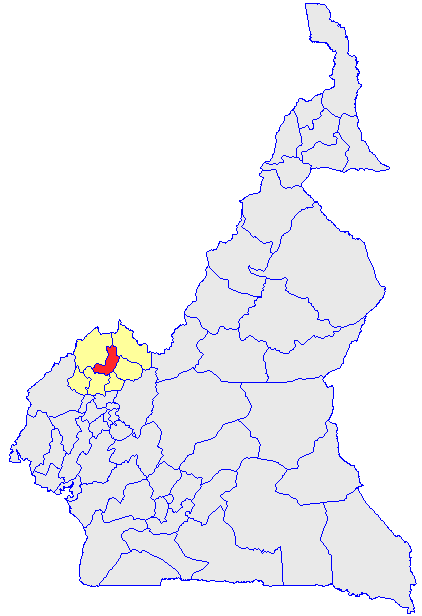
- Department location in Cameroon
- Coordinates: 6.3144°N 10.4095°E
- Country: Cameroon
- Province: Northwest Province
- Capital: Fundong

Area
  - Total: 615 sq mi (1,592 km^{2})

Population (2001)
  - Total: 169,725
- Time zone: UTC+1 (WAT)

Boyo is a department of Northwest Province in Cameroon. The department covers an area of 1,592 km^{2} and as of 2001 had a total population of 169,725. The capital of the department lies at Fundong.

== Subdivisions ==
Boyo Division is divided administratively into 4 subdivisions and in turn into villages. The four subdivisions are

=== Communes ===
1. Belo
2. Bum
3. Fundong
4. Njinikom

== See also ==
- Communes of Cameroon
