= Northwest Region (Cameroon) =

Region of Cameroon

- Region of Cameroon with special status
- Seal

- Location of the Northwest Region within Cameroon
- Coordinates: 6°20′N 10°30′E
- Country: Cameroon
- Capital: Bamenda
- Departments: Boyo, Bui, Donga-Mantung, Menchum, Mezam, Momo, Ngo-Ketunjia (Ngoketunjia)

Government
  - Governor: Adolphe Lele Lafrique
  - President of the Regional Assembly & Executive Council: Fru Fobuzshi Angwafo III

Area
  - Total: 17,300 km^{2} (6,700 sq mi)

Population (2015)
  - Total: 1,968,578
  - Density: 114/km^{2} (295/sq mi)
- ISO 3166 code: CM-NW
- HDI (2022): 0.560 medium · 6th of 10

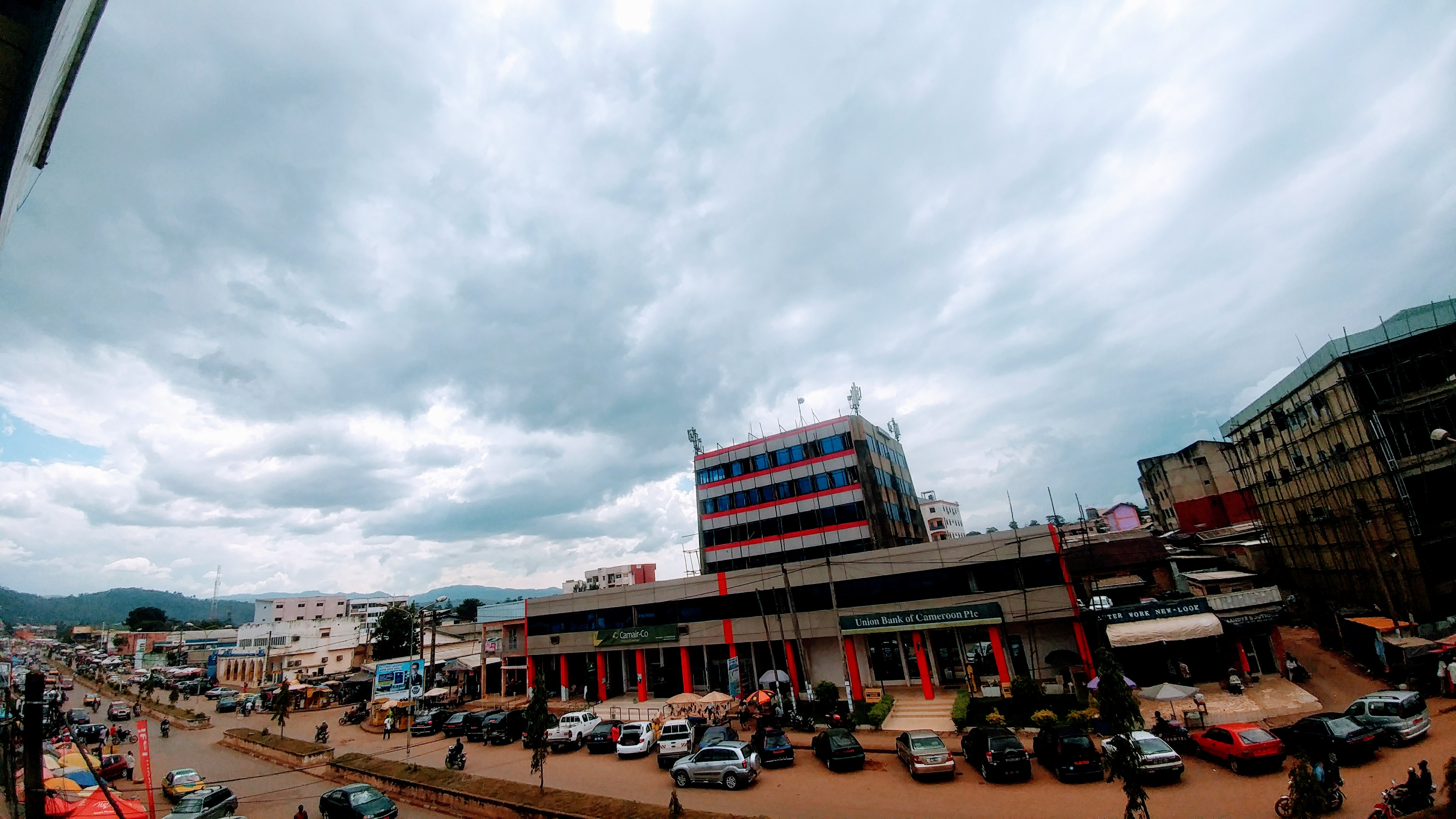
Commercial Avenue, Bamenda town

The Northwest Region, or North-West Region (French: Région du Nord-Ouest) is a region with special status in Cameroon. Its capital is Bamenda. The Northwest Region was part of the Southern Cameroons, found in the western highlands of Cameroon. It is bordered to the southwest by the Southwest Region, to the south by the West Region, to the east by the Adamawa Region, and to the north by Nigeria. Various Ambazonian nationalist and separatist factions regard the region as being distinct as a polity from Cameroon.

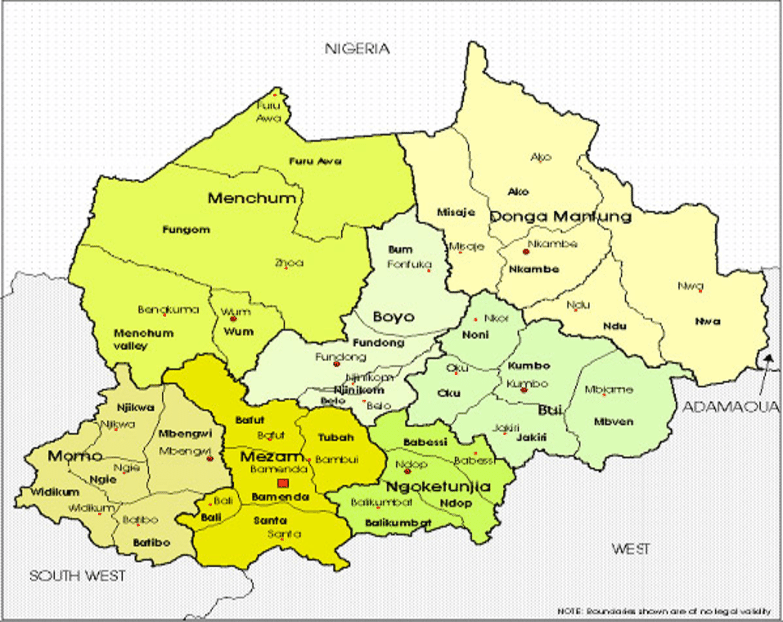
North-West Region

In 1919, the Northwest Region became solely administered by the United Kingdom. In 1961, the region joined the Cameroon. Ambazonian separatists regard both the North-West and South-West regions as being constituent components of their envisaged breakaway state.

== History ==
The origins of the region are linked to the settlement of the Tikar people who joined the Bamoun Kingdom, in the 1700s. In 1884, the region was colonized by Germany under the regime of the protectorate until 1916 when it became a condominium administered jointly by the United Kingdom and the France. In 1919, the administration of the North West region, as part of Southern Cameroons became solely British. In 1961, the region joined Cameroon as part of the federated state of West Cameroon, under the 1961 British Cameroons referendum.

At the end of 2017, an Ambazonian separatist movement in the two English-speaking regions of North West and South West began a wave of violence affecting soldiers, police, business leaders and workers. Separatist activists are trying in particular to prevent children from returning to school. Between 2016 and 2019, separatists reportedly ransacked, destroyed or burned down more than 174 schools.

== Administration ==
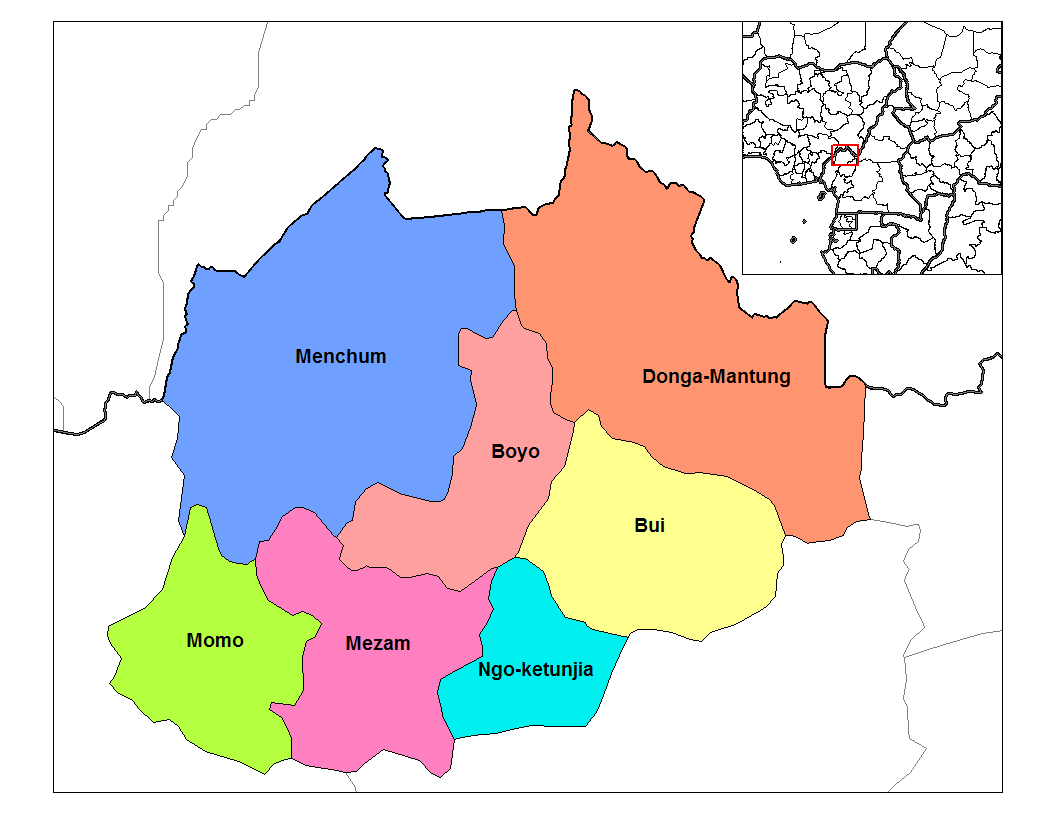
Divisions of Northwest Cameroon

The Northwest Region (known before 2008 as the Northwest Province) is the third most populated province in Cameroon. It has one major metropolitan city, Bamenda, with several other smaller towns such as Wum, Kumbo, Mbengwi, Ndop, Nkambé, Batibo, Bambui, Bafut and Oshie. The province saw an increase in its population from approximately 1.2 million in 1987 to 1.8 million in 2010. The population density of 99.12 people per square kilometer is higher than the national average of 22.6. The provincial urban growth rate is 7.95%, higher than the national average of 5.6%, while the rural growth rate, at 1.16%, is equal to the national rate. In 2001, according to the Statistical Provincial Services of the North-West Province, the population of the province is young, with over 62% of its residents being less than 20 years old. Therefore, the dependency rate in the province is high, particularly in the rural areas.

Like other regions in Cameroon, the Northwest Region is made up of administrative divisions. The province was created in 1972 with five divisions or departments: Bui, Donga-Mantung, Menchum, Mezam, and Momo. Today, it has seven divisions, the additions being Boyo, which was carved out of the Menchum division, and Ngo-Ketunjia or Ngoketunjia, split off from the Mezam division. Each division is further subdivided, with thirty-one total subdivisions in the Northwest Province. The basic unit of local government is the council, and there are thirty-two councils in the region.

=== Politics ===
The Northwest is a stronghold of the Social Democratic Front (SDF) which is one of the main opposition parties of Cameroon. Some Northwesterners feel completely marginalized by the government. There is also a secessionist movement, the SCNC (Southern Cameroons National Council) whose goal is to secede from Cameroon and form a republic consisting of the English-speaking regions. Much of the SCNC's influence exists in the Northwest. In 2008, the President of the Republic of Cameroon, Paul Biya, signed decrees abolishing "provinces" and replacing them with "regions". The Northwest Province subsequently became the Northwest Region.

=== Special status ===
As part of the Major National Dialogue, the region was given a "special status" in December 2019, granting additional rights and responsibilities in relation to economic, health, social, educational, sports and cultural development. Under the special status the region has a bicameral Regional Assembly, made up of a 20-member House of Chiefs composed of traditional leaders and a 70-member House of Divisional Representatives nominated by municipal councils. The Regional Assembly appoints a Regional Executive Council. Additional powers over health and education were also granted to municipalities.

==== Regional Executive Council ====
The Regional Executive Council is led by the president of the Regional Assembly and includes a vice president, three commissioners, two secretaries and a questor.

Name	Portfolios
Fru Fobuzshi Angwafo III	President of the Regional Assembly; President of the House of Divisional Representatives; President of the Regional Executive Council
Fon Yakum Kevin	Vice-president of the Regional Assembly; President of the House of Chiefs; Vice-president of the Regional Executive Council
Awunti Gheunti	Commissioner for Economic Development
Fundufe Lydia	Commissioner for Health and Social Development
Fri Manjo Rose	Commissioner for Education, Sports and Cultural Development
Kalak Mbonteh	Secretary
Fon Bahmbi III Mathias Njuh	Secretary
Jude Waindim	Questor

== Population ==
Historical population
Year	Pop.	±% p.a.
1976	980,531	—
1987	1,237,348	+2.14%
2005	1,728,953	+1.88%
2015	1,968,578	+1.31%

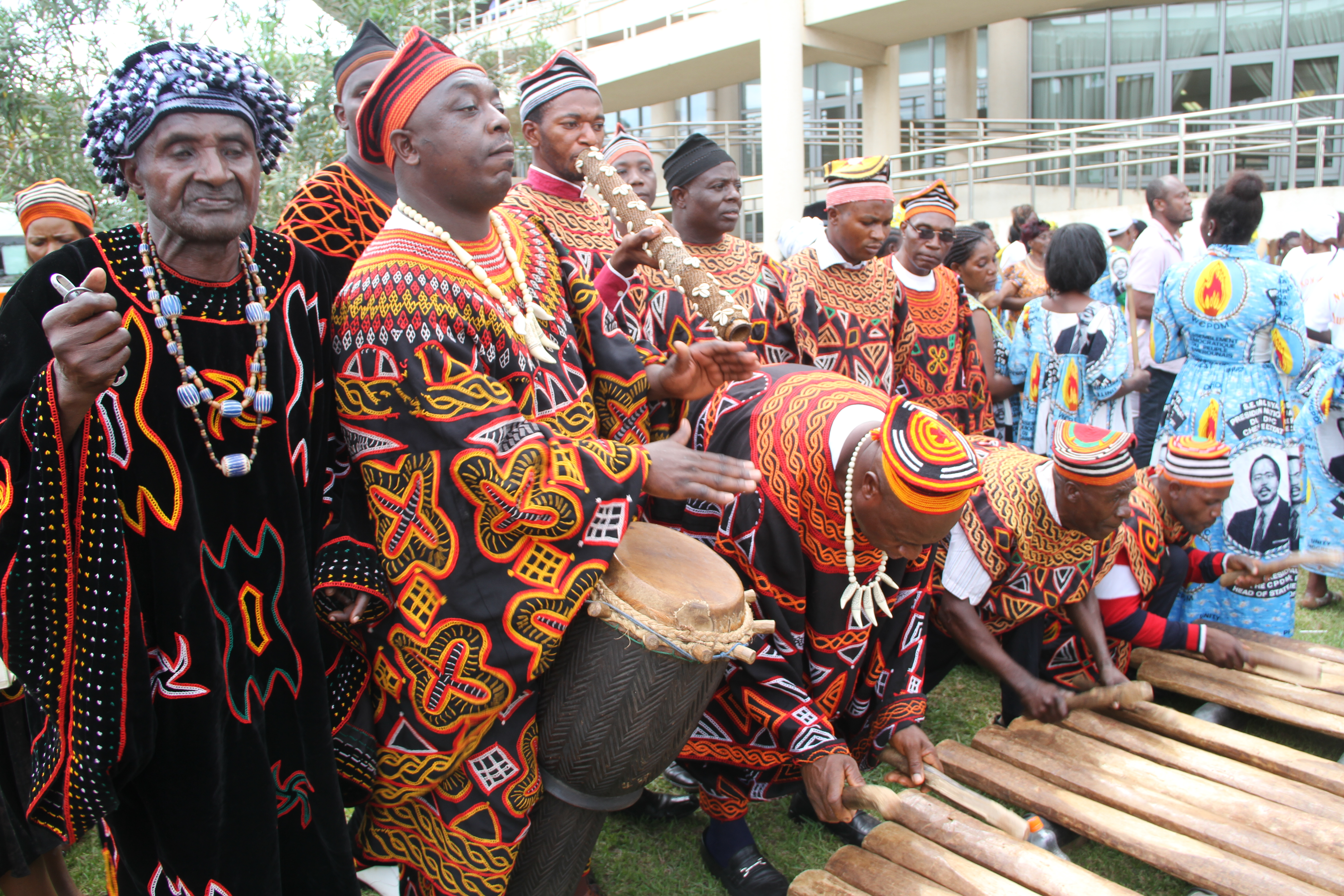
Drums and xylophones are part of the traditional music of the Northwest.

The Northwest Region has many ethnic groups, including immigrants from other regions and countries. Nigeria is well represented, as it borders the region to both the north and the northwest. The native population comprises a variety of ethnic and linguistic groups. The main ethnic groups are of Tikar origin: Tikari, Widikum, Fulani, and Moghamo. The most widely spoken languages in the province include Mungaka, Limbum, Yamba, spoken by the Yamba people also of the Donga Mantung Division; Bafmen, Oku, Lamnso, Ngemba, Pidgin English, Balikumbat, Papiakum, Moghamo, and Nkom. During the colonial period, administrative boundaries were created which cut across ethnic groups and cultures. As a result, parts of some ethnic groups now lie in different divisions and provinces, which is believed to have led to several land conflicts.

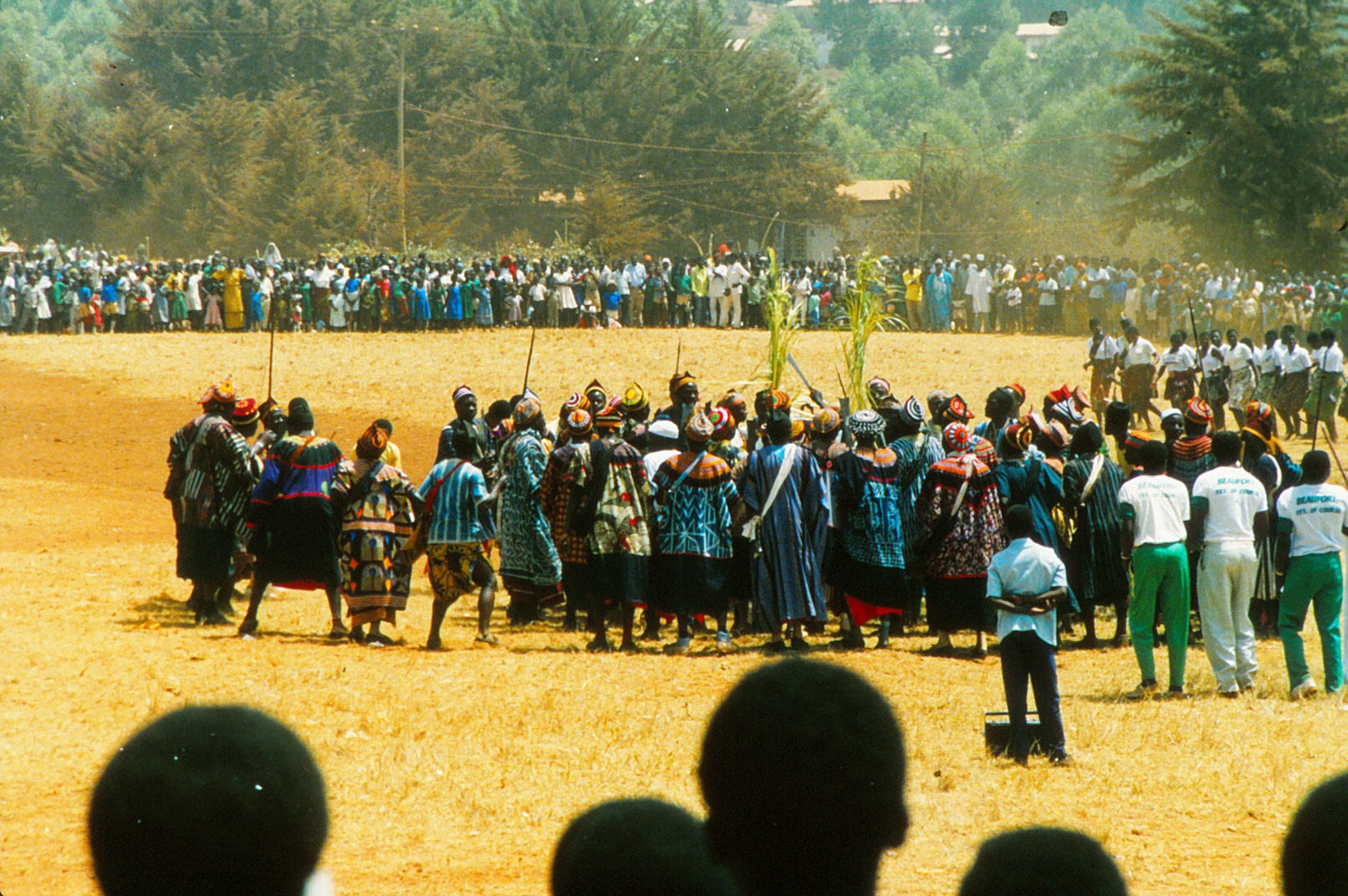
Traditional dance display of Wimbum in Nkambe in dry season

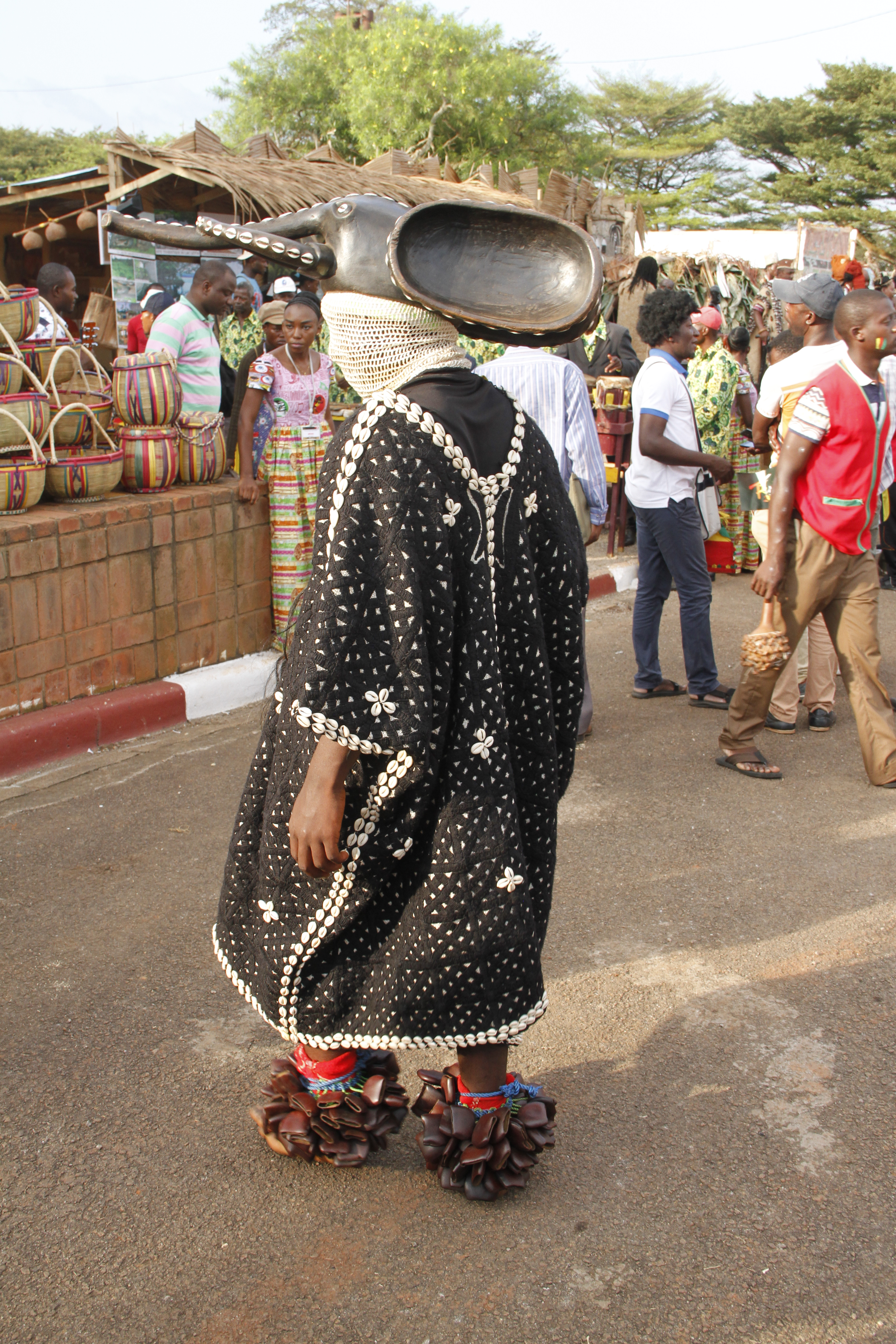
Commercialized version of an elephant juju traditional to Oku. Jujus (masker societies) are a survivor of the traditional culture, still appearing for death ceremonies.

In the provinces, the social organization recognizes a chief as its head, also called the Fon. The Fons, who in their tribal area may be more influential than the official administrative authorities, are considered the living representative of the tribal ancestors.

== Natural attractions ==
Rivers of the NW Region

The Northwest region has unique attractions, including the second highest mountain in West Africa, Mount Oku. It is home to birds such as the Bannerman's turaco, which is unique to this region. There are also many crater lakes such as Lake Oku, Lake Awing, and Lake Nyos. The largest remaining mountain forest in the Northwest Region is the Kilum-Ijim Forest. Menchum Falls, and Abbi Falls in the Mbengwi Division, are also located here.

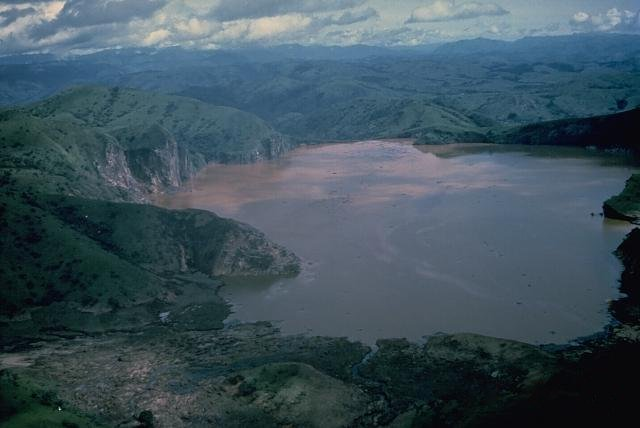
Lake Nyos

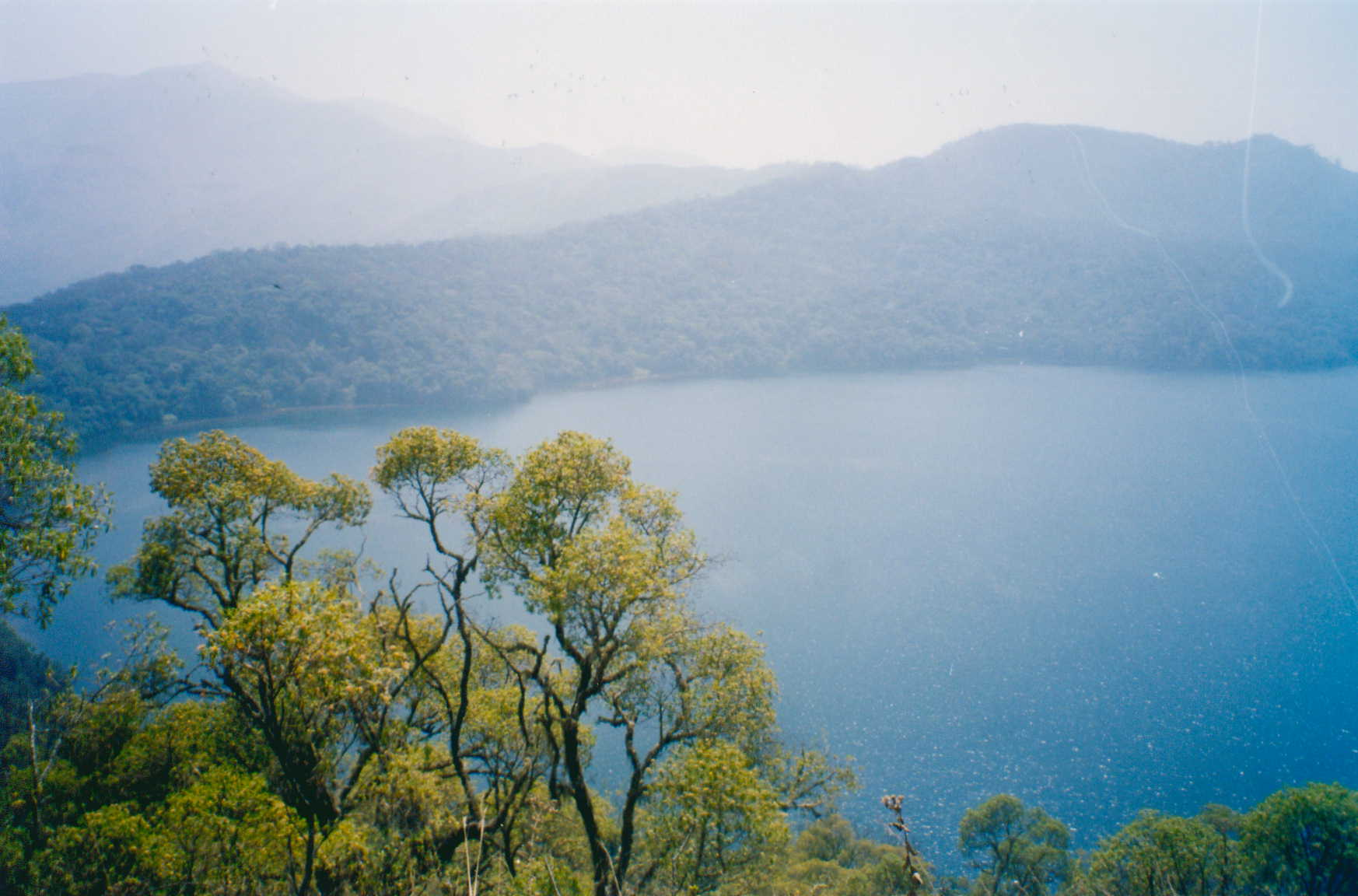
Lake Oku

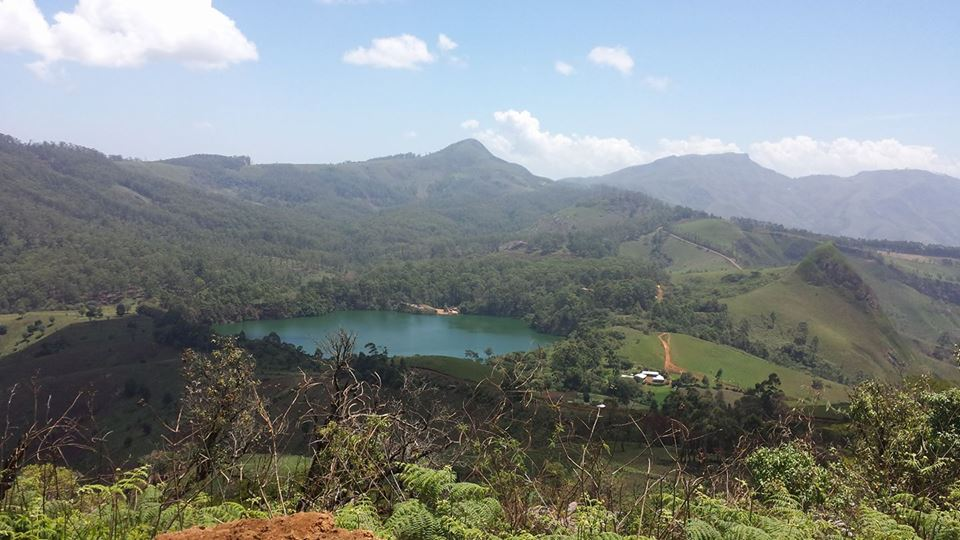
Lake Awing and environment

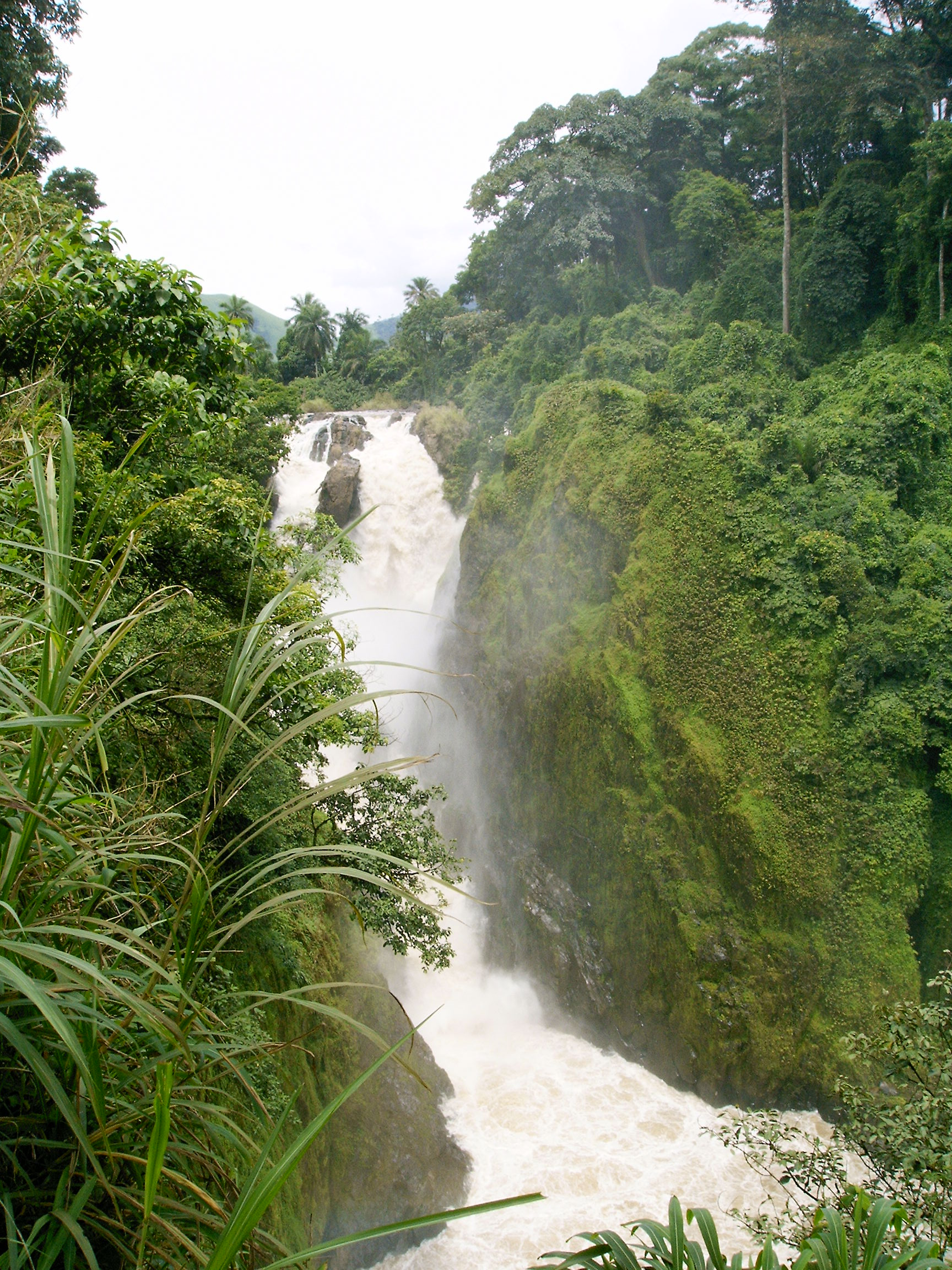
Forest around the Menchum Falls

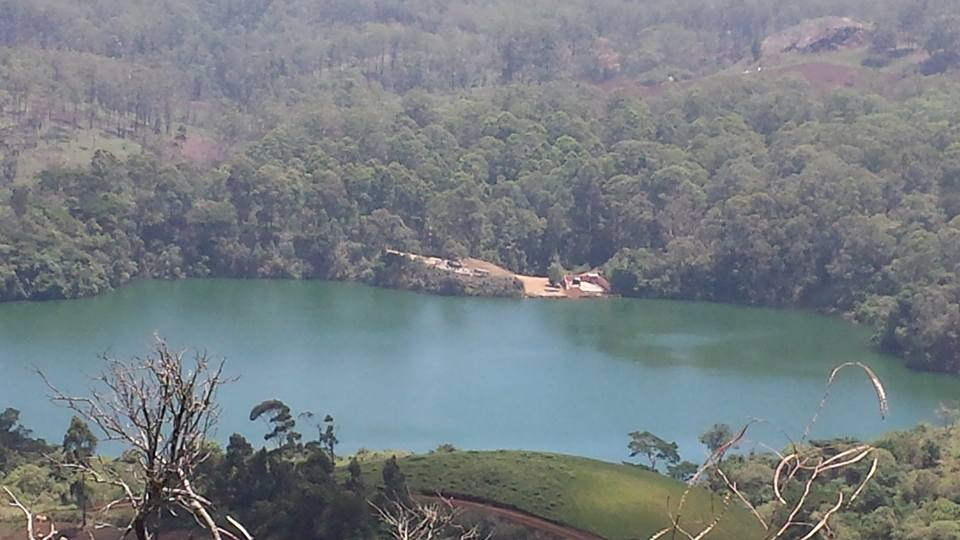
Closer view of lake Awing

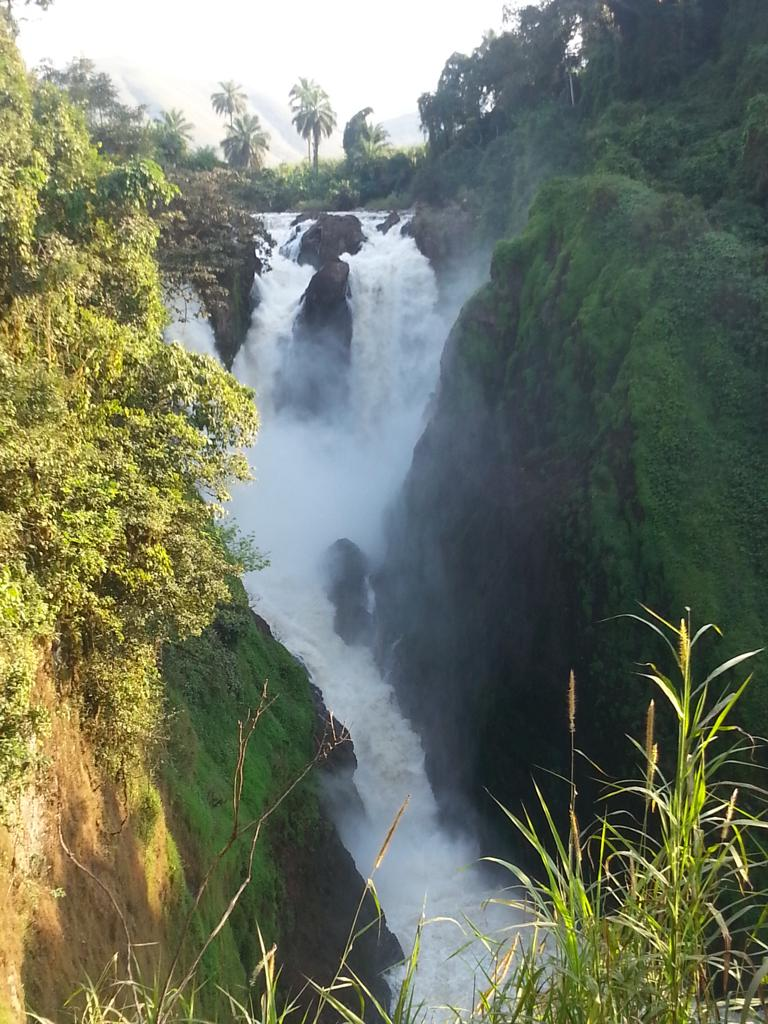
Full extent of Menchum Falls
