= Timeline of the Anglophone Crisis (2018) =

Conflict, started 2017, in Cameroon

This is a timeline of the Anglophone Crisis in Cameroon during 2018.

The Anglophone Crisis is an ongoing armed conflict in the Republic of Cameroon in Central Africa, where historically English-speaking Ambazonian separatists are seeking the independence of the former British trust territory of Southern Cameroons, which was unified with Cameroon since 1961.

== January ==
- On 5 January, members of the Ambazonia Interim Government were detained in Nigeria by unknown parties. Voice of America reported that President Sisiku Julius Ayuk Tabe and six others were taken into custody at a hotel in Abuja. Later reports claimed that the separatist leaders had been extradited to Cameroon. These reports were later claimed to be false, as Nigeria released some leaders in February. However, in April the Cameroonian government revealed that the separatist leaders were indeed extradited on 26 January. Among the total of 47 individuals, most had submitted claims for political asylum. In Kombone, Meme Division, separatists attacked government soldiers.
- On 12 January, two gendarmes were killed in Kombone.
- On 14 January, separatists abducted two soldiers in Kombone, Meme Division, and allegedly killed and beheaded one of them. The Cameroonian Army attacked the village of Kwakwa and burned houses.
- On 18 January, soldiers killed at least seven civilians and burned down hundreds of houses in Kwakwa.
- On 25 January, separatists attacked a Cameroonian border crossing from the Nigerian side of Cross River. In Ekok, Manyu Division, the ADF destroyed a customs office and a gendarme post. Two government soldiers were injured in the attack.
- On 29 January, the Tigers of Ambazonia took several senior administrators hostage in Bangem.
- On 30 January, a gunman attacked a teacher at the Government Primary School in Ntungfe, accusing him of not observing the separatist-imposed school boycott. Another teacher was attacked at the Baptist Comprehensive High School in Njinikejem, this time by a man armed with a knife.
- On 31 January, Nigeria claimed that 80 Cameroonian gendarmes had crossed into Nigeria to pursue separatist fighters, after separatists had escaped across the border.

== February ==
- On 1 February, separatists killed three Cameroonian gendarmes in towns in the Northwest Region.
- On 2 February, soldiers stopped several vehicles in Belo and beat the passengers. One man died during the beating, and another four died after being arrested.
- On 4 February, it was announced that Dr. Samuel Ikome Sako would become the Acting President of the Federal Republic of Ambazonia, succeeding Tabe for the time being.
- On 11 February, three Cameroonian soldiers were killed and four wounded in the town of Kembong, hours after President Biya described the situation in Southern Cameroons as "stable".
- On 12 February, a local chief in Mundemba was shot and killed by separatists. The separatists claimed he had assisted the army in rounding up separatists.
- On 14 February, separatists announced via social media announced they had captured a Cameroonian officer. The Cameroonian military confirmed a top official had gone missing.
- On 19 February, a student gendarme was killed in Nguti, along the Kumba-Mamfe road.
- On 20 February, two separatist fighters were killed by Cameroonian soldiers in Mundemba.
- On 21 February, a teacher was killed by suspected separatists in Tombel, Southwest Region.
- On 24 February, separatists abducted the government's regional representative for social affairs in the Northwest Region, the second such abduction in two weeks. The ADF announced its willingness to exchange the kidnapped officials for imprisoned separatist activists. In Nguti, Kumba, 25 gunmen burned down the residence of an interim chief, accusing him of collaborating with the Cameroonian Army. They also beat seven elders in a vain attempt to locate the chief. In Njinikom, clashes that lasted for two days left at least three people dead, including one civilian and two separatist fighters.
- At some point in February, at least one soldier was killed in a separatist attack in Kombone. Security forces retaliated by setting fire to two houses and killing six civilians in the village.

== March ==
- On 3 March, the Battle of Batibo took place. It was largest clash yet between security forces and separatists. According to reports, separatists attacked Cameroonian soldiers who were celebrating having recently recaptured most villages in the Batibo Subdivision. While the number of casualties remained unclear, information that circulated on social media claimed that 70 security forces and hundreds of separatists were killed in the battle. Over 4,000 locals fled after the confrontation.
- On 7 March, a clash in Mundemba, Ndian Division left one Cameroonian soldier and about a dozen separatist fighters dead. Another two separatists were arrested.
- On 11 March, Ambazonian forces released a video of an abducted government official.
- On 13 March, heavy fighting took place in the village of Nguti, forcing civilians to hide in the forests.
- On 19 March, security forces rescued a professor who had been captured two days prior by men claiming to be the ADF.
- On 20 March, Cameroonian troops freed two Cameroonian and one Tunisian hostages in Meme Department. The hostages had been taken five days prior, and another Tunisian hostage had already been killed by his captors.
- On 30 March, a soldier was killed in Konye, Meme Department, and another soldier was killed in Daadi.

== April ==
- On 4 April, Cameroon freed seven Swiss, six Cameroonian and five Italian hostages in the Anglophone area. While Cameroon claimed "seccessionist terrorists" were behind the hostage taking, the ADF denied any responsibility, claiming that "ADF does not take hostages. ADF arrest enablers and collaborators and does not arrest foreign nationals".
- On 7 April, two soldiers were killed and several others were wounded at the Aziz security post, Southwest Region.
- On 11 April, according to the newspaper The Voice, Cameroonian soldiers killed 18 civilians and destroyed their property, in retaliation of the killing of a commissioner. The Cameroonian Army denied the incident. In another incident, separatists attacked a military convoy in Ekondo-Titi, Ndian Department, wounding three soldiers. According to the Cameroonian military, the separatists were eventually neutralized, and the convoy reached its destination.
- On 12 April, a Cameroonian soldier was shot dead while clearing a road block mounted by separatists.
- On 13 April, gunfights took place near the villages Ediki and Bombe Bakundu, Moungo Division, causing hundreds of civilians to flee to Mbanga.
- On 18 April, three Cameroonian soldiers were killed in an attack in Eyumodjock.
- On 20 April, two Cameroonian soldiers were killed and another four were injured by a landmine in the town of Eyumedjock, near the border with Nigeria.
- On 23 April, in a possible attempt to assassinate the governor of the Southwest Region, separatists fired at his convoy. No casualties were reported.
- On 25 April, following a battle, separatists forced the Cameroonian Army to retreat from the town of Belo. In Kossala, Meme Division, an employee at the Bilingual High School was killed by gunmen.
- On 28 April, two Cameroonian gendarmes were killed in the Northwest Region. According to local reports, some gendarmes were also taken prisoner. In Southwest Region, the Cameroonian Army moved into Munyenge, Bafia and Ikata, triggering thousands to flee into the wilderness. According to an anonymous social worker, several buildings were burned down as the soldiers searched for separatists, including the palaces of local chiefs.
- On 30 April, a teacher was killed in Muyuka.

== May ==
- On 2 May, three Cameroonian soldiers were killed in an attack on a military base in the town of Mbonge, Southwest Region.
- On 6 May, there was heavy fighting in Muyuka.
- On 8 May, unidentified men attacked the Government High School in Bafut, Mezam Department.
- On 10 May, separatists attacked a police station in Muyuka and freed at least four detainees. No casualties were reported.
- On 12 May, gendarmes were videotaped beating a handcuffed suspected separatist leader.
- On 15 May, Mankon was attacked by the Rapid Intervention Battalion and the Air Force. At least one civilian was killed and several buildings were destroyed.
- On 16 May, a policeman was killed by separatists in Oshie, Momo Division.
- On 20 May, in an effort to boycott celebrations of Cameroon's National Day, Ambazonian forces struck in several villages throughout Southern Cameroons, including Konye, Batibo and Ekona. Four police officers and three militants were killed in fighting at Batibo. The mayor of the town of Bangem was kidnapped for distributing uniforms to people to march in National Day ceremonies.
- On 25 May, Cameroonian soldiers attacked a motel in Menka, killing 27 gunmen who had taken 15 hostages, five of whom died during the gunfight. While the Cameroonian Army claimed the gunmen were separatists, villagers claimed they were criminals.
- At an unspecified point in May, the Cameroonian Army retook Belo from the separatists. Fighting continued around the town, while nearly all the villagers fled.

== June ==
- On 5 June, separatists abducted a policeman. Two days later, they released a video of him saying he had been treated well, while claiming that government forces had committed atrocities.
- On 11 June, a Cameroonian soldier was killed in an ambush in the town of Furu-Awa in the Menchum Department.
- On 16 June, a police officer was killed while on patrol in Fundong, Boyo Division. The same day, Ambazonian started a blockade of the Kumba-Buea highway at Ekona, a town located approximately 10 kilometers from Buea. A military assault on the separatists in Ekona failed to lift the blockade. While casualties related to the battle of Ekona remain unconfirmed, the Cameroonian government later declared that more than 40 soldiers and policemen died in the later half of June (however, this figure includes all of Southern Cameroons, not just Ekona).
- On 21 June, separatists attacked a police patrol team in Mbengwi, Momo Department. In Mutengene, Tiko, suspected ADF fighters attacked a police checkpoint, killing one gendarme officer and mutilating another.
- On 22 June, a policemen and two civilians were killed in armed clashes in Bamenda. In Mutengene, armed men attacked a gendarmerie control post and killed one gendarme officer. Another was badly wounded.
- On 26 June, separatists killed two police officers they had abducted.
- On 29 June, separatists mounted roadblocks in the Mile 16 neighborhood in Buea, Southwest Region. The Cameroonian Army responded forcefully, and civilians fled into the bush to avoid getting caught in the crossfire. This happened after several smaller skirmishes in Mile 16 between separatists and the army. In Mbengwi, Momo Department, separatists killed one soldier and wounded another five in an ambush on an army vehicle. The Cameroonian Army claimed that six separatists were killed when reinforcements arrived to evacuate the wounded soldiers.
- At some point in June, two teenage girls were tortured by soldiers who accused them of being spies.

== July ==
- On 1 July, separatists invaded the Muea neighborhood of Buea. The separatists battled intervening government troops, set up roadblocks and unsuccessfully tried to burn down a police station. In Mbengwi, a Cameroonian soldier was killed in an ambush. In Penda Mboko Littoral Region, Southwest Region, separatists stormed a gendarmerie post, catching the few gendarmes present off-guard. After hours of shootouts, the attackers overwhelmed the defenders, burned down the post and escaped before Cameroonian reinforcements could arrive.
- On 7 July, a gendarme officer was killed along the Bamenda-Ndop road.
- On 9 July, separatists invaded several parts of Buea, including the neighborhoods of Bonduma, Malingo and Molyko, and clashed with the army and the police. Another battle took place in Kumba. In total, more than 10 civilians and an unknown number of soldiers died in the clashes.
- On 11 July, a student at Bamenda University was shot dead by the Cameroonian military. In Batibo, BIR soldiers killed 16 civilians.
- On 12 July, separatists carried out an unsuccessful assassination attempt on Defense Minister Joseph Beti Assomo, who was visiting the Anglophone region with a delegation. In the evening, his convoy was ambushed by separatists using guns and poisoned spears. The Cameroonian Army claimed to have killed 10 separatists in the ensuing 30-minute battle. Four soldiers and a journalist were injured, but the Defense Minister escaped unharmed. The separatists had previously warned Assomo from visiting Ambazonia.
- On 13 July, separatists invaded the Mile 4 neighborhood of Limbe, Southwest Region. The clashes continued for two days, until the Cameroonian Army managed to repel the separatists.
- On 17 July, separatists invaded Bamenda to enforce a "ghost town", and a Cameroonian counterattack left a separatist and a Cameroonian soldier dead.
- On 18 July, a policeman was killed and decapitated by separatists in Wum, Northwest Region.
- On 23 July, a young mother was sexually assaulted by a soldier in Bamenda.
- On 27 July, the traditional ruler of the village of Lysoka Moliwe in Buea died while in separatist captivity.
- On 28 July, separatists carried out the Ndop prison break, freeing 163 inmates and burning down the prison.
- On 30 July, clashes between security forces and alleged separatists took place in the Bonduma gate neighborhood of Buea. Security forces killed four civilians after allegedly mistaking them for being separatists. Clashes were also reported in Tiko, Fako Division.
- On 31 July, separatist fighters attacked a checkpoint in Wum, injuring three security officers, seizing weapons and setting fire to a gendarmerie vehicle.

== August ==
- On 4 August, a police officer was killed in his home in Mutengene, close to Tiko, Southwest Region.
- On 5 August, four gendarmes were killed in Eso, a village near Wum, Northwest Region.
- On 15 August, Cameroonian troops raided a separatist camp at Tabli, Lebialem Department, killing five and injuring three separatists, as well as freeing one hostage. Later the same day, separatists attacked soldiers leading a convoy of trucks out of Muea neighborhood of Buea.
- On 16 August, separatists attacked a convoy transporting a member of parliament in Babungo, Ngo-Ketunjia Department. At least four soldiers were killed, and several others in the convoy were injured. A civilian who got caught in the crossfire also got killed.
- On 22 August, there was an arson attack against a road construction company in Bamenda.
- On 24 August, separatists attacked a gendarme brigade in Zhoa in Wum, Northwest Region, killing two gendarmes and wounding the brigade commander. According to initial reports, separatists had blocked the road in advance, and reinforcements from the larger Wum brigade thus failed to arrive in time. A spokesperson of the Cameroonian Army later claimed that 12 separatists had been killed and several others had been wounded, and said that the army had launched an operation to root out separatists in the area.
- On 27 August, as a response to the separatist attack from there, the Cameroonian Army burned down Zhoa.
- On 28 August, separatists killed a retired gendarme officer in Batibo, after accusing him of lending his car to soldiers.
- On 29 August, separatists kidnapped the Fon of Oku, allegedly for assisting the Cameroonian Army against the separatists.

== September ==
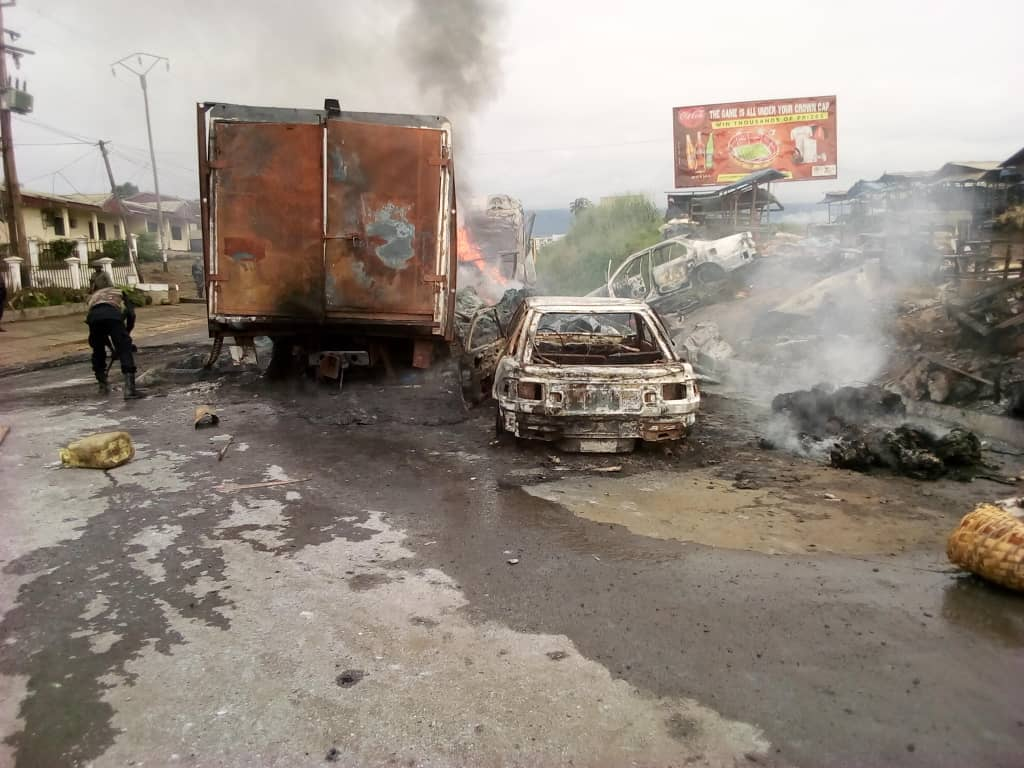
Scorched vehicles left behind after clashes in Buea on 11 September.

- On 1 September, it was reported that the Tole neighborhood of Buea had been completely deserted following clashes between separatists and security forces. At least two civilians were killed in the course of the fighting, and the palace of the traditional ruler was burned down. There were also several armed clashes throughout Bali, Northwest Region. In one of the clashes, the residence of the Secretary of State for Penitentiary Administration was burnt down, while in another clash separatists attacked gendarmes in Ntafong, a neighborhood of Bali.
- Between 1 and 2 September, at least five people were killed in Ndop, reportedly for campaigning for the ruling Cameroon People's Democratic Movement ahead of the Presidential elections. Two sons of a former Divisional Officer of Ndop were also kidnapped, a principal and six students were abducted by unknown armed men, and a head teacher was attacked.
- On 2 September, four separatists were killed and one captured in Muyuka during a Cameroonian offensive in the area. Three Cameroonian soldiers were also wounded in the battle.
- On 4 September, separatists invaded Bamenda to attack the convoy of the Minister of Basic Education. The first shootings took place in the Mile 2 neighborhood, where two gendarmes were wounded. The separatists then attacked soldiers on Foncha street, starting a gunfight that lasted for hours. The incidents paralyzed the city, with businesses closing as employees went home. Civilian casualties were reported, though the number was hard to determine. The same day, the Fon of Bafut was abducted from his palace by gunmen who accused him of aiding the Cameroonian Army; his captors released him hours later. In Ndop, the Cameroonian Army destroyed three separatist camps and claimed to have killed about a dozen separatist fighters, including an ex-gendarme officer who had joined the separatists. The Cameroonian Army suffered two wounded.
- At night on 4 September breaking 5 September, a Cameroonian Army operation killed 27 suspected separatists fighters in Yemngeh near Zhoa in Wum, Northwest Region.
- On 5 September, a truck transporting government soldiers was attacked en route Oku, leading it to lose control and tumble over. Five soldiers died and another 10 were wounded. The Cameroonian Army claimed that two separatists were also killed in the incident.
- On 7 September, four civilians were killed by Cameroonian soldiers in Ekona.
- On 8 September, at least two people were killed in Bamenda when separatist elements attacked a construction site and a bus.
- On 9 September 50 or more separatists carried out three simultaneous attacks in Oku; on the gendarmerie brigade, a police station, and the home of the Assistant Divisional Officer. The separatists burned down the police station, destroyed Assistant DO's belongings, stole a police van and abducted three police officers.
- On 11 September, separatists took control of the Muea and Mile 16 neighborhoods of Buea in the early morning, blocking the main entrances to the city. One soldier was later found dead.
- On 12 September, at least 15 separatists were killed when the Cameroonian Army raided one of their camps near Chomba. The same day, armed men attempted and failed to abduct the Fon of Buea.
- On 13 September, separatists attacked a gendarmerie brigade in Nkwen, near Bamenda. The Cameroonian Army claimed to have killed six separatists while repulsing the attack.
- On 15 September, the road between Wum and Bamenda was reopened after a two-week blockade. In Bali, a teacher at the Cameroon Protestant College was killed by soldiers.
- On 17 September, there was heavy fighting in Oku. In Njikwa, the Cameroonian Army destroyed a separatist camp in a raid in which they claimed 30 separatists were killed. In Buea, separatists attacked the St. Joseph's College Sasse.
- On 20 September, a four-day battle broke out in Bafut, with a battle on 23 September lasting an entire day. According to local sources, the separatists suffered two killed and five wounded, and the army lost over a dozen soldiers.
- On 21 September, an Ambazonian commander was killed in a Cameroonian raid on a separatist base in Kumba.
- On 22 September, seven young men were killed in Mbiame. While the Cameroonian Army claimed they were separatists, locals disputed this. At least one of them was captured alive and summarily executed.
- On 23 September, separatists attacked a gendarmerie post in Limbe, injuring a student gendarme and seizing weapons.
- On 24 September, Cameroonian soldiers killed two civilians in Buea while patrolling during a "ghost town".
- On 25 September, the Tigers of Ambazonia carried out the Wum prison break, enabling over 100 inmates to escape.
- On 26 September, at least three separatists were killed during clashes with security forces in Bamenda. In Limbe, two police inspectors were killed by separatists who made an unsuccessful attempt to burn down the police station there. In Buea, security forces killed at least seven civilians, six of whom were rounded up and summarily executed.
- On 27 September, separatists forced the police and gendarmes to retreat from Balikumbat, Ngo-Ketunjia. The Ambazonian flag was then hoisted over the abandoned police buildings and the divisional office.
- On 28 September, the Cameroonian Army raided a separatist camp near Ndop, destroying the camp and killing six separatist fighters.
- On 29 September, a Cameroonian Army officer was beheaded in Tatum. In ensuing clashes, four separatists were killed.
- On 30 September, in anticipation of the first anniversary of Ambazonia's declaration of independence on 1 October, the authorities imposed a 48-hour curfew throughout the Anglophone region. This was done to prevent a reoccurrence of the mass demonstrations that took place the year before. People were forbidden from moving across sub-division boundaries, and gathering of four or more people in public was prohibited. Businesses were shut down and motor parks were closed as well. Meanwhile, in anticipation of the Cameroonian presidential election on 7 October, the separatists started enforcing a lockdown of their own. To this end, they blocked major highways with trees or car wrecks. Throughout the day, security forces and separatists clashed in Buea, Bamenda and other cities.

== October ==
- On 1 October, the separatists celebrated the first anniversary of the Ambazonian declaration of independence. Flags were hoisted in Boyo, Bafut, Batibo, Ndu and other locations, while there were armed clashes in Tatum, Kumbo and other places.
- On 5 October, three separatists were killed in clashes in Small Soppo, a neighborhood of Buea. Cameroonian forces also attacked a separatist camp in Lysoka, a town close to Buea. In Bamenda, a priest was killed by a government soldier.
- On 6 October, gunmen stormed the Kumba High Court and burned down the building.
- On 7 October, the day of the Cameroonian presidential election, there were clashes all over Southern Cameroons, as separatists moved to prevent what they considered a foreign election to take place in Ambazonia. This resulted in a very low turnout, and in many cases, no officials showed up to man the polling stations. In Bamenda, at least 20 separatist fighters moved around openly to prevent people from voting. Two separatists were killed by government troops while attacking a polling station. Soldiers from the Rapid Intervention Battalion killed two people, one of whom was an elderly disabled man. Following the election, two people from Kumba were murdered for having voted.
- On 9 October, government soldiers killed at least seven people in Ekona, Fako Division.
- On 11 October, Cameroonian troops killed four suspected separatist fighters in Misaje and another seven in Eshobi. Six hostages were also released in Eshobi.
- On 14 October, Cameroonian soldiers rounded up and shot four boys in Mutengene, Fako Division.
- On 17 October, SDF President John Fru Ndi's house in Bamenda was set on fire by armed men. In Muyuka, a teenager was killed by security forces during a clash with armed groups.
- On 18 October, at least one civilian was killed during clashes in the Mile 14 and Mile 15 neighborhoods of Buea. Three soldiers were also wounded.
- On 19 October, the Cameroonian Army announced it had killed 17 suspected separatists in Ndop and five in Bafut over the weekend.
- On 21 October, security forces attacked a separatist camp in Oku. At least eight separatists were killed, while four Cameroonian soldiers were seriously wounded.
- On 23 October, several battles took place all across the Anglophone regions. The Cameroonian Army launched simultaneous attacks on seven or more separatist camps in the Northwest Region. The fighting continued for more than 24 hours, and at least 30 separatists were killed as well as an unknown number of Cameroonian soldiers. One Cameroonian soldier was confirmed killed. The Cameroonian Army also attacked suspected separatists in Bombe Bakundu, Southwest Region.
- On 24 October, Cameroonian forces assaulted two separatist camps in Oku. The separatists had been tipped of the incoming assault, and had evacuated the bases earlier the same day. A single fighter stayed behind and carried out an ambush, injuring six soldiers before he was killed.
- On 28 October, Cameroonian soldiers killed at least five people and set several houses on fire in Nyasoso, Koupé-Manengouba. Government forces had reportedly tried for sometime to break into Nyasoso, but had been held back by separatists.
- On 29 October, heavy fighting broke out in Bambili, Northwest Region, with separatists attacking security forces by the Fon's palace. The fighting continued the next day, when separatists attacked the Bambili gendarmerie brigade. In Penda Mboko, Littoral Region (near the border with the Southwest Region), gunmen attacked and tried to burn down a school, but were repelled by security forces.
- On 30 October, an American missionary was caught in the crossfire and killed in Bambui. Security forces and separatists blamed each other for his death.

== November ==
- On 3 November, separatists chopped the fingers off six plantation workers. Separatists had ordered a strike to protest the reelection of President Biya, and allegedly mutilated the workers as punishment for defying those orders and going to work.
- On 4 November 79 students and four staff members were kidnapped from a school in Nkwen, near Bamenda. The kidnappers transported everyone to Bafut, slipping past several security checkpoints on the way. The purpose of the kidnapping was to tell the students to stop going to school, a message they were tasked to convey to other schools as well. Cameroonian authorities announced the launching of an operation to locate and free the students. All 79 students were released without ransom three days later, with the Cameroonian Army claiming the kidnappers did so because they realized they were surrounded and had no other alternative. On 12 November, the principal and the three staff members were released too. While the kidnappers identified as "Amba Boys" and the government blamed the separatists, the Ambazonia Self-Defence Council claimed that they not only had nothing to do with the kidnappings, but had also sent its own fighters to try to locate the children.
- On 5 November, armed men killed two people in Batibo, both of whom had been suspected of having assisted the security forces.
- On the weekend of 10–11 November, an Ambazonian commander was killed in a shootout in Kumbo.
- On 10 November, a staff member at Buea University was abducted by gunmen.
- On 11 November, according to the separatists, 13 Cameroonian soldiers and two separatists were killed when separatists carried out a successful ambush.
- On 12 November, Cameroonian soldiers ambushed and killed at least 13 suspected separatists in Donga-Mantung. In Buea, separatists ambushed and killed a retired policeman who they suspected was spying for the army. In Esu, Menchum Division, government soldiers burned down dozens of houses and tortured villagers.
- On 13 November 25 separatists were killed near Nkambé, according to Cameroonian security officials. In Mwa, Donga-Mantung, the town's mayor was killed by unidentified gunmen. In Buea, a teacher at a government high school was kidnapped by three armed men, who also beat up another teacher and some students. The teacher was released by his captors on 21 November.
- On 14 November, soldiers attacked the village of Tatum, Nkum, killing one man, injuring another, and burning dozens of houses.
- On 15 November 13 nuns were kidnapped by unidentified gunmen in Bamessing, spending a day in captivity before being released the next day.
- On 16 November, Cameroonian forces ambushed and killed at least ten separatist fighters in Belo, including a general. In Buea, a staff member at Buea University was abducted.
- On 18 November, unidentified gunmen kidnapped a policeman in Kumba, releasing him the day after for a ransom.
- On 19 November, a policeman was kidnapped and beheaded by unidentified gunmen, despite receiving ransom from the family. The policeman had been accused of training Ambazonian fighters, and was on the way to Yaoundé to defend himself when he was kidnapped.
- On 20 November, unidentified gunmen kidnapped nine students and a teacher from Lords Bilingual Secondary school in Kumba. The army went on a search, and was able to locate the kidnappers' camp. At night the camp was raided, resulting in the death of two kidnappers and the capture of one, while three students were rescued. The remaining seven hostages were able to escape on their own, while the army pursued the remaining kidnappers into the bushes. Two more kidnappers, including the leader, were killed the next morning.
- On 21 November, a Kenyan missionary was killed in Kembong, Manyu Division. Bishop Andrew Nkea of the Roman Catholic Diocese of Mamfe said the missionary was shot in front of the church by soldiers who were shooting from a vehicle, citing the accounts of eyewitnesses. The bishop also stated that one more person was shot near the church. A local source stated that there were no armed separatists in Kembong at the time, while government soldiers were present. A Defence Ministry spokesperson denied the claims and blamed separatists. In Belo, the Vice Principal of the Government Bilingual High School was killed in his own home by unidentified gunmen.
- On 22 November, around 40 Ambazonian fighters and unarmed civilians were killed in Bali by government soldiers, who then set their corpses on fire. With no trace of bullet wounds on any of the bodies, unconfirmed reports alleged the use of chemicals by the soldiers.
- On 24 November, a Catholic priest, a deacon and their driver were kidnapped in Munyenge, Muyuka.
- On 26 November, a police officer was killed in an armed clash between separatists and government forces in Ako, Donga-Mantung.
- On 27 November, students and a staff member of the University of Bamenda were kidnapped on matriculation day. Government forces and separatists clashed in Bambili.
- On 28 November, heavy clashes along the Buea-Kumba Highway left traffic paralyzed, with separatists blocking roads, burning vehicles and attacking government soldiers in Ekona and Muyuka. A military convoy arrived on the morning of 29 November to escort travellers to their destinations, while fighting was still going on.
- On 29 November, at least 30 people were kidnapped by ten unidentified gunmen in Bangourain, Noun Division, West Region, close to the border with Northwest Region. The captives were transported with canoes across the Lake Bamendjing reservoir. In Kembong, just south of Mamfe, a military vehicle hit a road bomb; no soldiers died, but the vehicle was destroyed.
- On 30 November, after a day of relative calm along the Buea-Kumba Highway, separatists took control of parts of the road and mounted road blocks.

== December ==
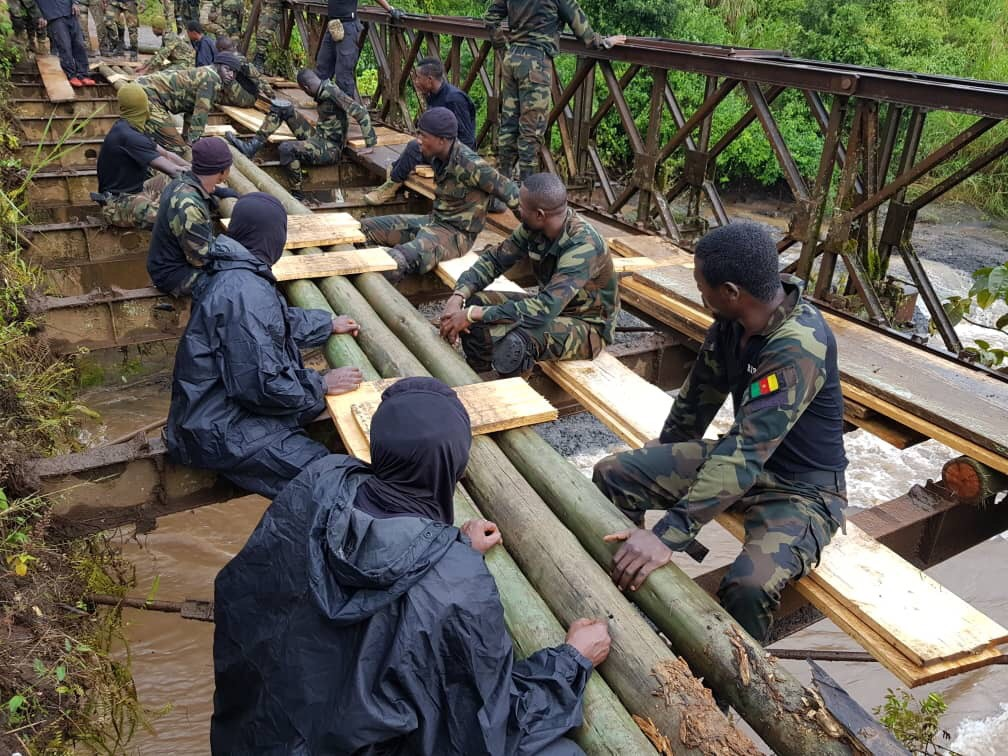
Cameroonian soldiers repairing a bridge while moving towards Wum, 6 December.

- On 1–2 December, heavy clashes took place across Northwest Region, leaving three or more dead in Mankon, Mezam Division.
- On 3 December, separatists attacked Cameroonian soldiers guarding a water tank in Kumbo. The next day, soldiers burned dozens of houses in the locality of Romajia.
- On 5 December, government soldiers killed 7 civilians and burned around 15 houses in Meluf, Kumbo.
- On 6 December, soldiers burned 19 houses in Kikiakom. Unverified reports claimed that two separatists were killed in Mbukui.
- On 8 December 12 or more students of the University of Bamenda were kidnapped on graduation day. The kidnappers released a video saying that all the students would be released, and that the incident should serve as a warning to other students to uphold the school boycott.
- On 10 December, a teacher was killed by unidentified gunmen in Njinikejem, Belo.
- On 11 December, a teenager was killed during a battle between government forces and separatists in Bamenda.
- On 12 December, clashes along the Buea-Kumba Highway left travellers stranded on both sides.
- On 13 December, armed men seized the residence of Gabsa Nyagha Sixtus, a coordinator of the recently formed disarmament committee, in Balikumbat. After sending away all civilians, the armed men set the building on fire. Sixtus had been appointed less than a week prior to the attack.
- Between 14 and 15 December, heavy clashes took place in Bamenda. A battle was fought in the Mankon neighborhood, where government soldiers burned down houses and stores. During the fighting, separatist fighters destroyed several police vans. The military claimed to have killed seven armed separatists in the battles, while itself suffering four seriously wounded. The army commander of the region accused the separatists of hiding among civilians, while locals accused the military of shooting indiscriminately.
- On 15 December, at least five separatists were summarily executed by unknown perpetrators, raising speculations of separatist infighting.
- On 16 December, a policeman was killed by suspected separatists in Ndop.
- On 18 December, at least six students and a teacher were kidnapped from three different schools in Bamenda.
- On 21 December, ADF General Ivo Mbah was killed during a military raid in Kumba.
- On 22 December, a Cameroonian soldier was killed in Mbengwi, Momo Division. In Bangourain, Noun Division (roughly five kilometers outside Southern Cameroons), attackers burned down over 60 houses, killed one person and kidnapped several more. While the government blamed separatists, the separatists claimed the attack was a false flag operation by the government to make Cameroonian Francophones more eager to fight on; the ADF has made a point of not attacking outside the borders of Southern Cameroons. In Ekondo-Titi, a battle between separatists and security forces left two separatists dead.
- On 24 December, clashes took place in Bamali, Buea, Muyuka, Bamenda, Bambalang and Babessi. In Ndu, gendarmes killed an intellectually disabled man.
- On 26 December, two suspected separatists were lynched by villagers in Bangourain.
- On 28 December, government forces launched an attack to destroy a wall between Bangulan and Bangourain, erected and controlled by separatists. In Bamenda, a soldier was decapitated by separatists as the warring parties clashed. In Binka, Nkambé, government soldiers killed at least six separatists and arrested one.
- On 31 December, the presidents of Cameroon and Ambazonia addressed the ongoing conflict in their end of year speeches. President Paul Biya of Cameroon promised to "neutralize" all separatists who refused to disarm, while emphasizing that anyone who drops their guns can be reintegrated into society. President Samuel Ikome Sako of Ambazonia said that the separatists would switch from a defensive to an offensive strategy in the war, and announced that a Mobile Wing Police would be created to capture territory and defeat government militias. He also condemned anyone engaged in kidnappings of civilians, and promised to fight back against anyone involved in such practices. The same night, separatist fighters attacked the convoy of the Governor of the Northwest Region, injuring at least one government soldier. The Cameroonian Army also announced the killing of Lekeaka Oliver, Field Marshall of the Red Dragons militia, in Lebialem; the killing was denied by the Interim Government of Ambazonia, and was also denied by sources within the Cameroonian Army. Oliver resurfaced in a video a week later, proving that reports of his death were false.
