= Timeline of the Anglophone Crisis (2024) =

Conflict, started 2017, in Cameroon

This is a timeline of the Anglophone Crisis in Cameroon during 2024.

The Anglophone Crisis is an ongoing armed conflict in the Republic of Cameroon in Central Africa, where historically English-speaking Ambazonian separatists are seeking the independence of the former British trust territory of Southern Cameroons, which was unified with Cameroon since 1961.

== January ==
- On 1 January, writing from the Kondengui Central Prison, Sisiku Julius Ayuk Tabe (the first president of Ambazonia) called for an end of the Ambazonian leadership crisis and unity among separatist factions.
- On 6 January, footage surfaced in which armed men claiming to be part of the Ambazonia Defence Forces (ADF) were torturing a civilian in Muyuka.
- On 9 January, Cameroonian forces raided a separatist hideout in Ewai. Cameroon claimed that at least five separatists were killed, while the separatists claimed to have suffered three dead. Hundreds of people fled Ewai during the raid.
- On 11 January, a gendarme officer shot a civilian dead in Mamfe.
- On 13 January, separatist fighters shot and tortured a civilian in Menchum, after accusing him of passing information to the Cameroonian military.
- On 21 January, it was confirmed that Cameroonian forces had captured top ADF commander "General Efang".
- On 24 January, suspected separatists burned a road construction equipment in Ndu.
- On 29 January, several people were feared dead and three vehicles were burned in a separatist attack in Buea.

== February ==
- On 6 February, an official was abducted by unidentified kidnappers in Bamenda. He was rescued four hours later by the Cameroonian military. The kidnapping was attributed to the Red Dragon militia.
- On 7 February, four civilians were killed by Cameroonian forces in Kumbo.
- On 11 February, one person was killed and dozens more were injured, including children, in an explosion during Youth Day celebrations in Nkambe.
- On 16–17 February, eight separatists were killed during military operations in the locality of Ayukaba. Two persons were killed during clashes in Banga Bakundu.
- On 21 February, one person was killed during clashes in Banga Bakundu.
- On 26 February, Cameroonian security forces detected and deactivated an improvised explosive device (IED) in Galim, West Region. According to local sources, separatists meant to target the Divisional Officer of Galim.

== March ==
- On 9–11 March, a separatist commander known as Barack was killed by the Rapid Intervention Battalion during clashes near Batibo.
- On 12 March, two civilians were killed in a suspected separatist attack on a Brasseries du Cameroun truck in Bamenda.
- On 22–23 March, a local elected official was shot dead in Babessi, in an attack claimed by separatists.
- On 25 March, the Cameroonian military said it had killed at least seven separatist fighters in Tubah.
- On 27 March, Cameroonian forces carried out a series of raids against separatist hideouts in Big Babanki, Bamenda and Bambui. 13 separatist fighters were reported killed in Bambui, and "several" were killed in Big Babanki. Two separatist fighters were also killed in Jakiri.
- On 31 March, a separatist group called the Ribbons of Ambazonia announced that they had banned farming on Mondays in the Meme and Ndian divisions.

== April ==
- On 4 April, a severed head was discovered at the Azire Old Church Junction in Bamenda. Witnessed said that it was dropped there by separatist fighters.
- On 10 April, a battle took place in Kumbo: At night, a group of rebels stormed Kumbo and attacked the local BIR base, resulting in several deaths. The attack was reportedly carried out by the Bui Unity Warriors. Afterward, Cameroonian forces organized revenge raids in the area, set ablaze houses in three villages of the Bui Division, and killed three civilians and one separatist fighter in Bamfem.
- On 15 April, separatist fighters abducted two teachers in Njap, Donga-Mantung.
- On 24 April, separatist general Desmond Koa (known as "General Mad Dog") was killed along with four of his fighters by the Rapid Intervention Brigade in Mbonge, Ndian.
- On 29 April, three men were reportedly killed and several others injured in an alleged separatist attack in Kumba. A locally made bomb exploded in Nkwen, Bamenda, causing no casualties. The attack was claimed by ADF leader, Ayaba Cho Lucas. Separatist fighters set fire to a bulldozer working on the Tugi-Bamenda road. A commercial motorcycle was also seized and set on fire by the fighters for violating ghost town.

== May ==
- On 1 May, separatist fighters abducted 28 people (including eight children) from the Catholic Church of Bai Panya in Meme. A group calling itself the "Al-Qaeda Squad of Meme", led by "Field Marshall Lucifer", claimed responsibility. The group accused the abducted civilians of attempting to get birth certificates for the upcoming 2025 Cameroonian presidential election, and threatened to summarily execute them.
- On 4 May, former ADF spokesperson and Ambazonia People's Rights Advocacy Group President Capo Daniel called for an end of the armed struggle against Cameroon. The communiqué called for negotiations and a switch to nonviolent resistance, and for fighters to only use their weapons defensively pending an agreement.
- On 5 May, a separatist commander known as General Sagon was killed by Cameroonian forces along with two of his collaborators in Bamunka, Ndop. Three days later, separatists blocked the Bamenda-Ndop road in retaliation.
- On 7 May, the Black Lions of Bamali seized a gendarmerie truck in Ndop. The action was led by "General Kolambo".
- On 8 May, separatist fighters led by "Field Marshall Lucifer" captured and burned down a military post in Bomana, Meme.
- On 10 May, separatists killed six gendarmes in Eyumodjock, including a commander, and seized weapons and uniforms.
- On 12 May, a soldier from the Rapid Intervention Battalion reportedly shot at civilians in a Limbe nightclub, killing one and wounding two, in revenge for the killings of his fellow soldiers in Bamenda by separatist fighters.
- On 14 May, suspected separatist fighters raided a school in Ndu and abducted two teachers. Four people including two government forces and two civilians were killed in a separatist attack in Bambui.
- On 15 May, ADF fighters attacked a school and burned materials.
- On 16 May, a brigade commander and a gendarme were killed in a separatist attack in Akwaya, Manyu.
- On 17 May, four separatist fighters were killed during a government offensive in Mbveh and Ndzenji, Bui.
- On 19 May, clashes between separatist fighters and Cameroonian forces left three people dead, including a separatist, a soldier and a young child in Akum, Mezam.
- On 20 May, during Cameroon's National Day, separatist fighters killed the mayor and two other people in Belo. Another attack took place in Njinkom. Separatist fighters killed a soldier in Mundemba.
- On 24 May, the Nigerian Army arrested eight men in Taraba State, on the border between Nigeria and Cameroon, for smuggling fuel to Ambazonian rebels.
- On 25 May, two people were killed and eleven seriously injured in an attack on a bar in Bamenda.
- On 28 May, a student and a policeman were injured in Bamenda during an attempt by separatists to disrupt the written part of the GCE exam. In Olu, Bui, separatist fighters launched an attack, killing one student and wounding others.
- On 29 May, a former Red Dragon fighter who had switched sides to fight for the government was killed in a suspected planned assassination.

== June ==
- On 1 June, separatist fighters killed an official in a roadside ambush in Donga-Mantung.
- On 5 June, suspected separatist fighters killed a councillor in an ambush in Menchum. Separatists burned a taxi at a former hospital in Bamenda.
- On 8 June, armed men claiming to be ADF fighters set fire to a vehicle in Bamenda.
- On 10 June, suspected separatist fighters killed a bike rider and abducted a passenger in Bamenda.
- On 13 June, separatist commander Besaka Belget (known as "General Black Bat") was killed by Cameroonian forces in Kombone Bakundu, Meme.
- On 16 June, a former separatist fighter was killed by ADF in Bamenda.
- On 17 June, a nurse was killed by ADF fighters in Bafut. At least two people were reportedly injured in a separatist gunfire in Buea. Locals said the attackers identified themselves as the Mountain Lions of Fako.
- On 18 June, the ADF set fire to a cab in Bamenda.
- On 21 June, it was reported that Cameroonian forces had used civilians in Melim to search for IEDs, resulting in the deaths of two civilians.
- On 26 June, three civilians were killed in an IED attack in Oshum, Batibo. ADF claimed responsibility.
- On 30 June, two separatist fighters, including an ADF commander known as "General Stone", were killed during an operation by security forces in Bamenda. Their bodies were subsequently burned.

== July ==
- On 1 July, two soldiers were killed in Munyenge, Muyuka. In Tadu, Bui, a soldier was killed and his weapon seized by separatist fighters.
- On 4 July, separatist fighters killed a man and abducted his son in Ntumbaw, Ndu, Donga-Mantung.
- On 7 July, Cameroonian forces reportedly invaded Bamali, killing two civilians and injuring others.
- On 8 July, a retired soldier and an internally displaced person was killed by suspected separatists in Bamenda.
- On 10 July, two separatist fighters, including a leader known as ''Commander Iron'', were killed during a military operation in Bamenda.
- On 14 July, separatist fighters killed a young man and abducted his brother in Bamenda.
- On 15 July, suspected separatists set fire to the palace of Chief Ewome John Eko in Bwassa, Southwest Region, resulting in the destruction of one section of the complex. The attackers left a note with a warning for collaborators, along with an Ambazonian flag. Separatists burned three bikes in Ngie, Momo.
- On 19 July, at least four armed separatists, including a deputy commander, were killed in a military offensive in Alabukam, Bamenda.
- On 21 July, the ADF attacked the office of the Divisional Officer in Jakiri, Bui.
- On 23 July, a single mother was killed by suspected separatist fighters in Bamenda. Separatist fighters attacked Mbessa, Boyo, killing one villager, kidnapping and wounding others.
- On 28 July, separatist fighters shot and wounded the deputy mayor of Oku.
- On 30 July, Fulani militants attacked the village of Sop in Ndu, burning several homes and killing at least one person.

== August ==
- On 7 August, two police officers were killed and their weapon seized by separatist fighters in Bamenda. The ADF claimed responsibility. It was reported that Fulani militiamen invaded once again the village of Sop in Ndu setting fire to houses, looting stores and attacking villagers, leaving many wounded.
- On 9 August, two police officers were killed in a bomb explosion in Bamenda.
- On 10 August, following the deaths of two separatist fighters in Bangulan, Ngo-Ketunjia, separatist commander "General No Mercy" declared an indefinite lockdown in the village.
- On 14 August, five cabs were set on fire by unidentified gunmen in Bamenda.
- On 16 August, separatist fighters imposed a blockade on the Kumba-Mamfe road. In Bui, a police inspector was killed in a separatist ambush.
- On 19 August, it was reported that Cameroonian forces carried out a combined ambush and targeting operation between Ndop and Bamessing, Ngo Kentunjia. During this operation, two key members of the "Only Bro" group were neutralized.
- On 20 August, separatist commander Tantoh Leonard (known as "General Colabo") was killed by his own fighters in Ndop, following a dispute over the distribution of ransom money.
- On 21 August, in a video, the separatist group Mountain Lions declared a two-week lockdown starting on 9 September in order to disrupt school resumption.
- On 23 August, suspected separatists burned a taxi in Bamenda.
- On 24 August, at least three police officers were killed in Buea. The Mountain Lions claimed responsibility for the attack.
- On 25 August, a driver for a health NGO was kidnapped and killed by gunmen in Bamenda.
- On 27 August, a soldier was killed in an alleged separatist attack near Bamenda.

== September ==
- On 2 September, separatist fighters killed a biker and burnt down a taxi in Buea. In Mbatu, near Bamenda, three people were killed by armed separatists.
- On 8 September, a former separatist fighter was killed in an alleged targeted attack in Bamenda. In Sop, Bui, three separatist fighters were killed in a confrontation with the Cameroonian army.
- On 16 September, two separatist fighters were killed during an operation by the Rapid Intervention Battalion (BIR) in Worsing, Bali Nyonga. In a separate incident, another separatist fighter was killed in a BIR attack between Sabga, Kedjon Ketinguh and Bamessing. A civilian was also killed in the clashes.
- On 19 September, a suspected separatist IED detonated and numerous gunshots erupted in Bamenda.
- On 24 September, AGovC leader Ayaba Cho Lucas was arrested in Norway and charged with inciting crimes against humanity. AGovC vice president Julius Nyih took over as interim leader of the organization, in accordance with a contingency succession plan.

== October ==
- On 1 October, separatists across the Anglophone regions celebrated Ambazonia's independence day with parades and meetings. In many of the major cities, the streets were deserted due to separatist-imposed ghost towns. Separatists held large parades in rural areas. A group known as the Ambazonia State Army, led by "General Talk and Do", held a military parade in Kikaikom. ADF commander "General Sumanguru" organized a similar parade in Momo department.
- On 8 October, Cameroonian forces raided a separatist stronghold in the village of Effa in Momo. A separatist commander known as "General Popo" was killed.
- On 9 October, two Cameroonian soldiers were killed in a separatist ambush in Mbingo, Boyo department. A separatist group known as the "Pythons of Boyo," led by "General Nyih", claimed responsibility.
- On 12 October, seven separatist fighters from Widikum surrendered and joined the Disarmament, Demobilization and Reintegration Centre in Bamenda.
- On 16 October, separatists executed two alleged gang members in Bali Nyonga, after a mob had seized them and handed them over to the separatists.
- On 18 October, six suspected Ambazonian separatists were arrested by Nigerian police in Akamkpa, Cross River State.
- On 24 October, the 6th Regional Rapid Intervention Battalion carried out the Bombanda raid in Meme, killing nine separatist commanders including "Field Marshall Lucifer" (alias "General Lucifer", birth name Ndiba Lenya Clifford).
- On 26 October, following a public screening of a documentary on President Paul Biya organized by the ruling party, two residents were shot dead and a municipal official was abducted and murdered by unidentified gunmen in Bamenda II. Gunmen also attacked the Government Bilingual High School in Bamenda; one student was injured in the attack. No separatist group claimed responsibility.
- On 29 October, three suspected separatists were arrested by Cameroonian forces in a military operation in Kedjom Ketinguh, Ngo-Ketunjia.

== November ==
- On 2 November, the Rapid Intervention Battalion (BIR) opened two new bases in Nguti and Alou, with the aim of combating ghost towns and increasing security along the Kumba-Mamfe road.
- On 4 November, a young man was killed in Mulang, Bamenda. Locals claimed that he was killed by soldiers.
- On 11 November, Cameroonian soldiers tortured a group of civilians in Ngoketunjia for several hours, killed one of them, and looted his possessions.
- On 14 November, separatist fighters abducted Langsi Abel, a former mayor of Bafut. He was released after eight days.
- On 15 November, armed men burned a man to death on Ayaba Street in Bamenda using tyres.
- On 17 November,A group of boys under the age of 22 were arrested in buea in front of Congelcam following the massive raids in Buea that period and also separatist fighters attacked a vehicle on the Ndu-Foumban road, killing two civilians and a soldier. One more civilian was injured. The Ambazonia State Army claimed responsibility.
- On 24 November, Cameroonian forces ambushed and killed at least five ADF fighters in Nchulam, Bamenda, including a commander known as "General Weapon" and his deputy, "Colonel Mami".
- On 29 November, a police officer was killed and another was injured by separatist fighters in Bamenda.

== December ==
- On 6–7 December, an explosion and gunshots were heard in Bamenda, as separatists moved to enforce a lockdown. At least one person was killed.
- On 11 December, Fon Richard Muntong III of Bamessing issued an ultimatum where he demanded that all separatist fighters leave his village by 31 December.
- On 13 December, two police officers were seriously injured in a clash with separatist fighters in Bamenda. The ADF claimed responsibility for the attack.
- On 14 December, separatists imposed a lockdown in Bamenda to mourn one of their members killed a few weeks earlier by security forces.
- On 18 December, the Nigerian Army arrested four suspected Ambazonian separatists in Takum, Taraba State, Nigeria. The four confessed to being involved with weapons smuggling.
- On 23 December, Cameroonian soldiers arrested three people in Bamenda. According to local sources, one of them was killed while attempting to escape.
- On 27 December, separatist fighters reportedly stabbed to death a man known as “Cho Pinyin” in Menka, Pinyin.
- On 29 December, a magistrate was kidnapped by unidentified gunmen from his home in Bamenda. Many other civilians were abducted the same day by suspected separatists in the town.
- On 30 December, a separatist fighter known as "Mission Commander" was reportedly killed by military forces in Rom, Nwa. In Makobe, Southwest Region, soldiers of the 21st Battalion killed a separatist fighter known as "Colonel Toless".
