= Bambalang (village) =

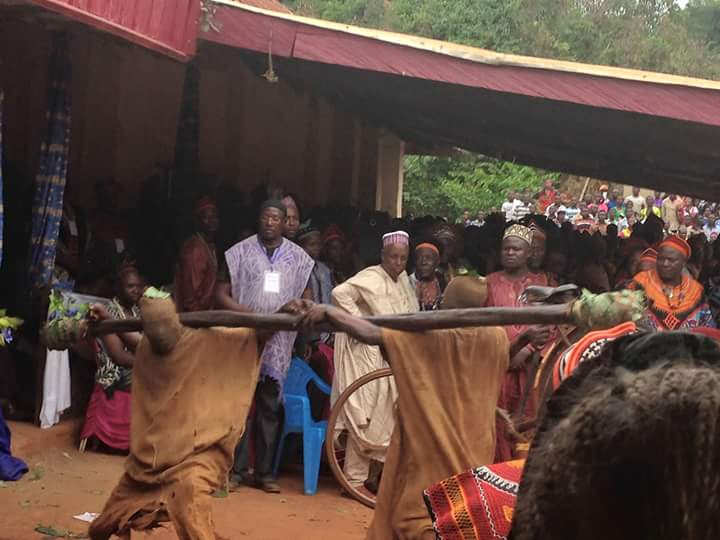
- Masquerades display during the Sha'atang

- Location within Cameroon
- Coordinates: 5°53′12″N 10°31′59″E
- Country: Cameroon
- Region: Northwest
- Department: Ngo-Ketunjia
- Elevation: 1,138 m (3,734 ft)

Population (2005)
  - Total: 20,863
- (Census)
- Time zone: UTC+1 (WAT)

Bambalang is a village located in the NorthWest Region of Cameroon. The village of Bambalang is one of the four villages that make up Ndop Central Sub Division and one of the thirteen villages that make up Ngoketunjia Division. Bambalang village saw most of its fertile land flooded upon the completion of the Bamendjin Dam in 1974 giving rise to some Islands like Mbissa, Nkeshie, Mbefekhu, Mishie and Mpayah. The Bamendjin Dam was constructed mainly to serve as a reservoir to feed the hydroelectric plant at Edéa. It was constructed across the Noun River, a tributary of the Sanaga River that operates the hydroelectric plant at Edea. The construction of this dam has served as a source of mixed feelings for Bambalang people because while those whose fertile land were flooded look at it as a mishap, it is beneficial to a cross section of the population given that it is contributing enormously to the economy of the village with thousands of fishermen whose lives and that of their families depend on fish (Bambalang fish) gotten from the water. The vegetation is Guinea Savanna as farming has destroyed most forests with the exception of the "Pa’ah Ngwong" Forest at the heart of the village (about 3.5 km^{2}). Bambalang village is mainly a hillock stretching in a North West, South-East direction. It is narrow at the North-West and broadens towards the South East, appearing as a semi-Island or a promontory. Bambalang has a length of about 21 km and a width of about 8 km giving an area of about 168 km^{2} supporting a population of 20.863 people.

== History ==
Myth holds that the Mbaw-Yakum people (known as Bambalang upon the arrival of the Germans) sprung out of a lake in a forest “Pa’ah Ngwong” at the heart of the village. It is believed that the original founders were nine in number referred to as “Ngwandipuh” i.e. the “Big Nine”. Ethnological studies trace the origin of the Mbaw-Yakum people from Ndobo in the Adamawa Region of Cameroon as well as other Tikari Villages in Ndop Plain. The Tikars migrated from Bornu in Northern Nigeria through Ndobo, Bafia and the Western Region to the North Western Region in the late 17th and early 18th Centuries A.D. The first settlement of the Mbaw-Yakum people must have been at Pa’ah Ngwong where a mysterious lake exist. It is in this small lake at the heart of the forest where myth holds that the founders of the village sprung out covering their heads with leaves of a herb “mbimboroh” (piper umbellatum). At that time tribal wars were rampant leading to frequent migrations. This explains the movement of small groups of people usually under a leader seeking refuge. The present Mbaw-Yakum village originated from a number of small villages led by chiefs who arrived and settled at different periods. Pa’ah Ngwong was the site where Yakum-Ntaw I had settled with his people. These groups were frequently attacked by enemies and at times the others united with enemies to fight against each other. It was to avoid this continuous fighting that a number of small villages were united by Yakum-Ntaw I to form one village under one leader known as Yakum. They decided to call themselves the Mbaw people under the leadership of Yakum hence the name Mbaw-Yakum. Mbaw-Yakum is related to other villages because they hold that Ngwafuongmbie, wife of Mangwa (leader of the “Big Nine”) had two sons and a daughter. The two sons were Tining and his elder brother Chungpikuh. Chungpikuh was a hunter while Tining remained at home and succeeded their father. Chungpikuh led a group of people who settled at the present land of Bamunka and became the Fon of Bamunka. However, other Mangeh villages belief that Mangeh had five children, two sons (Tuningmungwa and Chengfong) and three daughters (Byiae, Vhenji and Mekheng). The eldest Tunigmungwa succeeded their father and formed Bambalang while his brother Chengfonf established the Bamunka village whereas Byiae formed Bamali, Vhenji formed Bafanji and Mekheng the Bamunkumbit village. Bambalang and Bamunka were descendants of the males (sons of Mangeh) while Bafanji, Bamunkumbit and Bamali are the descendants of the daughters. These five villages, have formed the Mangeh Family Association to maintain peace and unity among themselves to ensure progress of all. These villages have no defined boundary between them because they know that they are one.

== Location ==
Bambalang is located between latitude 5°47’ and 5°55’N and longitude 10°26’ and 10°37’E. It is located S.E of Ndop plain and shares divisional boundaries to the East with Bamum (Noun Division) at Bangourian, Nkoumougba and Ngon-Njitapon Villages, to the South with Bamboutos Division at Bamendjing and Bagham villages. These boundaries shared with Noun and Bamboutos are also regional boundaries since the two Divisions are in the West Region. To the West, its neighbors are Bafanji and Balikumbat in Balikumbat Sub Division, to the North its neighbors are Bamali and Bamunka in Ndop Central Sub division and Baba I, Babessi and Bangolan in Babessi Sub Division.

== Administration ==
Bambalang Village is a second class Fondom in Cameroon with respect to the scale of administrative organization. The functioning, management and development of the village is placed directly under the authority of the Fon whose decision is guided by the “Ngumba” secret society and is final. Bambalang have had thirty three (33) Fons including the present Fon, H.R.M Fon Kelvin Shomitang II who was enthroned in 2009 upon the disappearance of his father. Remarkable amongst the previous Fons is Fon Shomitang I who did not have good times with his people. There were constant disagreements, which made him leave the palace with some of his supporters. Some provoked him, as he did not have children early. He reigned from about 1830-1885. He left the village and first settled at Banso where he became a close friend to the then Fon of Nso in about 1860. From Nso, Fon Shomitang with his people then left and settled next at Bamum meanwhile the people at home (Bambalang) made a provisional (tentative) Fon since the throne could not be left empty. While at Bamum his friendship with Sultan Nsangu strengthened while his people also became very friendly with the Bamums and were therefore involved in games with the Bamums. Shomitang lived with his wives in Bamum land for long and Mborongunu (who succeeded him) grew in Foumban. A remarkable legacy of his second reign upon return from Foumban was the introduction of the Royal Queen's Dance exclusively for members of the Royal Family called “Ndilow” which they learned at Bamum. The “Ndilow” dance is a special dance in Bambalang because it is performed only during special ceremonies for example during the funeral of a Queen, Fon and visits of Royal Guests.

== Health ==
Bambalang village have several health establishments including one medicalised health center with resident medical doctors, Care Center Clinic (private) with resident medical doctors and three other health centers in Mighang, Mbissa and Mbashie quarters. The use of modern medicine in Bambalang is gaining popularity with time as modern medicalization is gradually taking over from herbs. However, there exist some illnesses that are believed can only be treated with traditional herbs. Such illnesses include Typhoid, side pains, frontal headache etc. Inhabitants are however reluctant to go to health centres until their situation is deteriorating.

== Education ==
Bambalang village have several nursery schools both government and privately owned with over three hundred kids enrolled. There are over ten different government primary schools and over three private primary schools with a total enrollment of over six thousand children. For secondary schools, there is one Government Bilingual High School, one Government High School, two Government Secondary Schools, one Government Technical High School, One Government Technical College, and several private colleges like Mekilins, Christ the king, Progressive Secondary School etc.

Today, education have been embraced by all Bambalang Sons and Daughters with a new form of competition now arising among its inhabitants; that of who goes further in education than who. Bambalang sons and daughters are educationists and spotted nationwide teaching for the Government of Cameroon in numerous schools created. There is no single home in Bambalang without a child who has embraced Whiteman's education. However, the future of Whiteman's education in Bambalang is dented given that most of its sons and daughters drop out of school due to early and unwanted pregnancies, love for quick cash, lack of sponsors, unemployment etc.

== Culture ==
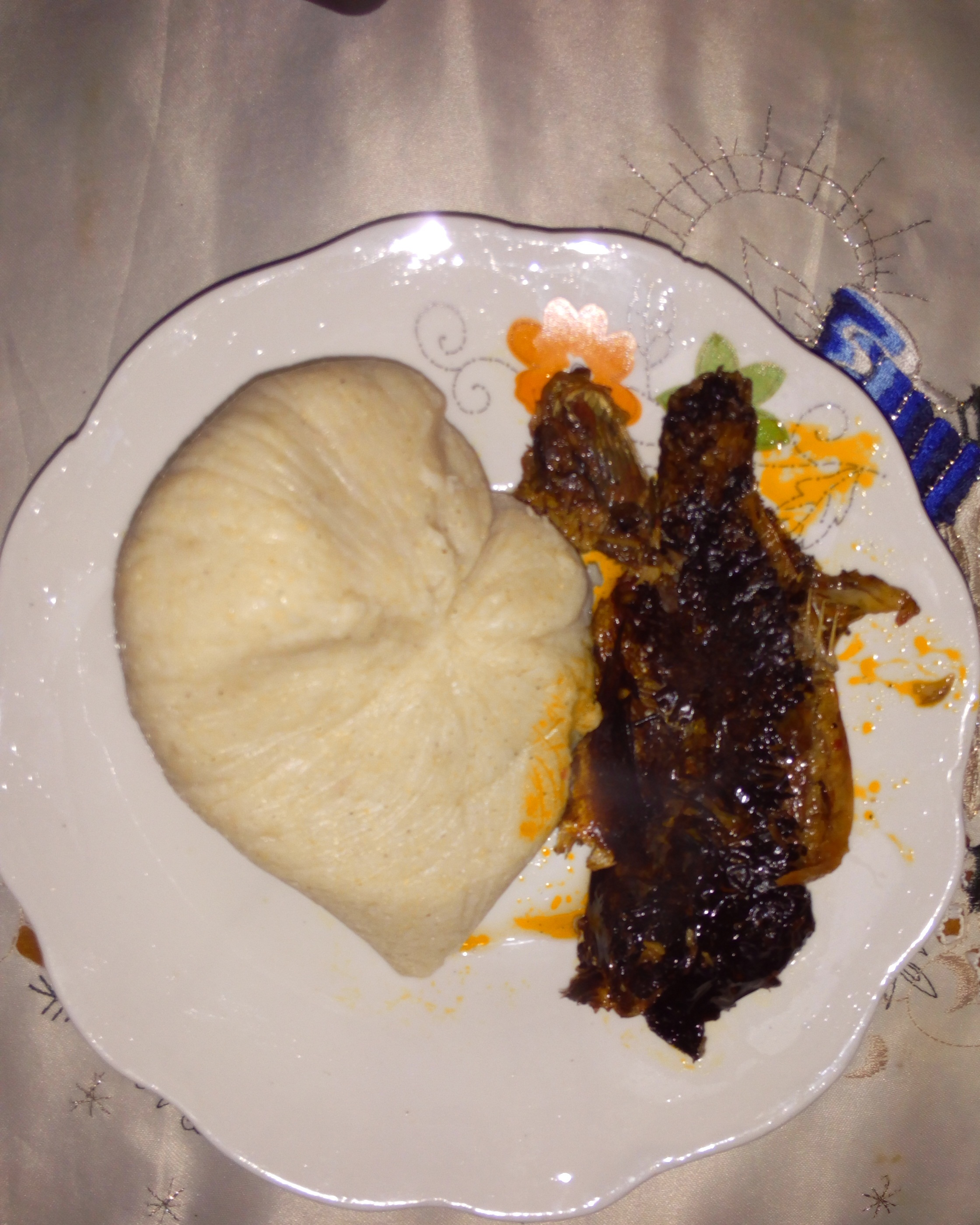
Common meal in Bambalang

Bambalang people boost a lot of cultural heritage including the Bambalang language. The Chrambouh, though, inter-spaced between the culture of the Mbaw Yakum People and that of Bamoun, because Bamoun's descendants occupy part of the Bambalang land. Quarters predominantly inhabited by Bamoun's descendants include: Mbissa Island, Mbashie, Njono, Mbafu, Nkeshi Island, Mbapishie with others living in some quarters. However, beside the culture of the Bamoun people, they respect the Bambalang culture and identify themselves as Bambalang people.. In Bambalang village, there are eight days of a week namely, Vi-Mitang, Vi-Ghei, Vi-Shaa, Vi-Nwi, Vi-Ngwong, Vi-Nkwi, Vi-Fongoung and Vi-Nkwa. There are two “contri-Sundays” (Vi-Nwi and Vi-Nkwi) which are considered as holy days in the village. On these days, inhabitants are expected not to go to the farm, to be calm meanwhile funerals are mostly organized on these days. Vi-Nkwa is the main market day though there are some sub markets like in Mbachoro, Mbasha, Mighang and Mbissa Island. On these market days, commodities are sold ranging from food crops through dresses and electronic gadgets. Bambalang Market attracts visitors the entire North West Region and West Regions of the country. These visitors come to buy food crops like groundnuts, maize, fish, goats, contri fowl among others.

=== Twins ===
In Bambalang village, the delivery of twins is seen as a sign of blessing and the children given some preferential treatment from birth. Upon birth of twins, the mother and father are given special attributes like “Ntapah” and “Tapinui” respectively while the children are given names with respect to the order of delivery; Nkeh if the first is a male and Shengwe if the first is a female while Mingo is generally used for both male and female if they are second. Whether the first is a female or male, they are reserved for the Palace, something that used to be a pride.

=== Nchindas(servants) ===
The Nchindas (servants) enroll into the service of the palace, undergoing rigorous but shrewd training for more than ten years though it has greatly reduced to a few years due to the requirements of the formal education system. There are two types of Nchindas: those to serve the Ngumba and those to serve the Fon. Nchindas graduate from the palace after gaining knowledge and used to the way peace and order is maintained in the village. Upon graduation, a porcupine spine is stuck into his cap. After graduation the ex-nchinda enjoys some privileges: Succeeds their father, Honoured with traditional title, given wives by the Fon, Accompany the Kwifon to funerals and enjoy the privileges thereof (food and drinks).

=== Sha'atang (Annual Cultural Festival ===
The Sha’atang epitomizes the Mbaw-Yakum people because it is a period of communion and reunion. Before the coming of the Christmas, villagers knew that they had to buy new dresses for their children during Sha’atang. Before the reign of Fon Ghogomu, death celebrations of late Fons were frequent often provoked by problems that threatened the welfare and health of the Fondom. In such situations, the gods of the land were always consulted. A common answer was that one of the late Fons was angry that the villagers have neglected him for long. An eleven days of ceremonies (to usher peace) was then observed and the celebration carried out. If after this a similar revelation was made of another Fon, another death celebration was carried out immediately, so that a lot of time for farming and other gainful activities were lost this way. Because of this Fon Ghogomu suggested to the Kwifon that the celebration of all late Fons could be jointly done, once a year. i.e. an Annual Cultural Festival. This period is a week of peace (retreat) when there should be no quarreling, fighting, shouting and farming. The rest of the period could therefore be used for farming and other gainful activities since this is done once a year.

== Economy ==
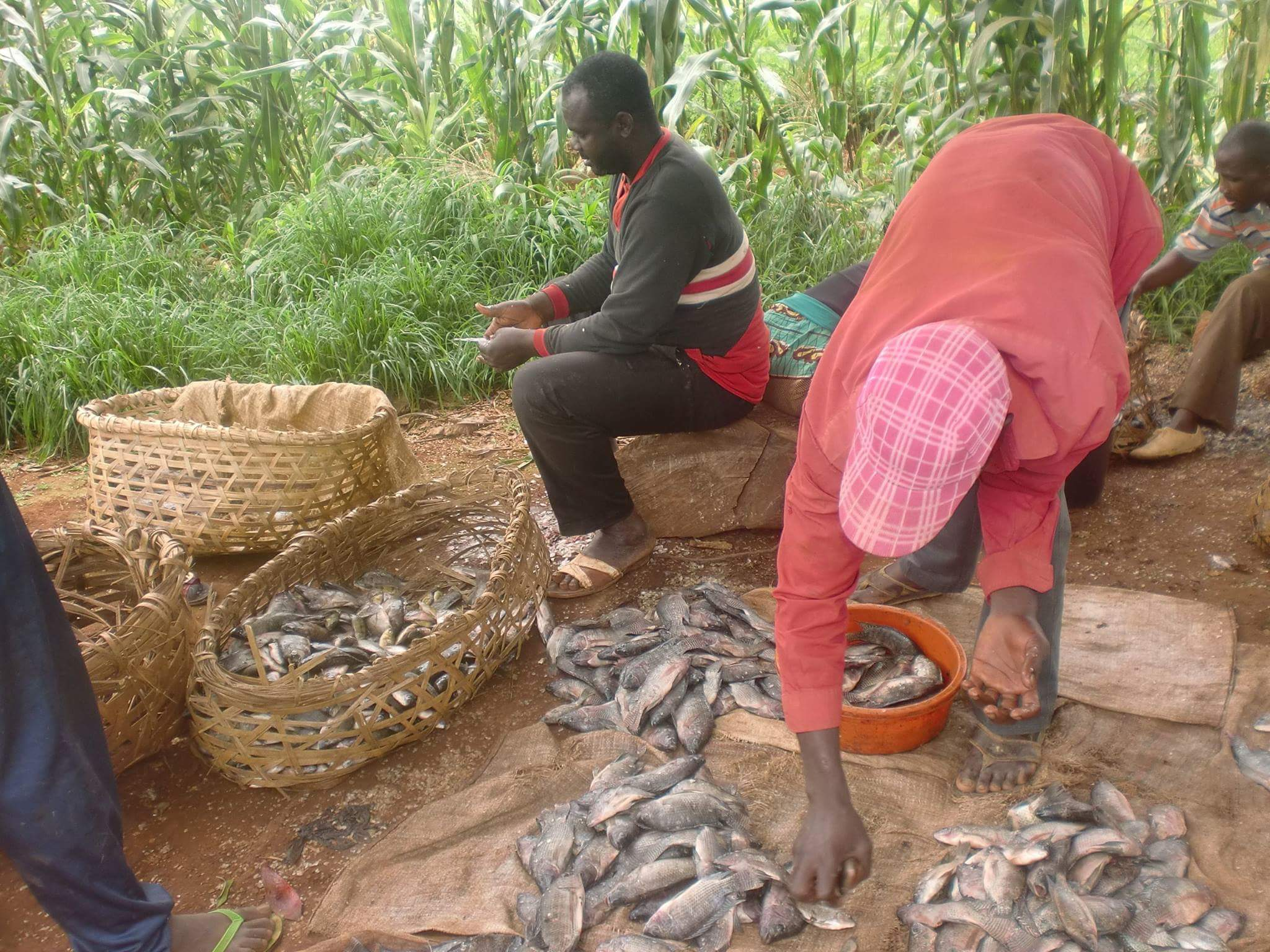
Fishing in Bambalang

The people of Bambalang village are mostly involved in agriculture especially the cultivation of groundnuts and maize. Groundnuts cultivated in Bambalang (contri groundnut) are unique in shape and taste, being found nowhere else. The people of Bambalang also participate in fish farming which is one of the main income generating activities.

== Tourism ==
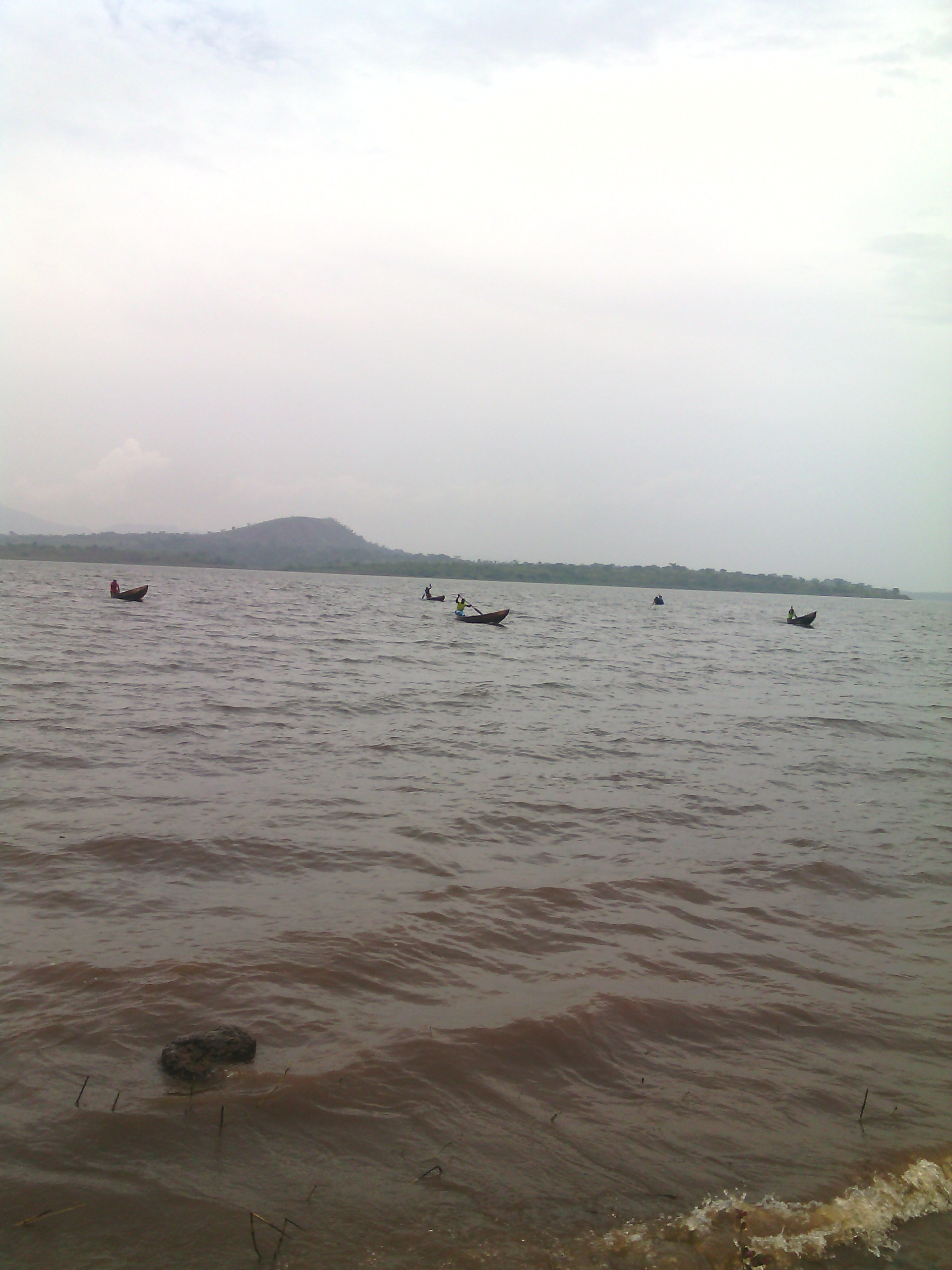
Sandy Beach of Mbissa, Bambalang

Movement in and around Bambalang is aided thanks to good road network though not tarred. The earth road is constructed with gravel that makes it possible to move freely. There are several touristic attractions in Bambalang including the Sandy Beaches of Mbissa Island where an ecotouristic site have been constructed attracting visitors from around the world.

The construction of a Royal Museum in the Fon's Palace has boosted the attraction of the Palace to visitors who come in their numbers to see for themselves artifacts. Prominent among the artifacts found in the Royal Museum is a walking stick that was used by Fon Shomitang I. Fon Shomitang's corpse was never seen as he told his kinsmen that whenever the walking stick is seen without him, they should know he is no more. The Minister of Arts and Culture, Professor Narcisse Mouelle Kombi, disclosed during the 2016 edition of the sha'atang the imminent insertion of the Mbaw-Yakum (Bambalang Palace Museum Project) into the United Nations Educational Scientific and Cultural Organisation, UNESCO, Project. He was marveled especially by the combination of tradition and modernism in architectural blend that gives the palace a unique attraction for tourists. He equally promised the training of museum attendants and financial assistance for the renovation of the palace if means permit.

== Politics ==
With the return of multi-party politics in 1990 most Bambalang people became excited. There were accusations and counter accusations between militants of the ruling party CPDM and militants of the SDF. The S.D.F provoked those in the C.P.D.M, calling them embezzlers and enemies of progress. In early 1990 only die hard C.P.D.Ms openly militated in their party. On the other hand, the C.P.D.M militants looked at the S.D.F as rebels and vandals who were out to create havoc and having nothing to offer. Today in Bambalang these extreme views have been dropped. The Fon HRM KEVIN SHOMITANG II (a supporter of the party in Power, the C.P.D.M) has called on his people to rethink the raison d’etre of politics and to embark on politics for development. Bambalang village is home to Prof. Paul Mingo Ghogomu, a politician who was appointed Director of Cabinet at the Prime Minister's office in 2009.

== Notable residents ==
- Paul mingo Ghogomu
