= Bamunka =

Bamunka is a small village of Cameroon located in the North West Region along the ring road from Bamenda. Bamunka Village is the Sub Divisional Headquarter of Ndop Central Subdivision and the Divisional Headquarter of Ngoketunjia Division.

Bamunka village is located some 42 km away from Bamenda town on the Bamenda-Nkambe stretch of the ring road. The village has direct boundaries with Babungo, Baba I, Babessi, Bambalang, Bamessing, Bamali and with the Bello Sub Division.

== History ==
Meukoh or Nkoh-chandeuh people is a village which became known as Bamunka upon the arrival of the Germans. Being one of the villages of Ngoketunjia Division, the Meukoh people just like other villages of Ngoketunjia Division have the names of their villages starting with "Ba" meaning the "people of". The prefix "Ba" was introduced during the arrival of the Germans to mean the people of Meukoh land.

Ngwafuongmbie wife of Mangwa (Founder of present-day Mbaw-Yakum) had two sons and daughters. The two sons were Tining and his elder brother Chungpikuh who was a hunter. Tining remained at home (Mbaw-Yakum) and succeeded their father (Mangwa).

Chungpikuh was a hunter and led a group of people who settled at the present land of the Meukoh people (Bamunka). According to tradition by then, when you kill an animal you cannot slaughter until your father gives you the right to do so. Because of his distance some of the animals got rotten before he arrived Bambalang to present to his father. To prevent this the father therefore gave him the "knife" i.e. the right to kill and slaughter and dry and only bring dried meat to him. His father also gave him the right to control those he was hunting with. He was also advised to judge and settle cases among his people rather than coming to Mbaw-Yakum for this. Finally his father crowned him the Fon of that village i.e. the Fon of Meukoh (Bamunka).

Once upon a time in 1484 there were two brothers, the older one called Tunimangwa and the younger Cheng, who lived with their parents at Ndobo in the Adamawa Region of Cameroon. Apparently not being satisfied with the selection of a new Fon in Ndobo, following the death of their father, they decided to migrate to new lands so as to establish their own fondoms where possible. The two brothers formed two groups of their followers which each led as his people. The group which Cheng led comprised twelve in number and subsequently became Bamunka Village with Cheng as their Fon. As Cheng Became Chengfong, the twelve became Chengfong people and held prominent positions in Bamunka under Chengfong. The other group that Tunimangwa led eventually became Bambalang with members of his group also holding prominent positions in Bambalang and the successors of these two groups have maintained their prominence in both Bamunka and Bambalang villages to date.

Bambalang (Mbaw-Yakum) and Bamunka (Meukoh) were descendants of the males (sons of Mangeh) while Bafanji, Bamunkumbit and Bamali are the descendants of the daughters. These five villages because of their relationship have formed the Mangeh Family Association. The formation of this association is to maintain peace and unity amongst these villages and to ensure progress of all of them. For that reason, they have created branches all over the world so as to come back home and develop their respective villages. There is also no defined boundary that exist between one mangeh village and another because they are descendants of one (sons and daughters of Mangeh).

== Culture ==
The Bamunka people have some cultural heritage that they hold jealously and are preserving it. Unlike the Gregorian calendar with 7 days of the week, there are eight (8) days of the week in Bamunka including Mbimbee; equivalent to the Christian Sunday, Mbikoh: free working day, Mbimboune: Free working day, Mbingow: Free working day and main market day, Mbibehkah: Njangi day but otherwise free for work, Mbiliteh: Free working day, Mbiyih: Rest Day and lovers day, Mbikedih: Free working day.

=== Marriages ===
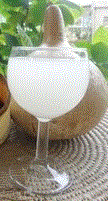
Palm Wine

In the case of a potential marriage between the son and daughter of an ordinary Meukoh citizen, an intermediary informs the father of the future bride that one of his friends intends to "steal" from his compound. This informative contact takes place a number of times and could be done even along the road, in a Njangi house, at a death celebration, in the farm, in the weekly market etc. If the father of the potential bride is interested, he asks the go-between the name of the friend intending to steal from his compound; discussions then ensue, which may end up with the revelation of the identity of the future groom. It is common for parents to initially negotiate marriages for their sons without revealing their identity until it becomes necessary to do so. After eventual clarifications of obscure issues, the father of the girl pours some Palm-Wine (local liquor) brought by the guests into his cup, drinks it before passing the cup to his wife (mother of the future bride) who also drinks before passing it to her daughter who drinks and hands it over to the would-be husband. This is a symbolic acceptance of the groom in the presence of the bride's parents.

The practice of a man falling in love with the sister of his wife that used to be common in Bamunka has been condemned into extinction. The practice was tolerated because at first the Bamunnka Man was not allowed near his nursing wife until the child was at least two years old and walking about before its mother could stop breast feeding. This could be very difficult for a man who was then permitted to fall in love with his sister-in law rather than go outside the family. The theory has now evaporated and an end put to the practice.

=== The Fon ===
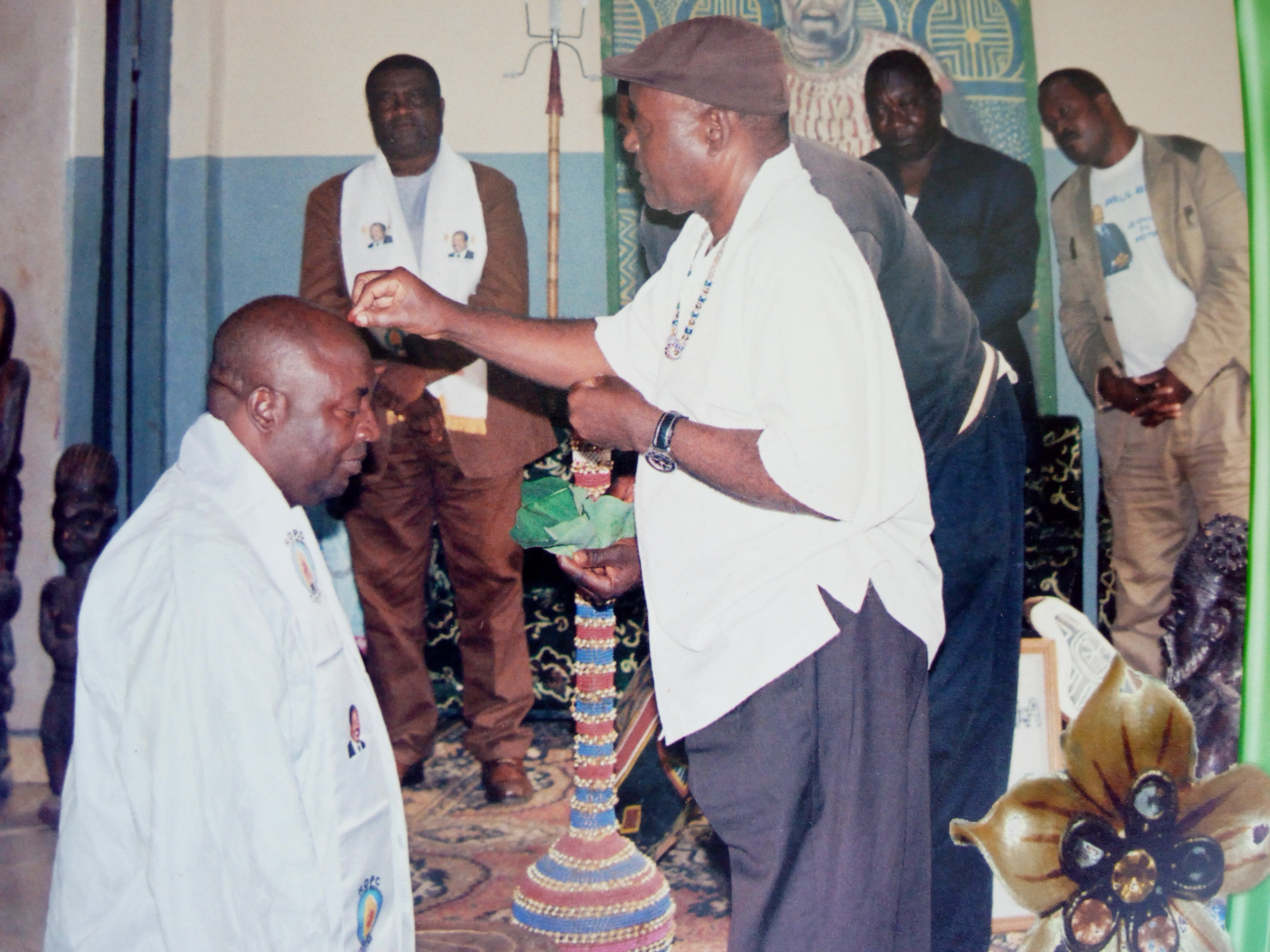
Senator Dingha Ignatius Bayin Receives traditional Benediction upon his election to the Senate

The Fon is the custodian of the custom and tradition of the Bamunka people and whelms much power, is respected and honored. In the old days leprosy was rampant to the extent that many Fons caught it. Because of this, Fons insisted that people should remove their shoes so that the Fon can see that they were not lepers. Lepers would be allowed far away from the Fon. People in the old days did not realize that leprosy came from their unhygienic conditions. This probably explains why even up to date, people are not allowed into the Fon's sitting room with shoes. You must remove your shoes as a sign of honor before entering the Fon's sitting room .

When someone is enthroned Fon, he sits at the entrance to Kwifong's compound and for the last time in his life he greets commoners by the hand but draw away power from them which he stores in a bag hanging from writs. After the exercise he ceases to shake hands with commoners just so that they may not draw back his power. Some people hold that during that exercise of laying hands the bag which he carries on his wrist becomes very heavy so that not even four people could lift up. This may also explain why there is also the interesting exercise of hands laying when a priest is ordained. Sometimes it is interesting how these things are the same although they dance round and round in different cycles.

=== Communal ===
In the village of Bamunka, communal is carried out on the orders of the Kwifong and whoever gives orders for such work including the Fon, must do so in the name of Kwifon who will use his coercive powers in case of disobedience. Communal labor which is called "Nkheng" in Bamunka is carried out in many ways. It can be done by way of levy on the whole village to pay a certain amount. It can also be done by way of delegates of quarters or by the entire village being called out to perform certain tasks such as road clearing, construction and bridge building. In each of the a fore-named every adult is expected to come out quarter by quarter and report to their quarter head to perform its share of the task. Everyone in every quarter is expected to obey the call. Any failure to attend entails a penalty which can be enforced using Kwifong coercion injunction.

Traditional injunctions vary in their gravity and source in Bamunka. We have the Kwifon sign of Injunction, the Gueiteh sign of injunction, the Goeh sign of injunction, Nyi or god sign of injunction by quarter heads and the commoner's sign of injunction. Incidentally the quarter-head's sign of injunction is the same as the sign for peace in Bamunka as well as the sign for Bamunka traditional gods called "Nyi". An injunction indicates that the person enjoined has failed to obey the community one way or another and that by the injunction he is required without failure to report with the injunction to his quarter-head who should explain to him what the penalty is or where to go to perform his task. Injunctions are delivered in varying ways. Where there is pregnant woman in the compound of the enjoined the injunction is tied to a tree and nailed on a cut plantain stem instead of on the ground in the yard as is the normal practice. When all members of an entire household fail to perform communal labor, the injunction is nailed at the middle of the yard and until all of them carry out the task or pay the fine, the injunction is not removed and the persons enjoined cannot perform even their job without first performing the communal labor. In the case of any doubt, the right place to go to the quarter-head who should either solve the problem or direct the enjoined to where he should go to have his problem resolved.

Since injunctions are in descending order of authority, disobedience of an injunction may lead to a higher one with higher fine and severer methods of enforcement. When the person enjoined does not know the fine or requirement of the injunction, he must go to the source of the injunction to find out what the fine is or what he should do.

=== Deaths ===
The dead in Bamunka is washed, rubbed, and dressed up with a cap to match for men. The dead is then sat on a chair in a hold in the ground and covered with soil with head turned upwards and mouth opened with a Bamboo put in it for subsequent performances through the holes left by the Bamboo. Something commonly referred to in Bamunka as "turning bamboo".

Burial nowadays is in a coffin which in Bamunka tradition a hole is made on the coffin for a Bamboo to be put through to the mouth for the dead for the same purpose as above. This Bamboo is turned round weekly or so by selected members of the deceased family until a stated number of weeks usually odd weeks of seven, nine, eleven, thirteen or fifteen weeks when this Bamboo is ceremoniously removed by the successor of the dead person living the hole there for ritual offerings whenever the need arises. No burial in Bamunka land may take place at mid-day. It must be before or after. The reason is not known but it has been so for time immemorial.

The practice of women mourning naked is ceasing to exist in Bamunka, though women still mourn here half naked by covering the down part of their bodies only.

=== Succession ===
Bamunka village practice patrilineal succession where children succeed their parents directly and only men may succeed men and women as well. Generally the son of a person who served the Fon or Kwifong in the palace is the one with priority over his brothers to succeed their father when he dies. In some rare cases a father is known to have named another son to succeed him and left out the one who served at the palace. The tradition is also that the one who succeeds takes all the landed and non landed property belonging to their late father. Thereafter he carries the responsibility of looking after brothers and sisters, his late father's widows whom he is free to marry. In short he steps into his late father's shoes and become him to all concerned. They respect him, obey him and call him after just as they did to their late father. Anything meant for their late father is received by him and that intended to be done by his late father is done by him. He does not however marry his own mother and that's the only exception since Bamunka people are mostly Polygamists. Generally, the system of succession in Bamunka is an accepted traditional "Will" which even the legal authorities acknowledge as well.

=== Servants (Chindas) ===
The usual length of serving either the Fon or Kwifong used to be 8 to 10 or even 15 years which has now been slashed to 4 or 5 years. The actual age of entering the palace to serve either the Fon or Kwifong is 8 to 10 years. Of course the Fon is protective of his own wives if older ones are left to stay in the palace for too long. One of the advantages that goes with either serving the Fon or Kwifong is that upon his graduation from the palace he who has served succeeds his own father upon his death although this rule is not invariable.

=== Traditional societies ===
In Bamunka the highest traditional society the "Ngumba" is called "Nwuseh" Nwoseh is the traditional prime minister of the village who is said to have emigrated from Bafut leaving his children there. He virtually administers the village as his members are commoners who take their decisions to administer the village in the House of Commons with the fon merely obliged to sign it for enforcement although he has chance to negotiate for its amendment. Kwifong possesses coercive powers and although the fon may at certain points be forced to rule by decree, the fon must resort to the Kwifong if his orders are not being accepted by the people since the fon has no coercive powers to enforce his will. In practice, the fon can only issue out orders to his people through Kwifong and in the name of Kwifong (Nwoseh) which actually means owner of the land of Bamunka. Done in a way that there is no disobedience of any such order, the coercive instruments of Kwifong would be activated to ensure compliance with the order. Membership into this secret society is only to males and who must be only commoners and formally initiated into the Kwifong society at a given age. Only the Fon alone from the royal family is allowed to be a member of this secret society and it is during his enthronement. A member of Kwifong before initiation must take an oath promising to keep the secrets of Kwifong at all times from none members. Princes and their descendants down to the fourth generation cannot be member of Kwifong and they may belong to other secret societies called Guiteh.

Princesses who must necessarily marry commoners, have their male children as members of Kwifong and not of Gueiteh secret society. A few selected persons as the fon himself are members of both Kwifong and Gueiteh for ease of administration but not to the extent that a prince other than the fon himself can be allowed to see Kwifong in Bamunka. Those who gain this double membership are commoners at the discretion of the fon or are of a particular class in the village according to their functions. It is an obligation that upon the death of a commoner who is member of Kwifong, Kwifong must attend his burial and if of Gueiteh, Gueiteh must attend his burial. Thus if one is member of both Kwifong and Gueiteh, then both must attend his burial.

One day a week (on Bimbee) is set aside on which Kwifong can re-assert its authority over the village through its thundering sound but without actually leaving its residence. Any other day that Kwifong thunders in the same way is on a special occasion which the villagers must know in advance and should Kwifong thunder unexpectedly the villagers must report to the Fon's palace together with women and those men who are members of Kwifong must go to its compound to find out why it thundered unexpectedly since Kwifong does not thunder in vain. On the whole one may compare the functions of Kwifong with those of the Prime Minister of Britain in Parliament, and of the Fon in Bamunka as head of the village, to the Queen of the United Kingdom as head of the British State. While the Kwifong secret society is the institution of Bamunka comparable to the House of Commons under British system, then clearly Gueiteh is in Bamunka performing the functions of the House of Lords under the British system. Its members are princes and their male descendants with a few of them who have passed the fourth generation are privileged to be member of both Kwifong and of Gueiteh. The Fon of Bamunka as already stated is one of such privilege to be member of both houses. Gueiteh is also resident in the Fon's palace as is Kwifong but both secret societies have their compounds well away from each other. Although all princes and their descendants are potential members of Gueiteh, they are not automatically admitted there unless they attend a certain age of reasoning that is when they understand what they are doing when they apply to be admitted into the Gueiteh secret society. Those who apply and are accepted are admitted through an initiation procedure which forces anyone to confess if he had secretly seen Gueiteh and the punishment is usually severe and they must then pay heavy finds before admission if at all. The same conditions apply to membership of Kwifong. In some circumstances the applicant is refused admission altogether. Spirits are supposed to befell anyone who sees either Kwifong or Gueiteh secretly.

In the annual rituals that take place between December and February of the following year, Gueiteh follows after Kwifong in the rituals but does not go to all the shrines to which Kwifong must go. Also in ordinary death celebrations, Gueiteh attends only the death, burial and celebrations of its members but does not go out to other villages for the deaths of friendly Fons and their mothers as Kwifong does. However, Gueiteh attends death, burials and celebrations of princes and princesses.

=== Traditional titles of Bamunka ===
There are several titles in Bamunka among them; Fon, Bohboh, Ntoh.

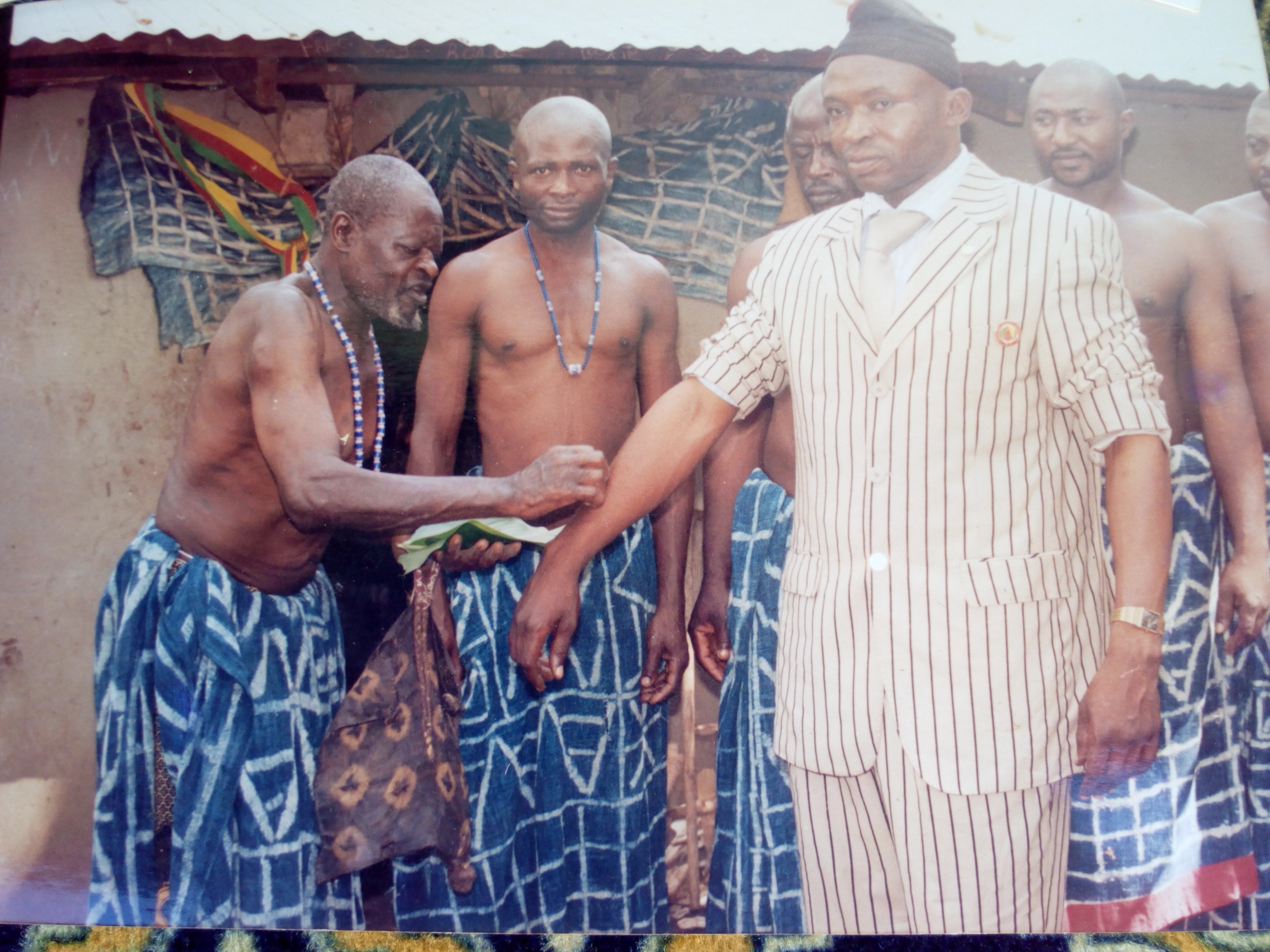
Dr. Ntoh Daniel Belengka receives traditional benediction upon his election as Lord Mayor of Ndop Council, 2007

- Fon is the highest title in Bamunka held only by the traditional ruler alone.
- Bohboh is a royal title given only to descendants of the Fon and inherited down the line to not more than four generation before transformation. Those bearing Bohboh as title cannot see Kwifong unless they are descendants at the 5th generation, presently reduced to 4th generation. That is the Bohboh who is son of a Fon cannot see Kwifong. His son too cannot as well and his Son's son still cannot but his son's son's son can see kwifong because he is said to have transformed into a commoner at that stage and may be permission by both Gueiteh and Kwifong. Bohboh is the second highest title in Bamunka after that of the Fon. It cannot be given to any commoner like is the case with "Ntoh, Tatah, and Nini. Ironically strangers are sometimes given the title just by assumption that they were of that rank in their own village and in a way to entice him to stay and continue contributing to the development of the village.
- Ntoh is the third title of nobility in Bamunka village. This title can be given to any commoner by the Fon as he pleases but he must first find a fiction by which he will allege that at one time a certain person holding that title died childless and so left the title vacant and he install the concerned to vacant land in the village which will be alleged once belonged to that title holder and of course the new title holder will become his successor on that piece of land. There is usually some money and gifts paid and whether the successor actually settles on that land or not seems no one's concern. Also those Bohbohs who have reached the level of transformation from Gueiteh to also see Kwifong may have both the title of Bohboh as well as that of Ntoh like was the case with the late Bohboh Ntohbientoh. Any Fon's wife who has given birth also gets the title of Ntoh instead of Chinjia for all young ladies who marry the fon. However, such "Ntoh" must be indicated clearly immediately after with "Woentoh".

== Administration ==
Current administrative arrangements have resulted in the emergence of a peri-urban Centre (popularly known as Ndop or Bamunka Urban). The peri-urban Centre is located along the Bamenda-Nkambe stretch of the ring road and extends a little bit from the boundary with Bamali village situated beyond the Ndop Cooperative Union to beyond Saint Mary's Catholic Comprehensive High School which stretches into Babungo village.

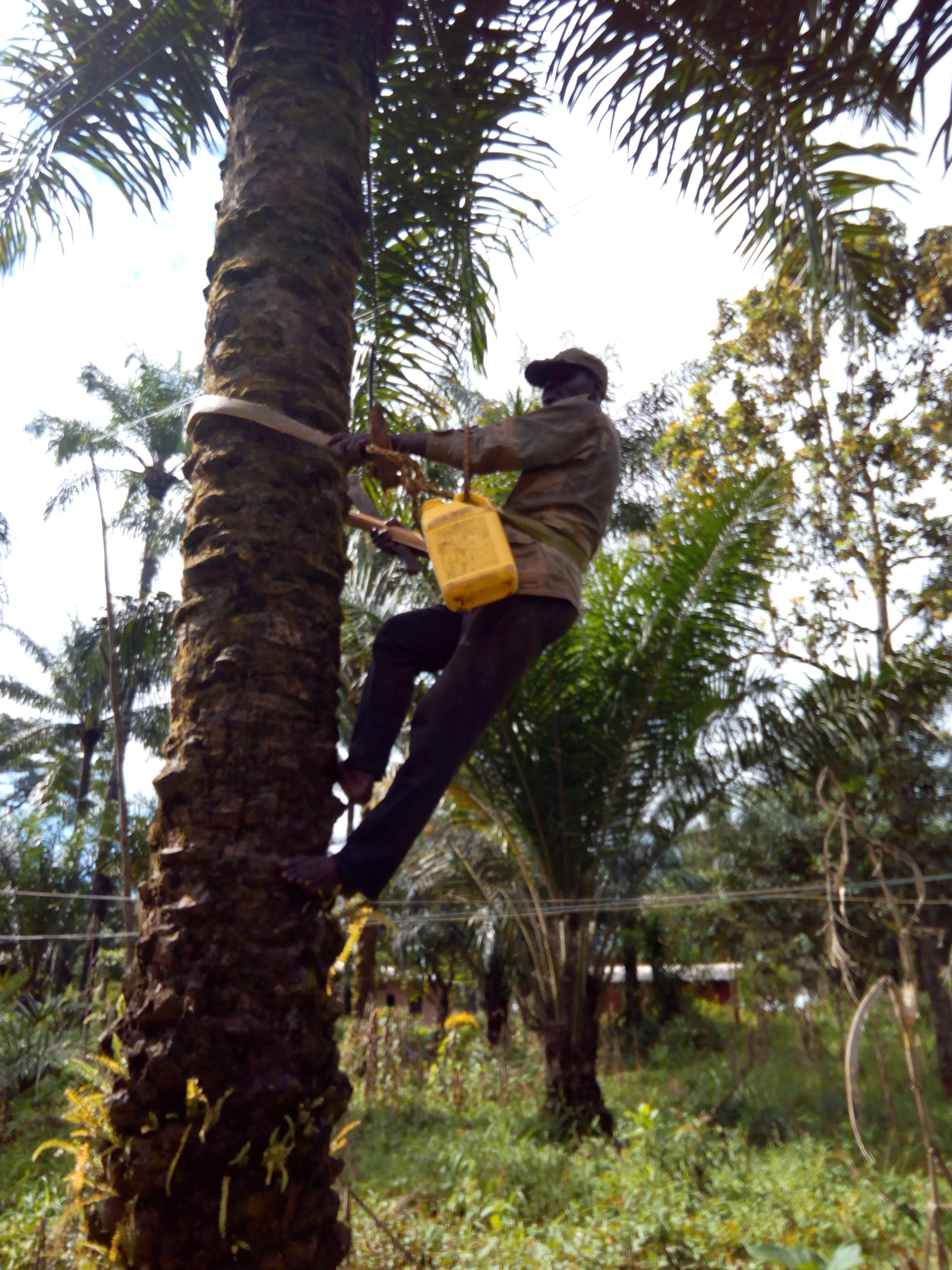
Palm Wine Tapping in Bamunka
