= Babungo =

Babungo or Bamungo may refer to:

- Babungo people, an ethnic group
- Babungo language, spoken by the Babungo people
- Babungo (village), Northwest Region of Cameroon
- Babungo Museum, Ndop, Cameroon
