= Babungo (village) =

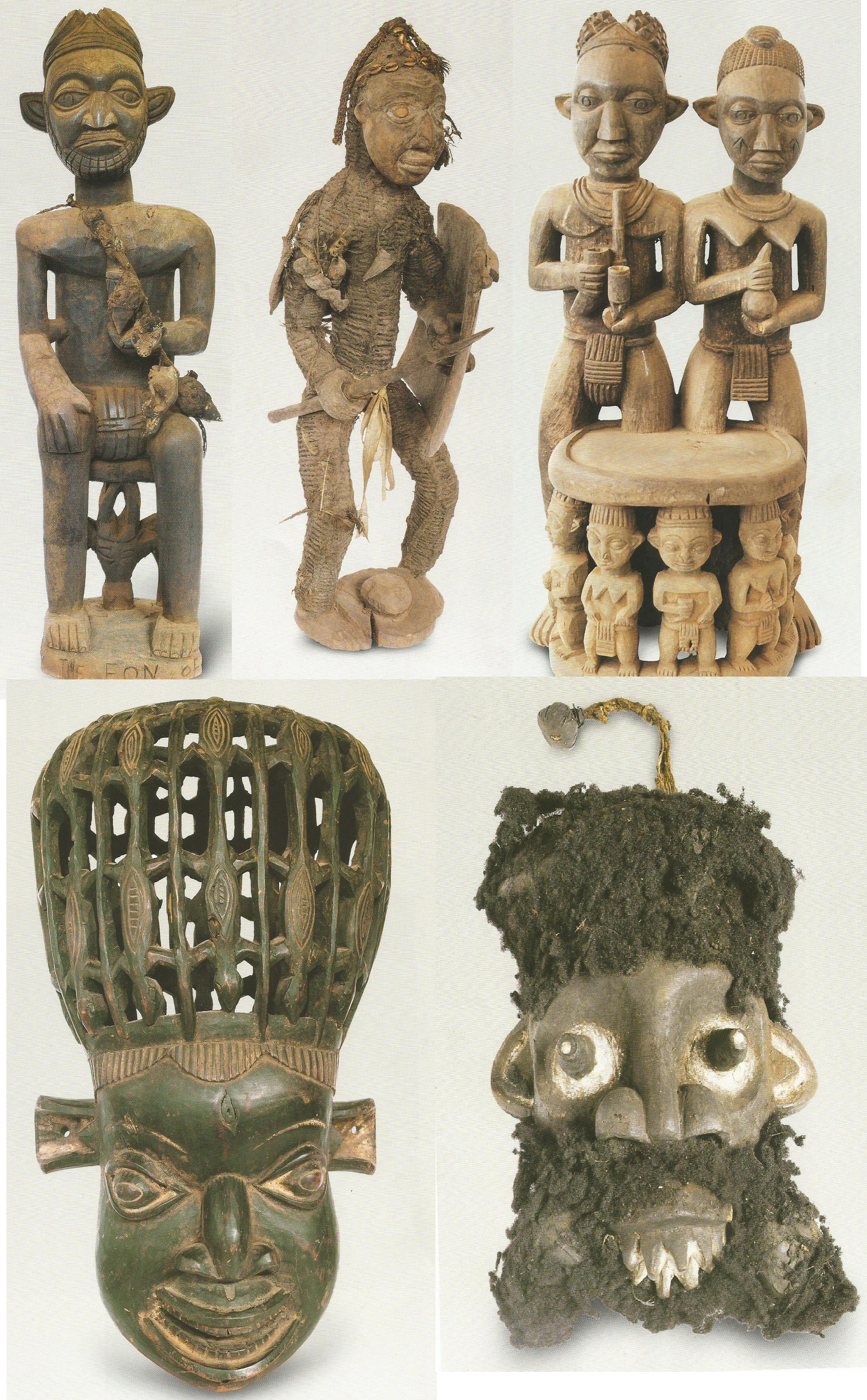
- Sculptures found in the Babungo Museum

- Location within Cameroon
- Coordinates: 6°4′0″N 10°26′0″E
- Country: Cameroon
- Region: Northwest
- Department: Ngo-Ketunjia
- Elevation: 1,276 m (4,186 ft)

Population (2005)
  - Total: 11.344
- (Census)
- Time zone: UTC+1 (WAT)

Babungo is one of the four villages of Babessi Sub Division, Ngoketunjia Division of the North West Region Cameroon. It is situated on the Ring Road from Bamenda about ten kilometers (6.2 miles) from Bamunka on the high plain of Ndop which is fertile and rich in water, intensely cultivated and surrounded by a ring of hills covered with pastures, making it an ideal grazing land.

Since October 2003, Babungo Museum started to contribute to the development of the cultural values aimed at overcoming the gap between local and global, as well as between tradition and modernity. They opened up new job opportunities and possibilities for development linked to the enhancement of an important resource of the country, whilst reinforcing the conscience of a rich cultural identity opened to encounter and exchange with the cultures of the world. The museum was designed using local materials, techniques and labor thanks to an Italian architect Antonio Piva, lecturer in museography at the faculty of Architecture of the Politecnico of Milan and a UNESCO collaborator. Upon the opening of this museum to the public, it has been attracting a lot of visitors to Babungo village to see the sculptures.

== Administration and politics ==
The ngumba is the strongest political institution in Babungo. It represents the executive power of the traditional government, which limits the power of the fon. The elder members of the ngumba also have an important role in the burial of the fon and in the enthronement of his successor. Thus the Babungo say that the ngumba is a kingmaker and that it is the father of fons. Other customary societies with an important role in Babungo include: the samba, organized at the level of the quarter, which helps the tii ntih to regulate the life of the community.

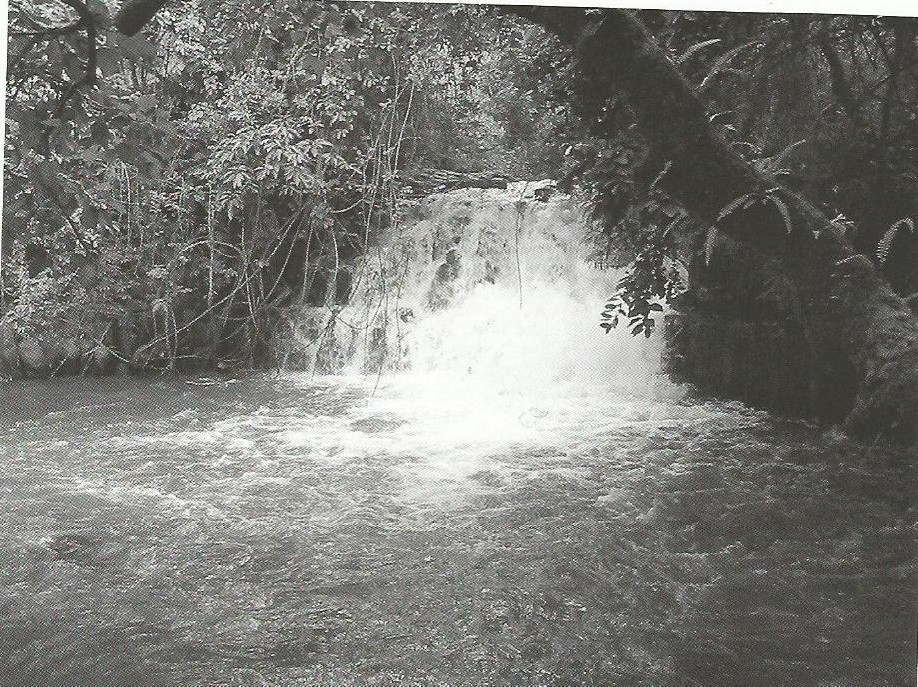
A fall where masquerades were believed to emerge and fight for the Babungo during wars

== Transport ==
Movement to Babungo from Bamenda is along the tarred ring road since the village is located along the stretch of the ring road through Bamunka, while movement within the village is on earth road. Vehicles move in and within the village easily.
