= Ndop prison break =

2018 prison break in Cameroon

- Part of the Anglophone Crisis
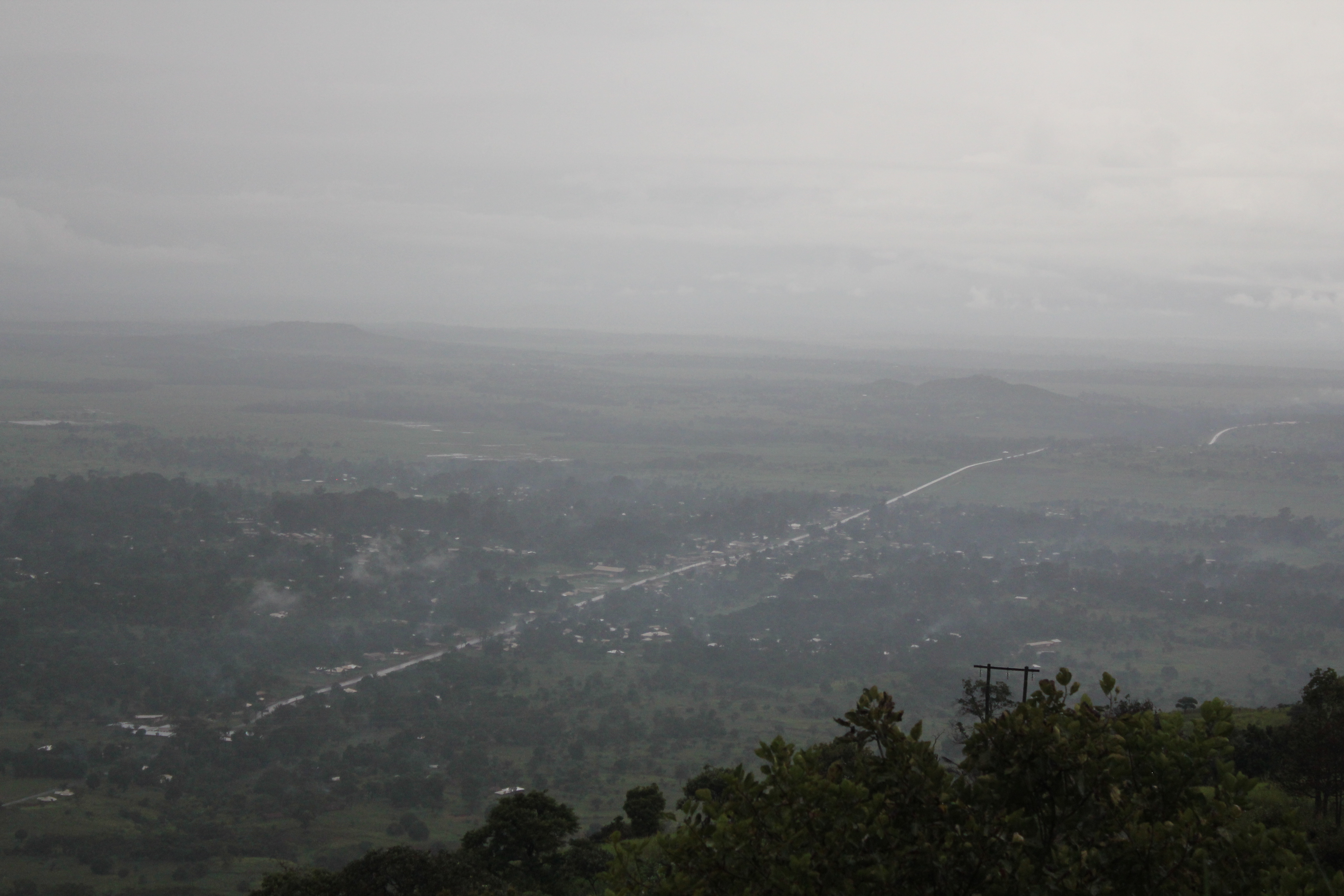
- View of the village of Ndop
Date	28 July 2018
Location	Ndop, Northwest Region
Result	Ambazonian victory

Belligerents
Cameroon	Ambazonia

Strength
Prison guards (initially), gendarmes and soldiers (reinforcements)	At least 50 (according to the Cameroonian army)

The Ndop prison break occurred on 28 July 2018, when Ambazonian separatists broke into the Ndop central prison and freed 163 inmates.

== Prison break ==
Late in the evening, at least 50 separatist fighters stormed the premises of the Ndop central prison. They managed to outgun the guards who were on duty and brought down the prison gates, enabling 163 inmates to escape. Despite the arrival of reinforcements, Cameroonian forces were unable to prevent the separatists from burning down the prison. During the raid, the separatists seized weapons and ammunition from the prison before retreating.

== Aftermath ==
Immediately following the raid, Cameroonian forces launched a manhunt to catch the fugitives. However, many were able to hide in the crowd, making their re-arrest difficult. The raid was the first of its kind since the start of the Anglophone Crisis.
