= Babungo Museum =

Coordinates: 6.07153°N 10.44231°E

- Location: Ndop, Cameroon
- Type: Art museum, Cultural museum
- Curator: Laurence Mbowoh, Julius Ndifor Kamu, Protus Bofua

The Babungo Museum is an art and cultural museum located in Ndop, Cameroon.
