= Babessi (village) =

- Location within Cameroon
- Coordinates: 6°02′00″N 10°34′45″E
- Country: Cameroon
- Region: Northwest
- Department: Ngo-Ketunjia

Population (2005)
  - Total: 26,802
- (Census)
- Time zone: UTC+1 (WAT)

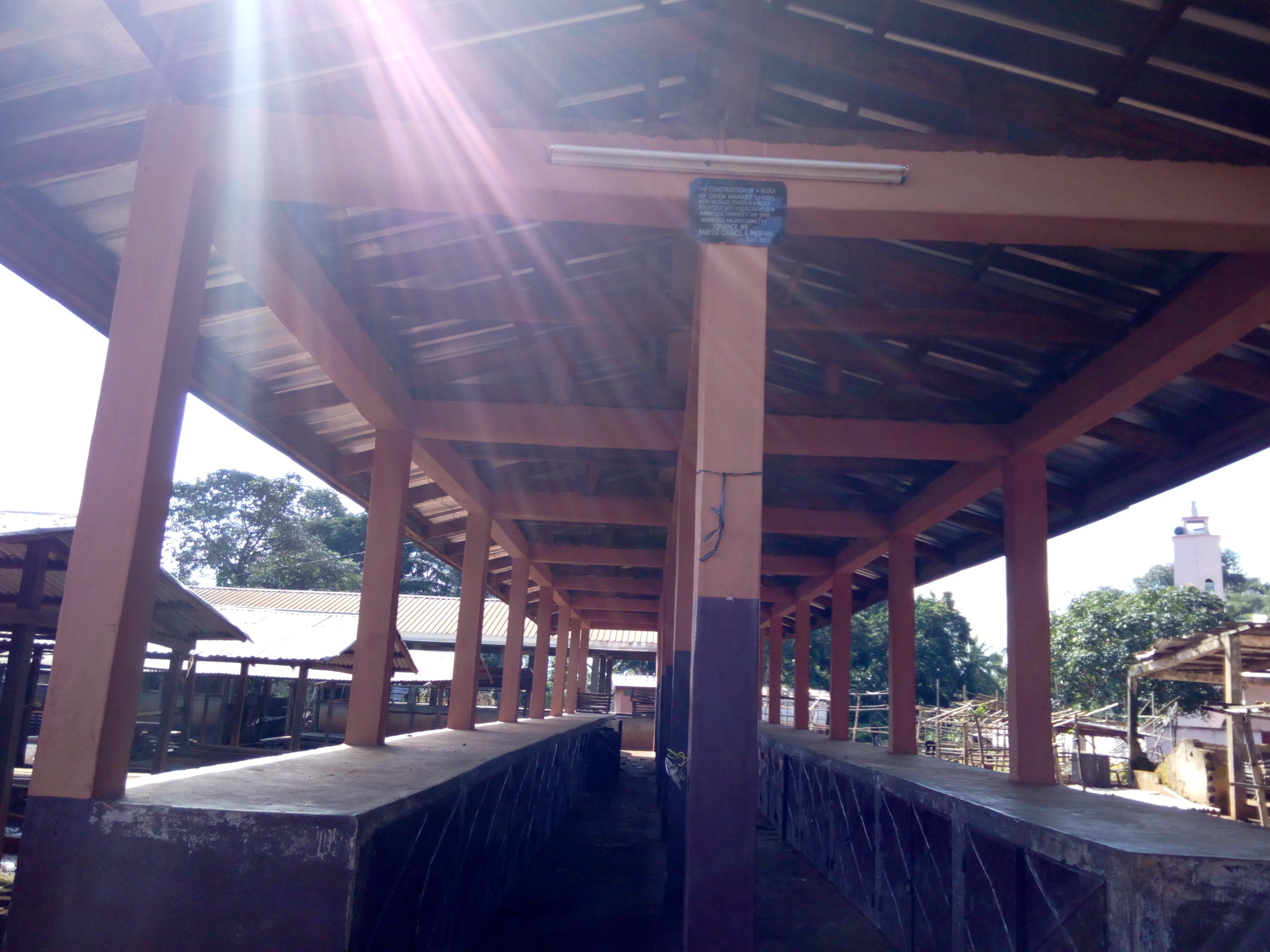
Babessi Market

Babessi is one of the four villages that make up the Babessi Sub-Division, and the Babessi Sub-Division is one of three sub-divisions of Ngoketunjia Division of the North West Region of Cameroon with a population of 26,802.

== Habitat and wildlife ==
The vegetation is savannah type with short stunted trees, palm trees, raffia palms, eucalyptus, kola and Pygeum africanum. They are of economic value to the inhabitants who used them for construction, fuel, food and as medicine. Some of these medicinal plants are even exported.

== See also ==
- Communes of Cameroon

== 2012 floods ==
In 2012, floods rendered some over 26 families homeless.
