= Bangulan =

Bangolan
- Location within Cameroon
- Country: Cameroon
- Region: Northwest
- Department: Ngo-Ketunjia
- Elevation: 1,138 m (3,734 ft)

Population (2005)
  - Total: 10,022
- (Census)
- Time zone: UTC+1 (WAT)

Bangolan village is one of the four villages that make up Babessi sub division and one of the thirteen villages of Ngoketunjia division of the North West region of Cameroon. Since 2016, Bangolan village have been flooded with armed forces following the dethronement of their Fon (traditional ruler) and villagers have since been deserting the village.

== See also ==
- Communes of Cameroon
