= Baba I =

Baba I (PAPIACKUM)
- Location within Cameroon
- Coordinates: 6°3′44″N 10°29′25″E
- Country: Cameroon
- Region: Northwest
- Department: Ngo-Ketunjia
- Elevation: 1,138 m (3,734 ft)

Population (2005)
  - Total: 45,000
- (Census)
- Time zone: UTC+1 (WAT)

Baba I village (Papiakum) is one of the four villages that make up Babessi subdivision and one of the thirteen villages of Ngoketunjia division of the North West region of Cameroon. Baba I village is located along the ring road from Bamenda some 58 km away from Bamenda town on the Bamenda-Nkambe stretch of the ring road just before one reaches Babessi town.

Baba 1 has one of the highest population density with a population of over 45000 After Bambalang village. The village is at present suffering from rural exodus, as most of the inhabitants have moved to big cities like Bamenda, Douala and Yaounde.

On 14 September 2015, heavy rain caused flooding in Baba I, leaving residents homeless. A representative of the flood victims attributed the damage to the lack of a drainage system on the stretch of road linking Jakiri and Kumbo. Relief items and funds worth about FCFA 13 million were delivered to victims by a delegation that included contributions from Prime Minister Philemon Yang.

Babessi Council has funded infrastructure projects in Baba I, including a health centre and the electrification of the Konyiart quarter.

Fon Fuekemshi II, who had ruled Baba I since 1989, was reported missing in May 2023. His nine-year-old son, Fon Fue Nghaper II, was presented to the public as his successor on 13 May 2023.

On sartuday 13 May 2023, in the presence of administrative and traditional authorities, the entire World witnessed the images and videos of the enthronement of the youngest Fon in 2023..His name is FUE KANGHAPER II, at the age of 9 he replaced his father FUEKEMSHI II.

FUE NKANGHAPER takes over a village of over 45000 inhabitants in the heart of the anglophone crisis that has ravaged the lives of over 5000 persons (military and civilians)..

Ref: (Triyah SWEBU LEBOH, Leadership and sustainability, University of Cumbria London.)

== See also ==
- Communes of Cameroon
