= Bangourain =

Coordinates: 5.8723°N 10.6750°E

- Commune and town
- Interactive map of Bangourain
- Country: Cameroon
- District: BaNgurain
- Time zone: UTC+1 (WAT)

Bangourain is a town and commune in Cameroon.

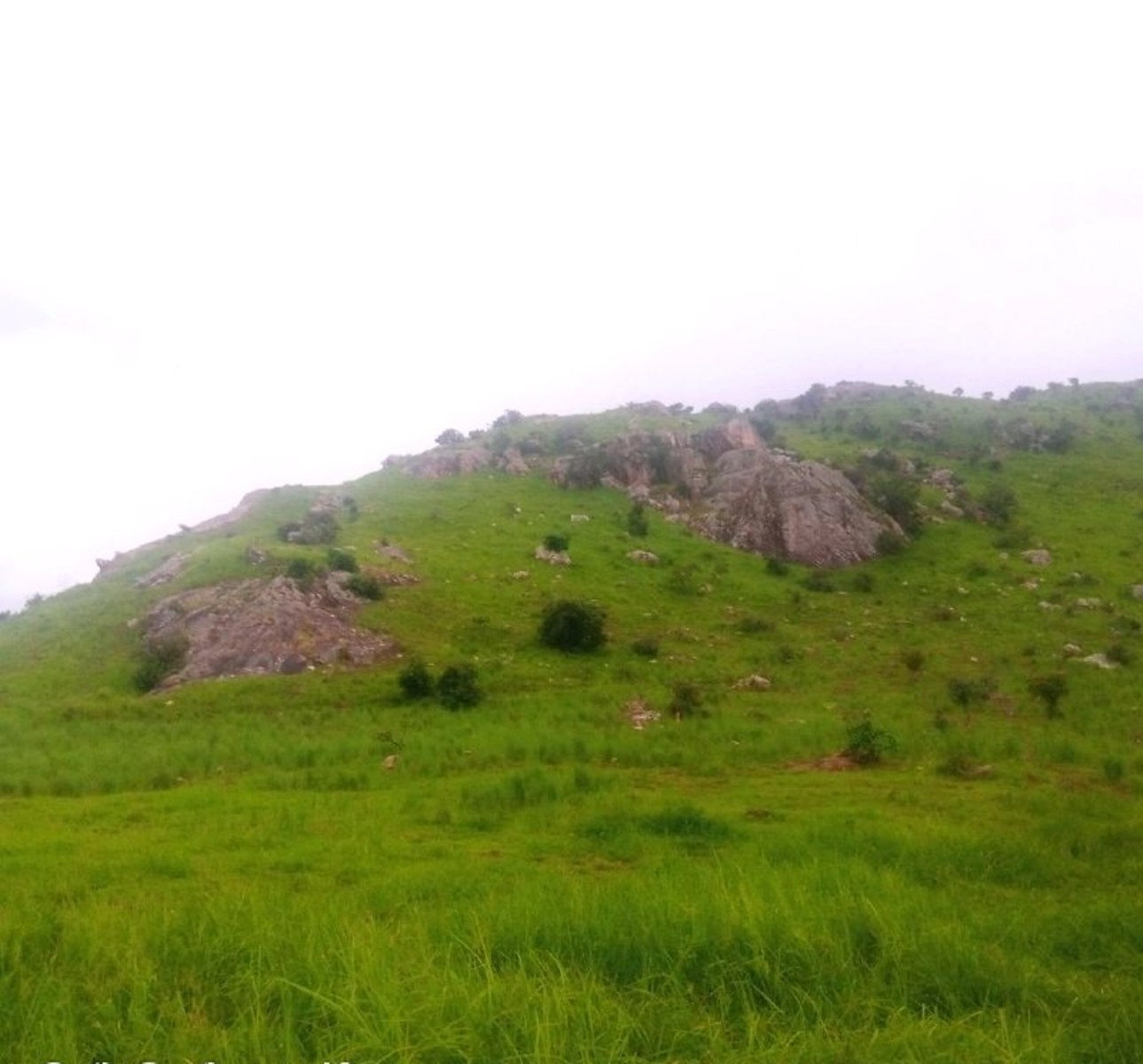
Massif rocailleux verdoyant - Bangourain (Ouest Cameroun)

== See also ==
- Communes of Cameroon
