= Babessi =

Coordinates: 6°01′N 10°34′E

- Commune and town
- Interactive map of Babessi
- Country: Cameroon
- Time zone: UTC+1 (WAT)

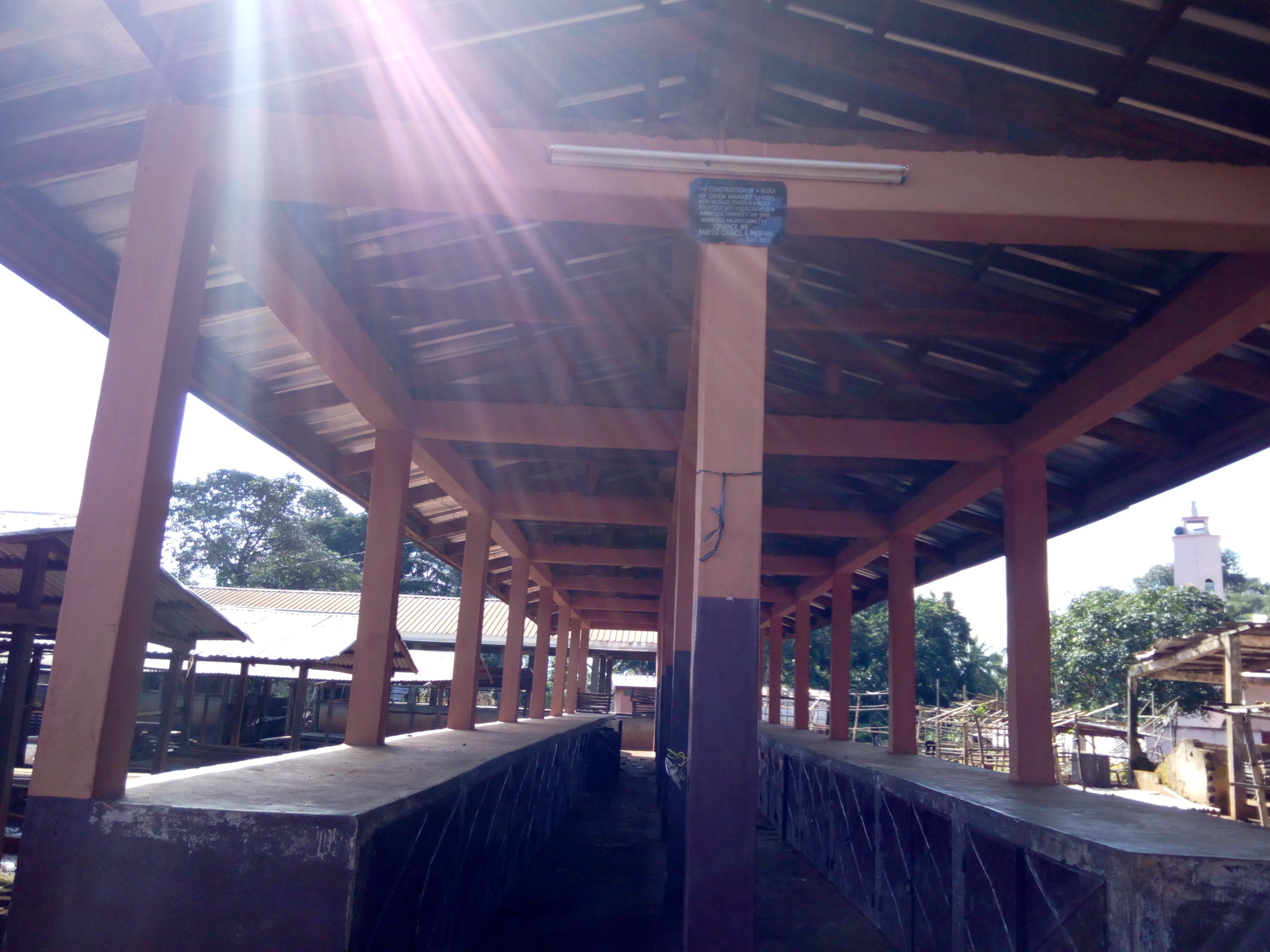

Babessi is a town and commune in Cameroon.

It comprises 4 villages :

- Babessi (village)
- Babungo (village)
- Bangulan
- Baba I

== See also ==
- Communes of Cameroon
