= Muyuka =

Town in Southwest Province, Cameroon

- Location in Cameroon
- Coordinates: 4°43′18″N 9°38′27″E
- Country: Cameroon
- Province: Southwest Province
- Division: Fako Division
- Elevation: 305 m (1,001 ft)

Population (2012)
  - Total: 34,296

Muyuka is a town in the Fako Division on the Southwest Province of Cameroon. It is originally home to members of the Balong tribe, but over the years Muyuka has expanded. It is the headquarters for sub villages and towns such as Owe, Ekata, Bafia, Muyenge, Yoke, Malende, Meanja and Mpundo.

== History ==
Muyuka had suffered from the German and British colonial masters especially during the period of slavery and slave trade. This is one of the areas in Cameroon where slavery and slave trade was intense.

== Education ==
Muyuka is home to popular educational establishments such as FESS Technical and Commercial College (FETECOL), Vocational College of Arts, Science and Technology (VOCAST), Government Bilingual High School (GBHS), Efuetngu Memorial comprehensive College and Government Technical High School (GTHS) of Muyuka. It used to be host of the Electricity Corporation (POWERCAM) in the days of the Federal Cameroon before it became the United Republic of Cameroon in 1972.

== Religion ==
With regard to religion, churches such as the Roman Catholic Mission, the Presbyterian Church, the Full Gospel Mission, Apostolic Church, the Baptist Church, and the Muslim Mosque, are the dominant places of worship in Muyuka.

== Politics ==
Politically, Muyuka used to be a stronghold of the chief opposition party, the Social Democratic Front (SDF) since 1990 but it later fell into the hands of the ruling CPDM during the past few years.

== Geography ==
Ecologically, the soil in Muyuka is of a rich volcanic nature (black), because Muyuka is located at the foot of Mount Cameroon, known for its volcanic nature.

== Demographics ==
Although the indigenes are the Balongs, there is a significant population of the Bangwas from Lebialem Division who have migrated to Muyuka, engaged in agriculture and politics. Muyuka can boast of supplying a significant quantify of foodstuff and tertiary crops like cocoa and coffee into the local market.

== Features ==
There are a good number of state institutions in Muyuka like the Divisional Office, the Police, the Gendarmerie, a Government Hospital, a post office, the Court of First Instance (commonly known as a Magistrate's Court), a Legal Department, and most if not all of the Ministries. These office are not far away from one another since Muyuka is a small town along the Kumba-Douala road.

The private sector includes local banks, such as a community bank known as MC2.

== Sports ==
Muyuka is home to football clubs like Aljazeera Soccer Academy who play in the Southwest Regional League, Ekona United
