= Bamali =

- Location within Cameroon
- Coordinates: 5°57′9″N 10°26′15″E
- Country: Cameroon
- Region: Northwest
- Department: Ngo-Ketunjia
- Elevation: 1,138 m (3,734 ft)

Population (2005)
  - Total: 7,690
- (Census)
- Time zone: UTC+1 (WAT)

Bamali village is one of the four villages that make up Ndop Central sub division and one of the thirteen villages of Ngoketunjia division of the North West region of Cameroon. Bamali village is located partly along the ring road from Bamenda some 40 km away from Bamenda town on the Bamenda-Nkambe stretch of the ring road just before reaching Bamunka (Ndop town).

Since 2009, the village of Bamali have had chieftain problems following the dethronement of the then Fon, Idriss Nopu Ndouafoua II. The decision to dethrone him was taken by the Ngumba secret society and a new Fon presented to the public. Some of the reasons for Fon Ndouafoua's dethronement, as cited by the Ngumba member, include violation of Bamali tradition and culture, seizure and sale of land, grabbing of people's wives and his unilateral dismissal of village notables.

Administrative authorities have however since refused to recognize the newly enthroned Fon thereby leaving Bamali Village without a Fon or in other words with two Fons, one who lives in the Palace with the population in the village and another who was dethroned, and lives out of the village but is recognized by the administration.

== History ==
Mangeh villages believe that Mangeh had five children, two sons (Tuningmungwa and Chengfong) and three daughters (Byiae, Vhenji and Mekheng). The eldest Tunigmungwa succeeded their father and formed Bambalang while his brother Chengfong established the Bamunka village whereas Byiae formed Bamali, Vhenji formed Bafanji and Mekheng the Bamunkumbit village. Bambalang and Bamunka were descendants of the males (sons of Mangeh) while Bafanji, Bamunkumbit and Bamali are the descendants of the daughters. These five villages have formed the Mangeh Family Association to maintain peace and unity amongst themselves to ensure progress of all. These villages have no defined boundary between them because they know that they are one. Mangeh branches are found all over the country and abroad. supporting a population of 20.863 people.

== Education ==
There are several educational institutions including government owned, privately owned and denominational ranging from nursery, primary through secondary and high schools.

== Politics ==
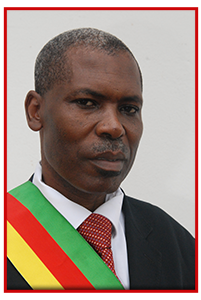
Questeur NJINGUM MUSA MBUTOH

In 2007 Bamali village saw themselves going away with the juiciest political positions in Ngoketunajia North Constituency thanks to Njingum Musa Mbotuh (a computer engineer) who won the lone parliamentary seat for the constituency. His savoir-faire was also rewarded in the national assembly when he was elected to be one of four Questors in the national assembly of Cameroon and he was recently elected to chair the Monetary and Financial Affairs committee of the legislative arm of the African union, the PAN African parliament. Hon. Njingum Musa was born on 1 January 1960 in Bamali village, Ndop central sub division, Ngoketunjia Division of North-West Region.
