= Ndop, Cameroon =

Ndop Bamunka
- Nicknames: Nka, Munka
- Location in Cameroon
- Coordinates: 6°00′N 10°25′E
- Country: Cameroon
- Region: Northwest
- Department: Ngo-Ketunjia
- Elevation: 1,220 m (4,000 ft)

Population (2012)
  - Total: 30,467
- Time zone: UTC+1 (WAT)

Ndop is a town and a commune in the northwest of Cameroon.

It comprises four villages:

- Bambalang (village)
- Bamali
- Bamessing
- Bamunka

== See also ==
- Communes of Cameroon
