= Ngo-Ketunjia =

- Department
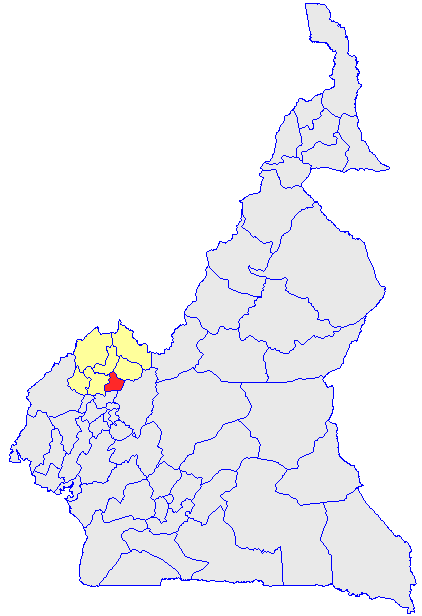
- Department location in Cameroon
- Country: Cameroon
- Province: Northwest Province
- Capital: Ndop

Area
  - Total: 435 sq mi (1,126 km^{2})

Population (2005)
  - Total: 187,348
- Time zone: UTC+1 (WAT)

Ngo-Ketunjia is a department of Northwest Province in Cameroon. The department covers an area of 1,126 km^{2} (435 sq mi) and as of 2005 had a total population of 187,348. The capital of the department lies at Ndop.

== Subdivisions ==
The Division is divided administratively into 5 Subdivisions and in turn into villages.

=== Subdivisions ===
Ngo-ketunjia, has 5 subdivisions; the headquarters lies at Ndop-Bamunka

- Bangourain
- Galim

District	Capital	Area (km^{2})
Ndop-Yakum	Ndop	197.4
Balikumbat	Balikumbat	337.2
Babessi	Babessi	372.6
