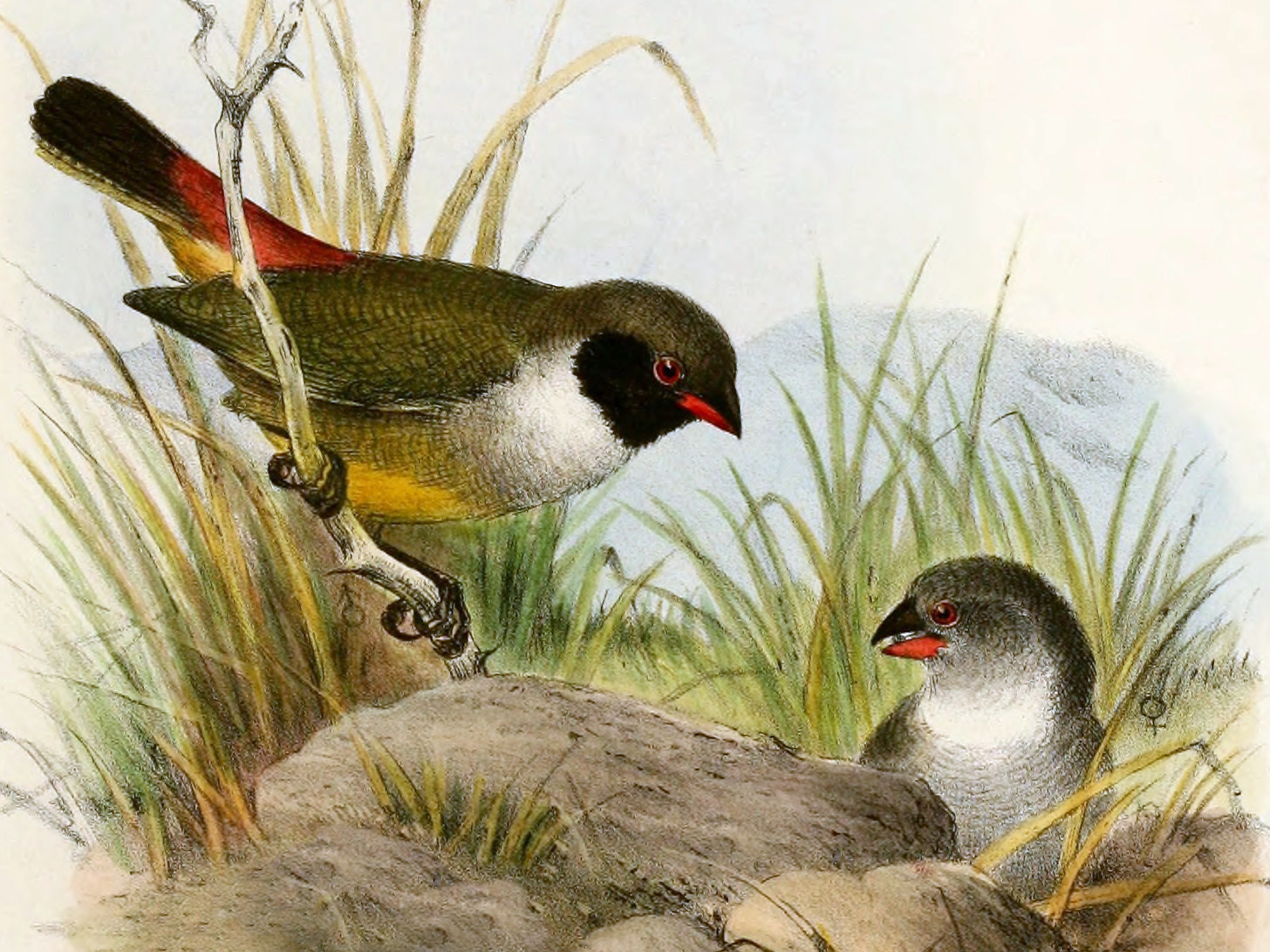

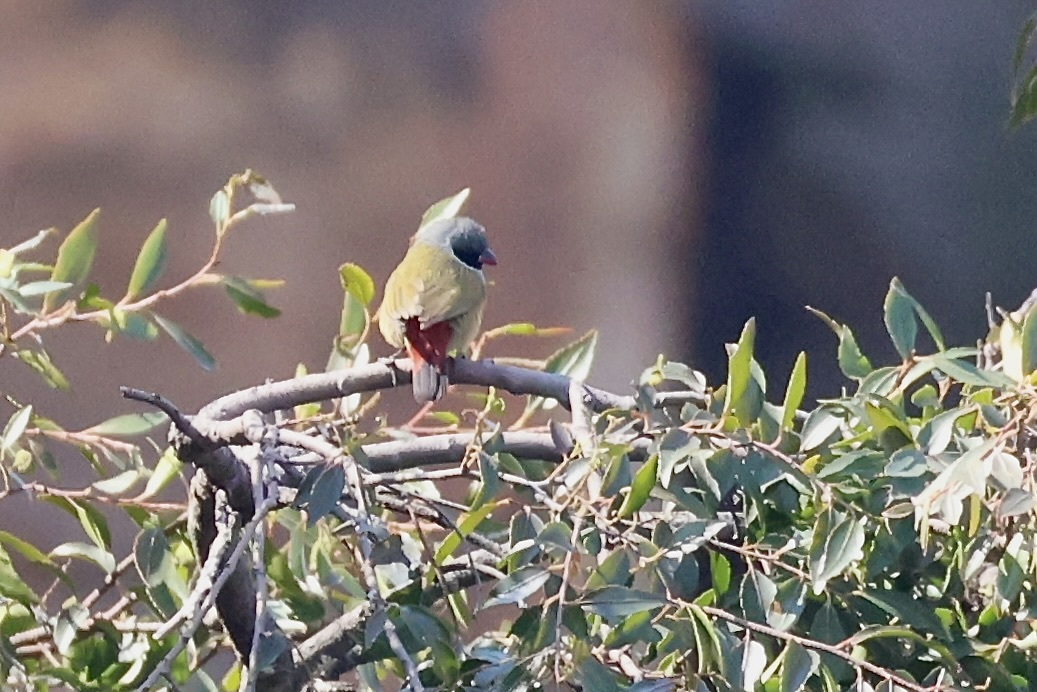

Conservation status
- Least Concern (IUCN 3.1)

Scientific classification
- Kingdom: Animalia
- Phylum: Chordata
- Class: Aves
- Order: Passeriformes
- Family: Estrildidae
- Genus: Coccopygia
- Species: C. bocagei

Binomial name
- Coccopygia bocagei Shelley, 1903

Synonyms
- Coccopygia melanotis bocagei

= Angola waxbill =

Species of bird

The Angola waxbill (Coccopygia bocagei) is a species of estrildid finch endemic to western Angola. Some taxonomists consider it to be conspecific with the swee waxbill (Coccopygia melanotis) of the south and east of South Africa; it differs from this in the yellowish belly and undertail coverts, rather than grey as in the swee waxbill.

It is 9–10 cm long, with a grey crown and pale grey breast, grading into the yellow belly. As in swee waxbill, the back and wings are olive-green, the rump is bright red, and the tail black. Males have a black throat, and females a pale grey throat. The bill is bicoloured, black on the upper mandible, and red on the lower mandible. The iris is brown, and the legs dark grey.
