= Nchokonn =

Nchokonn Nchukun
- Village
- Country: Cameroon
- Region: Northwest Region
- Department: Donga-Mantung
- Time zone: UTC+1 (WAT)

Nchokonn, formerly Nchukun is a village in Cameroon located in the Donga-Mantung département and the North-West Region, on the border with Nigeria. It is part of the Nwa commune.

== The people ==
Nchukun has a dozen households where the majority of the population lives. It is one of the few localities where Dzodinka, a southern Bantoid language of the Eastern Grassfields languages grouping is spoken. The majority of the inhabitants belong to the Mfumte clan.

== The economy ==
It is known in the area for its local maize market, which supplies neighbouring localities. Maize, including those from Nchokonn are of little importance for trade within Cameroon, with US$55.000 worth of it being exported every year, mainly to China. Raising cattle is also an important activity in the Nchokon village.

== The infrastructure ==
There are major infrastructure problems in Nchokonn. Road conditions are poor, there is no health center, only recently a school have been built. There is limited access to sanitary drinking water in Adere, and droughts are common in the region. The inhabitants of the village must therefore obtain their supplies from water points which could contain pathogens and other products harmful to health, despite the fact that there is no health center in the village. Nchokonn is also, like all the other villages in Nwa, is not electrified.

== The climate ==
It has a dry climate.
