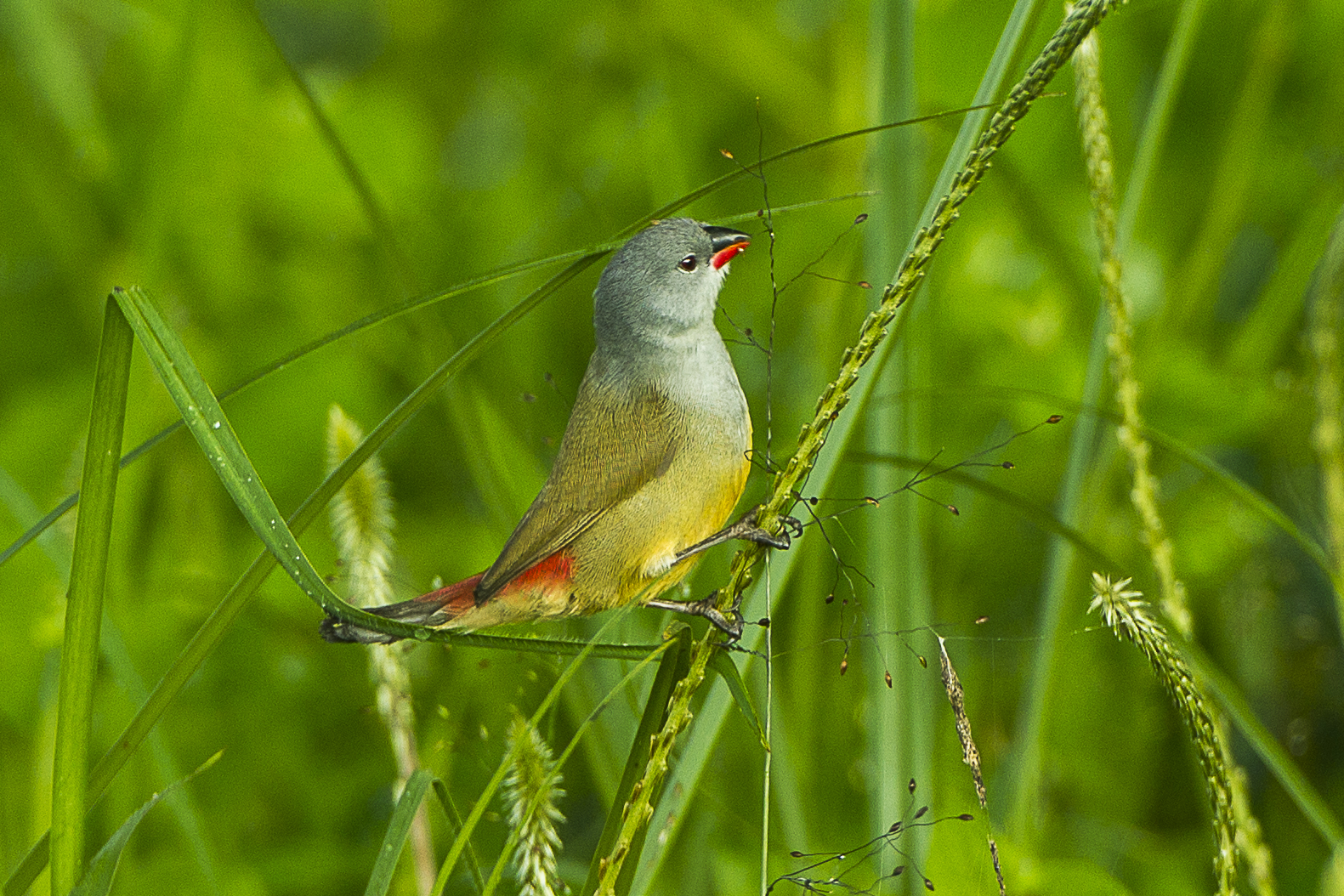

Conservation status
- Least Concern (IUCN 3.1)

Scientific classification
- Kingdom: Animalia
- Phylum: Chordata
- Class: Aves
- Order: Passeriformes
- Family: Estrildidae
- Genus: Coccopygia
- Species: C. quartinia

Binomial name
- Coccopygia quartinia (Bonaparte, 1850)

Synonyms
- Estrilda quartinia

= Yellow-bellied waxbill =

Species of bird

The yellow-bellied waxbill (Coccopygia quartinia) is a species of estrildid finch native to East Africa. The bird is now named yellow-bellied swee.

It breeds in east central and south-eastern Africa. Some taxonomists consider it to be conspecific with the swee waxbill.
