= Misaje =

- Commune and town
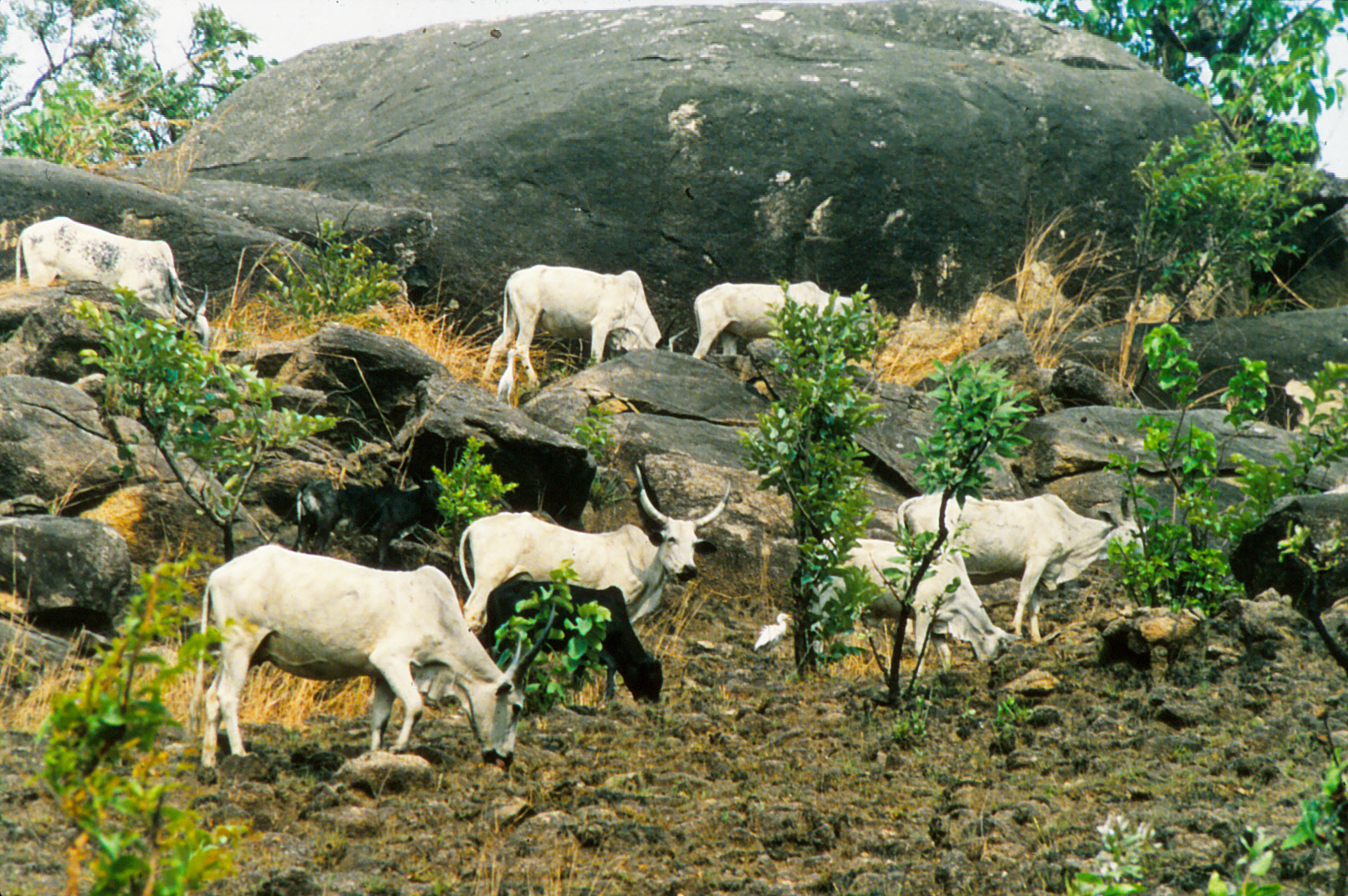
- Along the Ring Road between Misaje and Nkambe

- Location in Cameroon
- Coordinates: 6°35′N 10°33′E
- Country: Cameroon
- Region: Northwest
- Department: Donga-Mantung
- Time zone: UTC+1 (WAT)

Misaje is a town and commune in Donga-Mantung department in the Northwest Region of Cameroon. The town lies at the top of the Ring Road, about 15 kilometers west of Nkambé, where the Ring Road meets the road north to Dumbu and the border with Nigeria.

The name Misaje comes from a Hausa nickname for a bearded man who sold food and rented rooms to kola traders on their way to and from Takum. The village containing his stop came to be called Misaje and the name was later applied to the whole commune.

Different local dialects predominate in different parts of the subdivision. Ncane is spoken from Misaje south. Nsari is spoken around Kamine and Akweto. Kemezung is spoken in Dumbu and Kwei. Bebe is spoken around Bebe-Jama and Bebe-Jatto. Mungong is spoken at Mungong. All mentioned so far are similar, grouped by linguists as Eastern Beboid languages. More distantly related, Jukun is spoken to the north around Gidan-Jikum.

Misaje commune was created in 1992, with headquarters at the town of Misaje, and including the villages Nkanchi, Dumbu, Kamine, Bansobi, Akweto, Bebe-Kete, Mayo-Kila, Bebe-Jato, Sabon-gida, Bem, Chunghe, Kibbo, Kwe, Mbissa, Mfume and Chako. Terrain varies from rugged in the east around Mount Kinka to a flat plain around the Dumbo Ranch in the west. The Dumbo Ranch is a parastatal project aimed at improving beef production using modern techniques. The total population of Misaje commune is about 40,000. Many people live by farming maize, cassava, groundnuts, beans, yams, potatoes, sweet potatoes, cabbage, carrots and okra. Some raise cattle. Some trade, hunt and fish. some of the relief features in this commune include mount kigure situated between bansobi and akweto, this commune is also made up of rivers such as (river kinteh) situated in the moh quarter under Kamine, there’s also the (Moh waterfall) there’s (river Kimbeng) which flows down to through kimbi

== See also ==
- Communes of Cameroon
