= Adere =

Adere Ader
- Village
- Interactive map of Adere
- Coordinates: 6°50′N 10°52′E
- Country: Cameroon

Population (2005)
  - Total: 1,869
- Time zone: UTC+0 (GMT)

Adere (or Ader) is a village in Cameroon in the department of Donga-Mantung and in the Northwest Region, near the Cameroon-Nigeria border. It is part of the Nwa commune
