= Nkambé =

Nkambe
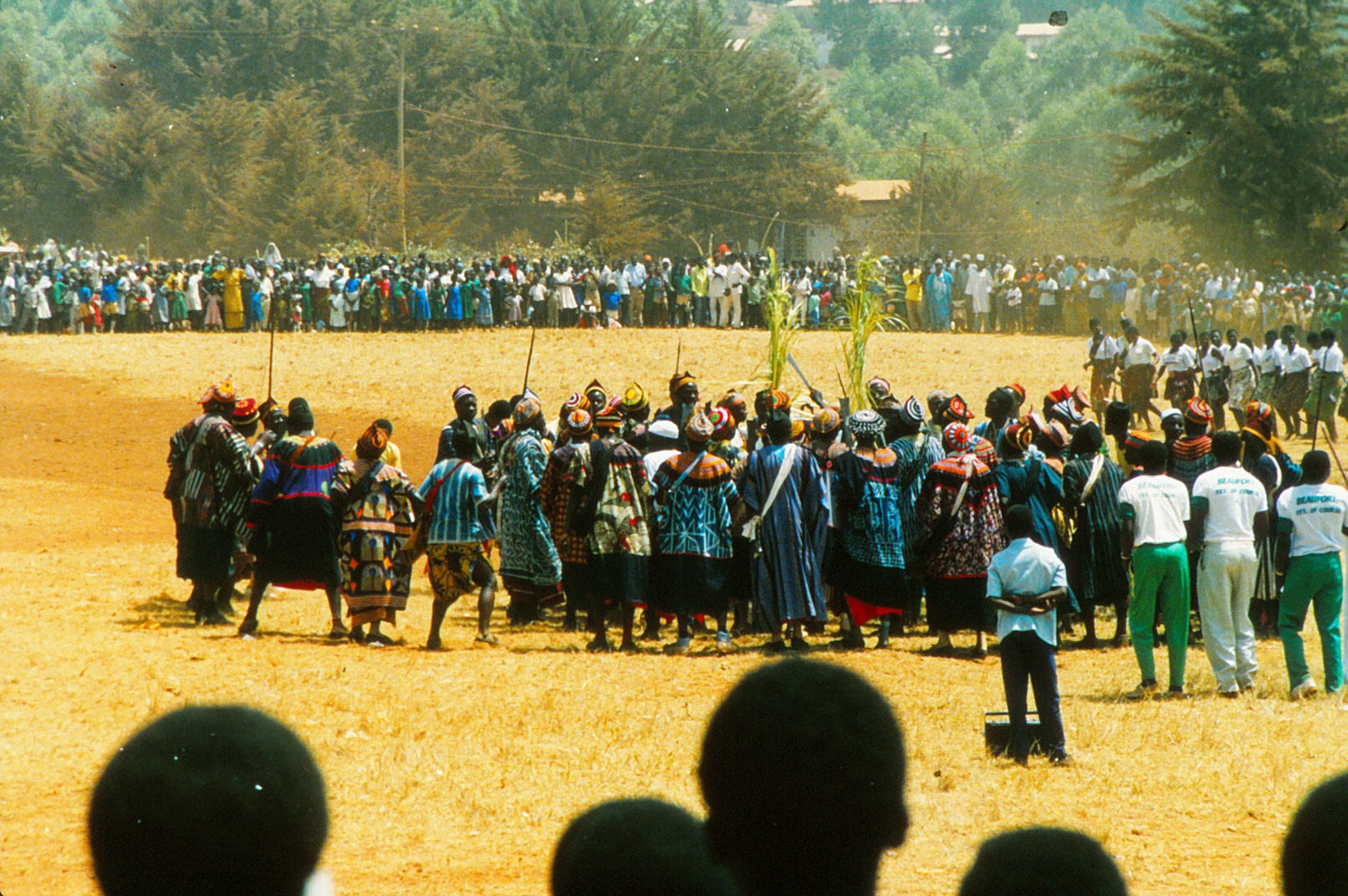
- Traditional dance display in Nkambe-town, around 1990 in dry season

- Location in Cameroon
- Coordinates: 6°38′N 10°40′E
- Country: Cameroon
- Region: Northwest Region
- Division (County): Mantungia

Population (2001)
  - Total: 292,900
- Time zone: UTC+1 (WAT)
- Climate: Cwb

Nkambe is a city in the Northwest Region of Cameroon. It is the headquarters of the Mantungia department. Nkambe Central is also the name of one of the five communes in Donga-Mantung. Nkambe lies at the north edge of the Bamenda Grassfields, on the northeast arc of the Ring Road, farthest from Bamenda. The Nigerian border is only 25 or 40 km away, but roads toward the border are undeveloped jungle tracks.

The Chua Chua Botanical Gardens, established by Farmer Tantoh, are a popular attraction in Nkambe.

== People ==
Most of the people in Nkambe Central commune are Wimbum - the three clans which speak the Limbum language. Nkambe Central contains the northwest part of Wimbum-land, including the villages of Kungi, Konchep, Binshua, Bih, Saah, Wat, Nwangri, Mbaa, Kup, Chup, Bongom, Mbot, Tabenken, Njap/Ngie Binka, Binjeng, and Nkambe-town. Ndu Commune contains the southeast part of Wimbum-land. Most Wimbum are farmers, raising maize, beans, njama-njama, Irish potatoes, cocoyams, plantains, bananas, etc. Scattered Fulani also live in the district, grazing cattle on the grasslands. The population of Nkambe Central was estimated around 170,000 in 2011.

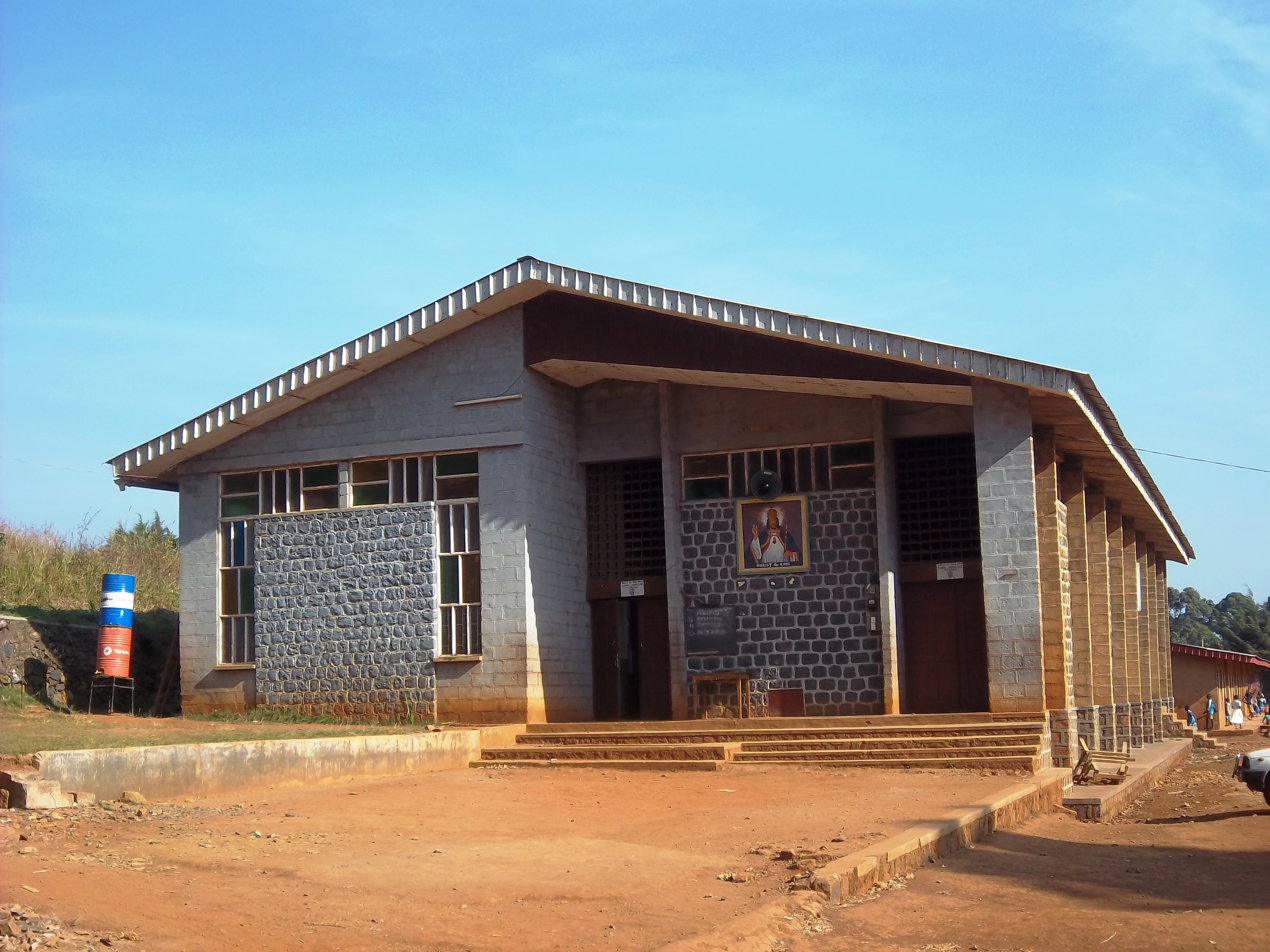
Church under construction

Nkambe-town, long an administrative center, has attracted a more cosmopolitan mix than the surrounding villages, including Hausa traders, students from around Donga-Mantung, and civil servants from other parts of Cameroon. The town has a daily market, a government hospital, various schools, churches, a mosque, gas pumps, a gendarmerie, and administrative offices.

Images of Njap and Bih Villages

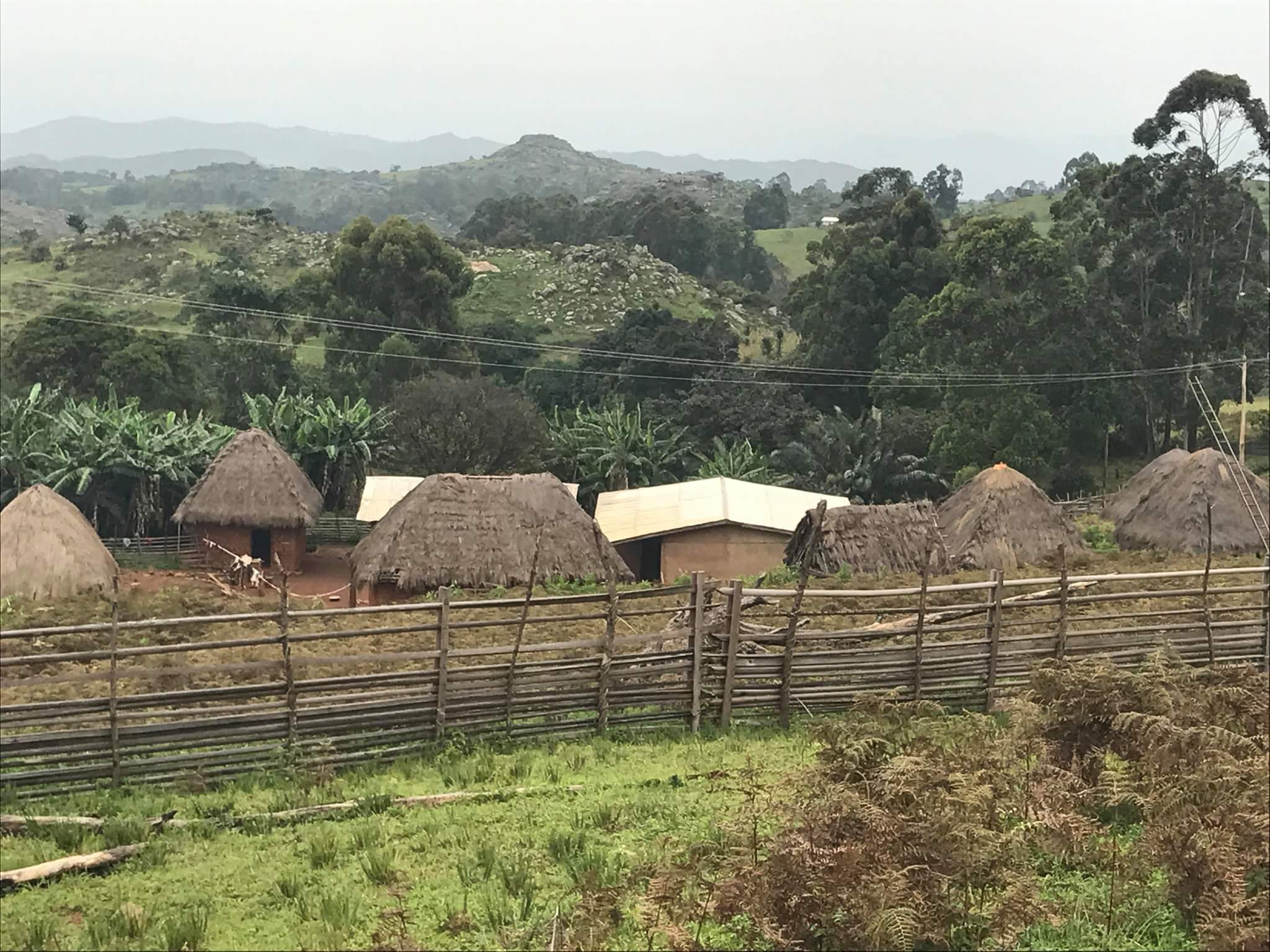
Settlement area, Njap

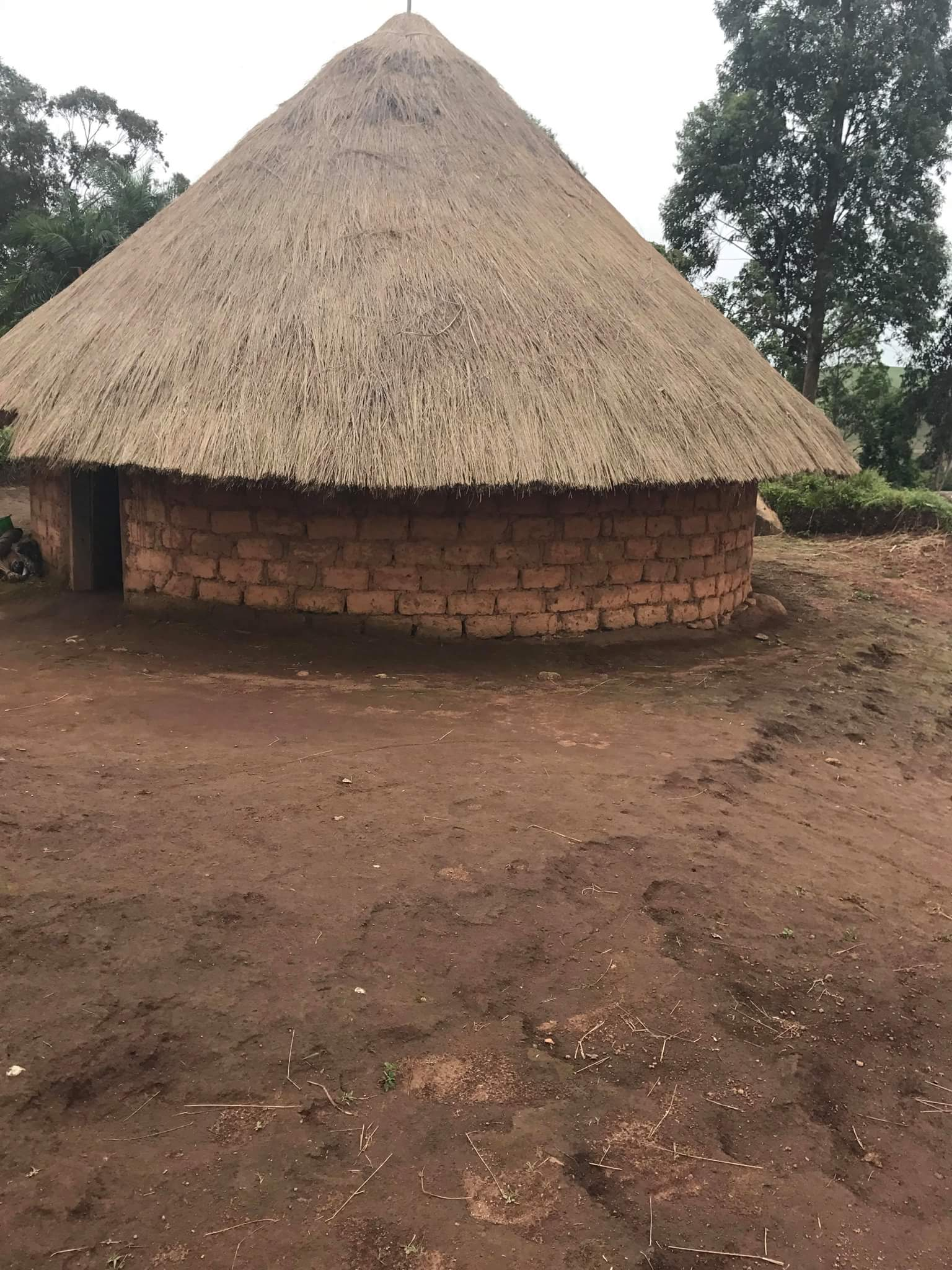
Traditional House in Njap Village

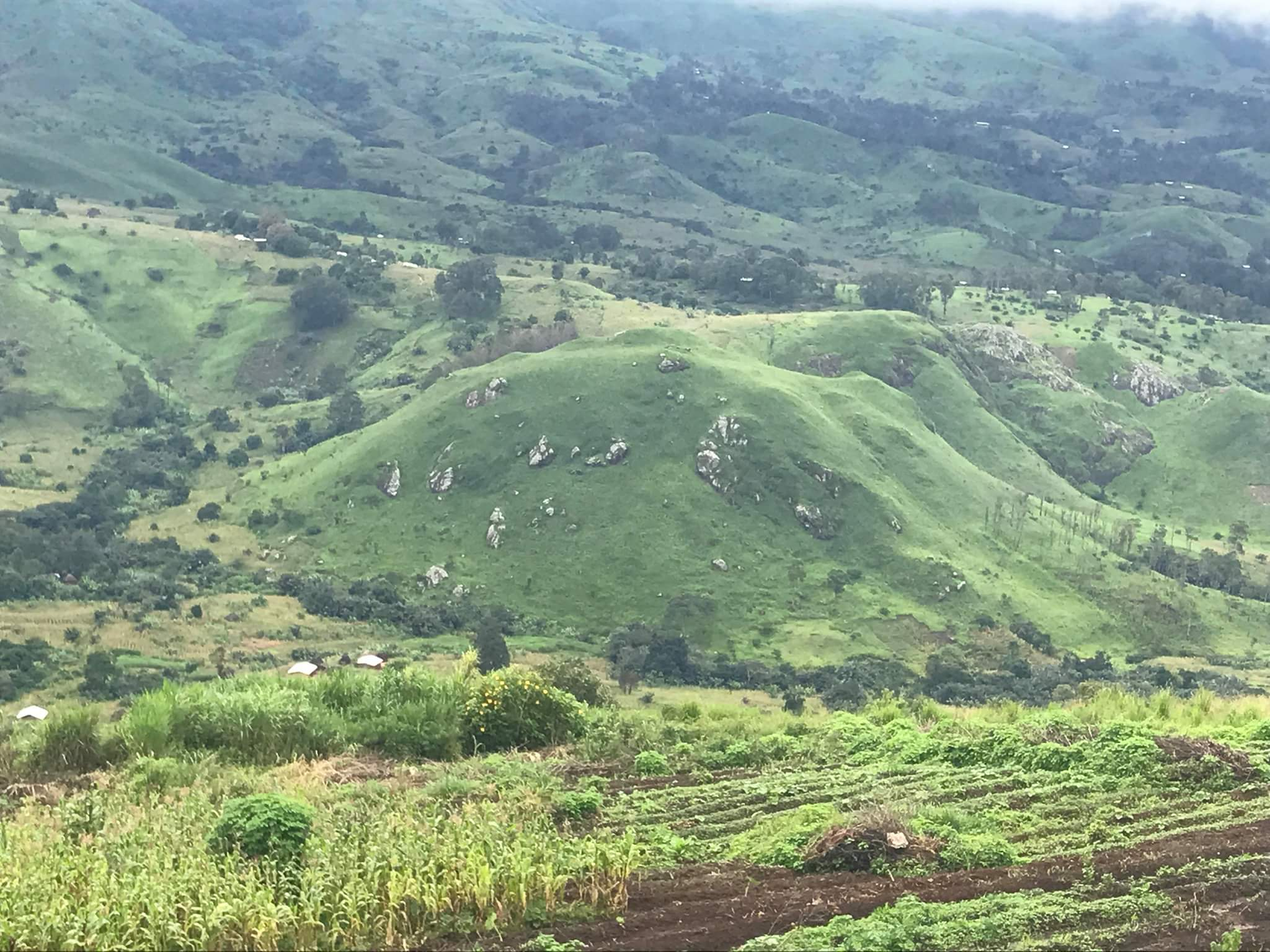
View of Hills and Farm land in Njap

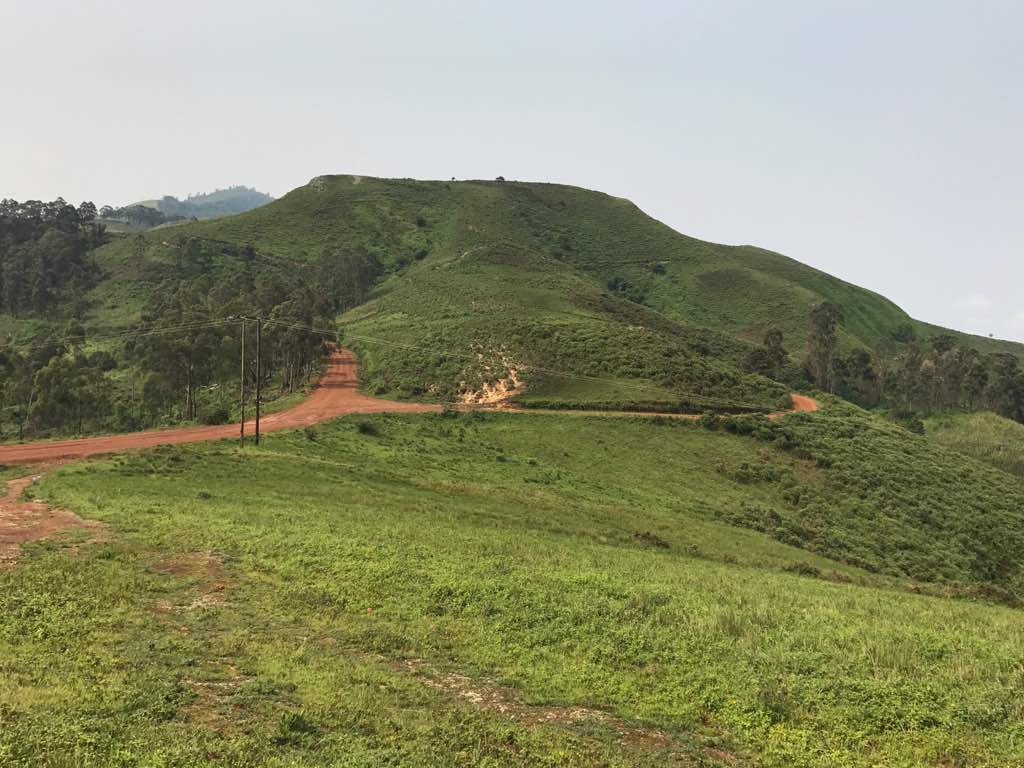
Road to Bih settlement area

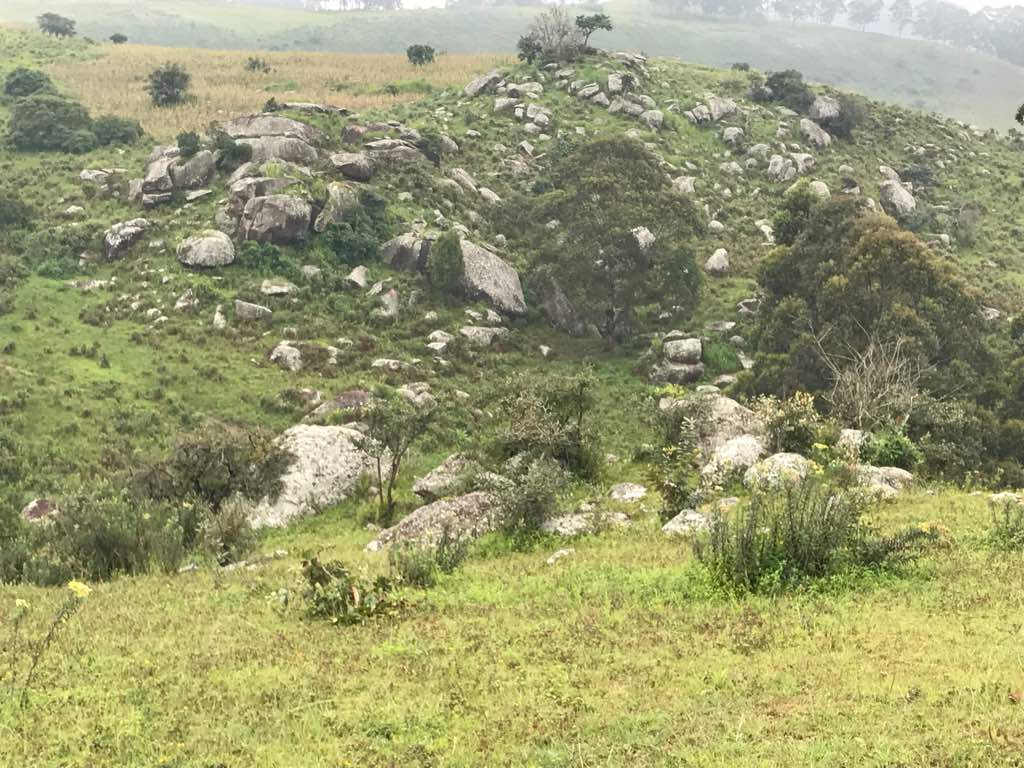
Rocks in Bih Village

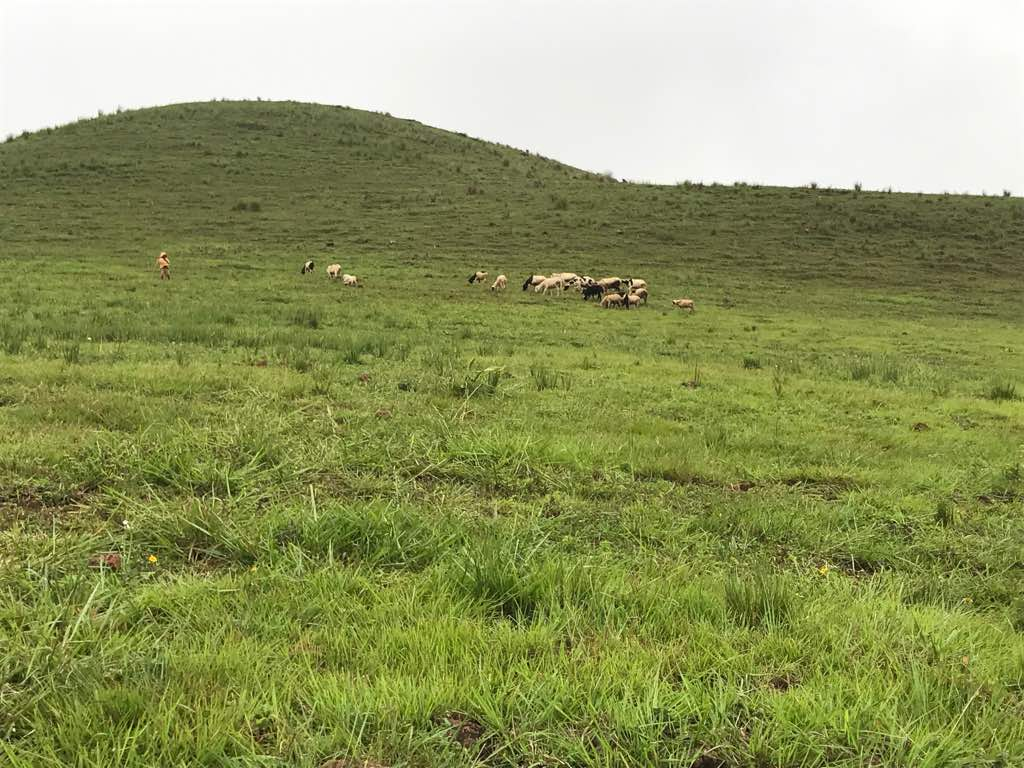
Cattle grazing land, Bih

== Terrain ==
As mentioned above, Nkambe lies in the Bamenda Grassfields, in the chain of highlands that runs from São Tomé up into Nigeria. The land varies from cool grassy highlands like the 2200m Mount Binka, to lower warmer places like Chup at 1500m.

Parts of Nkambe commune lie in the Cameroonian Highlands forests eco-region. Bird species include the Western green tinkerbird, the Yellow-spotted barbet, the Cameroon greenbul, the Yellow-breasted boubou, the African hill babbler, the Green longtail, the Fernando Po Oliveback, Bannerman's weaver, and perhaps Bannerman's turaco.

== History ==
The Wimbum probably arrived in this area between the 1700s and the mid-1800s. In the 1800s, the Nkambe area saw some trade in elephant ivory, but the area was bypassed by the major long-distance trade routes north through Fonfuka and east through Ntem. Lack of economic power and lack of unified leadership made it somewhat vulnerable to external attack, and the area suffered from slave raids more than larger, centralized kingdoms like Nso and Bamum.

German administration of the Grassfields began around 1901. Fulani herders began to arrive in the area around 1910. Britain took over in 1916 and in 1922 re-instituted some native law under the policy of indirect rule. In 1949 Nkambe-town became the head of one of the three administrative units in Bamenda Province, alongside Bamenda and Wum. Nkambe-town's administrative role has continued since independence in 1961.
