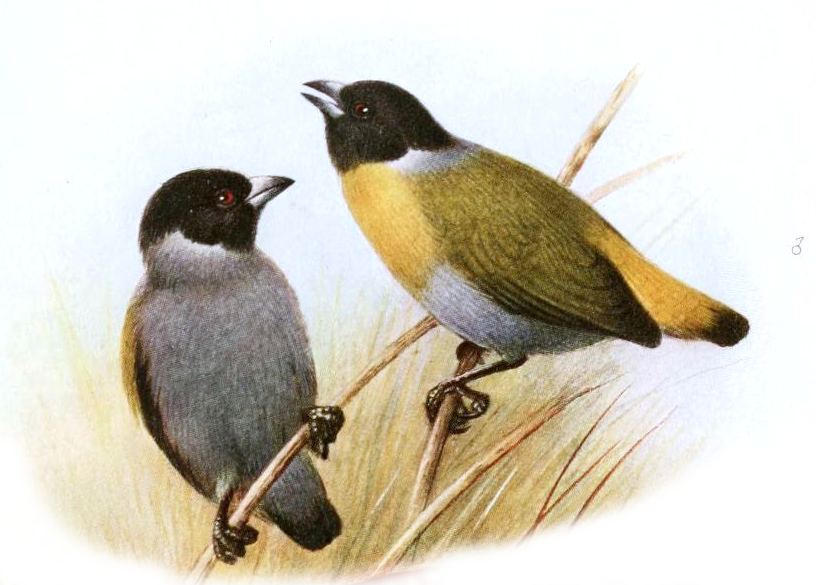

Scientific classification
- Kingdom: Animalia
- Phylum: Chordata
- Class: Aves
- Order: Passeriformes
- Family: Estrildidae
- Genus: Nesocharis; Alexander, 1903

Type species
- Nesocharis shelleyi Shelley's oliveback Alexander, 1903

Species
- See text

= Nesocharis =

Genus of birds

Nesocharis is a genus of small seed-eating birds in the family Estrildidae. They are found in Africa.

== Taxonomy ==
The genus Nesocharis was introduced in 1903 by the English anthropologist Boyd Alexander with Shelley's oliveback as the type species. The name Nesocharis is a combination of the Ancient Greek nēsos, meaning "island" and kharis, meaning "loveliness". The genus Nesocharis is sister to the waxbills in the genus Coccopygia.

=== Species ===
The genus contains the following two species:

Image	Scientific name	Common name	Distribution
	White-collared oliveback	Nesocharis ansorgei	Burundi, The Democratic Republic of the Congo, Rwanda, Tanzania & Uganda
	Shelley's oliveback	Nesocharis shelleyi	Bioko island, western Cameroon and adjacent Nigeria
