= Ako, Cameroon =

Ako
- Commune and town
- Location in Cameroon Ako (Africa)
- Country: Cameroon
- Region: Northwest
- Department: Donga-Mantung

Population (2005)
  - Total: 40,349
- Time zone: UTC+1 (WAT)

Ako is a town and commune in the Donga-Mantung department, Northwest Region of Cameroon. As of 2005 census, it had a population of 40,349.

== See also ==
- Communes of Cameroon
