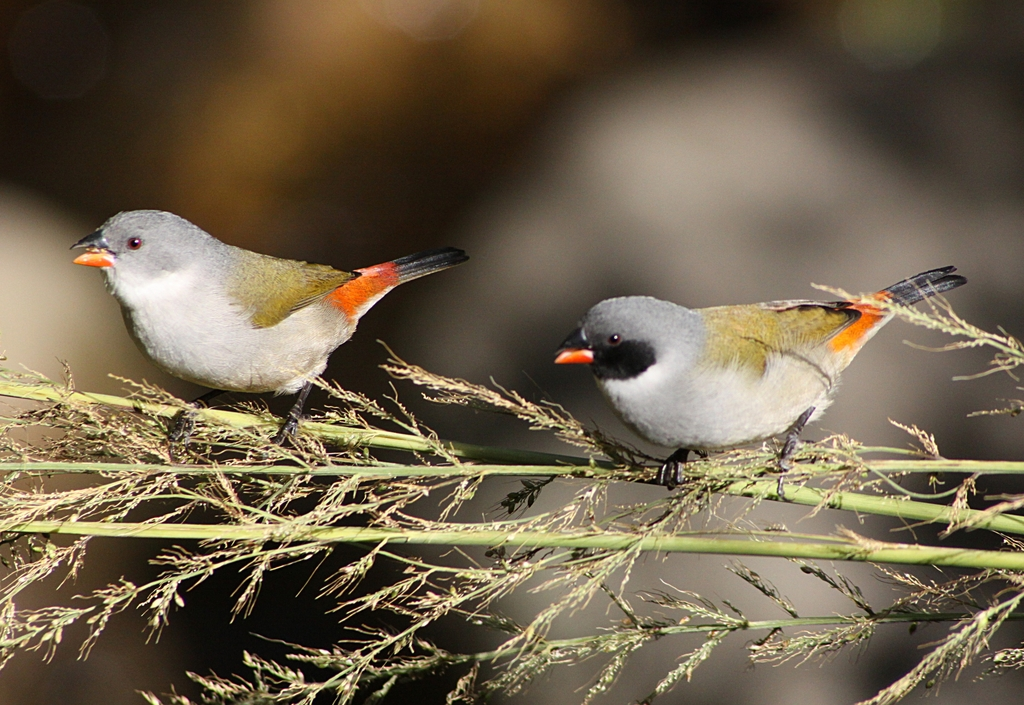
- Swee waxbill (Coccopygia melanotis)

Scientific classification
- Kingdom: Animalia
- Phylum: Chordata
- Class: Aves
- Order: Passeriformes
- Family: Estrildidae
- Subfamily: Estrildidae
- Genus: Coccopygia; Reichenbach, 1862

Type species
- Fringilla melanotis swee waxbill Temminck, 1823

Species
- Coccopygia quartinia Coccopygia melanotis Coccopygia bocagei

= Coccopygia =

Genus of birds

Coccopygia is a genus of small seed-eating birds in the family Estrildidae. They are distributed across central and southern Africa.

== Taxonomy ==
The genus Coccopygia was introduced in 1862 by the German naturalist Ludwig Reichenbach. The name combines the Ancient Greek kokkos meaning "scarlet" with -pugios meaning "-rumped". The type species was designated as the swee waxbill by Richard Bowdler Sharpe in 1890. The genus Coccopygia is sister to the olivebacks in the genus Nesocharis.

=== Species ===
The genus contains the following three species:

Image	Scientific name	Common name	Distribution
	Coccopygia quartinia	Yellow-bellied waxbill	East Africa
	Coccopygia melanotis	Swee waxbill	South and east of South Africa
	Coccopygia bocagei	Angola waxbill	Western Angola
