= Farmer Tantoh =

Cameroonian environmentalist (born 1978)

- Born: 1978 (age 47–48); Nkambé
- Occupation: environmentalist
- Notable work: Founder of the Save Your Future Association (SYFA)
- Awards: 2011 African Achievers Awards (Best Grassroots Environmentalist in Africa).; 2016 World Echoes (Best Environmentalist of the Year).; 2016 Marie-Claire Nabila Kuja Foundation Award.

Dieudonne Tantoh Nforba, better known as Farmer Tantoh (born 1978 in Nkambé) is a Cameroonian environmentalist and founder of the Save Your Future Association (SYFA).

== Biography ==
He received a scholarship to study Tropical Agriculture and Rural Development at the Regional College of Agriculture in Bambili (Mezam, Northwest Region) in 2002. His studies were interrupted by Typhoid fever as a result of drinking unclean water. This led him to specialize in Spring Water Catchment Protection and Agroforestry. He graduated as Senior Agricultural Technician (with Higher National Diploma) in 2004. In 2005 he founded the Save Your Future Association (SYFA), a nonprofit-environmental organization supported by national and international volunteers. Because of his work with SYFA he was invited to study watersheds in the United States and Russia by the Tahoe-Baikal Institute in 2007. In 2010 he received a scholarship from the United States Department of State, allowing him to graduate from the Northeast Wisconsin Technical College with a certificate of Sustainable Organic Farming Practices and Horticulture in 2011. Farmer Tantoh was elected Ashoka fellow in 2012 and Forest Nation ambassador in 2015. He was also among the finalists for the 2016 Africa Youth Awards. Publication of a nonfiction picture book entitled I Am Farmer, chronicling Farmer Tantoh's life, is slated for spring 2019 by Millbrook Press.

== Awards ==
- 2011 African Achievers Awards (Best Grassroots Environmentalist in Africa)
- 2011 International Green Apple Award (Environmental Best Practice And Sustainable Development, Gold Winner Africa)
- 2016 World Echoes (Best Environmentalist of the Year)
- 2016 Marie-Claire Nabila Kuja Foundation Award

== Publications ==
- Farmer Tantoh (July 2006). "Save Your Future Association" (PDF). Mountain Forum Bulletin. VI (2): 29–30. ISSN 1029-3760.
- Farmer Tantoh (January 2007). "Chua-Chua Botanical Gardens" (PDF). Mountain Forum Bulletin. VII (1): 30–31. ISSN 1029-3760.
- Farmer Tantoh (January 2008). "Summer Environmental Exchange (SEE) 2007" (PDF). Mountain Forum Bulletin. VIII (1): 29–30. ISSN 1029-3760.
- Farmer Tantoh (July 2008). "Conflict in the Kugha Watershed" (PDF). Mountain Forum Bulletin. VIII (2): 15–16. ISSN 1815-2139.
