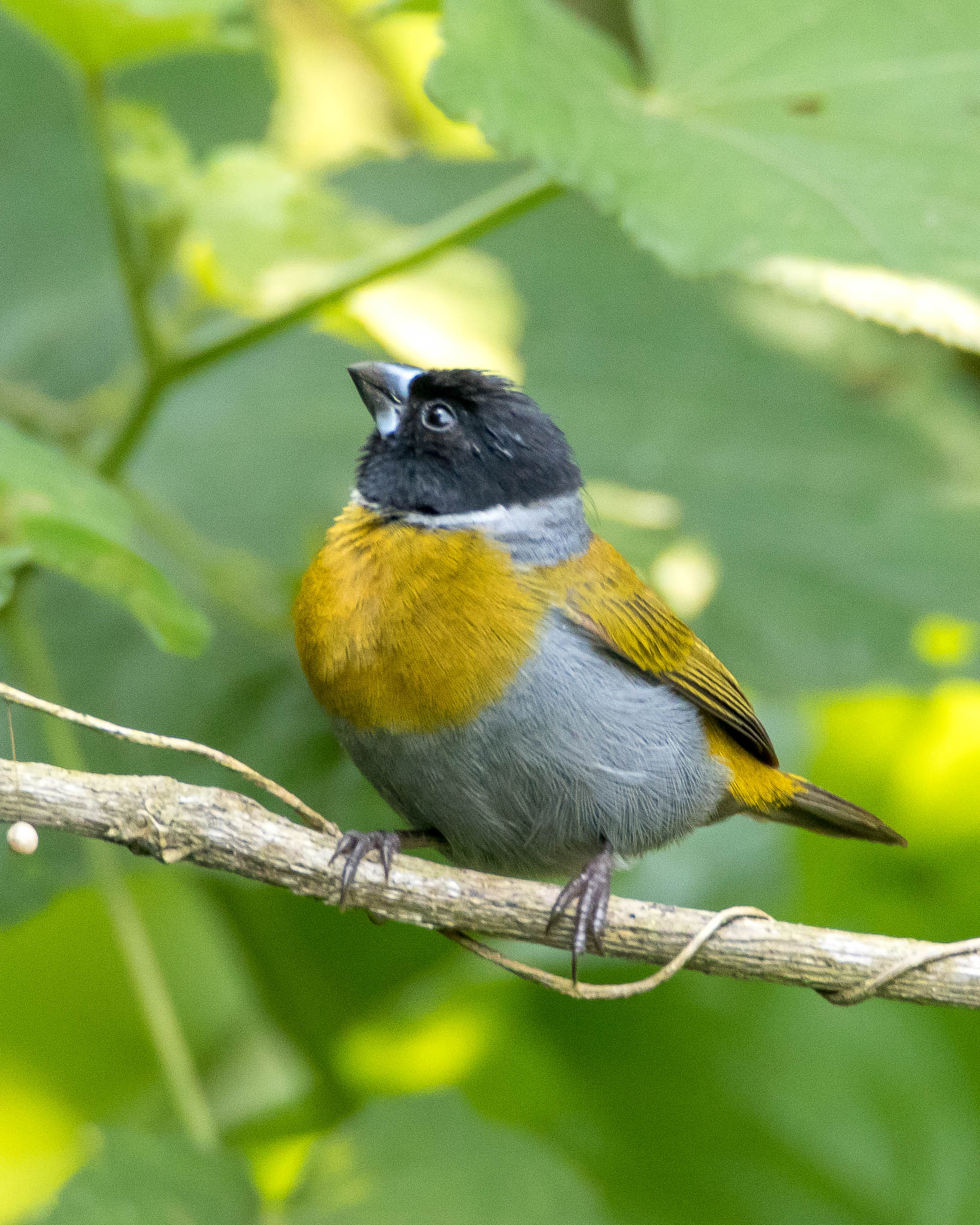

Conservation status
- Least Concern (IUCN 3.1)

Scientific classification
- Kingdom: Animalia
- Phylum: Chordata
- Class: Aves
- Order: Passeriformes
- Family: Estrildidae
- Genus: Nesocharis
- Species: N. ansorgei

Binomial name
- Nesocharis ansorgei (Hartert, 1899)

= White-collared oliveback =

Species of bird

The white-collared oliveback (Nesocharis ansorgei) is a species of estrildid finch found in Africa. It has an estimated global extent of occurrence of 94,000 km^{2}.

It could be found at Burundi, The Democratic Republic of the Congo, Rwanda, Tanzania & Uganda. However, it is not commonly seen in at least parts of its range. The IUCN has classified the species as being of least concern.
