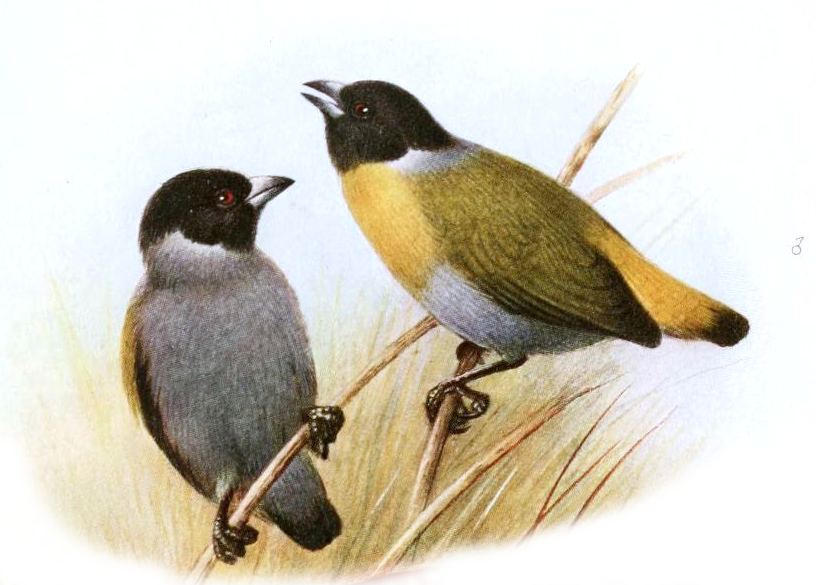

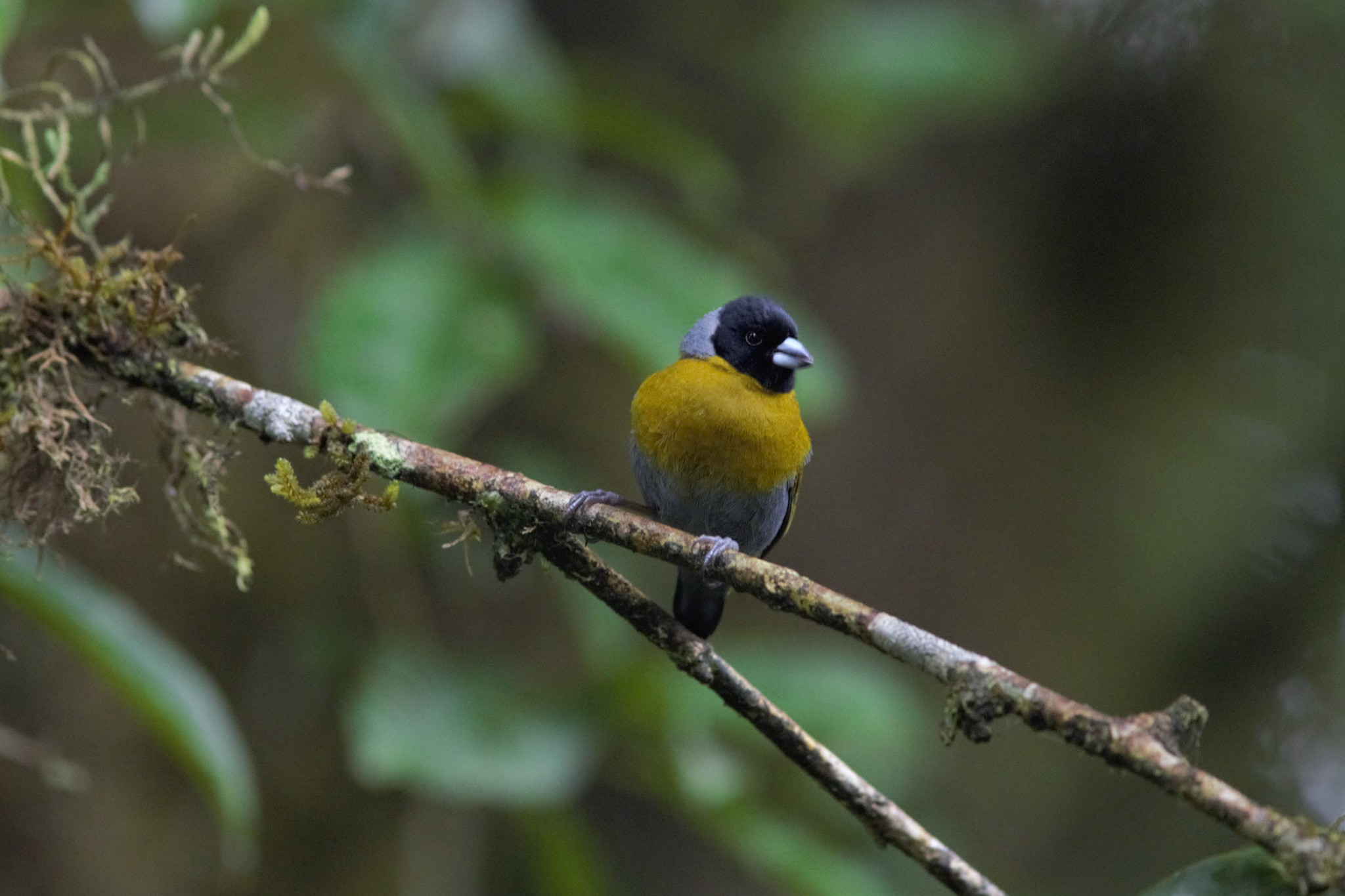

Conservation status
- Least Concern (IUCN 3.1)

Scientific classification
- Kingdom: Animalia
- Phylum: Chordata
- Class: Aves
- Order: Passeriformes
- Family: Estrildidae
- Genus: Nesocharis
- Species: N. shelleyi

Binomial name
- Nesocharis shelleyi Alexander, 1903

= Shelley's oliveback =

Species of bird

Shelley's oliveback (Nesocharis shelleyi), also known as the Fernando Po oliveback, is a species of estrildid finch found in Africa. It has an estimated global extent of occurrence of 55,000 km^{2}.

It is found in Bioko island, western Cameroon and adjacent Nigeria. The IUCN has classified the species as being of least concern.
