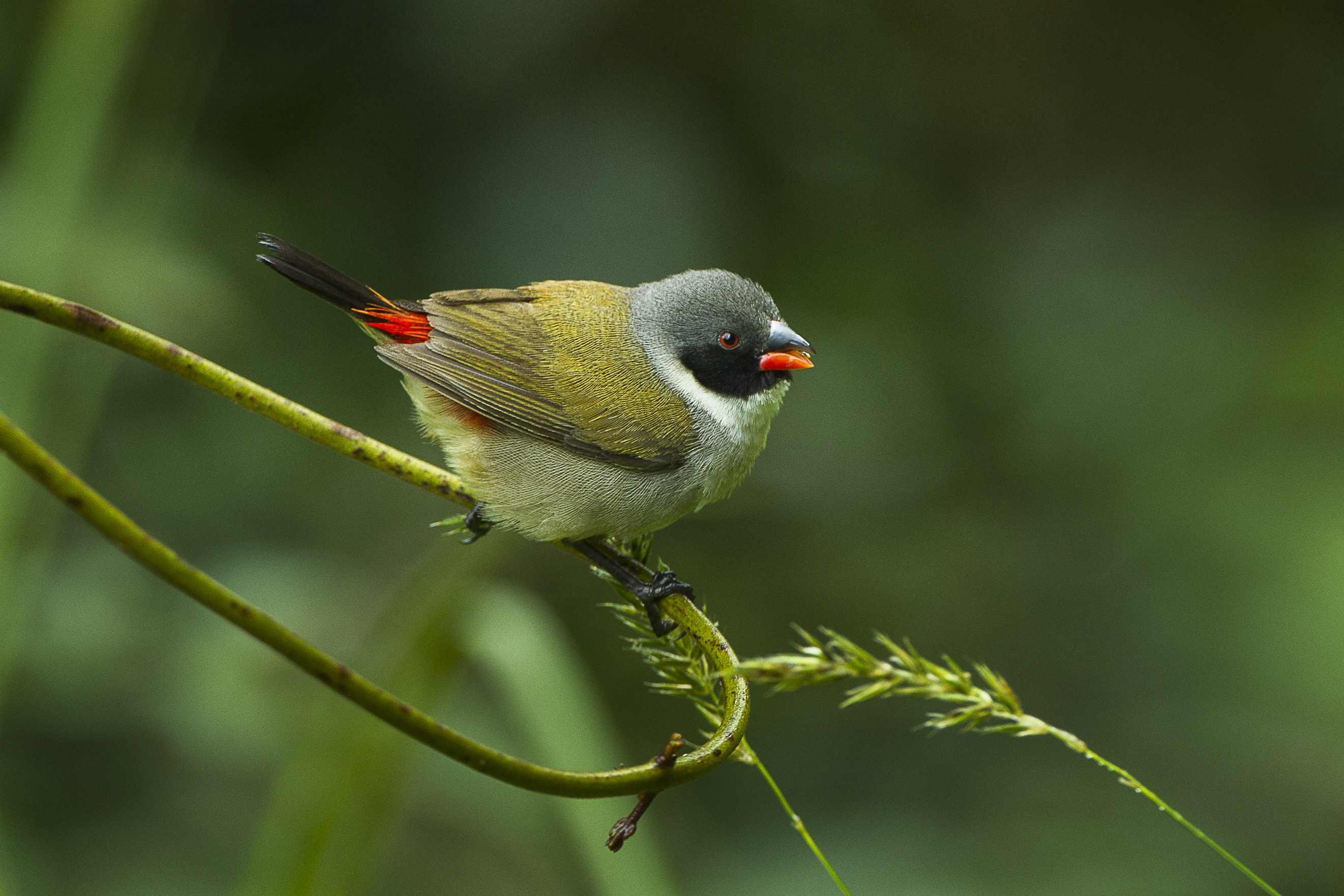

Conservation status
- Least Concern (IUCN 3.1)

Scientific classification
- Kingdom: Animalia
- Phylum: Chordata
- Class: Aves
- Order: Passeriformes
- Family: Estrildidae
- Genus: Coccopygia
- Species: C. melanotis

Binomial name
- Coccopygia melanotis (Temminck, 1823)

Synonyms
- Estrilda melanotis

= Swee waxbill =

Species of bird

The swee waxbill (Coccopygia melanotis), is a common species of estrildid finch native to Southern Africa.

== Description and subspecies ==
The swee waxbill is 9–10 cm long with a grey head and breast, pale yellow belly, olive back and wings, red lower back and rump, and a black tail. The upper mandible is black and the lower red. The male has a black face, but the female's face is grey. Juveniles are much duller than the female and have an all-black bill.

== Habitat and behaviour ==
The swee waxbill is typically found in uplands in dry shrubland and open forest habitats. Some subspecies also occur in lowlands, and may be seen in large gardens.

This species is a common and tame bird typically seen in small parties, and does not form large flocks. The swee waxbill's call is typically considered a soft swee, swee.
