= Donga-Mantung =

Donga-Mantung Mantungia
- Department
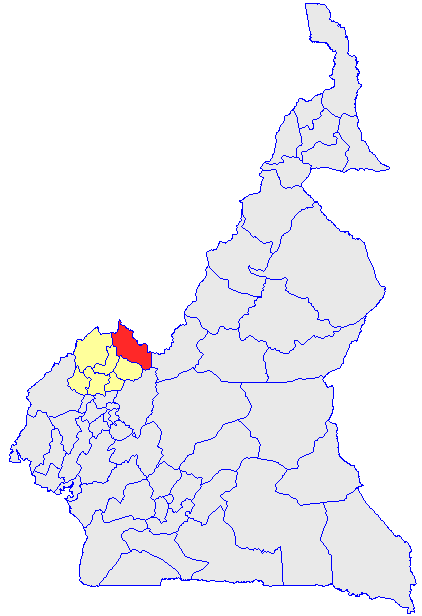
- Division location in Cameroon
- Country: Cameroon
- Region: Northwest Region
- Capital: Nkambe

Area
  - Total: 1,652 sq mi (4,279 km^{2})

Population (2021)
  - Total: 520 401
- Time zone: UTC+1 (WAT)

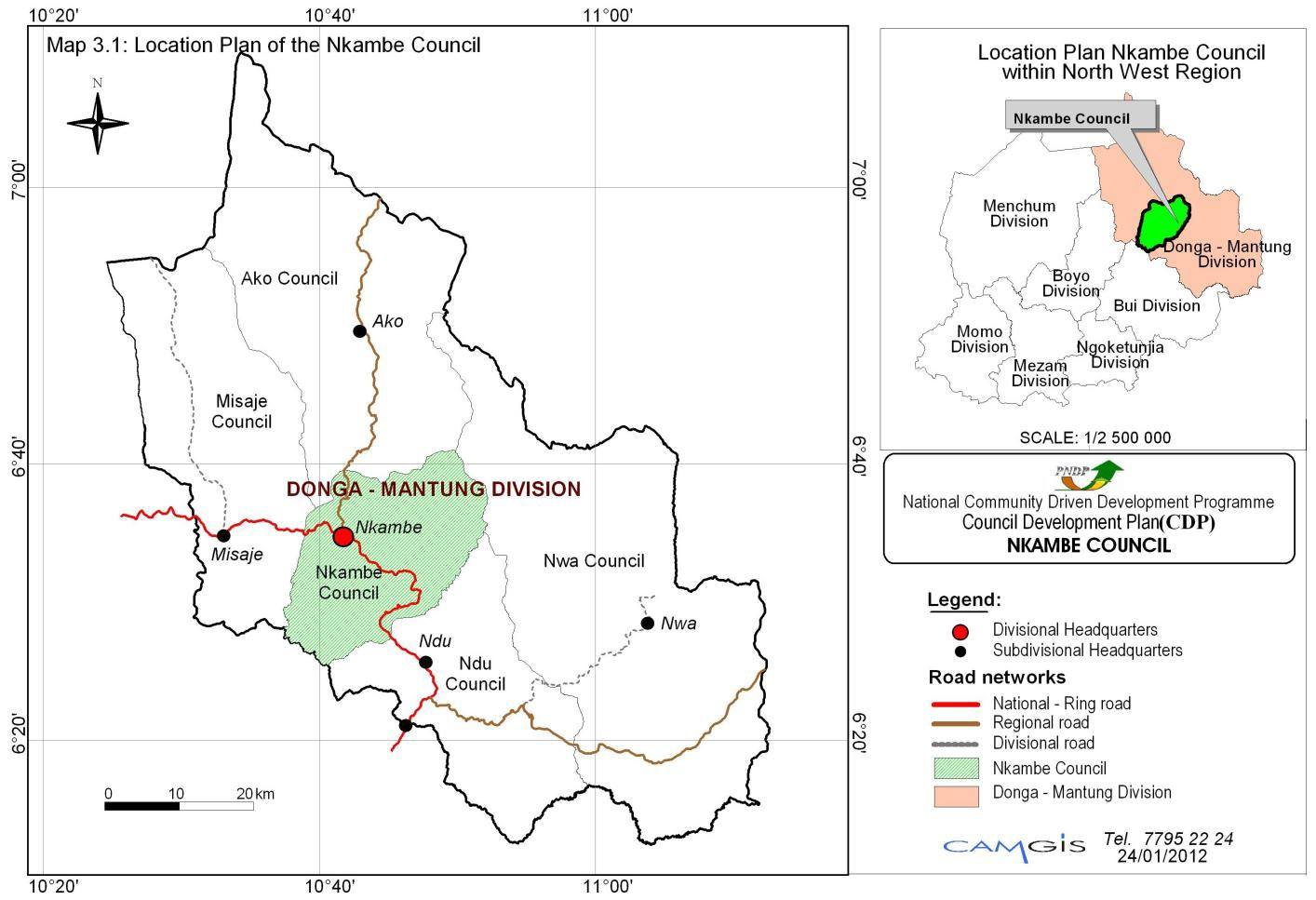
Mantungia Map

Mantungia is a division of the Northwest Region of Cameroon. The division covers an area of 4279 km^{2} and as of 2021 had a total population of 520 401. The capital city of the division is Nkambe.

== Etymology ==
Donga Mantung Division got its names from a German Explorer, Donga, who opened a German Station and Hospital in Mbem, Nwa in 1911. Mr Dunga also operated the first hydroelectricity plant on a river found beside the hospital simply called "Mantum" meaning "river " in the Mbem dialect, by the natives. So, this station and the German directives made the man and his project on the "Mantum" river made the Germans to simply considered him and his project a reference point for their exploration of the Cameroon high plateau. Eventually, the administration of Cameroon found these names representative of the historical, developmental and local distinctions that should be used in honour of the incredible work of this German. It is also to be noted that it was Donga who used forced labour to excavate the road to Mbem via the dangerous Rom Rock manually.

== History ==
Cameroon became a German Protectorate on July 14, 1884. By 1916, Germany was defeated during the First World War by the Allied Forces, and Cameroon was handed over to France and Britain under the League of Nations Mandate Agreement of 1922. Britain and France were mandated by the League of Nations to administer and prepare Cameroon for self-government at a later date. The Mandate Agreement resulted in the partition of Cameroon between the French and the British who had to enact policies that would ensure efficiency in the administration of their respective portions of the Mandate Territory of Cameroon. From 1916 to 1922, Britain had no formal administrative policy for the Cameroons and Nigeria. It was only in 1923 that the British "Orders-in-Council" created the then administrative Units known as Native Authorities (NA) headed by Traditional Rulers. The 1923 Orders-in-Council established British colonial Policy for the Cameroons and Nigeria. The Orders-in-Council equally enacted that British Law which were already applicable in Nigeria be extended to both Northern Cameroons and Southern Cameroons. By this policy, each village or Chieftaincy or Fondom constituted a Native Authority. The 1923 Orders-in-Council introduced a native administrative system known as "Indirect Rule", through which Britain administered its colonies in Africa through indigenous Chiefs and Traditional Institutions. This administrative system therefore excluded the educated Elites from administration. The administration was mounted by Traditional Rulers who were for the most part not literate or well educated, hence lacked both managerial capabilities and financial resources to carry out socio-economic development. This constituted a major flaw of the Native Authority system of administration. This flaw necessitated the Administrative Reforms of 1949 by the British. In 1949, Britain decided to create Local Government Units in the Cameroons and Nigeria. Different Chiefdoms or Fondoms were merged to constitute Divisional Local Government Units. Thus, the today North West Region was transformed into a province known as the Bamenda Province with three Divisions, namely, Bamenda Division, Wum Division and Nkambe Division. South West Region was equally divided into three Divisions, namely, Mamfe Division, Kumba Division and Victoria Division. These Divisions had deliberative and Legislative Powers and their representatives were elected through universal suffrage. They were empowered to ensure development in all its facets.

The Nkambe Division, today Donga-Mantung Division was created for the first time in 1949 by the British Colonial Ordinance. It was one of the three Divisional Local Government Units of the then Bamenda Province of Southern Cameroons. The Bamenda Province of Southern Cameroons was made of three Divisions, namely, Bamenda Division, Wum Division and Nkambe Division. Nkambe Division lasted from 1949 to 1968 when Donga and Mantung Division was created by a Presidential Decree. From 1963 to 1966, the Nkambe Division was divided into two subdivisions, namely, Nwa Subdivision, created by Presidential Decree No. 63/DF/25 of 26 July 1963, and Nkambe Subdivision, created by Presidential Decree No. 66/DF/432 of 26 August 1966.

On 30 December 1968, Presidential Decree No. 68/DF/509, Nkambe Division was transformed into Donga and Mantung Division. By the administrative re-organization of 1972, Presidential Decree No. 72-349 of 4 July 1972 once more changed the name of the Division from Donga and Mantung to simply Donga Mantung Division. The conjunction "and" was simply removed from the name. Donga Mantung Division derived its name from two rivers that flow across the Division, namely, River Donga in Ako Subdivision, and River Mantung in Nwa Subdivision. Ako Subdivision was the third subdivision to be created in Donga Mantung Division. It was created by a Presidential Decree in 1977. It covered Ako and Misaje areas. Ndu Subdivision was created by Presidential Decree in 1992 and its accompanying Municipal Council was created in 1993 via Decree No. 93/332 of 25 November 1993. Misaje Subdivision just like Ndu Subdivision was created and carved out of Ako Subdivision in 1992 by a Presidential Decree.

From 1992 to 1996, Donga Mantung Division witnessed yet another evolution. The Constitutional Reforms of 1996 in Cameroon transformed Provinces into Regions and did away with the previous administrative units called Districts, and replaced them with Subdivisions. Thus, from 1996, Districts ceased to exist as administrative units in Cameroon. The Subdivisions were each accompanied by Municipal Councils headed by Mayors elected via universal suffrage. The five subdivisions that make up Donga Mantung today are: Nkambe Central Subdivision, Nwa Subdivision, Ako Subdivision, Ndu Subdivision and Misaje Subdivision.

== Subdivisions ==
The department is divided administratively into 5 communes and in turn into villages.

=== Communes ===
- Ako
- Misaje
- Ndu
- Nkambé
- Nwa

== See also ==
- Communes of Cameroon
